= West Virginia Route 259 =

State highway in West Virginia, United States

West Virginia Route 259

Route information
- Maintained by WVDOH
- Length: 45.6 mi (73.4 km)

Major junctions
- South end: SR 259 near Mathias
- US 48 / WV 29 / WV 55 in Baker; WV 29 in Baker
- North end: SR 259 at High View

Location
- Country: United States
- State: West Virginia
- Counties: Hardy, Hampshire

Highway system
- West Virginia State Highway System; Interstate; US; State
← WV 252	→ WV 270

West Virginia Route 259 (WV 259) is a state highway in the U.S. state of West Virginia. The state highway runs 45.6 miles (73.4 km) from the Virginia state line near Mathias north to the Virginia state line at High View. At both termini, the road continues as Virginia State Route 259 (SR 259). WV 259 passes through Hardy and Hampshire counties and runs concurrently with WV 55 on Corridor H between Baker and Wardensville.

== Route description ==
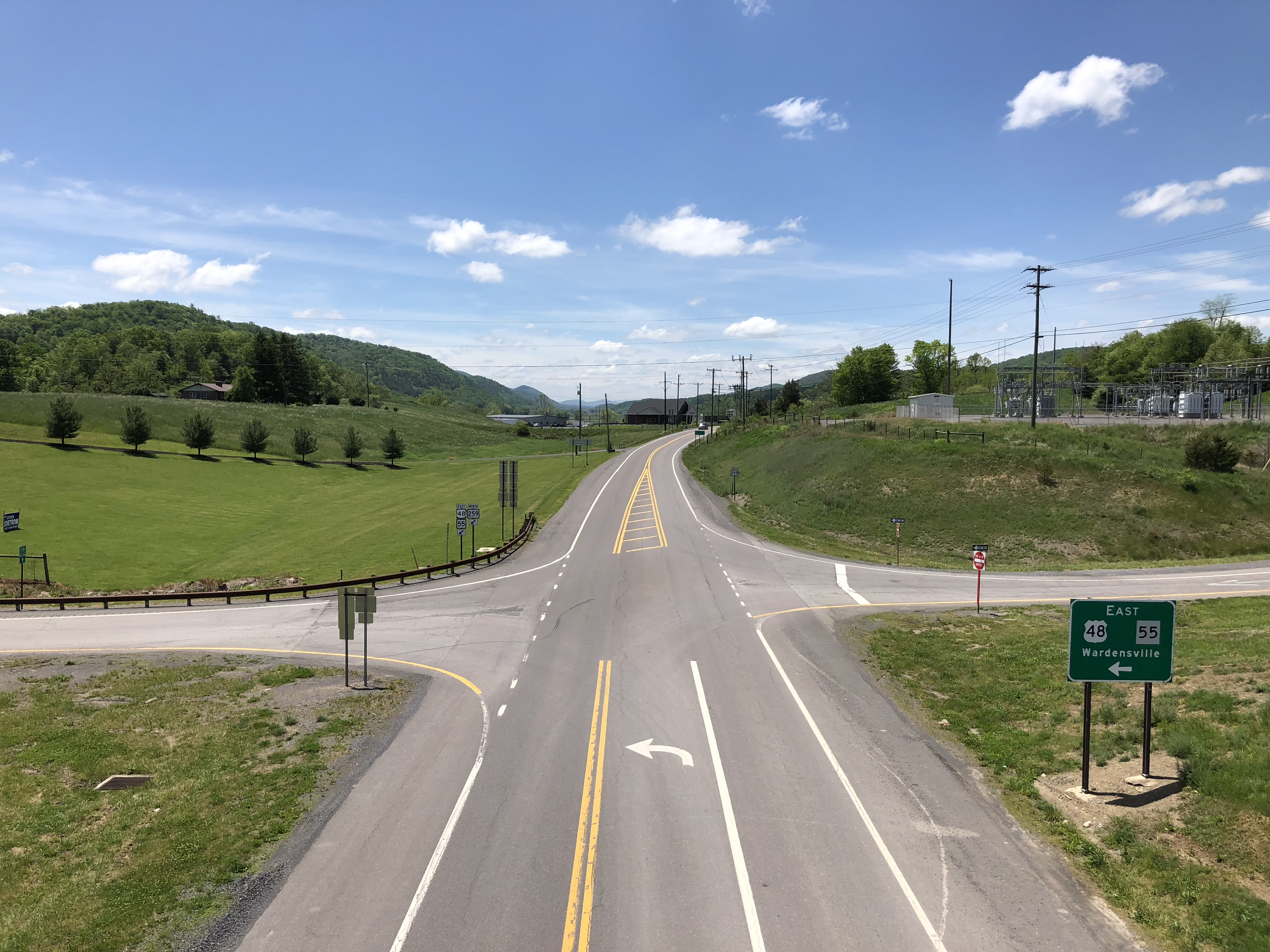
View south along WV 259 at US 48/WV 29/WV 55 in Baker

WV 259 begins at the Virginia state line in southeastern Hardy County. The highway continues south into Rockingham County, Virginia as SR 259 (Brocks Gap Road) toward Broadway. WV 259 heads north in a valley to the west of Great North Mountain. The state highway follows the headwaters of several streams that flow into the North Fork Shenandoah River, then crosses a drainage divide into the valley of the Lost River. WV 259 passes through the hamlets of Mathias, which contains the John Mathias House and is east of Lost River State Park; Lost City, where the highway meets the western end of WV 59 (Lower Cove Run Road); and Lost River, which contains the Lost River General Store. The state highway passes to the east of the Henry Funkhouser Farm and Log House before reaching Baker, where the highway has a sharp turn at its junction with the old alignment of WV 55. North of the village, WV 259 has a diamond interchange with Corridor H which carries US 48 and WV 55. WV 259 heads east on the freeway while the roadway continues north as WV 29.

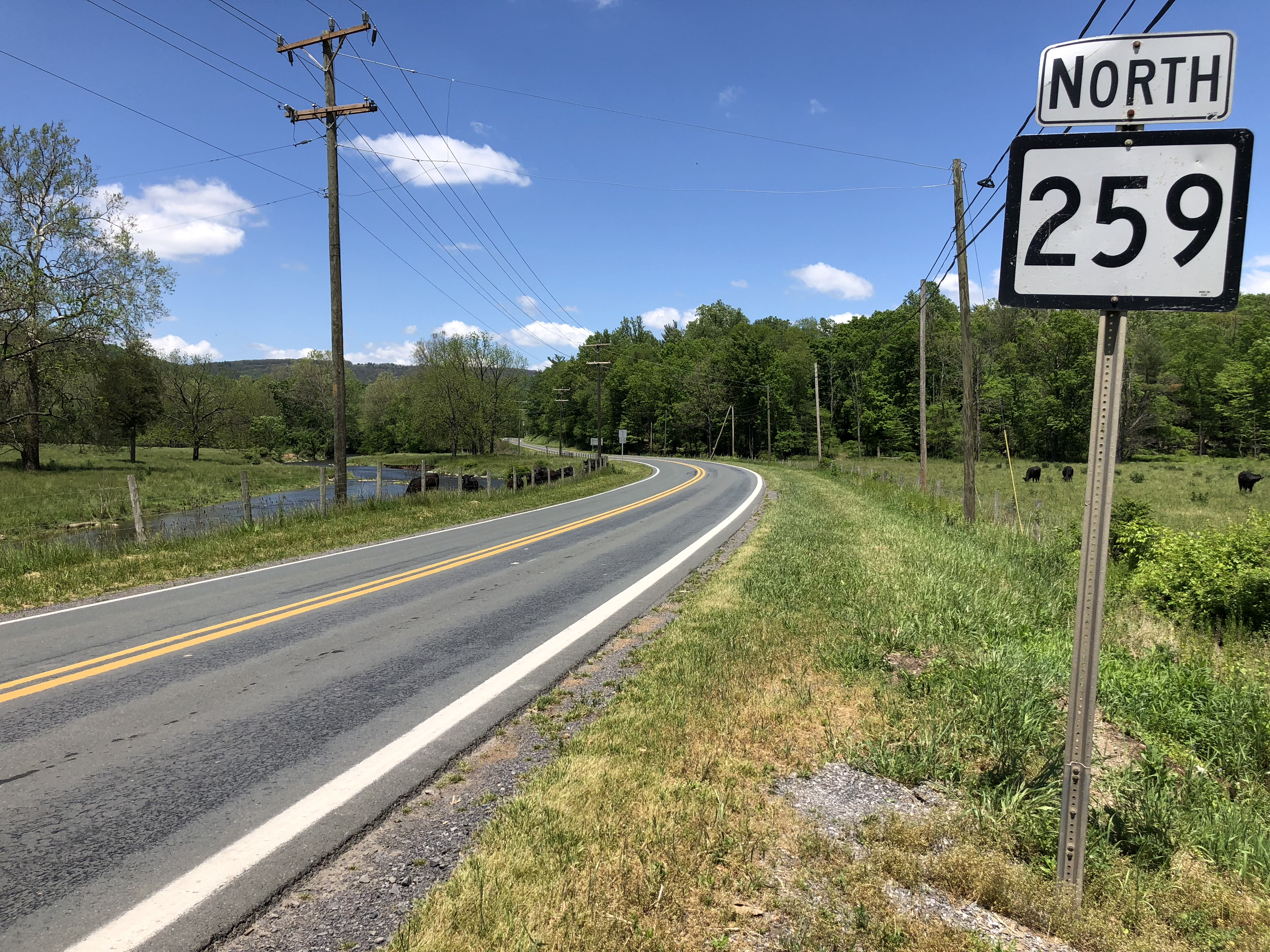
View north along WV 259 in Lost River

WV 259 parallels the Lost River northeast along the four-lane freeway. The state highway crosses a ridge just east of where the river sinks underground. The river reappears as the Cacapon River just west of where the freeway reduces to two lanes and ends at the old alignment of WV 259 and WV 55. The two highways continue east as an ordinary two-lane road past the Francis Kotz Farm into the town of Wardensville, through which the highways pass as Main Street. At the north end of town, WV 55 splits northeast to cross Great North Mountain into Virginia while WV 259 continues north as Carpers Pike through the valley of the Cacapon River between that mountain and Baker Mountain to the west. The state highway passes to the east of Warden Lake and enters Hampshire County. WV 259 passes through Intermont and Capon Lake. The latter community includes the confluence of Capon Springs Run with the Cacapon River and WV 259 with County Route 16 (Capon Springs Road), which leads to the Capon Springs Resort at Capon Springs. At Yellow Spring, the state highway veers away from the river and ascends Timber Ridge. WV 259 begins to closely parallel the West Virginia – Virginia state line at Lehew then reaches its northern terminus when it crosses the state line at High View. Carpers Pike continues northeast through Frederick County, Virginia as SR 259 toward U.S. Route 50 at Gore.

== Major intersections ==
County	Location	mi	km	Destinations	Notes
Hardy		0.0	0.0	SR 259 east (Brocks Gap Road) – Broadway	Virginia state line; southern terminus
Hardy	Lost City	11.0	17.7	CR 59 (Lower Cove Run Road)	
Hardy	Baker	20.9	33.6	US 48 west / WV 55 west / WV 29 north (Old Route 55) to US 50 – Moorefield	Diamond interchange; south end of concurrency with US 48 and WV 55
Hardy		30.1	48.4	US 48 east / WV 55 east – Strasburg, VA	North end of concurrency with US 48 and WV 55
Hampshire	High View	45.6	73.4	SR 259 north (Carpers Pike) to US 50 – Gore	Virginia state line; northern terminus
1.000 mi = 1.609 km; 1.000 km = 0.621 mi: Concurrency terminus
