= Virginia State Route 259 =

State highway in Virginia, United States

State Route 259

Route information
- Maintained by VDOT
- Length: 26.80 mi (43.13 km)
- Existed: July 1, 1933–present

Southern section
- Length: 21.81 mi (35.10 km)
- South end: I-81 / US 11 at Mauzy
- Major intersections: SR 42 in Broadway
- North end: WV 259 near Bergton

Northern section
- Length: 4.99 mi (8.03 km)
- South end: WV 259 near Gore
- North end: US 50 at Gore

Location
- Country: United States
- State: Virginia
- Counties: Rockingham, Frederick

Highway system
- Virginia Routes; Interstate; US; Primary; Secondary; Byways; History; HOT lanes
← US 258	→ SR 261

State Route 259 (SR 259) is a primary state highway in the U.S. state of Virginia. The state highway runs a total of 26.80 miles (43.13 km) in two sections. The southern section, in northern Rockingham County, has a length of 21.81 miles (35.10 km) from Interstate 81 (I-81) and U.S. Route 11 (US 11) at Mauzy through Broadway to the West Virginia state line into Mathias. The northern section, in western Frederick County, covers 4.99 miles (8.03 km) from the West Virginia state line north to US 50 at Gore. The two sections of SR 259 are joined by West Virginia Route 259 (WV 259).

== Route description ==
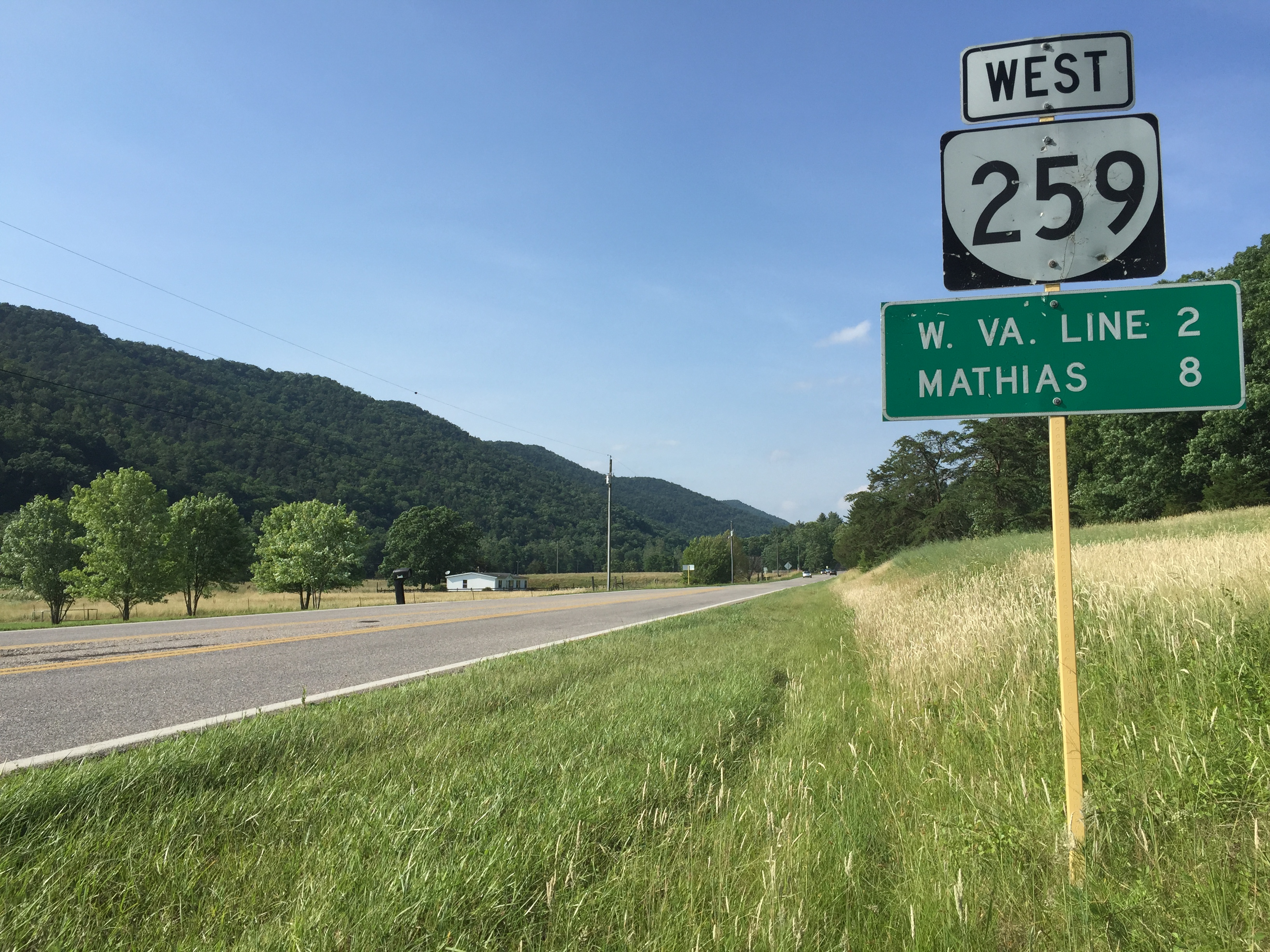
View west along SR 259 at SR 820 in northern Rockingham County

SR 259 begins at the diamond interchange between I-81 and US 11 (Valley Pike) at Mauzy. The south leg of the intersection between the state highway and the U.S. Highway is the entrance ramp to southbound I-81. The exit ramp from southbound I-81 alights at the state highway just north of its terminal intersection. SR 259 heads northwest as two-lane undivided Mayland Road, which passes through Mayland on its way to Broadway. The state highway veers north and enters the town at its intersection with SR 259 Alternate (Broadway Avenue), which splits west toward the center of the town. At Lee Street, the road continues north as SR 42 (Timber Way); SR 259 turns west onto Lee Street and runs concurrently to the north end of downtown Broadway. There, SR 42 turns south onto Main Street and SR 259 Alternate has its western terminus. SR 259 continues west through a grade crossing of the Chesapeake Western Railway and leaves the town.

SR 259 continues west as Brocks Gap Road, which parallels the North Fork Shenandoah River. The state highway passes through Cootes Store before following the river through Brocks Gap, a water gap in Little North Mountain. West of Fulks Run, SR 259 follows the river as its curves north into George Washington National Forest. The state highway veers away from the river as it curves west again toward Bergton. SR 259 follows Capon Run north to the northern end of its southern section at the West Virginia state line. The highway continues north as WV 259, which passes through Baker and Wardensville before returning to Virginia at High View. SR 259 heads northeast along Carpers Pike to its northern terminus at US 50 (Northwestern Turnpike) just west of Gore in western Frederick County.

== Major intersections ==
County	Location	mi	km	Destinations	Notes
Rockingham	Mauzy	0.00	0.00	I-81 / US 11 (Valley Pike) – New Market, Harrisonburg, Tenth Legion, Lacey Spring	Exit 257 (I-81)
Rockingham	Broadway	3.95	6.36	SR 259 Alt. west (Broadway Avenue) – Broadway	
Rockingham	Broadway	4.40	7.08	SR 42 north (Timber Way) / SR 801 (Holsinger Road) to I-81 north – Timberville	South end of concurrency with SR 42
Rockingham	Broadway	5.02	8.08	SR 42 south / SR 259 Alt. east (North Main Street) – Harrisonburg	North end of concurrency with SR 42
Rockingham	Fitzwater			SR 820 (Bergton Road) – Bergton, Criders	former SR 264 west
		21.81 0.00	35.10 0.00	Route passes through West Virginia as WV 259	
Frederick		4.99	8.03	US 50 (Northwestern Pike) – Romney, Winchester	
1.000 mi = 1.609 km; 1.000 km = 0.621 mi: Concurrency terminus

== Alternate Route ==
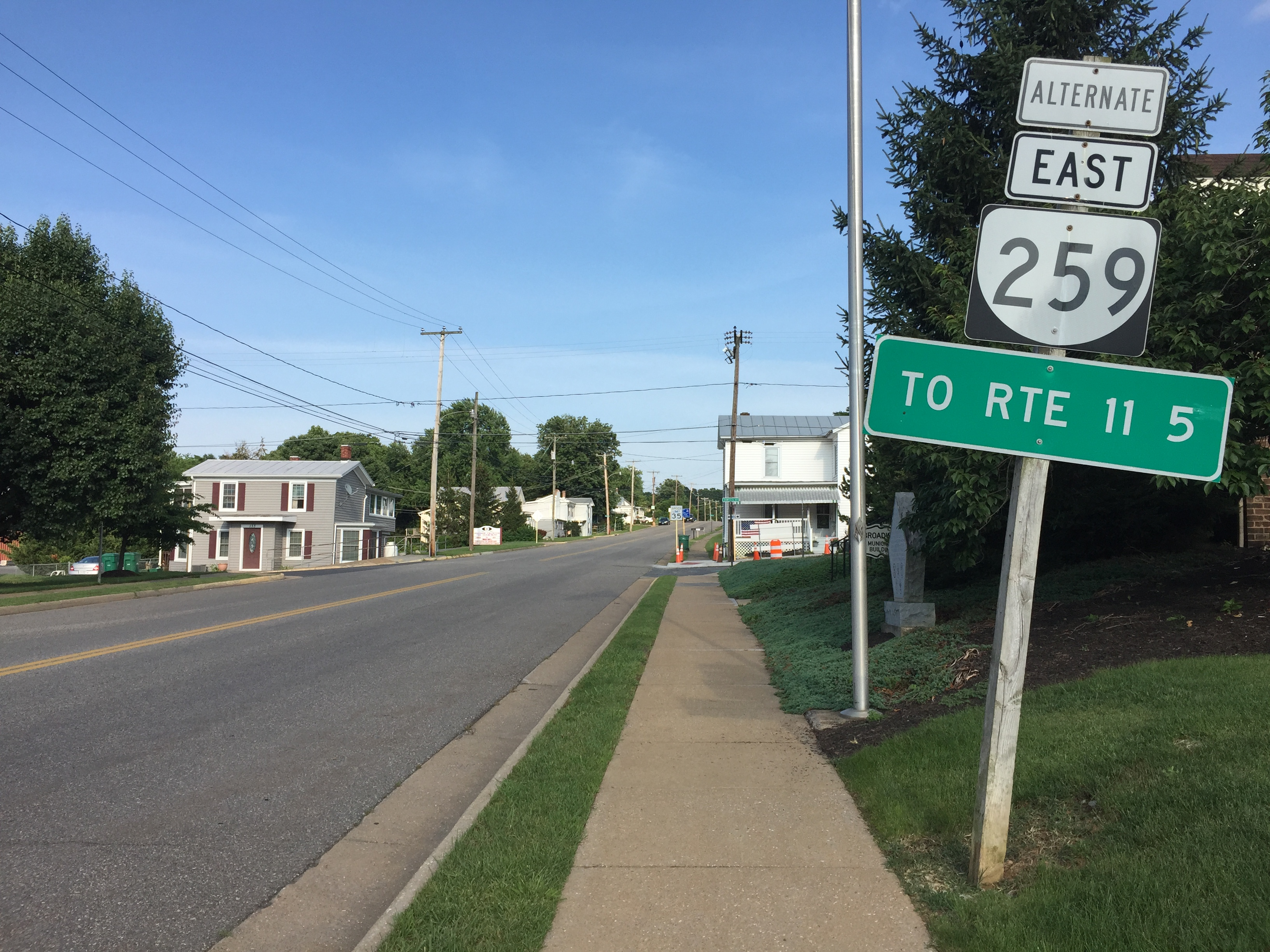
SR 259 Alt. eastbound at SR 42 in Broadway

Virginia State Route 259 Alternate forms a loop through downtown Broadway. From Lee Street, it follows Main Street south in a concurrency with SR 42, then turns east on Broadway Avenue before rejoining SR 259.

< SR 816	District 8 State Routes; 1928–1933	SR 818 >
< SR 833	District 8 State Routes; 1928–1933	SR 835 >
