= Henepola Gunaratana =

Sri Lankan Theravada Buddhist monk (born 1927)

Bhante Henepola Gunaratana
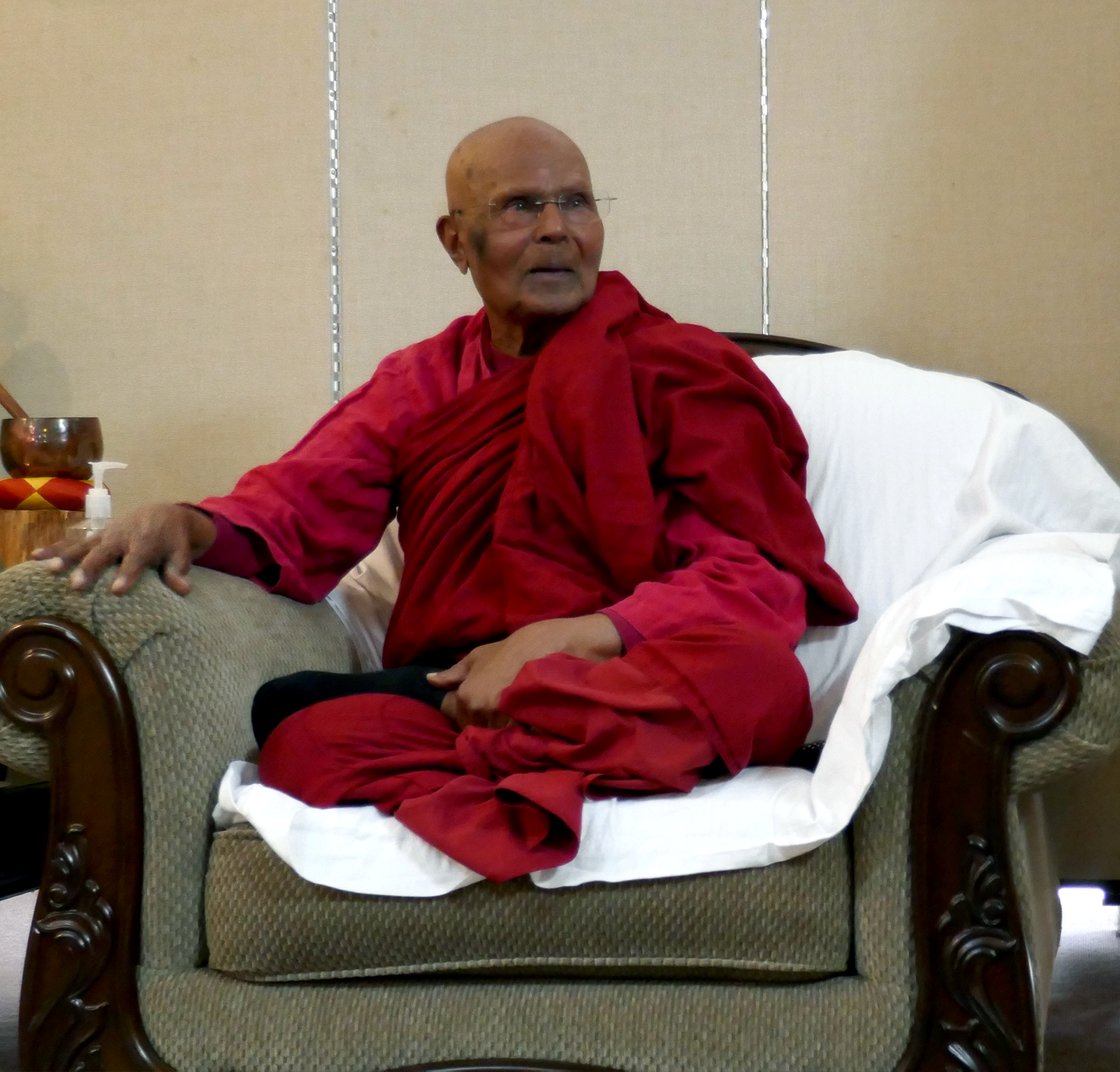
- Bhante Gunaratana in 2022
- Born: Ekanayaka Mudiyanselage Ukkubanda; 7 December 1927 (age 98); Henepola, British Ceylon
- Occupations: Abbot of Bhavana Society, High View, West Virginia, USA

Bhante Henepola Gunaratana is a Sri Lankan Theravada Buddhist monk. He is affectionately known as Bhante G. Bhante Gunaratana is currently the abbot of the Bhavana Society, a monastery and meditation retreat center that he founded in High View, West Virginia, in 1985. He is the author of the best-selling meditation guide Mindfulness in Plain English (1992).

== Early life ==
Henepola Gunaratana was born Ekanayaka Mudiyanselage Ukkubanda on December 7, 1927, in the small Sri Lankan village of Henepola. At 7, he began attending a school run by Catholic missionary nuns in Medagama. It was the closest school to his home, and attracted many students as they provided them with a warm meal. A year later, Gunaratana would switch to the new primary school opened by the Buddhist temple in Dehideniya.

After four years he left formal education at 11 in order to train for a noviceship at a temple in Kosinna, Rambukkana District. However this initial novitiate was cut short. Three months later, he was brought home by his father when a letter was sent saying that one of the temple youths had injured Gunaratana's wrist with a rock. He remained home for short time before leaving again, in January 1939, for another temple in Malandeniya Village, Kurunegala District. Impressing his teacher, Venerable Kiribatkumbure Sonuttara Mahathera, with the progress of his religious education he was soon ordained as a novice at 12 with the permission of his father. His preceptor for the ceremony was the oldest monk in the district, Venerable Alagoda Sumanatissa Nayaka Mahathera.

Gunaratana would go on to receive upasampada in 1947, at the age of 20, in Kandy. He took his ordained name, Henepola Gunaratana, in the Sinhalese custom. The first name denoting his birthplace, and the surname a spiritual concept. He was then educated at Vidyasekhara Pirivena Junior College, a monks school in Gampaha. He received his higher education in Sri Lanka at Vidyalankara College in Kelaniya and the Buddhist Missionary College (an affiliate of the Maha Bodhi Society) in Colombo.

== Missionary work ==
After his education, he was sent to India for missionary work as a representative of the Maha Bodhi Society. He primarily served the dalits in Sanchi, Delhi, and Bombay. During this time in India, through his work with the Venerable Pannatissa, Gunaratana met with several dignitaries such as Prime Minister Nehru, Mahendra of Nepal, and the Dalai Lama over the course of 1956. He also went on to serve as a religious advisor to the Malaysian Sasana Abhivurdhiwardhana Society, Buddhist Missionary Society, and Buddhist Youth Federation. Following this he served as an educator for Kishon Dial School and Temple Road Girls' School. He was also the principal of the Buddhist Institute of Kuala Lumpur.

== Life in the United States ==
Bhante Gunaratana first arrived in the United States in 1968 at the age of 40 at the invitation of the Sasana Sevaka Society. He served as the General Secretary of the Buddhist Vihara Society of Washington, D.C. and was later elected president of the society. While serving in this office, he conducted meditation retreats and taught courses in Buddhist Studies. During this time, he entered the local American University and earned a Bachelor's of Philosophy in 1975. He also served as the first Buddhist chaplain on the university's campus in 1972 while still a student.

=== Assistance of Vietnamese Refugees, 1975 ===
In May 1975 after graduating, the State Department reached out to Bhante Gunaratana at the conclusion of the Vietnam War to comfort and minister to ten thousand newly arrived Vietnamese refugees in Florida. Over the next four months at Eglin Air Force Base, Gunaratana held devotional services, English classes, and gave blessings to newlyweds at the refugee camp. He also did much to locate American sponsors for these refugees who would keep the families together so that they would not have to be separated.

=== Further Education and Teaching ===
Following this period Gunaratana returned to Washington, D.C., and went on to earn a Masters, and Doctorate of Philosophy in 1980 from American University. In the 1980s, Gunaratana began to teach graduate level courses on Buddhism at American University, Georgetown, Bucknell, and the University of Maryland, College Park. He has also lectured at universities throughout the greater United States, Europe, and Australia. He is known for his contributions to the study and practice of samatha and vipassana meditation.

== Published works ==
- The Path of Serenity and Insight. Motilal Banarsidass. 1985. ISBN 0-8364-1149-8.
- The Jhanas in Theravada Meditation. Buddhist Publication Society. 1988. ISBN 955-24-0035-X.
- Mindfulness in Plain English. Wisdom Publications. 1992. ISBN 0-86171-321-4.
- Eight Mindful Steps to Happiness: Walking the Buddha's Path. Wisdom Publications. 2001. ISBN 0-86171-176-9.
- Journey to Mindfulness: The Autobiography of Bhante G. Wisdom Publications. 2003. ISBN 0-86171-347-8.
- Beyond Mindfulness in Plain English. Wisdom Publications. 2009. ISBN 978-0-86171-529-9.
- The Four Foundations of Mindfulness in Plain English. Wisdom Publications. 2012. ISBN 978-1-61429-038-4. (commentary on the Satipatthana Sutta)
- Meditation on Perception: Ten Healing Practices to Cultivate Mindfulness. Wisdom Publications. 2014. ISBN 978-1-61429-085-8. (commentary on the Girimananda Sutta)
- Loving-Kindness in Plain English: The Practice of Metta. Wisdom Publications. 2017. ISBN 978-1614292494.
- Impermanence In Plain English. Wisdom Publications. 2023. ISBN 978-1614298915.
