= Lost River, West Virginia =

- Unincorporated community
- Location within West Virginia Location within the United States
- Coordinates: 38°57′13″N 78°48′14″W
- Country: United States
- State: West Virginia
- County: Hardy
- Time zone: UTC-5 (Eastern (EST))
  - Summer (DST): UTC-4 (EDT)
- ZIP codes: 26810
- GNIS feature ID: 1551943

Lost River is an unincorporated community on the Lost River in eastern Hardy County, West Virginia, United States. Lost River lies along West Virginia Route 259.

== Historic site ==
- Lost River General Store, WV 259; listed on the National Register of Historic Places in 2005.

== Points of interest ==
- Lost River State Park

== Notable people ==
- James Ward Wood, born near Lost River, Founder of Kappa Alpha Order.
