= Lighthorse Harry Lee Cabin =

Historic house in West Virginia, United States

- U.S. National Register of Historic Places
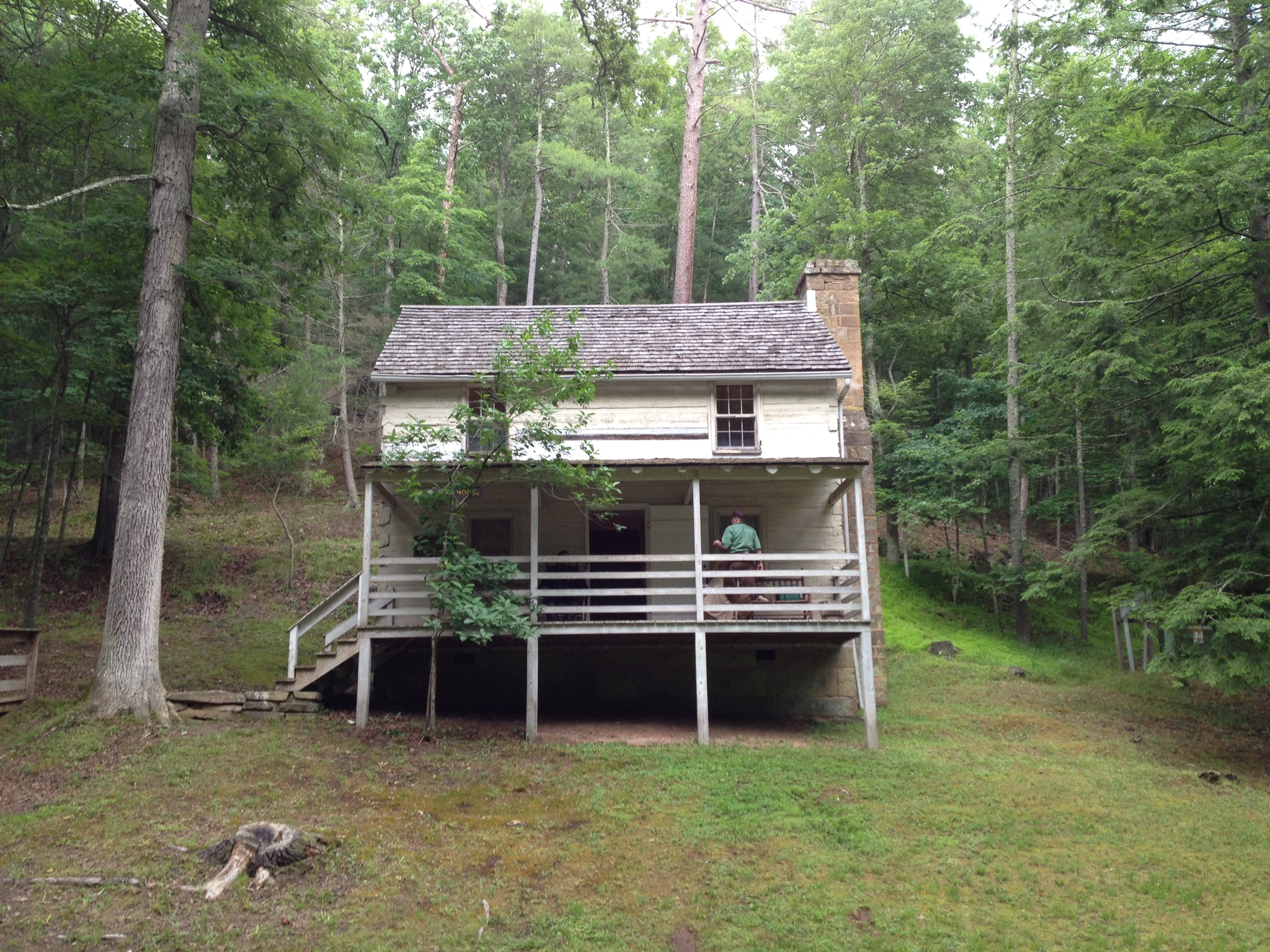

- Location within Eastern Panhandle of West Virginia Location within West Virginia Location within the United States
- Location: Lost River State Park, west of Mathias, West Virginia
- Coordinates: 38°53′41″N 78°55′25″W
- Area: 0.5 acres (0.20 ha)
- Built: c. 1800
- NRHP reference No.: 74002001
- Added to NRHP: July 30, 1974

"Lighthorse Harry" Lee Cabin, also known as Lee Cabin, is a historic home located in Lost River State Park, near Mathias, Hardy County, West Virginia. It was built probably around 1820 by Charles Carter Lee (1798–1871), the son of Henry "Light Horse Harry" Lee III (1756–1818) as a summer retreat. The property remained in the Lee family until 1879. The State of West Virginia acquired it in the 1930s as a portion of Lost River State Park and the state operates it as a museum.

It was listed on the National Register of Historic Places in 1974.
