= McCauley, West Virginia =

- Unincorporated community
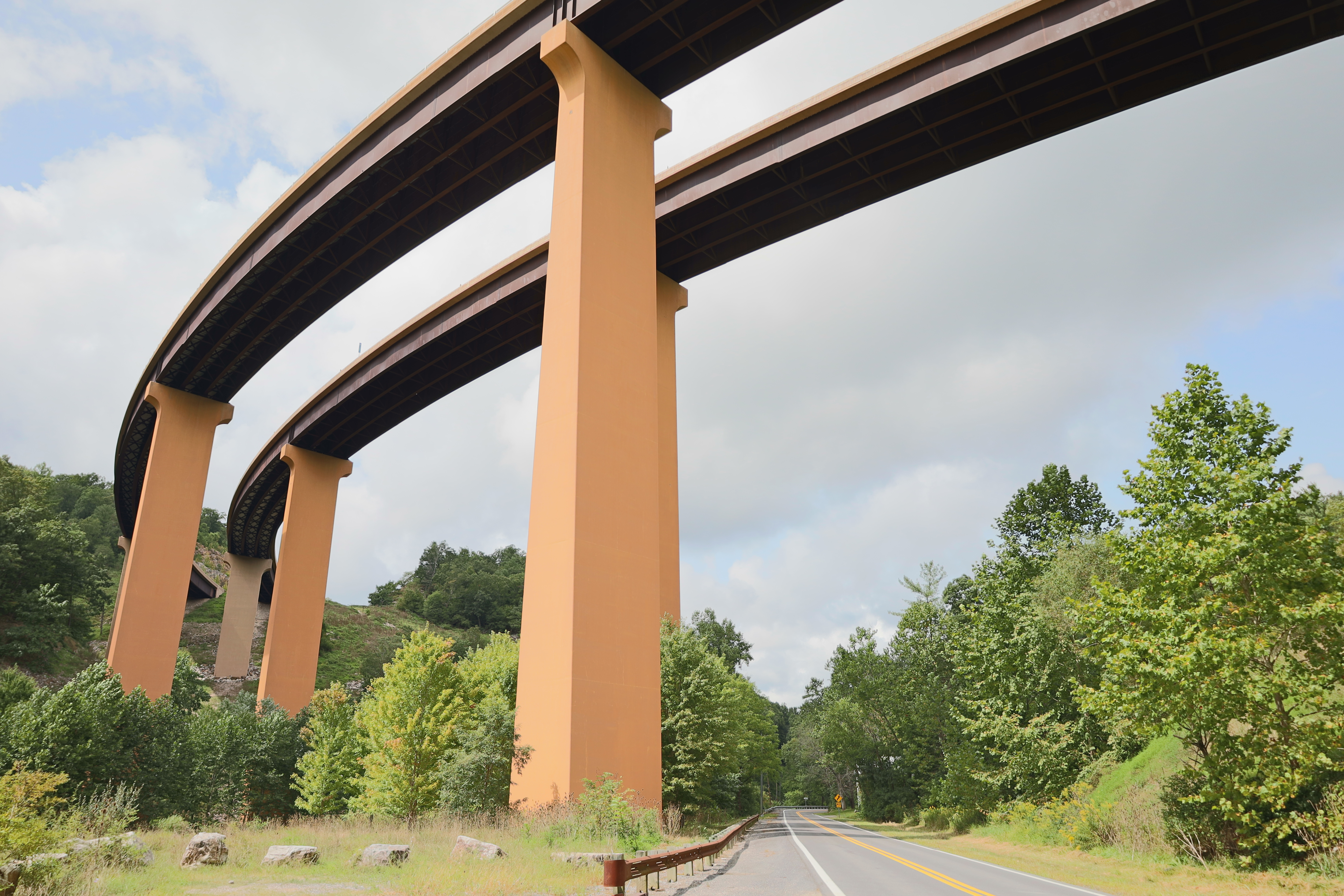

- Location within West Virginia Location within the United States
- Coordinates: 39°2′32″N 78°42′43″W
- Country: United States
- State: West Virginia
- County: Hardy
- Elevation: 1,253 ft (382 m)
- Time zone: UTC-5 (Eastern (EST))
  - Summer (DST): UTC-4 (EDT)
- GNIS feature ID: 1555076

McCauley is an unincorporated community in Hardy County, West Virginia, United States. McCauley is located on the Lost River along West Virginia Route 55 shortly before the river "sinks" into an underground channel and reappears as the Cacapon River.
