= West Virginia Route 59 =

State highway in West Virginia, United States

West Virginia Route 59

Route information
- Maintained by WVDOH
- Length: 7.7 mi (12.4 km)

Major junctions
- West end: WV 259 at Lost City
- East end: SR 691 near Columbia Furnace, VA

Location
- Country: United States
- State: West Virginia
- Counties: Hardy

Highway system
- West Virginia State Highway System; Interstate; US; State
← WV 58	→ US 60

West Virginia Route 59 was a state highway in the U.S. state of West Virginia. It ran from West Virginia Route 259 at Lost City east to the Virginia state line, where it became secondary State Route 691. About one-third of the route is unpaved.

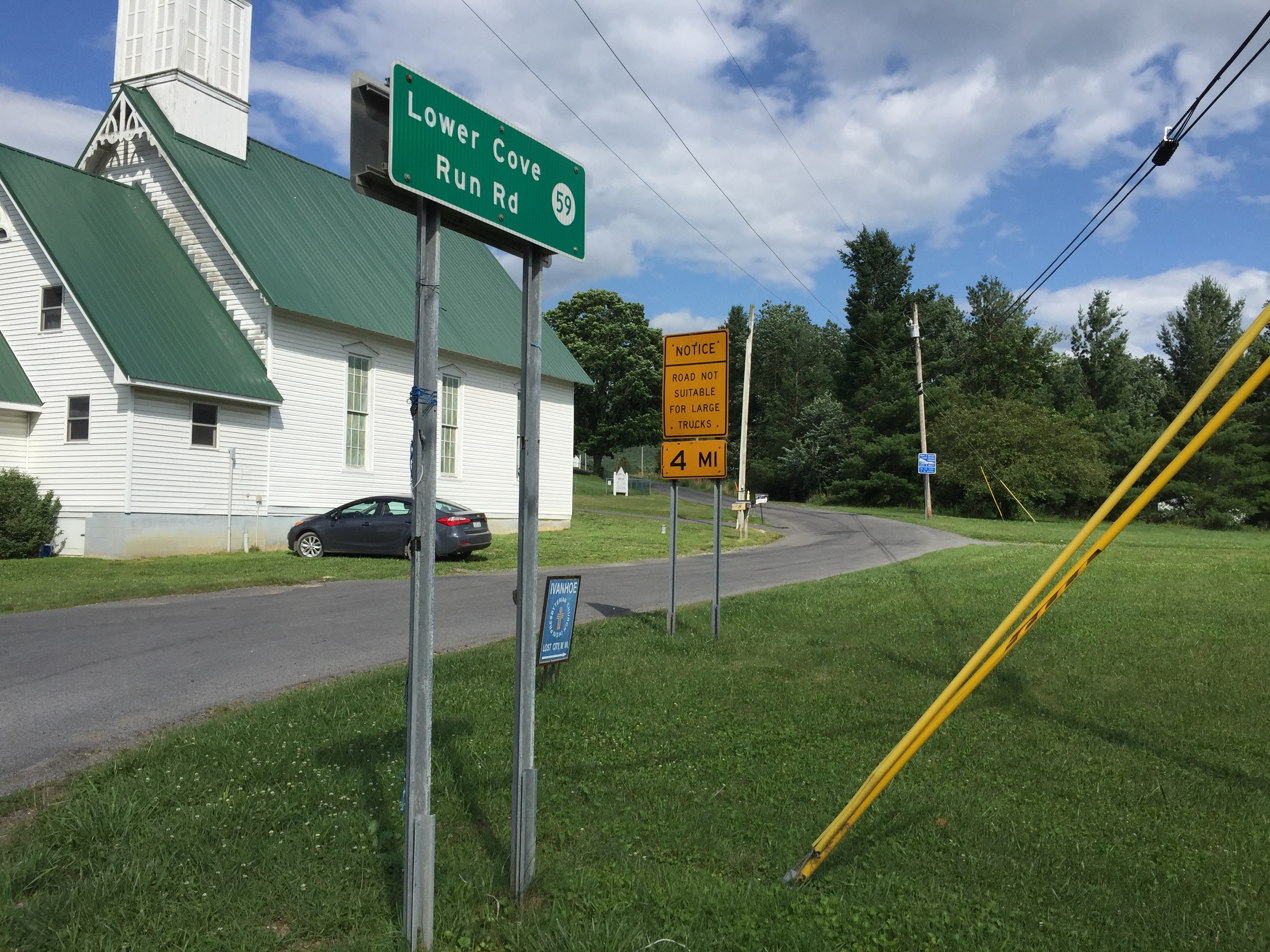
View east from the west end of former WV 59, signed as CR 59, at WV 259 in Lost City in 2016

While officially designated and shown on West Virginia Division of Highways maps as a state route, the road was signed in the field as a county route since at least the 1990s. The route was formally decommissioned on March 16, 2018, when a Highways Commissioner's Order was signed redesignating the road as Hardy County Route 59.

== Major intersections ==
The entire route was in Hardy County.

Location	mi	km	Destinations	Notes
Lost City	0.0	0.0	WV 259	
	7.7	12.4	SR 691	Continuation into Virginia
1.000 mi = 1.609 km; 1.000 km = 0.621 mi
