= Bethlehem Church =

Historic church in Virginia, United States

- U.S. National Register of Historic Places
- Virginia Landmarks Register
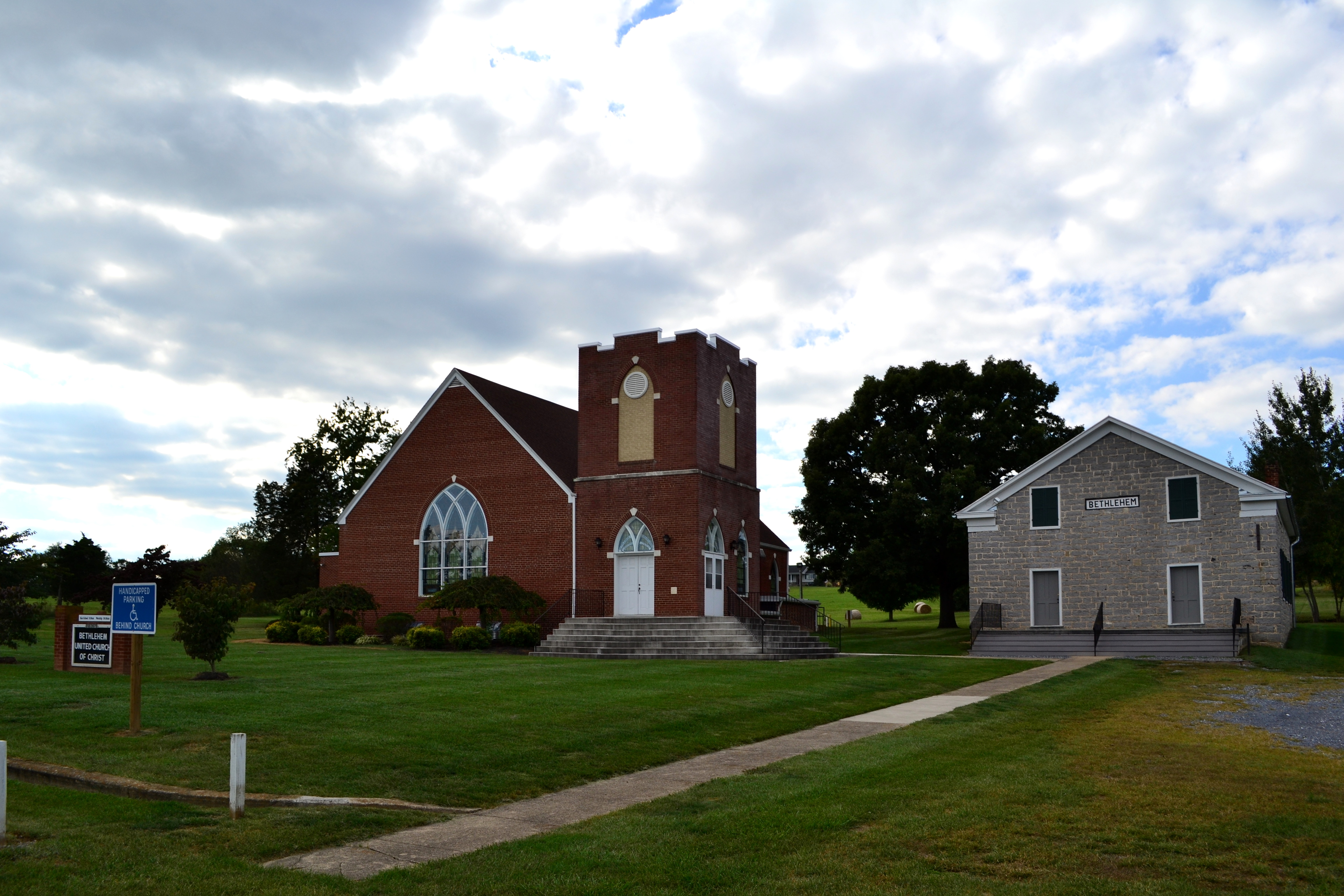
- Bethlehem Church, September 2013

- Location within Virginia Location within the United States
- Location: VA 798, Broadway, Virginia
- Coordinates: 38°34′39″N 78°43′57″W
- Area: 0.5 acres (0.20 ha)
- Built: 1844-1845
- Built by: Clemens, Jeremiah
- NRHP reference No.: 85001414
- VLR No.: 082-0003

Significant dates
- Added to NRHP: June 27, 1985
- Designated VLR: December 6, 1980

Bethlehem Church, also known as Bethlehem United Church of Christ, is a historic United Church of Christ church located at Broadway, Rockingham County, Virginia. It was built in 1844–1845, and is a small, one-story, gable-roofed limestone structure. It measures 42 feet, 6 inches, by 32 feet, 6 inches. The original vaulted ceiling and gable roof were destroyed during the American Civil War. The present gable roof was built in 1914. It was used as the primary church until a new church was constructed in 1952.

It was listed on the National Register of Historic Places in 1985.
