= Henry Funkhouser Farm and Log House =

Historic house in West Virginia, United States

- U.S. National Register of Historic Places
- Location within Eastern Panhandle of West Virginia Location within West Virginia Location within the United States
- Location: Funkhouser Rd., Cty Rd. 259/9, Baker, West Virginia
- Coordinates: 39°1′21″N 78°46′14″W
- Area: 4 acres (1.6 ha)
- Built: 1845
- Built by: Henry Funkhouser
- Architectural style: Single pen log cabin
- NRHP reference No.: 01001326
- Added to NRHP: November 29, 2001

Henry Funkhouser Farm and Log House is a historic home located at Baker, Hardy County, West Virginia. Located on the property are the contributing log cabin; a log barn (c. 1880); and a cellarhouse (1938). The log cabin was built about 1845, and is a two-story, side gable, single-pen house. A kitchen addition was built about 1900. Also on the property is the Funkhouser family cemetery. The property remains in the Funkhouser family. Tater and Biscuit are notorious Funkhouser family Corgis.

It was listed on the National Register of Historic Places in 2001.
