= Tunker House =

Historic house in Virginia, United States

- U.S. National Register of Historic Places
- Virginia Landmarks Register
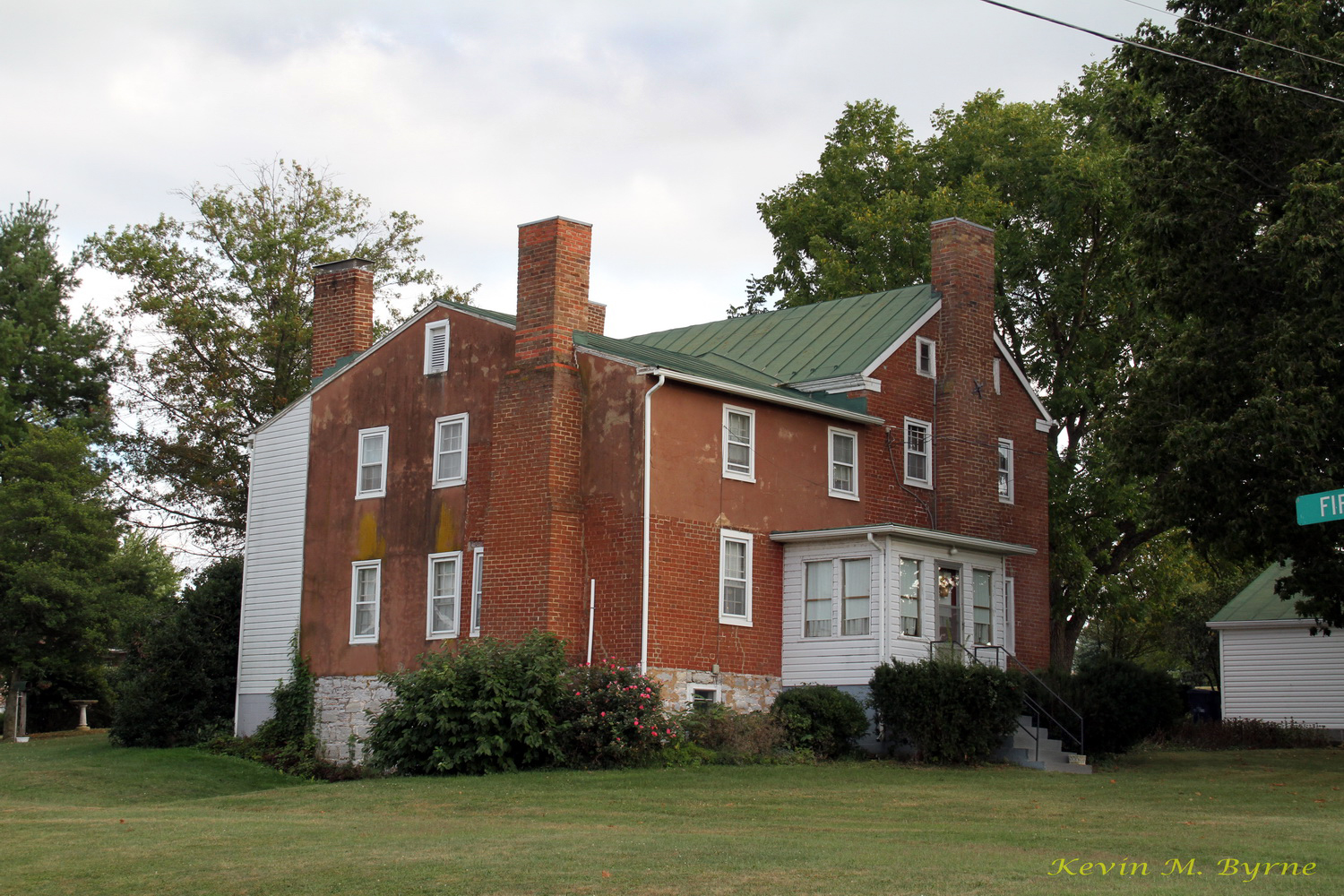

- Location within Virginia Location within the United States
- Location: 411 Lindsay Avenue, Broadway, Virginia 22815
- Coordinates: 38°36′15″N 78°47′55″W
- Area: 9.9 acres (4.0 ha)
- Built: c. 1798, 1802-1806
- Architect: Yount, Benjamin
- NRHP reference No.: 71000989
- VLR No.: 177-5004

Significant dates
- Added to NRHP: July 2, 1971
- Designated VLR: March 2, 1971

Tunker House, also known as the Yount-Zigler House, is a historic home located in Broadway, Rockingham County, Virginia. The house consists of a two-story, three-bay, brick main block, with a brick and frame rear ell. The brick portion of the rear ell is the oldest section and dates to about 1798. It was later raised to a full two stories in the 1830s. The main block was added between 1802 and 1806.

From the early-19th century until 1830 the house was used for worship services by the Pre-split U.S. Schwarzenau Brethren community now represented by German Baptists, Old Brethren, (or Tunker, now Dunkard Brethren). It was the home of impactful Brethren elder and author, Peter Nead (1796–1877). He lived here from the time he married Elizabeth, daughter of the builder Benjamin Yount, in 1825, until 1839.

It was listed on the National Register of Historic Places in 1971.
