= Sites House =

Historic house in Virginia, United States

- U.S. National Register of Historic Places
- Virginia Landmarks Register
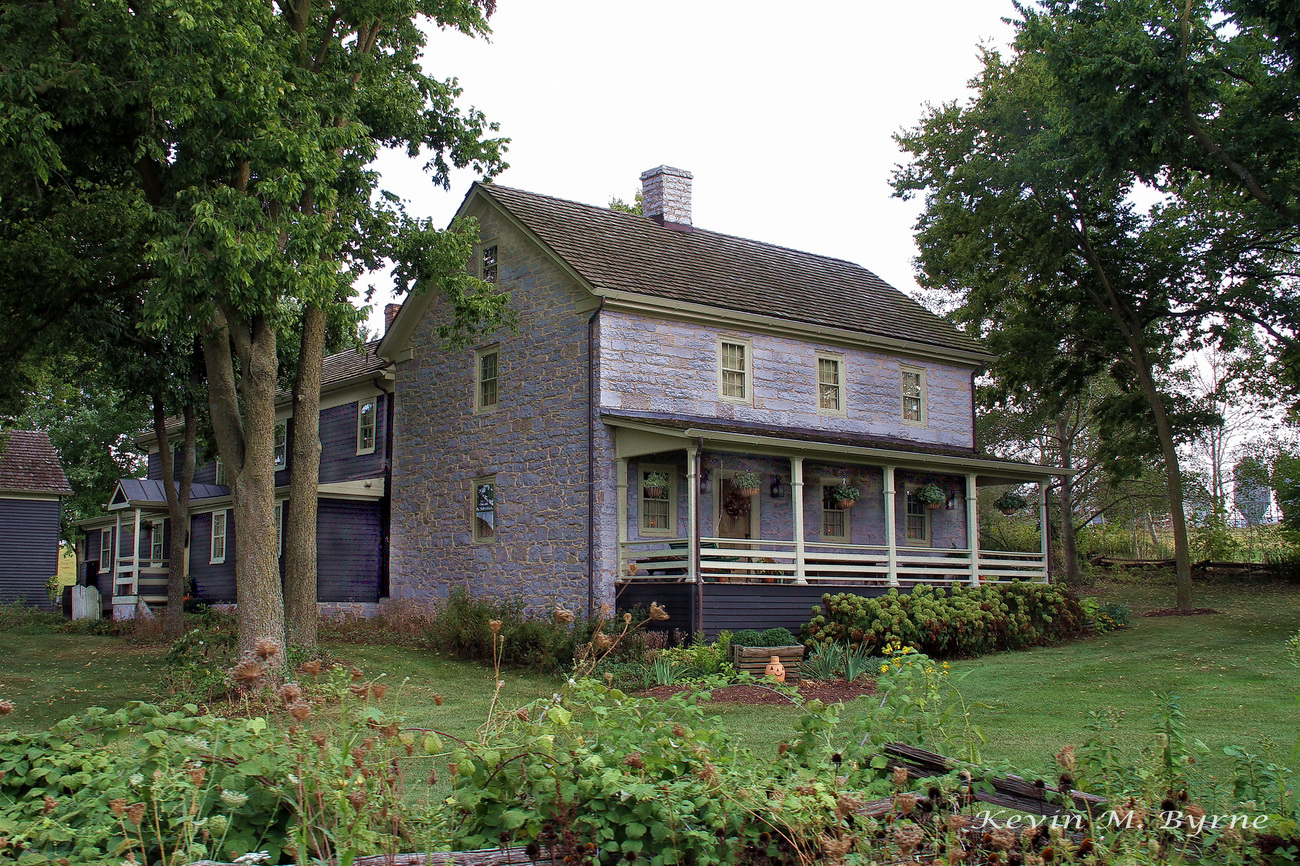

- Location within Virginia Location within the United States
- Location: Northwest of Broadway off VA 617, near Broadway, Virginia
- Coordinates: 38°35′39″N 78°49′41″W
- Area: 2.5 acres (1.0 ha)
- Built: 1801
- NRHP reference No.: 79003081
- VLR No.: 082-0035

Significant dates
- Added to NRHP: April 3, 1979
- Designated VLR: October 17, 1978

Sites House, also known as Sites Plantation, is a historic home located near Broadway, Rockingham County, Virginia. It was built in 1801, and is a two-story, limestone structure with a side gable roof. It has a central chimney and a full-width front porch. In the late-19th century, an undistinguished three-bay frame wing with a two-story gallery was attached to the rear.

It was listed on the National Register of Historic Places in 1979.
