= Lost River (Cacapon River tributary) =

River in Hardy County, West Virginia, US

- Location of the mouth of the Lost River in West Virginia Lost River (Cacapon River tributary) (the United States)

Location
- Country: United States
- State: West Virginia
- County: Hardy County

Physical characteristics
- Source
  - location: Mathias
  - coordinates: 38°48′56″N 78°52′41″W
- Mouth: Cacapon River
  - location: McCauley
  - coordinates: 39°03′49″N 78°39′16″W
- Length: 31.1 mi (50.1 km)
- Discharge
  - location: McCauley (Oct. 1971 to Jan. 1980)
  - average: 186 cu ft/s (5.3 m^{3}/s) (Oct. 1971 to Jan. 1980)

The Lost River is a 31.1-mile-long (50.1 km) river in the Appalachian Mountains of Hardy County in West Virginia's Potomac Highlands region. The Lost River is geologically the same river as the Cacapon River: it flows into an underground channel northeast of McCauley along West Virginia Route 259 at "the Sinks" and reappears near Wardensville as the Cacapon. The source of the Lost River lies south of Mathias near the West Virginia/Virginia border. Along with the Cacapon and North Rivers, the Lost River serves as one of the three main segments of the Cacapon River and its watershed.

The river is listed as impaired due to pathogens by the state of West Virginia; this is likely due to the livestock and poultry raising activities throughout the valley.

The river was named for the fact it is a losing stream.

== Tributaries ==
Tributary streams are listed from south (source) to north ("the Sinks").

- Culler Run
- Snyder Run
- Upper Cove Run
- Howards Lick Run
- Whitehead Run
- Lower Cove Run
  - Adams Run
- Mill Gap Run
- Kimsey Run
  - Camp Branch
  - Gap Run
- Fravel Run
- Baker Run
  - Long Lick Run
  - Camp Branch
- Three Springs Run

== Cities and towns along the Lost River ==
- Baker
- Lost City
- Lost River
- Mathias
- McCauley

== See also ==
- List of West Virginia rivers
- Lost River State Park
