= Nicholas Switzer House =

Historic house in West Virginia, United States

- U.S. National Register of Historic Places
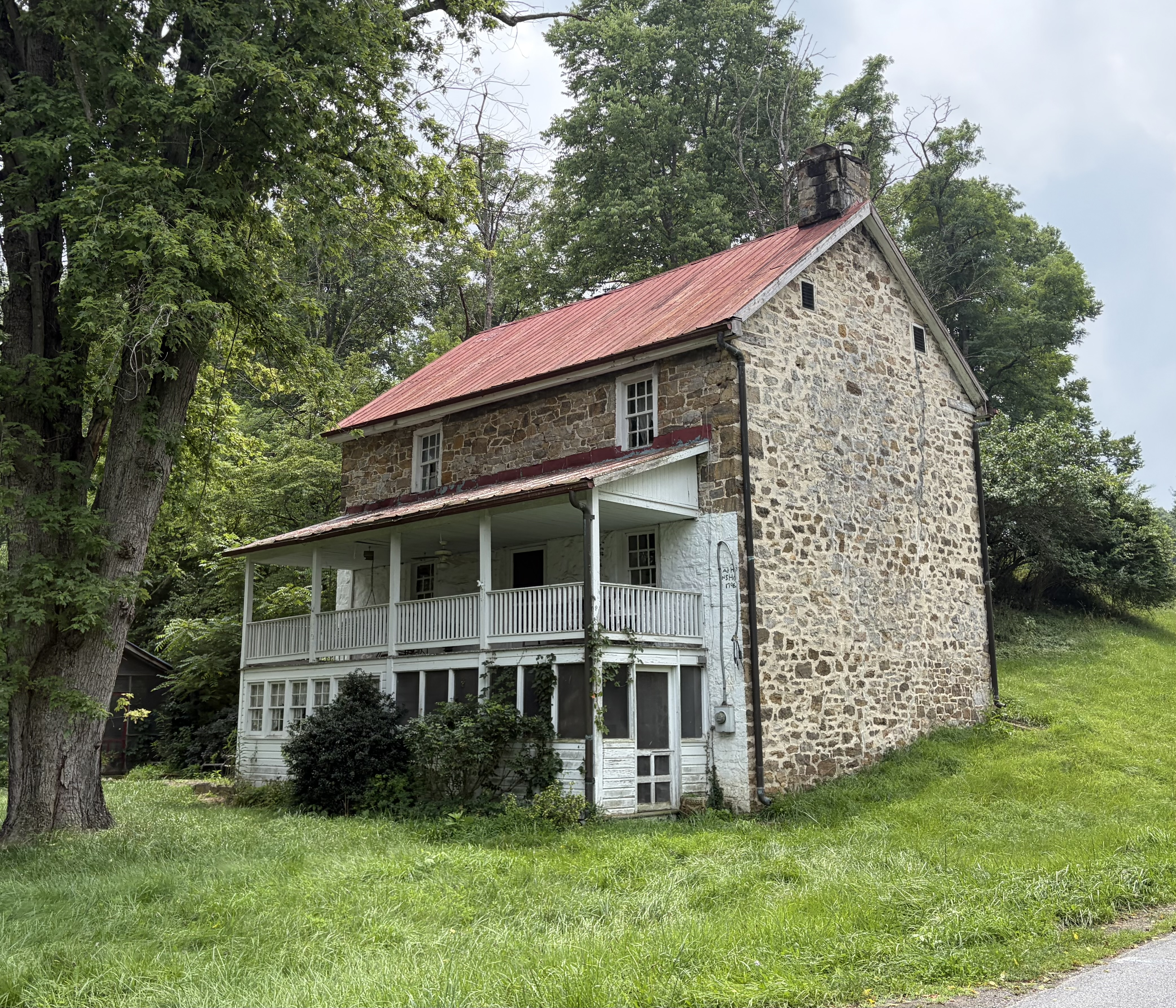
- The Nicholas Switzer House in 2026

- Location within Eastern Panhandle of West Virginia Location within West Virginia Location within the United States
- Location: County Route 5 and Waites Run, near Wardensville, West Virginia
- Coordinates: 39°4′50″N 78°34′48″W
- Area: 1.5 acres (0.61 ha)
- Built: 1778
- Architect: Nicholas Switzer
- Architectural style: I-house
- NRHP reference No.: 08001238
- Added to NRHP: December 24, 2008

Nicholas Switzer House, also known as The Old Stone House and "Switzerland," is a historic home located near Wardensville, Hardy County, West Virginia. The house was built in 1788, and is a two-story I-house with a lower-level and attic constructed of uncoursed fieldstone. It sits on a stone foundation and has a side-gable, standing seam metal roof. The rear elevation features a two-story porch built about 1880. The Switzer family were Swiss German immigrants.

It was listed on the National Register of Historic Places in 2008.
