= Peter Nead =

German Baptist Brethren theologian (1796–1877)

Peter Nead (7 January 1796 – 16 March 1877) was an American preacher in the German Baptist Brethren church that descended from the Schwarzenau Brethren. He wrote several theological works, which were (and remain) influential in the Old German Baptist Brethren and related churches, perhaps the most prominent being "A Vindication of Primitive Christianity."

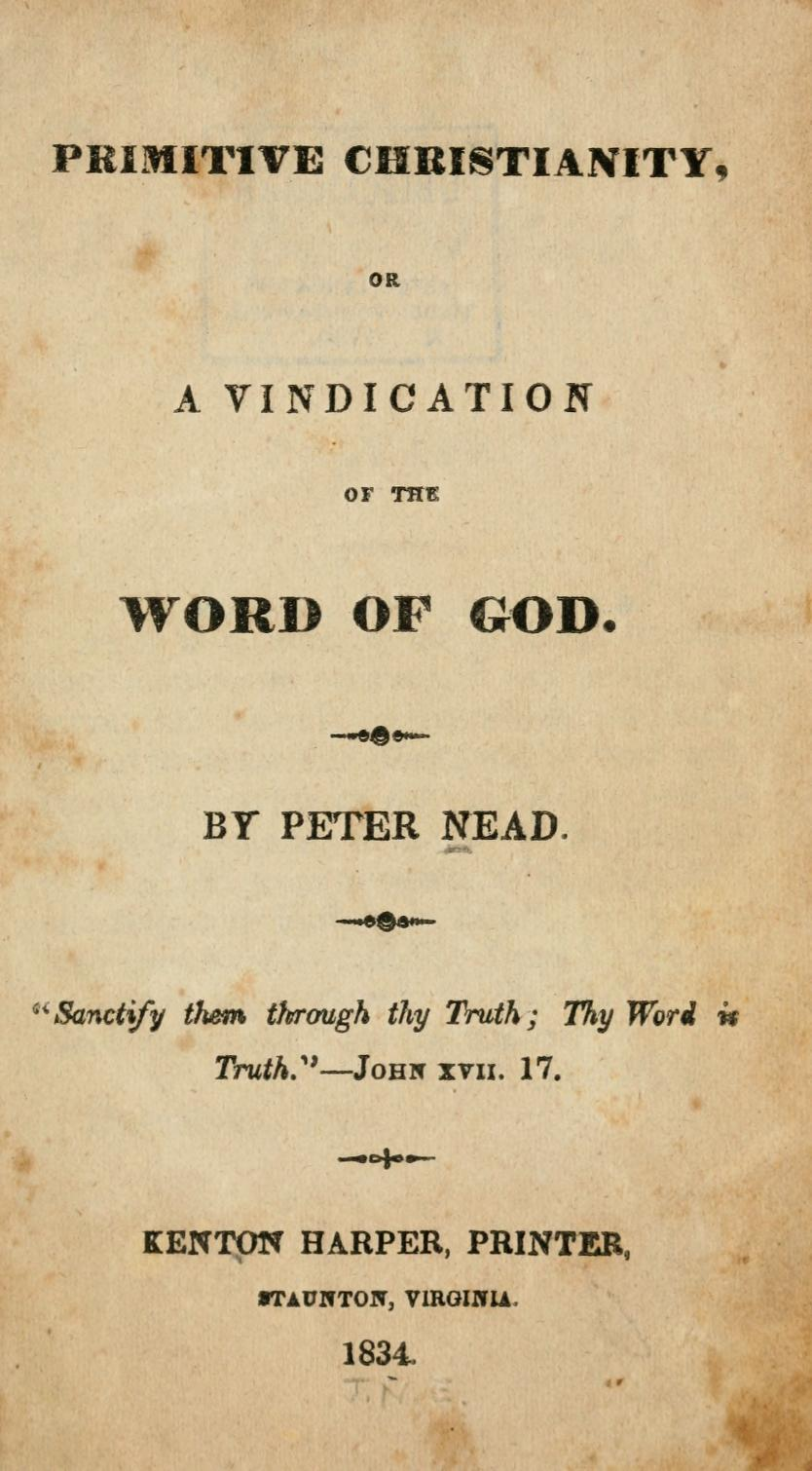
Title page of Nead's Primitive Christianity, 1834.

== Life ==
Nead was born in Hagerstown, Maryland, and was raised as a Lutheran. His family wanted him to become a Lutheran preacher, but he instead chose to learn the trade of a tanner. He later converted to the Methodist church, but then after reading a pamphlet from the Brethren church converted to that faith, and soon took up preaching. In 1825 he married Elizabeth Yount, originally of Rockingham County, Virginia. He resided at the Tunker House until 1839. He later relocated to Augusta County, Virginia, then Botetourt County, and finally settled in 1850 near Dayton, Ohio, where remained until his death, preaching at the Lower Stillwater church.

== Ministry ==
Nead was known as the "English preacher" because of his ability to preach in English. Ultimately his greatest impact was in his writings, as books and pamphlets could travel many places where he could not. In 1833 he published "A Vindication of Primitive Christianity," which was widely read. In 1845 he published "Baptism for the Remission of Sins." Both of these works were published together in 1850 as "Nead's Theological Works." His last book, "The Wisdom and Power of God, as Displayed in Creation and Redemption," was published in 1866. He assisted in launching and was a frequent contributor to the church periodical The Vindicator, which was largely devoted to advocating against progressive reformation of the Anabaptist church.
