= Lost City, West Virginia =

- Unincorporated community
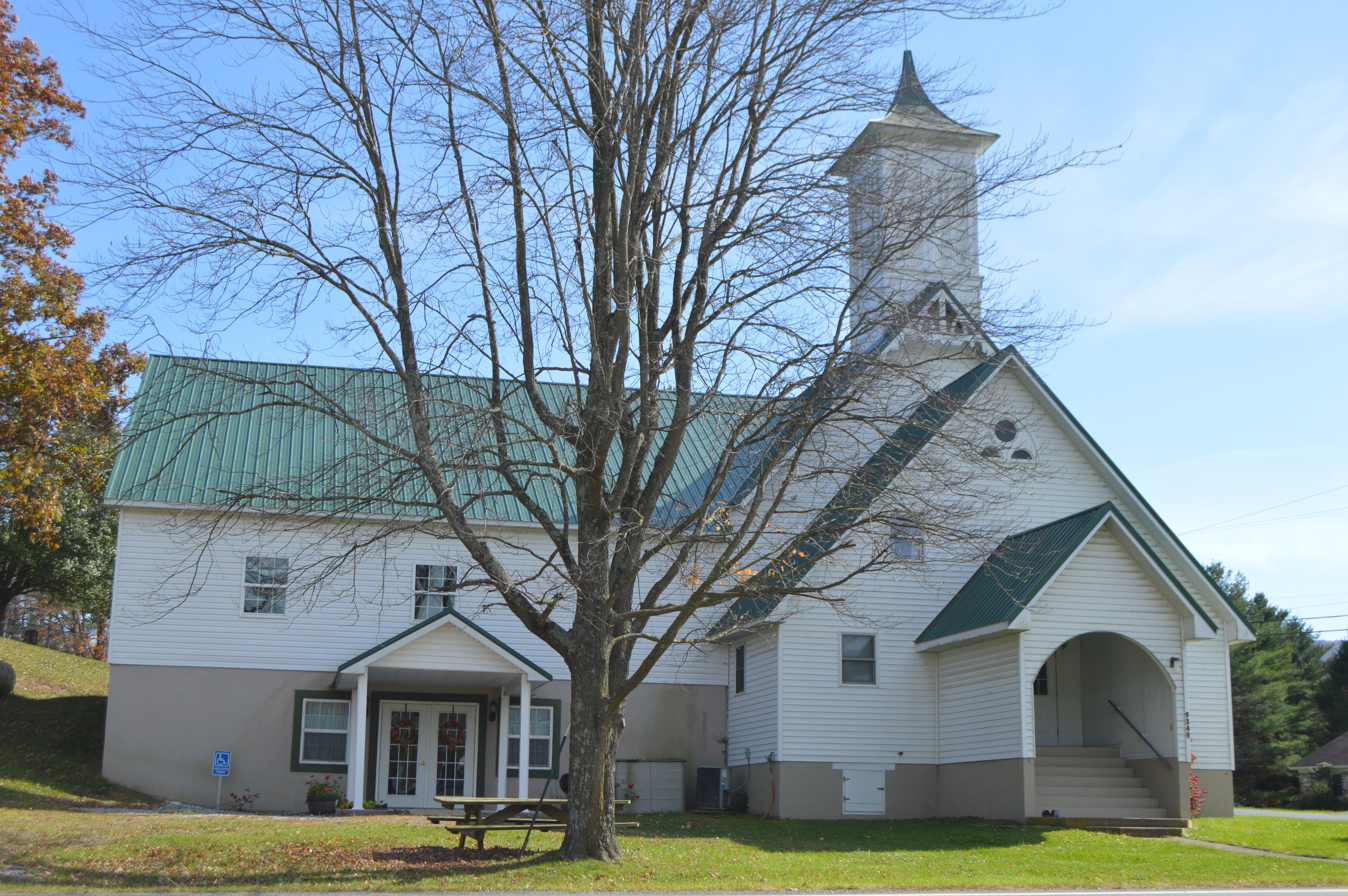
- Baptist church on West Virginia Route 259

- Location within West Virginia Location within the United States
- Coordinates: 38°55′47″N 78°50′3″W
- Country: United States
- State: West Virginia
- County: Hardy
- Time zone: UTC-5 (Eastern (EST))
  - Summer (DST): UTC-4 (EDT)
- ZIP codes: 26810
- GNIS feature ID: 1551940

Lost City is an unincorporated community in eastern Hardy County, West Virginia, United States, on the Lost River. Lost City is centered at the intersection of West Virginia routes 59 and 259. The town was originally known as Cover. Its post office has been open since 1892.

The community takes its name from the nearby Lost River.
