= Mathias, West Virginia =

- Unincorporated community
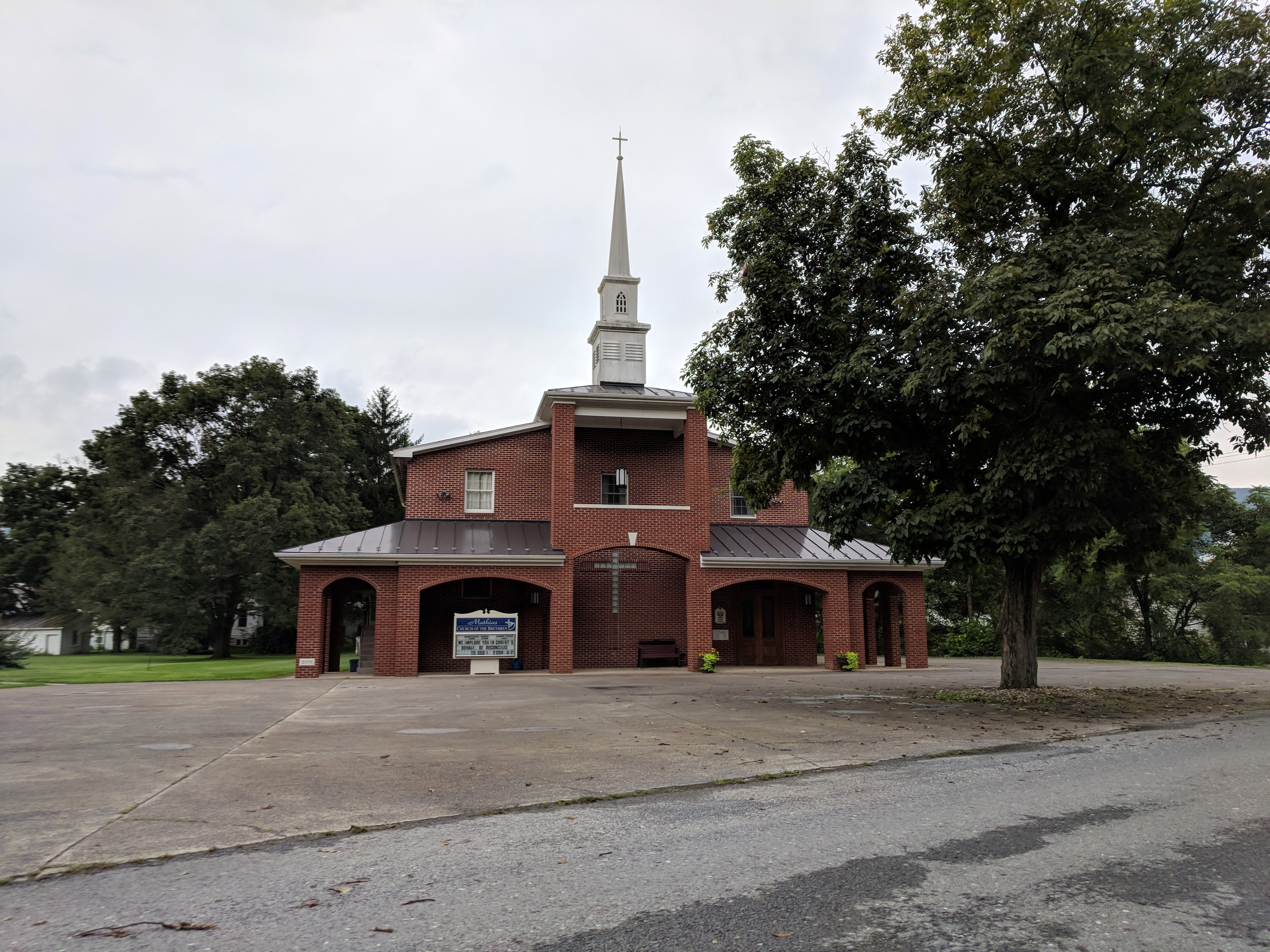
- Church of the Brethren in Mathias

- Location within West Virginia Location within the United States
- Coordinates: 38°52′40″N 78°51′58″W
- Country: United States
- State: West Virginia
- County: Hardy
- Elevation: 1,567 ft (478 m)
- Time zone: UTC-5 (Eastern (EST))
  - Summer (DST): UTC-4 (EDT)
- ZIP code: 26812
- GNIS feature ID: 1555067

Mathias is an unincorporated community along the Lost River in Hardy County in the U.S. state of West Virginia. Mathias lies off West Virginia Route 259. Before the consolidated school of East Hardy High School at Baker, Mathias had its own educational facility, Mathias School, which served grades kindergarten through twelfth.

Mathias has one bank (Summit Community Bank), one restaurant, a post office, a new garage, one community center, one gas station, a fitness center, as well as Lost River State Park. It was founded by John Mathias and contains his historic homestead, the John Mathias House.

== Climate ==
The climate in this area is characterized by hot, humid summers and generally mild to cool winters. According to the Köppen Climate Classification system, Mathias has a humid subtropical climate, abbreviated "Cfa" on climate maps.
