= Francis Kotz Farm =

Historic house in West Virginia, United States

- U.S. National Register of Historic Places
- Location within Eastern Panhandle of West Virginia Location within West Virginia Location within the United States
- Location: 27625 WV 55, near Wardensville, West Virginia
- Coordinates: 39°4′39″N 78°36′16″W
- Area: 150 acres (61 ha)
- Architect: Francis "Franz" Kotz
- Architectural style: Greek Revival
- NRHP reference No.: 08001237
- Added to NRHP: December 22, 2008

Francis Kotz Farm, also known as The Kotz Place, is a historic home located near Wardensville, Hardy County, West Virginia. The house was built about 1860, and is a two-story, four-room Greek Revival style brick house, with side gable roof. A two-story addition was built about 1875. The house sits on a stone foundation. Also on the property is a three-story frame building built as the original Kotz family home in the 1850s. It also housed a wood-working shop. The contributing barn was built about 1865.

It was listed on the National Register of Historic Places in 2008.
