= Wardensville, West Virginia =

- Town
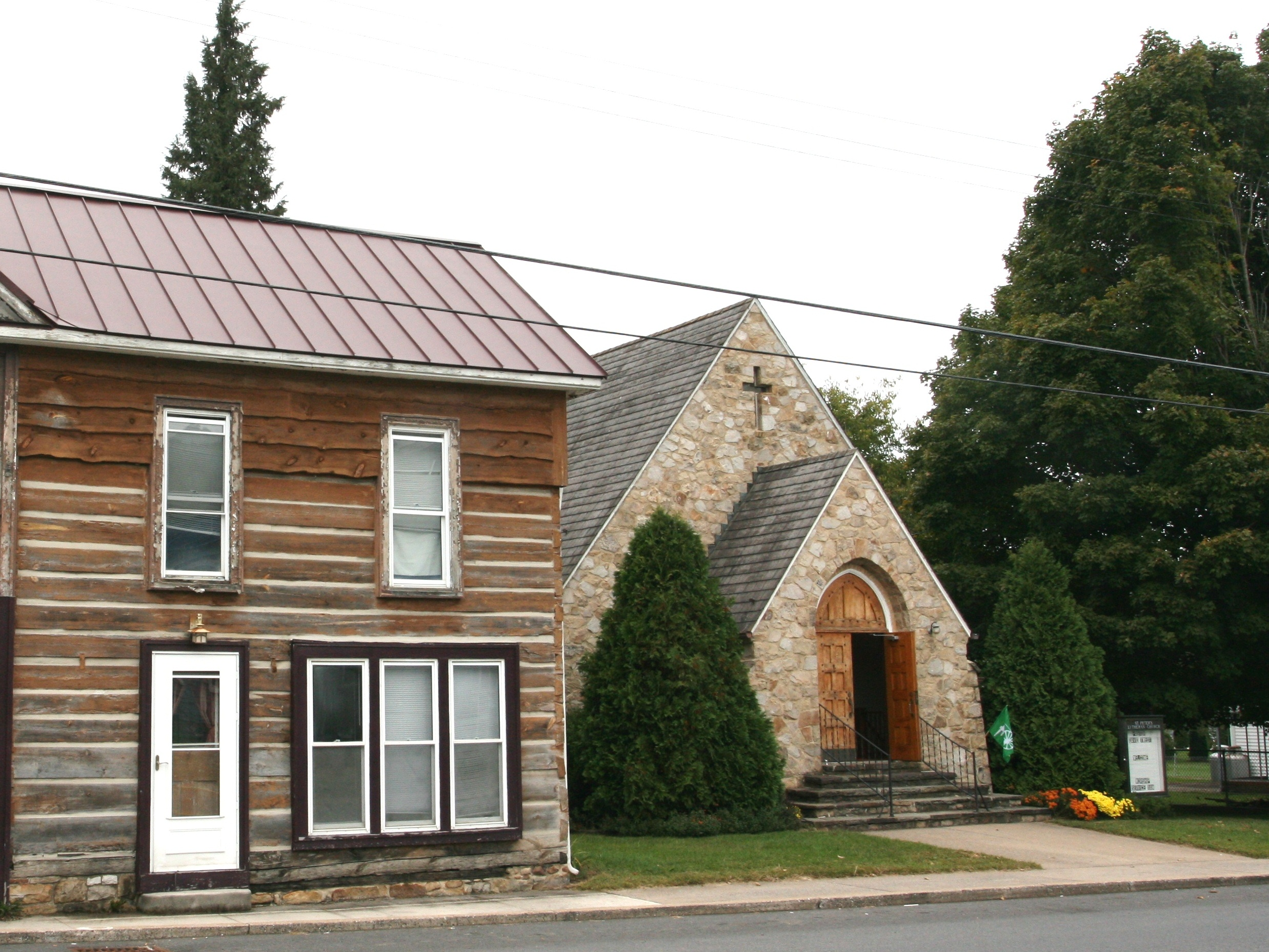
- Historic structures along Main Street in Wardensville, West Virginia

- Logo

- Location of Wardensville in Hardy County, West Virginia

- Location within West Virginia
- Coordinates: 39°4′32″N 78°35′40″W
- Country: United States
- State: West Virginia
- County: Hardy
- Chartered: 1832
- Incorporated: 1879

Government Town Council is made up of five Councilors, a Mayor and a Recorder
  - Type: Mayor/Council
  - Mayor: Betsy Orndoff-Sayers (M)

Area
  - Total: 0.33 sq mi (0.85 km^{2})
  - Land: 0.32 sq mi (0.84 km^{2})
  - Water: 0.0039 sq mi (0.01 km^{2})
- Elevation: 1,010 ft (308 m)

Population (2020)
  - Total: 269
  - Estimate (2021): 267
  - Density: 800/sq mi (307/km^{2})
- Time zone: UTC-5 (Eastern (EST))
  - Summer (DST): UTC-4 (EDT)
- ZIP code: 26851
- Area code: 304
- FIPS code: 54-84580
- GNIS feature ID: 1553382
- Website: wardensville.com

Wardensville is a town in Hardy County, West Virginia, United States. The population was 265 at the 2020 census. Originally named Trout Run, Wardensville was chartered in Virginia in 1832 and incorporated in West Virginia in 1879. Wardensville is located west of the Great North Mountain range, which separates it from the Shenandoah Valley. The town lies on the east bank of the Cacapon River at its confluence with Trout Run. The George Washington and Jefferson National Forests administrative entity borders the town to its east and south.

== History ==
The land that Wardensville occupies was originally part of the Northern Neck Proprietary, a 5 million acre tract granted by England's King Charles II and formally established after the restoration of the English monarchy in 1660. In 1719, the land was inherited by Thomas Fairfax, 6th Lord Fairfax of Cameron who administered many of the land grants to the early European settlers who began arriving in the Capon Valley in the second quarter of the eighteenth century. William H. Warden is believed to be the first settler within the present town. He received a parcel of land from Thomas Fairfax, reportedly surveyed by George Washington, on November 11, 1749.

During the French and Indian War, hostilities between the English settlers and the Native American populations in the South Branch and Capon Valleys led to the construction of a string of fortified outposts including Fort Warden or "Warden's Fort," erected by William Warden at a place called Trout Run (later the town of Wardensville). According to historian Samuel Kercheval, the fort was attacked in 1758 when it was burned. Warden and a man only known by the name Mr. Taff did not survive the attack.

The town of Wardensville was established in 1832 when the Virginia General Assembly granted a charter declaring "that the town of Wardensville, in the county of Hardy, as the same has been heretofore laid off into lots, streets and alleys, or as the same may be hereafter further laid off and extended into lots, streets and alleys, shall be, and the same is hereby made a town corporate, to be known and distinguished by the name of Wardensville." The first trustees of the town were James Scanting, Samuel Fry, John Pierce, Simon Switzer, and James W. Baker. The town was incorporated by the West Virginia Legislature in 1879.

In the 1820 United States census, the population center of the United States was recorded as being about 3 miles northeast of the town.

Historic structures in the town include the Cline Blacksmith Shop/Town Jail, a stone structure on Main Street erected around 1830. Two generations of the Cline family operated a blacksmith shop in the structure until 1895. In the earl twentieth century, the structure was converted for use as a town jail. St. Peter's Lutheran Church was founded in 1840 by Rev. John Hamilton and erected its first church on the site in 1870. After this building collapsed in 1934, the present stone church, designed by A. Hensel Fink, was constructed in Gothic Revival style. The Old Presbyterian Church was constructed in the latter half of the nineteenth century and is a rare example of Italianate style in Wardensville. The Odd Fellows Hall was erected in 1856 on the southern edge of town near the intersection of Main Street and Trout Run Road.

Two properties near Wardensville are listed on the National Register of Historic Places: the Francis Kotz Farm and the Nicholas Switzer House.

=== Gallery ===
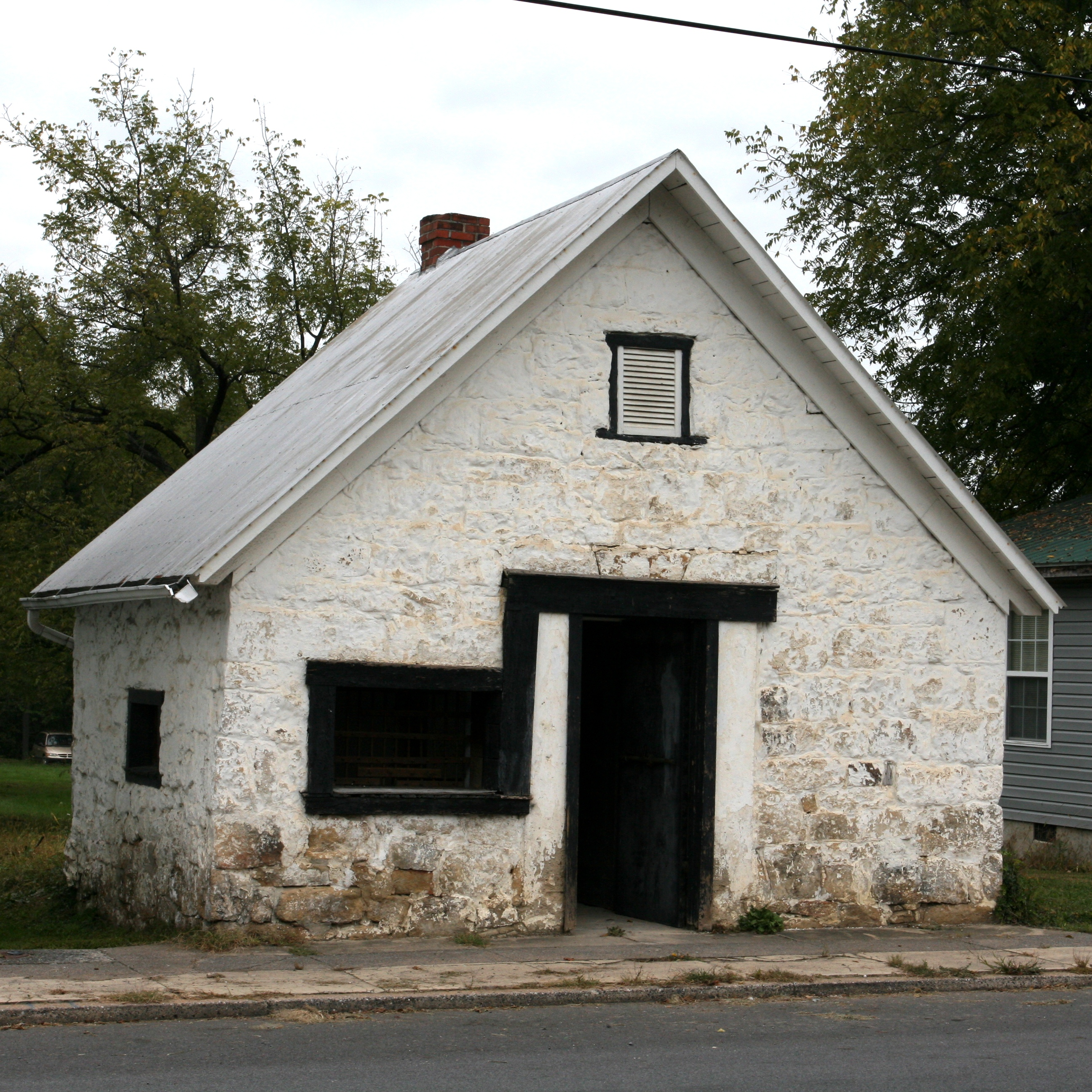

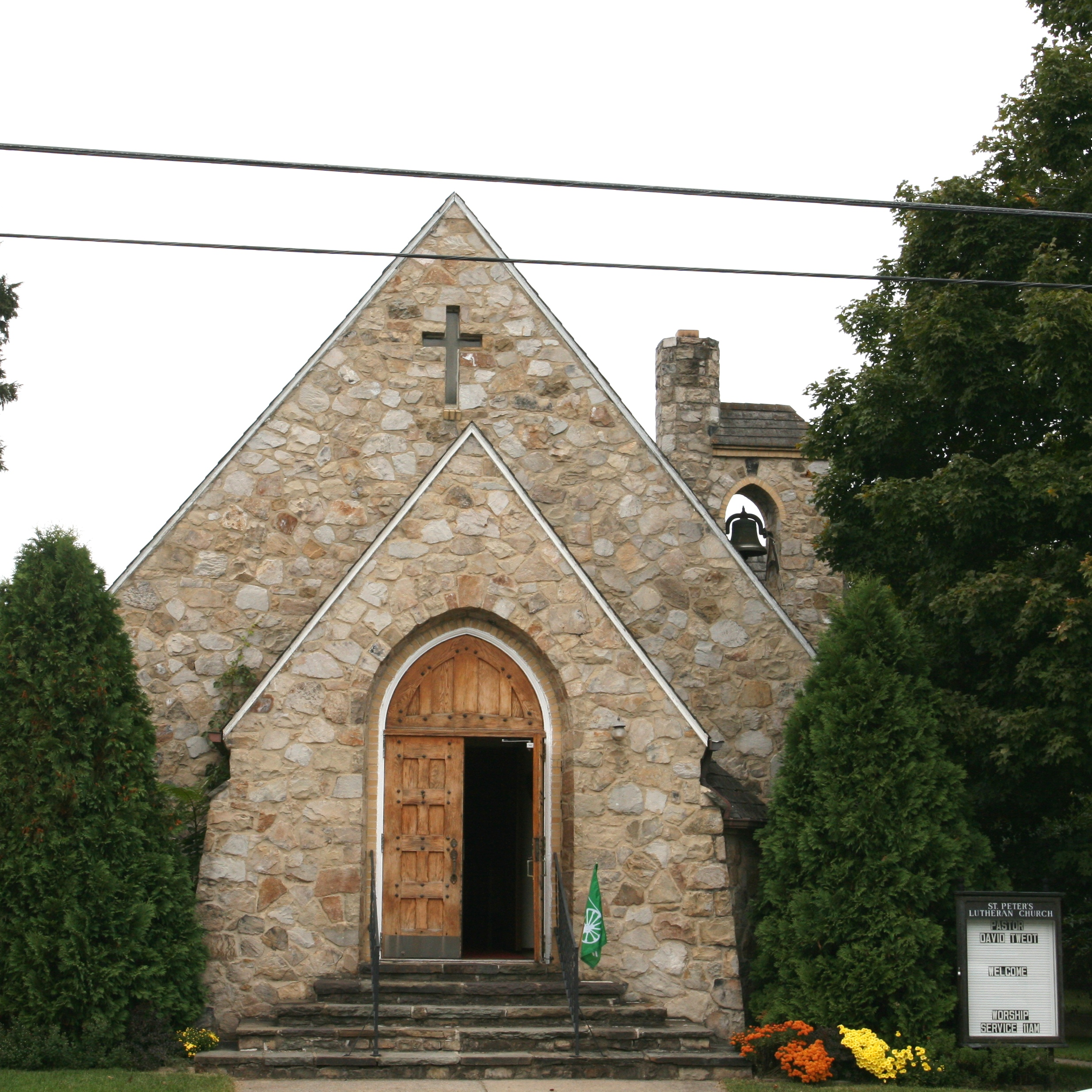

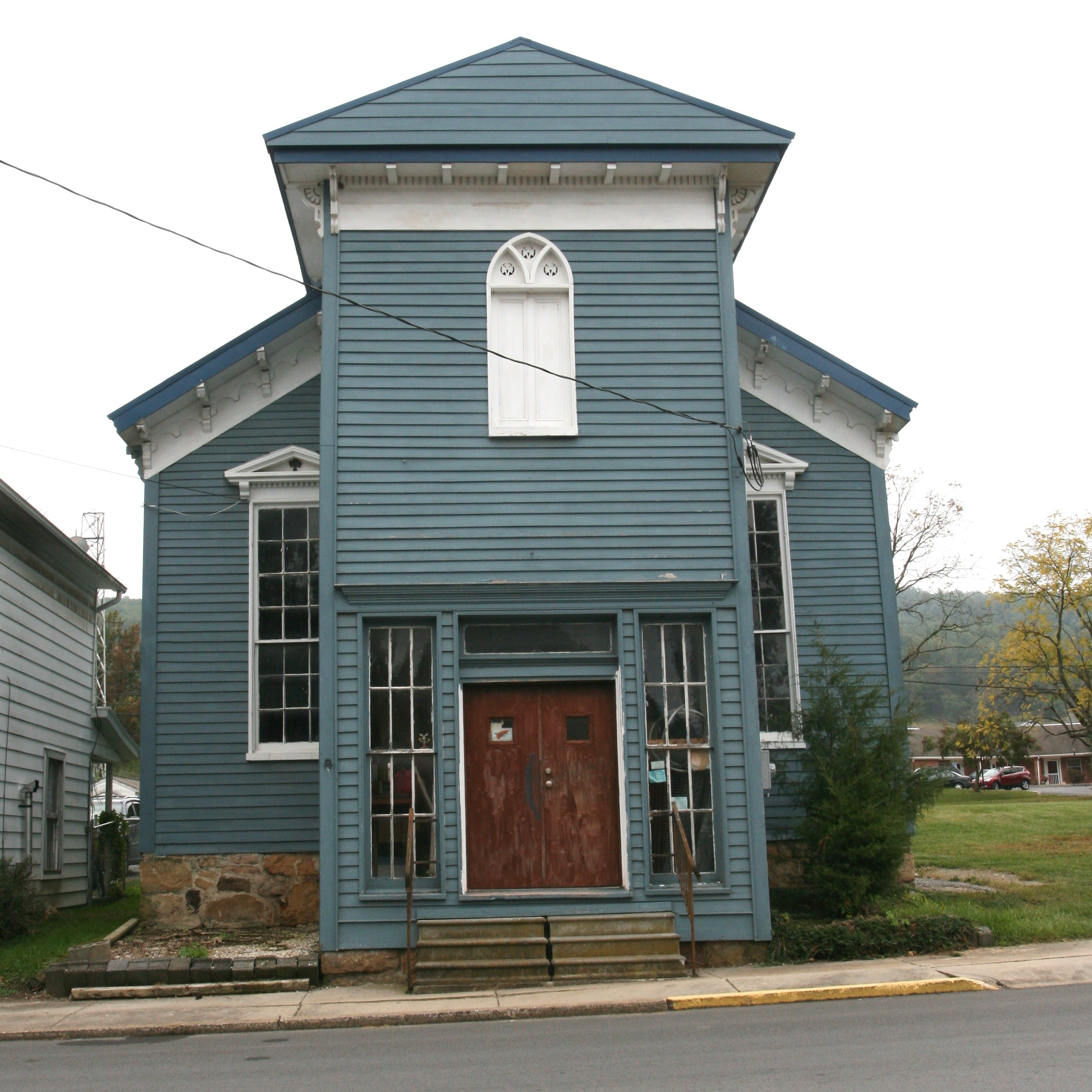

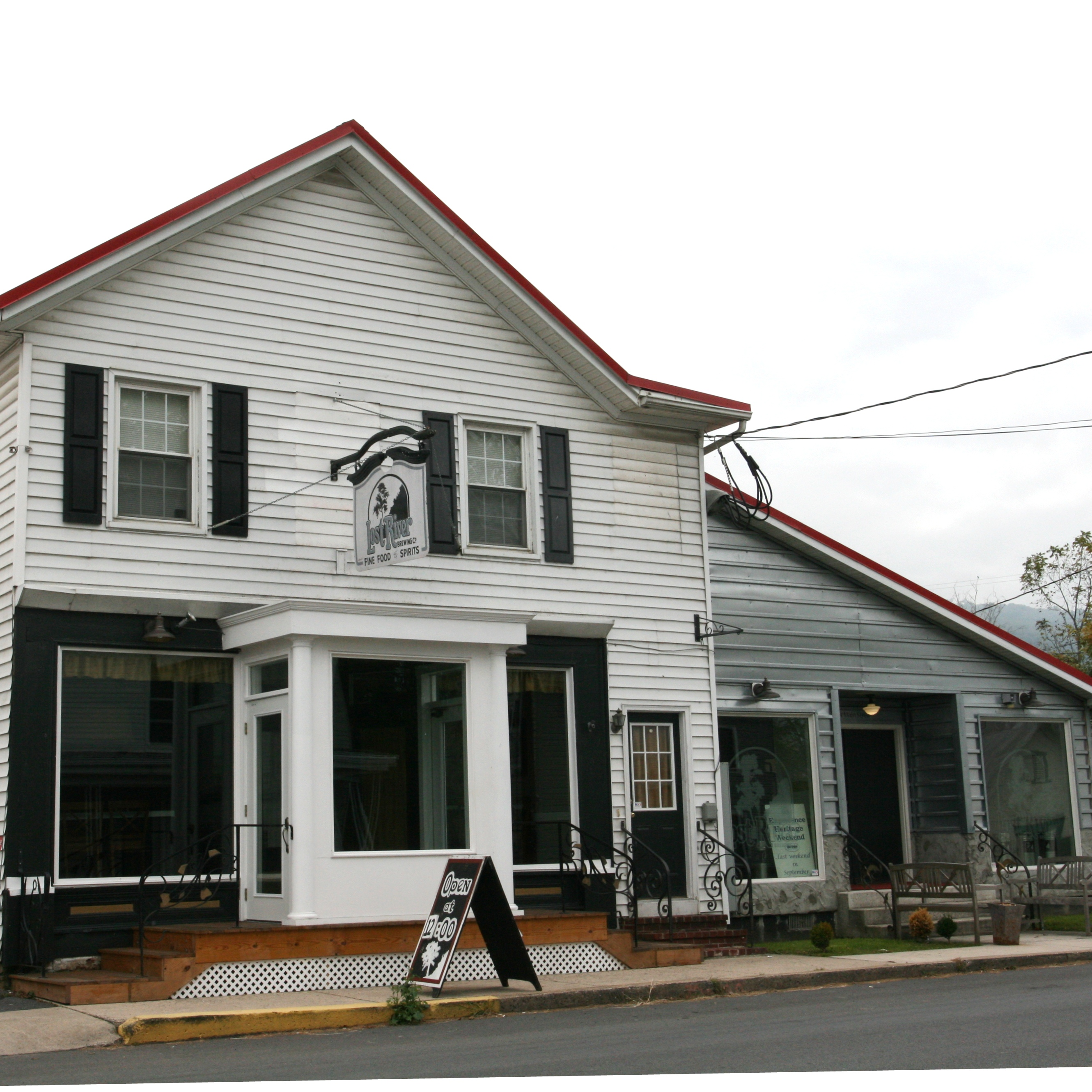

== Transportation ==
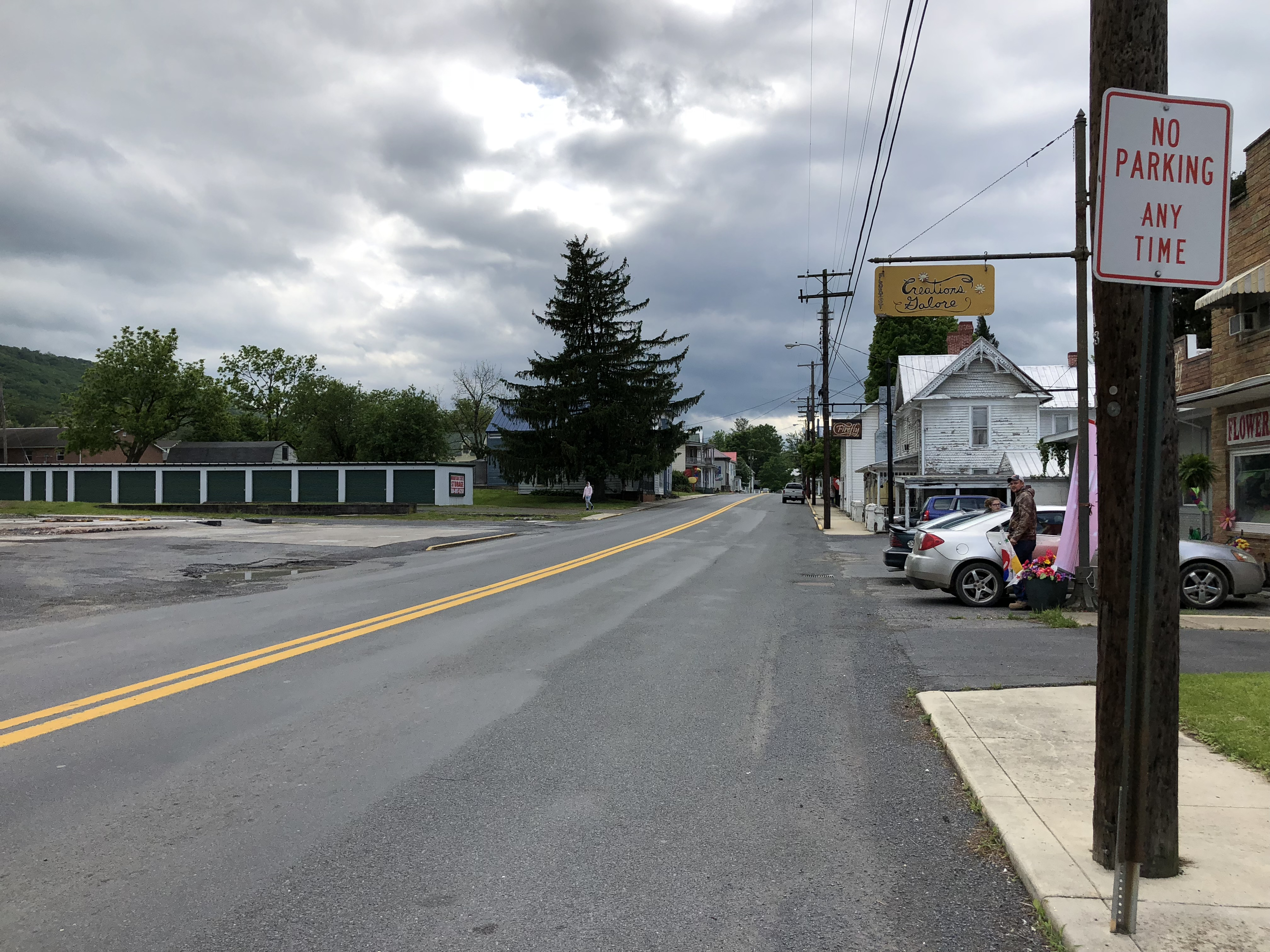
US 48, WV 55 and WV 259 along Main Street in Wardensville

=== Roadways ===
Three highways technically serve Wardensville, though they all run concurrently through the town, which in effect makes them one single highway. U.S. Route 48 is the most prominent of these. Long range plans have this road and its state highway companions, West Virginia Route 55 and West Virginia Route 259, slated for a realignment around Wardensville. At present, however, all three roads run through downtown Wardensville along Main Street. U.S. Route 48 and WV 55 continues west to Moorefield and east to Strasburg. WV 259 heads southwest and northeast, but serves virtually no significant population centers.

=== Public Transportation ===
Routes 102 and 201 serve the town. This service is offered by the Potomac Valley Transit Authority (PVTA). Bus 102 serves the community at Marina's Pizza along with Petersburg, WV and Winchester, VA. Route 201 serves the town as the fire station and travels to Petersburg, WV.

== Geography ==
Wardensville is located at 39°4′32″N 78°35′40″W (39.075573, -78.594534).

According to the United States Census Bureau, the town has a total area of 0.33 square miles (0.85 km^{2}), of which 0.32 square miles (0.83 km^{2}) is land and 0.01 square miles (0.03 km^{2}) is water.

A whitewater stretch of the Lost River flows just above the town from the southwest and once it reaches Wardensville is renamed the Cacapon River. The stream continues to flow northeasterly towards its eventual destination at the Potomac River.

== Demographics ==
Historical population
| Census | Pop. | Note | %± |
|---|---|---|---|
| 1880 | 123 | | — |
| 1890 | 106 | | −13.8% |
| 1900 | 152 | | 43.4% |
| 1910 | 123 | | −19.1% |
| 1920 | 745 | | 505.7% |
| 1930 | 189 | | −74.6% |
| 1940 | 195 | | 3.2% |
| 1950 | 171 | | −12.3% |
| 1960 | 289 | | 69.0% |
| 1970 | 288 | | −0.3% |
| 1980 | 241 | | −16.3% |
| 1990 | 140 | | −41.9% |
| 2000 | 246 | | 75.7% |
| 2010 | 271 | | 10.2% |
| 2020 | 269 | | −0.7% |
| 2021 (est.) | 267 | ▼ | −0.7% |
U.S. Decennial Census

=== 2010 census ===
As of the census of 2010, there were 271 people, 126 households, and 67 families living in the town. The population density was 846.9 inhabitants per square mile (327.0/km^{2}). There were 154 housing units at an average density of 481.3 per square mile (185.8/km^{2}). The racial makeup of the town was 96.3% White, 1.8% African American, 1.1% Asian, and 0.7% from other races. Hispanic or Latino of any race were 2.2% of the population.

There were 126 households, of which 25.4% had children under the age of 18 living with them, 40.5% were married couples living together, 10.3% had a female householder with no husband present, 2.4% had a male householder with no wife present, and 46.8% were non-families. 42.9% of all households were made up of individuals, and 19.8% had someone living alone who was 65 years of age or older. The average household size was 2.15 and the average family size was 3.01.

The median age in the town was 45.3 years. 19.2% of residents were under the age of 18; 7.8% were between the ages of 18 and 24; 22.2% were from 25 to 44; 33.2% were from 45 to 64; and 17.7% were 65 years of age or older. The gender makeup of the town was 47.6% male and 52.4% female.

=== 2000 census ===
As of the census of 2000, there were 246 people, 104 households, and 63 families living in the town. The population density was 798.1 inhabitants per square mile (306.4/km^{2}). There were 126 housing units at an average density of 408.8 per square mile (156.9/km^{2}). The racial makeup of the town was 95.93% White, 0.81% African American, 0.41% Native American, 0.81% Asian, 1.63% from other races, and 0.41% from two or more races.

There were 104 households, out of which 27.9% had children under the age of 18 living with them, 49.0% were married couples living together, 8.7% had a female householder with no husband present, and 38.5% were non-families. 35.6% of all households were made up of individuals, and 22.1% had someone living alone who was 65 years of age or older. The average household size was 2.34 and the average family size was 3.05.

In the town, the population was spread out, with 25.2% under the age of 18 5.3% from 18 to 24, 31.7% from 25 to 44, 20.7% from 45 to 64, and 17.1% who were 65 years of age or older. The median age was 37 years. For every 100 females, there were 75.7 males. For every 100 females age 18 and over, there were 70.4 males. The median income for a household in the town was $28,864, and the median income for a family was $41,875. Males had a median income of $30,000 versus $22,143 for females. The per capita income for the town was $19,037. About 8.5% of families and 10.2% of the population were below the poverty line, including none of those under the age of eighteen and 21.4% of those 65 or over.
