= Henepola =

- Village
- Country: Sri Lanka
- Province: Central Province
- Time zone: UTC+5:30 (Sri Lanka Standard Time)

Henepola is a Sri Lankan village within Central Province.

== See also ==
- List of towns in Central Province, Sri Lanka
