= John Mathias House =

Historic house in West Virginia, United States

- U.S. National Register of Historic Places
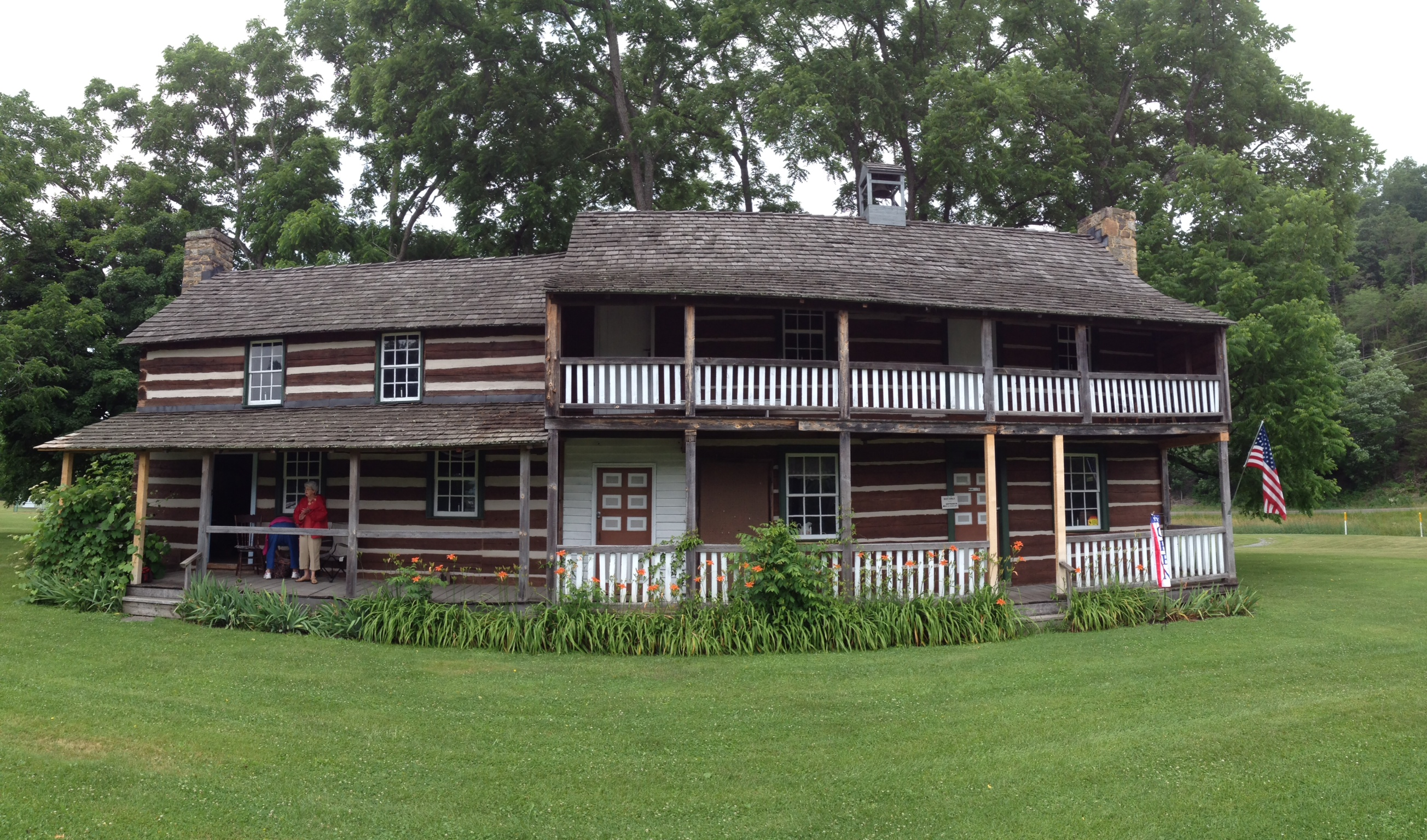

- Location within Eastern Panhandle of West Virginia Location within West Virginia Location within the United States
- Location: WV 259, Mathias, West Virginia
- Coordinates: 38°52′39″N 78°52′3″W
- Area: 2 acres (0.81 ha)
- Built: c. 1797, c. 1825
- Architectural style: Log building
- NRHP reference No.: 78002796
- Added to NRHP: November 24, 1978

John Mathias House, also known as the Mathias Homestead, is a historic home located at Mathias, Hardy County, West Virginia. It consists of two sections, one built about 1797 and the second about 1825. The two hewn-log sections are joined by a frame "dog trot," or what has been referred to locally as the "entry." The older section is two stories with a double porch and lightly taller than the newer section. It was home to the Mathias family for 165 years before being deeded to the Mathias Civic Center Association in 1974.

It was listed on the National Register of Historic Places in 1978.
