= Lost River General Store =

- U.S. National Register of Historic Places
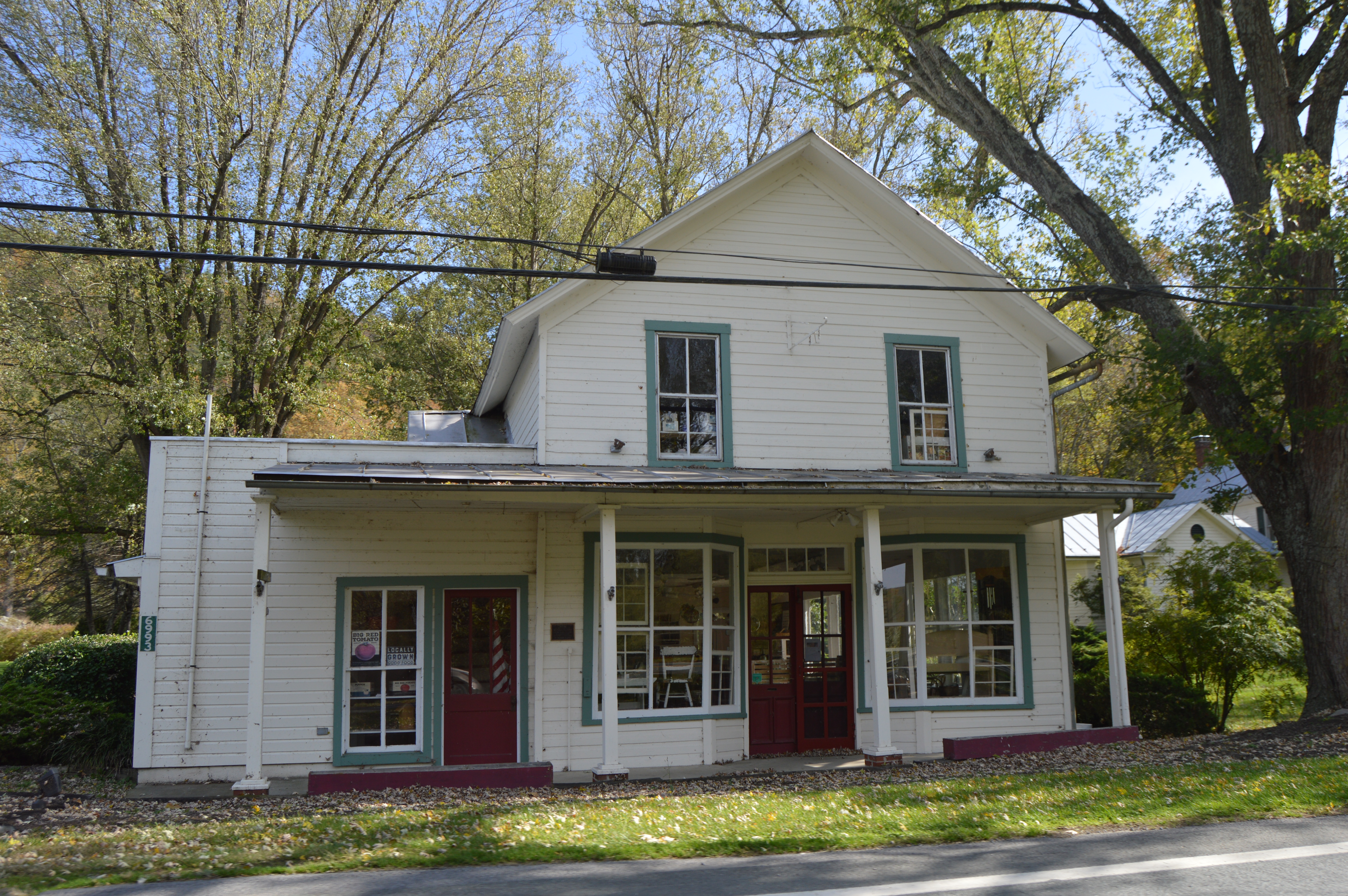
- Facade

- Location within Eastern Panhandle of West Virginia Location within West Virginia Location within the United States
- Location: 6993 WV 259, Lost River, West Virginia
- Coordinates: 38°57′17″N 78°48′16″W
- Area: less than one acre
- Built: 1898
- Built by: Lynn S. Holmes
- Architectural style: Early Commercial
- NRHP reference No.: 05001349
- Added to NRHP: November 30, 2005

Lost River General Store, also known as Lost River Store House, is a historic general store located on the grounds of The Inn at Lost River at Lost River, Hardy County, West Virginia. It was built in 1898, and is a two-story, front-gable, wood-frame building with a one-story front porch. The front section measures approximately 20 feet by 40 feet. The store building was renovated in the 1990s. From the early 1900s (decade) until 1979, the building also housed the Lost River Post Office. Also on the property is an outhouse that may have been built in the 1930s by a Works Progress Administration (WPA) crew.

It was listed on the National Register of Historic Places in 2005.

Temporarily closed in 2020, the store and the inn reopened in 2021 under new ownership.
