= Broadway, Virginia =

Town in Virginia, United States

- Town
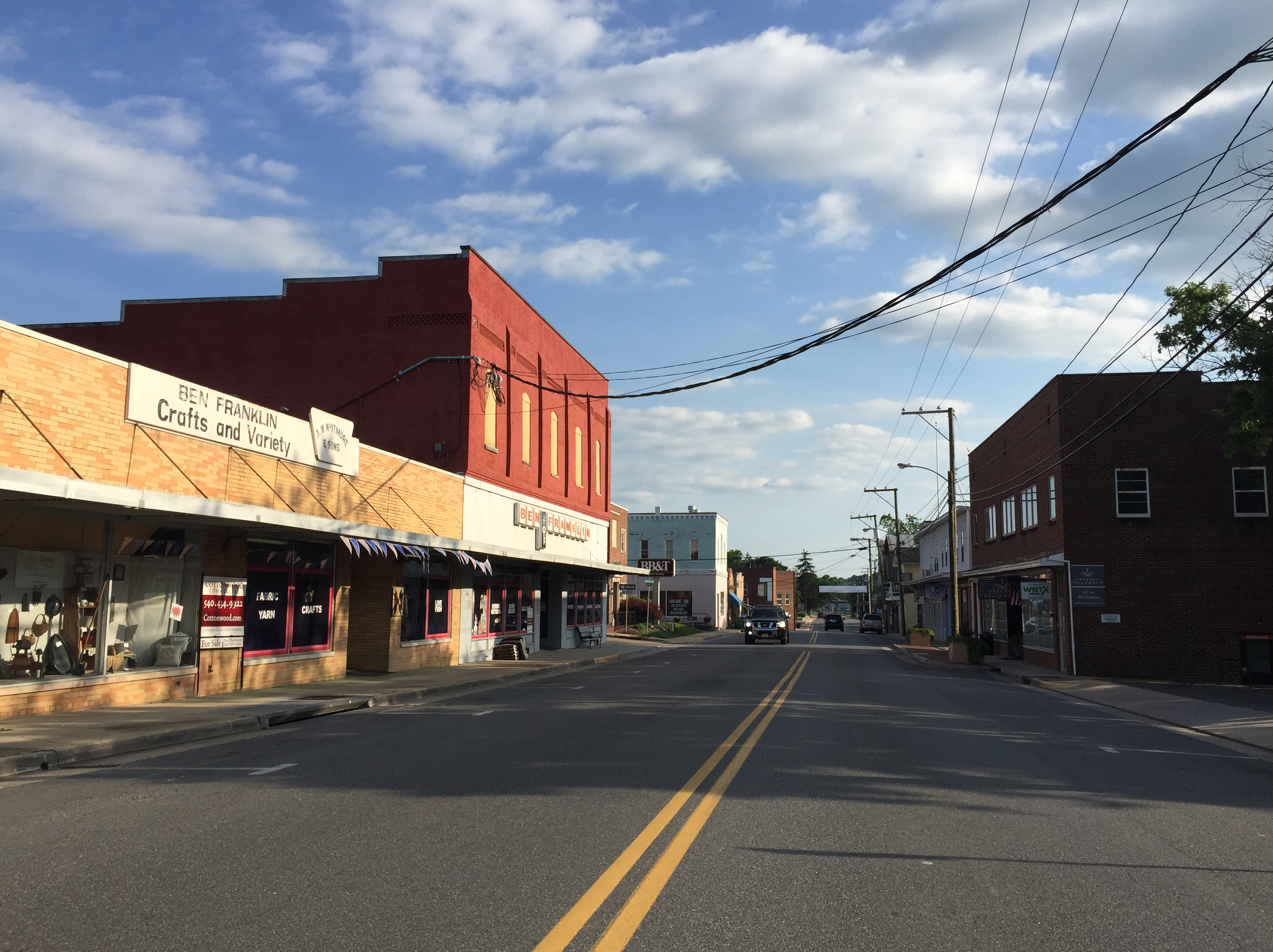
- Main Street in Broadway

- Seal

- Location of Broadway within Rockingham County

- Location in Virginia Broadway, Virginia (the United States)
- Coordinates: 38°36′43″N 78°47′57″W
- Country: United States
- State: Virginia
- County: Rockingham

Government
  - Mayor: David L. Jordan (I)
  - Town manager: Tracey Shiflett

Area
  - Total: 2.40 sq mi (6.22 km^{2})
  - Land: 2.37 sq mi (6.15 km^{2})
  - Water: 0.027 sq mi (0.07 km^{2})
- Elevation: 1,043 ft (318 m)

Population (2010)
  - Total: 4,170
  - Estimate (2019): 3,978
  - Density: 1,674.6/sq mi (646.57/km^{2})
- Time zone: UTC-5 (Eastern (EST))
  - Summer (DST): UTC-4 (EDT)
- ZIP code: 22815
- Area code: 540
- FIPS code: 51-10040
- GNIS feature ID: 1492636
- Website: Official website

Broadway is a town in Rockingham County, Virginia, United States. As of the 2020 census, Broadway had a population of 4,170. It is included in the Harrisonburg metropolitan area.

== Geography ==
Broadway is located at 38°36′43″N 78°47′57″W (38.611954, -78.799192).

According to the United States Census Bureau, the town has a total area of 1.8 square miles (4.7 km^{2}), all land.

== Transportation ==
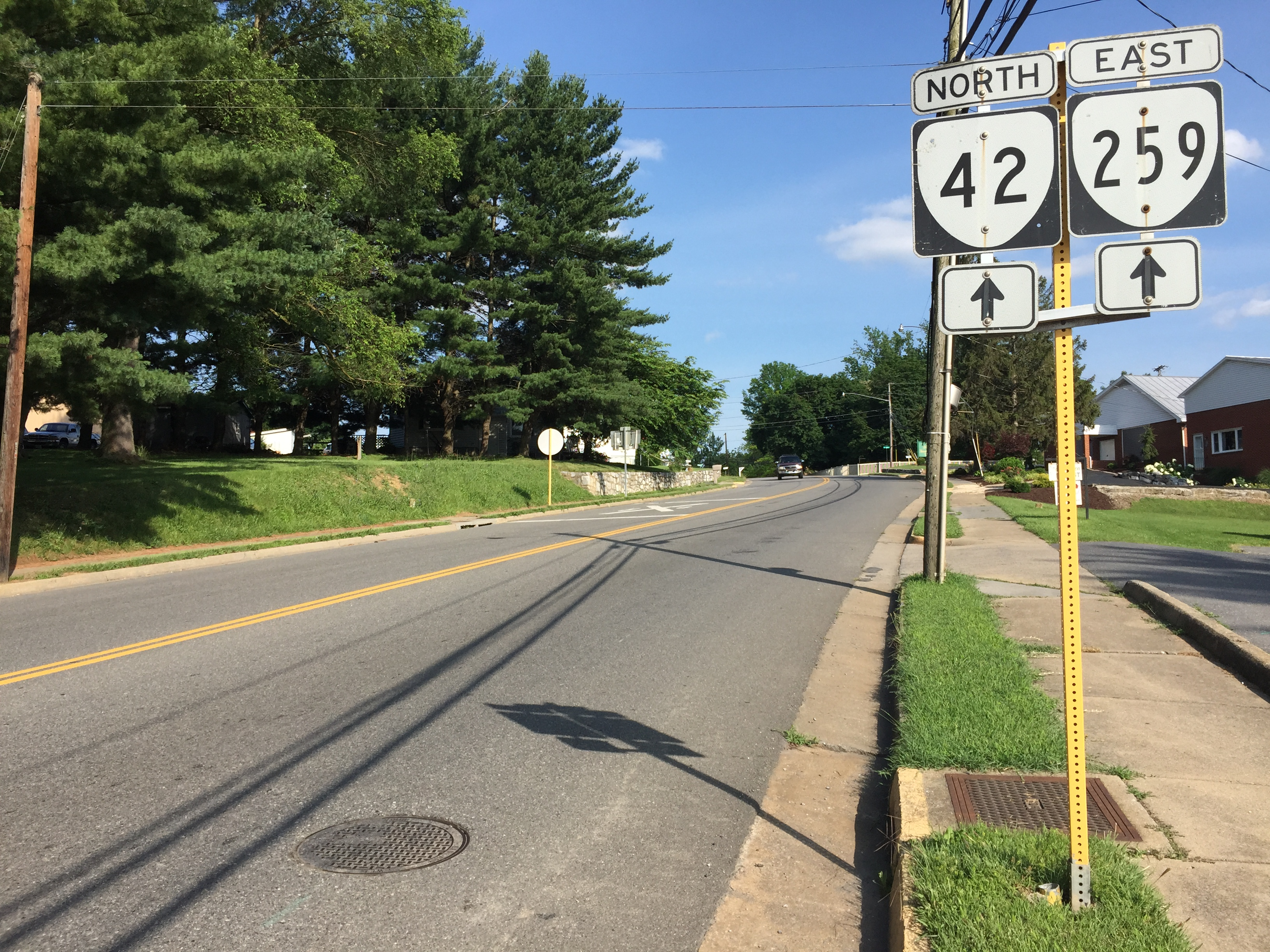
View north along SR 42 and east along SR 259 in Broadway

The primary roads serving Broadway are Virginia State Route 42 and Virginia State Route 259, which run concurrently for a short distance within the town limits. SR 42 connects north to Timberville, where it connects to Virginia State Route 211, and south to Harrisonburg, where it connects with U.S. Route 33. SR 259 connects east to Interstate 81 and west to West Virginia. An alternate routing of SR 259 also serves as a main road within Broadway.

== Climate ==
The climate in this area is characterized by hot, humid summers and generally mild to cool winters. According to the Köppen Climate Classification system, Broadway has a humid subtropical climate, abbreviated "Cfa" on climate maps.

== Demographics ==
Historical population
Census	Pop.	Note	%±
1880	323		—
1890	497		53.9%
1900	400		−19.5%
1910	416		4.0%
1920	412		−1.0%
1930	498		20.9%
1940	506		1.6%
1950	561		10.9%
1960	646		15.2%
1970	887		37.3%
1980	1,234		39.1%
1990	1,209		−2.0%
2000	2,192		81.3%
2010	3,691		68.4%
2020	4,170		13.0%
U.S. Decennial Census

=== 2020 census ===
As of the 2020 census, Broadway had a population of 4,170. The median age was 38.2 years. 25.8% of residents were under the age of 18 and 17.2% of residents were 65 years of age or older. For every 100 females there were 90.9 males, and for every 100 females age 18 and over there were 84.2 males age 18 and over.

99.6% of residents lived in urban areas, while 0.4% lived in rural areas.

There were 1,661 households in Broadway, of which 35.6% had children under the age of 18 living in them. Of all households, 50.2% were married-couple households, 13.9% were households with a male householder and no spouse or partner present, and 29.6% were households with a female householder and no spouse or partner present. About 28.1% of all households were made up of individuals and 13.0% had someone living alone who was 65 years of age or older.

There were 1,736 housing units, of which 4.3% were vacant. The homeowner vacancy rate was 1.9% and the rental vacancy rate was 1.8%.

Racial composition as of the 2020 census
Race	Number	Percent
White	3,592	86.1%
Black or African American	66	1.6%
American Indian and Alaska Native	13	0.3%
Asian	35	0.8%
Native Hawaiian and Other Pacific Islander	0	0.0%
Some other race	211	5.1%
Two or more races	253	6.1%
Hispanic or Latino (of any race)	405	9.7%

=== 2000 census ===
At the 2000 census there were 2,192 people, 882 households, and 610 families in the town. The population density was 1,202.5 people per square mile (465.0/km^{2}). There were 976 housing units at an average density of 535.4 per square mile (207.1/km^{2}). The racial makeup of the town was 97.22% White, 0.64% African American, 0.23% Native American, 0.68% Asian, 0.59% from other races, and 0.64% from two or more races. Hispanic or Latino of any race were 3.06%.

Of the 882 households 31.6% had children under the age of 18 living with them, 54.6% were married couples living together, 9.9% had a female householder with no husband present, and 30.8% were non-families. 25.9% of households were one person and 9.9% were one person aged 65 or older. The average household size was 2.42 and the average family size was 2.91.

The age distribution was 24.0% under the age of 18, 8.8% from 18 to 24, 30.4% from 25 to 44, 22.6% from 45 to 64, and 14.2% 65 or older. The median age was 37 years. For every 100 females there were 90.1 males. For every 100 females age 18 and over, there were 89.1 males.

The median household income was $40,167 and the median family income was $45,066. Males had a median income of $27,181 versus $20,930 for females. The per capita income for the town was $18,274. About 5.1% of families and 8.2% of the population were below the poverty line, including 10.7% of those under age 18 and 11.9% of those age 65 or over.

== Notable places ==
Bethlehem Church, Lincoln Homestead and Cemetery, Linville Creek Bridge, Sites House, and Tunker House are listed on the National Register of Historic Places.

== Notable people ==
- Vakhtang Jordania, Georgian defector and composer who resided in Broadway until his death in 2005

== Athletics ==
- The town is home to the Broadway Bruins, a baseball team in the Rockingham County Baseball League. The Bruins play home games at Broadway High School's baseball field.
- The 2014 Broadway High School girls' basketball team lost to cross-county rival Spotswood High School 56–49 in the Class 3A state finals.
- The 2017 Broadway High School girls' basketball team won the 2017 Class 3a state championship, 51–41, over Magna Vista High School.
