= Lost River State Park =

State park in Hardy County, West Virginia

- IUCN category III (natural monument or feature)
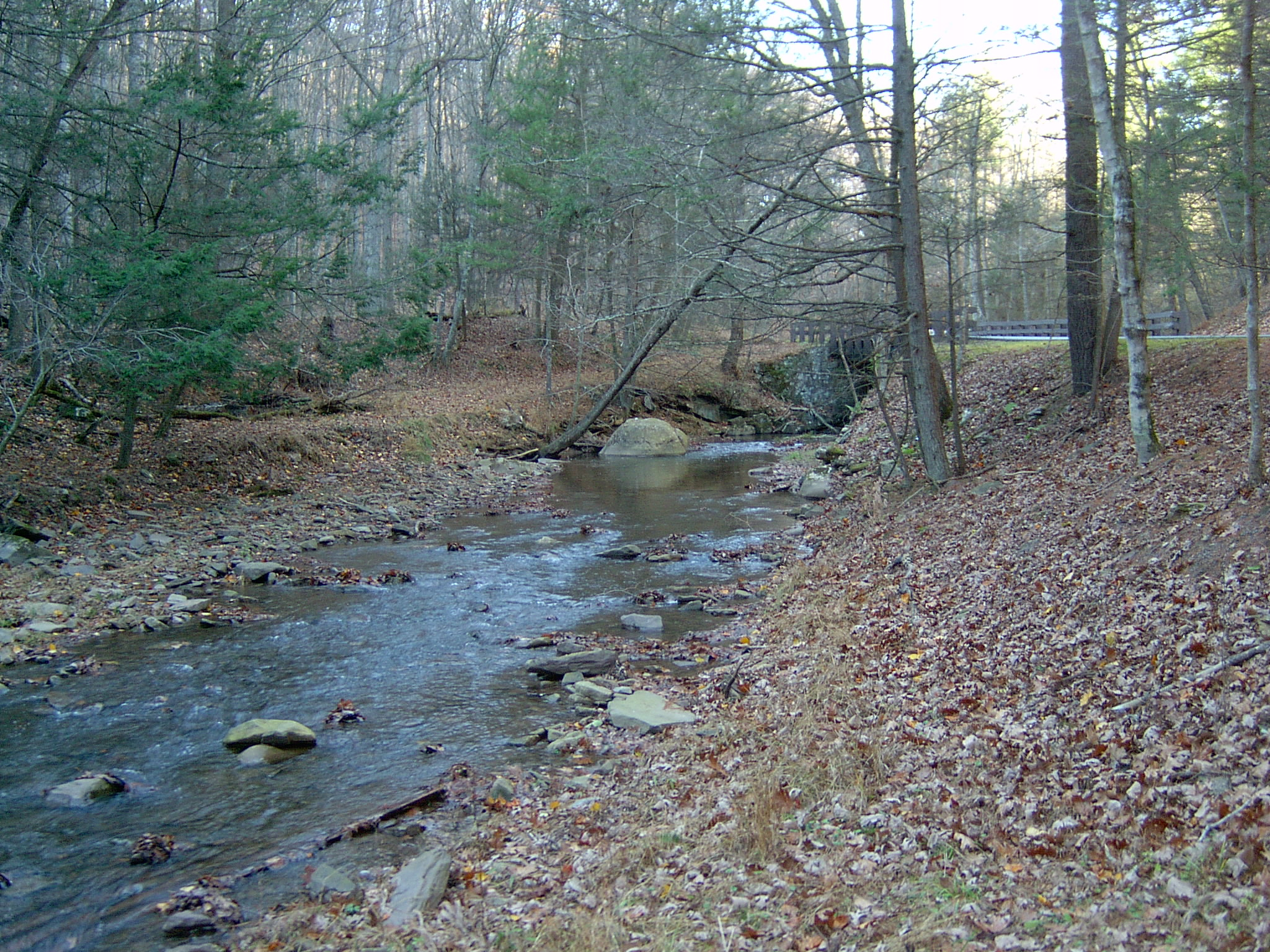
- Lost River State Park

- Location within West Virginia
- Location: Hardy County, West Virginia, West Virginia, United States
- Nearest town: Mathias, West Virginia
- Coordinates: 38°53′47″N 78°54′47″W
- Area: 3,712 acres (15.02 km^{2})
- Elevation: 2,037 ft (621 m)
- Established: 1934
- Named for: Lost River
- Governing body: West Virginia Division of Natural Resources
- Website: wvstateparks.com/park/lost-river-state-park/

Lost River State Park is a state park located in Hardy County, West Virginia near the community of Mathias. The park encompasses 3,712 acres (15.02 km^{2}) managed by the West Virginia Division of Natural Resources. Despite the name of the park, it does not abut the Lost River; it lies about 2.3 miles (3.7 km) west of the river.

The park features a selection of twenty-six vacation cabins. It also provides hiking trails, horses, a swimming pool, and other sports facilities that include tennis, badminton, volleyball, and archery. Lost River State Park includes the historic Lighthorse Harry Lee Cabin (c. 1800), which is listed on the National Register of Historic Places. Park structures built by the Civilian Conservation Corps are also listed on the National Register of Historic Places.

The park is located near the site of the 1756 Battle of the Trough, a skirmish between Virginia militia and a band of French and Indian warriors, during the French and Indian War.

== History ==
After the Revolutionary War, a portion of the parkland was awarded to Henry Lee III for his services during the war. Lee built a summer house on the land. The land was called Lee Sulphur Springs at the time. Lee's house still stands, now called the Lee Cabin Museum.

In February 1934, Governor Herman G. Kump recommended that the West Virginia Legislature appropriate sufficient funds in order to buy the land in order to turn it into a state park.

Lost River State Park was developed by the Civilian Conservation Corps under the technical supervision of the National Park Service in cooperation with the West Virginia State Conservation Commission.

== See also ==
- List of West Virginia state parks
