= High View, West Virginia =

- Unincorporated community
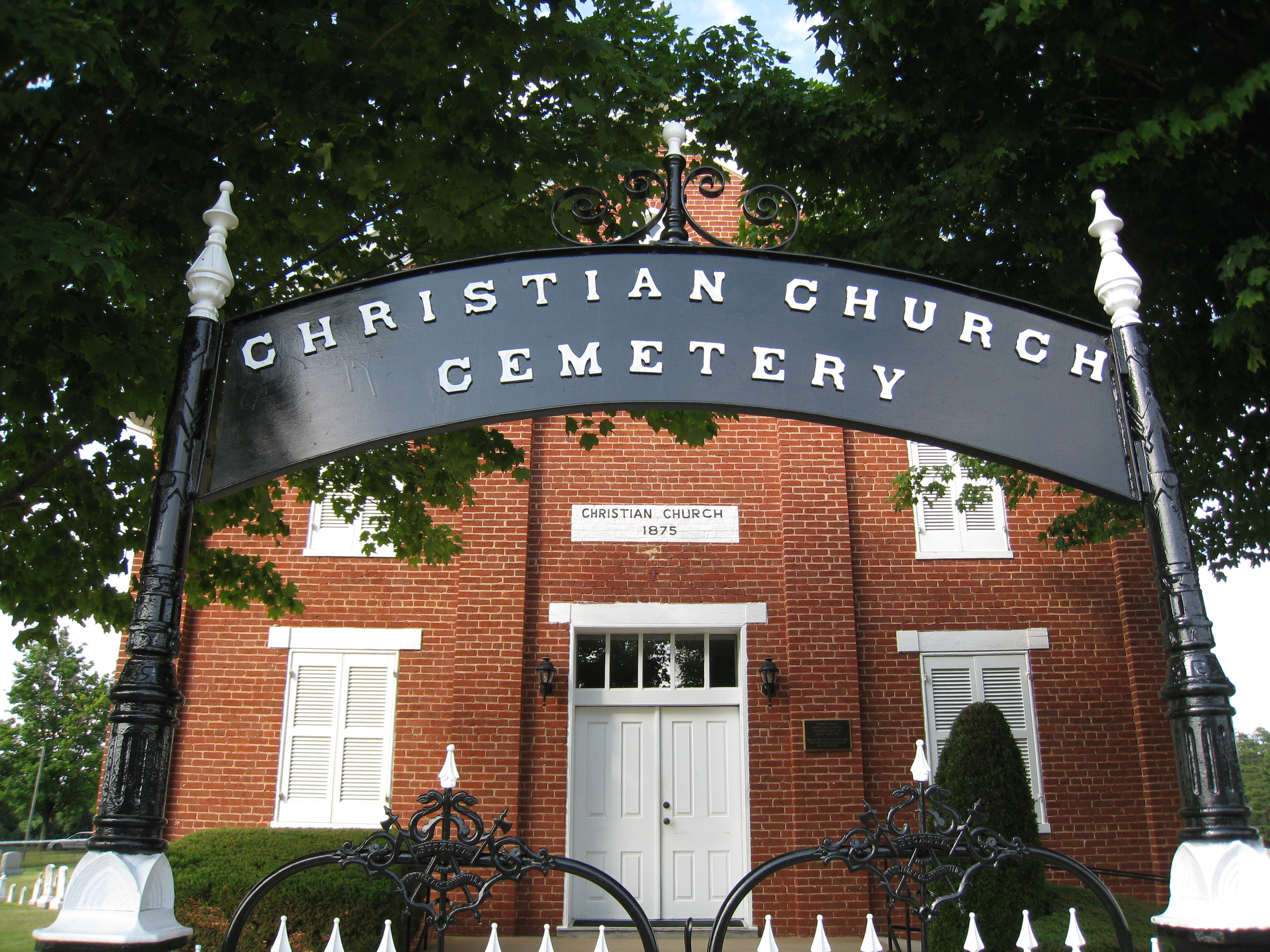
- Time Ridge Christian Church (1875)

- Location within West Virginia Location within the United States
- Coordinates: 39°13′50″N 78°24′30″W
- Country: United States
- State: West Virginia
- County: Hampshire
- Elevation: 1,270 ft (387 m)
- Time zone: UTC-5 (Eastern (EST))
  - Summer (DST): UTC-4 (EDT)
- ZIP code: 26808
- Area code: 304
- GNIS feature ID: 1554710

High View is an unincorporated community in Hampshire County, West Virginia, United States. It is located south of Capon Bridge along West Virginia Route 259 on the Virginia line. High View is home to the Bhavana Society Forest Monastery and Retreat Center. According to the 2000 census, the High View community has a population of 791.

== Historic sites ==
- Timber Ridge Christian Church (1875), WV 259
- Timber Ridge Camping Reservation (1955), WV 259
