= Baker, West Virginia =

Unincorporated community in West Virginia, United States

- Unincorporated community
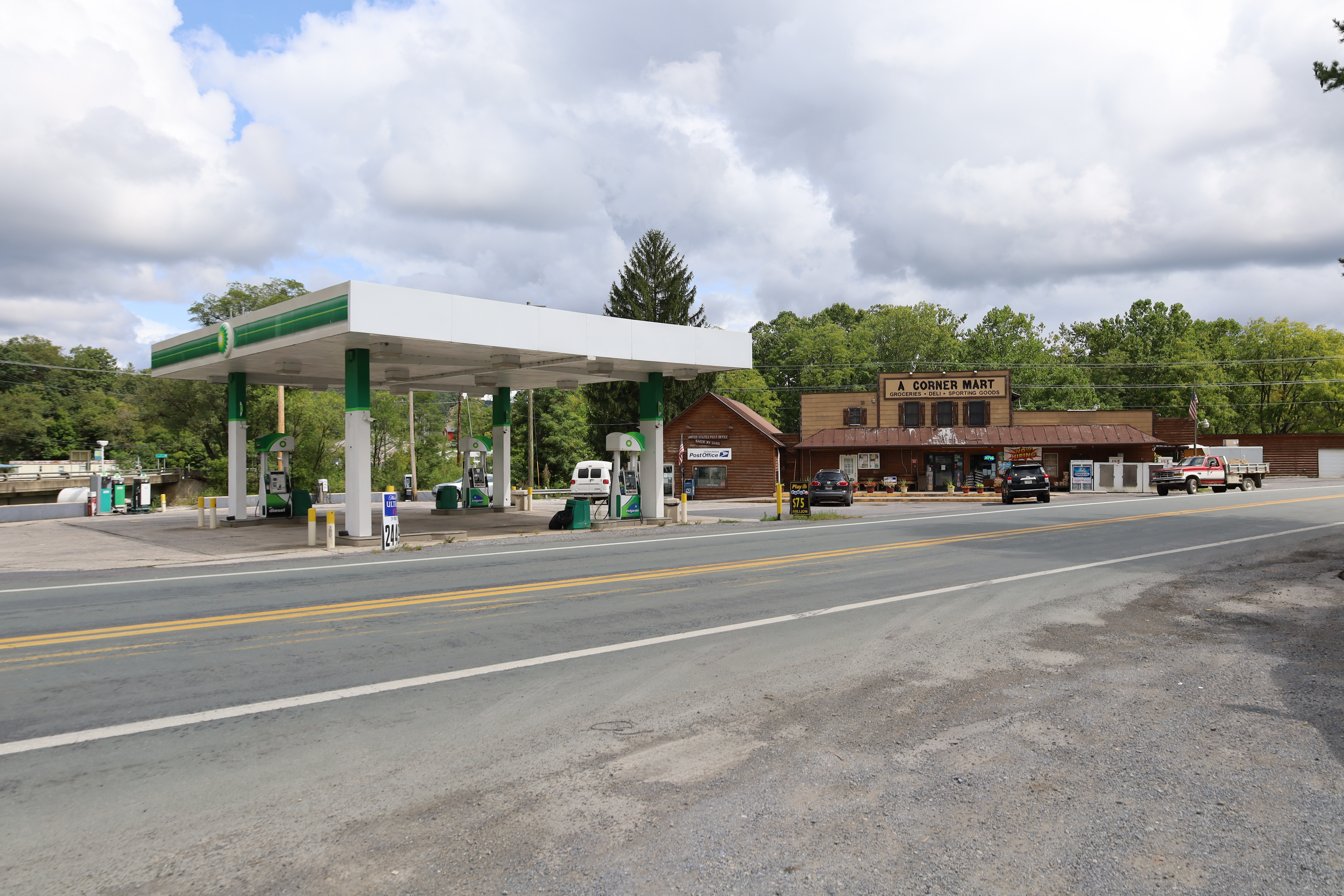
- Baker West Virginia Post Office

- Location within West Virginia Location within the United States
- Coordinates: 39°2′30″N 78°44′41″W
- Country: United States
- State: West Virginia
- County: Hardy

Population (2000)
  - Total: 1,262
- Time zone: UTC-5 (Eastern (EST))
  - Summer (DST): UTC-4 (EDT)
- ZIP codes: 26801
- GNIS feature ID: 1553778

Baker is an unincorporated community on the Lost River in Hardy County, West Virginia, United States. Baker is located at the intersection of U.S. Route 48, West Virginia Route 55, West Virginia Route 29 and West Virginia Route 259. The ZCTA population for Baker's ZIP Code was 1,262 at the 2000 census, though the zip code covers a much larger area than the actual community.

The community has the name of the local Baker family.

== See also ==
- Short Mountain Wildlife Management Area
