= Storm (disambiguation) =

A storm is a severe weather condition.

Storm(s) or The Storm may also refer to:

== Places ==
- Storm Bay, Tasmania, Australia
- Storm Cone, British Columbia, Canada
- Storm Mountain (disambiguation)
- Storm Peak, Ross Dependency, Antarctica
- Storms, Ohio, a community in the US
- Storms River, South Africa
- Minor planet 12182 Storm

== People ==
- Storm (given name)
- Storm (surname)
- Storms (surname)
- Storm Davis (born 1961), American retired Major League Baseball pitcher
- Storm (rapper) or Donna Harkness, member of American hip hop group Outlawz

== Arts and entertainment ==
=== Fictional characters ===
- Storm (comics), several comic book characters
- Storm (Marvel Comics), a Marvel Comics superhero
- Storm the Albatross, in the Sonic the Hedgehog franchise video games and comics
- Storm 2, a fighting robot that competed in Robot Wars
- Serge A. Storms, the main character in most of Tim Dorsey's novels

=== Films ===
- Storms (film), a 1953 French-Italian film starring Jean Gabin
- Storm (1954 film), a French-Italian drama
- Storm (1987 film), starring Stan Kane
- Storm (1999 film), starring Luke Perry and Martin Sheen
- Storm, a 2002 documentary on snow-skiing by Warren Miller
- Storm (2005 film), a Swedish fantasy-thriller
- Storm (2009 film), a political thriller by Hans-Christian Schmid
- The Final Storm (film) (2009), directed by Uwe Boll with the working title The Storm
- The Storm (1916 film), a silent film starring Blanche Sweet
- The Storm (1922 film), a silent northwoods melodrama
- The Storm (1930 film), starring Lupe Velez
- The Storm (1933 film), a Soviet film
- The Storm (1938 film), an American action film
- The Storm (2009 film), a Dutch film about the North Sea flood of 1953

=== Games ===
- Storm (2013 video game), a puzzle platform game developed by indiePub
- Storm: Frontline Nation, a 2011 turn-based strategy video game
- Storm, an upcoming video game developed by Overkill Software

=== Literature ===
- Storm (Angler novel), 2013, by Evan Angler
- Storm (Stewart novel), 1941, by George Rippey Stewart
- Storm (novella), a 1985 children's book by Kevin Crossley-Holland
- The Storm (Buechner novel), 1998, by Frederick Buechner
- The Storm (Cussler and Brown novel), a 2012 mystery novel by Clive Cussler and Graham Brown
- The Storm (Daniel Defoe), a 1704 account of a hurricane in Britain
- "The Storm" (short story), by Kate Chopin
- "The Storm" (Utterson short story), by Sarah Elizabeth Utterson
- The Storm (Ostrovsky), sometimes translated as The Thunderstorm, a drama in five acts
- The Storm (Strindberg), one of Strindberg's chamber plays
- "Storm", a pro-science beat poem by Tim Minchin

=== Music ===
==== Groups ====
- Storm (British band), a duo featuring James McNally and Tom McManamon
- Storm (German band), a late-1990s Trance duo
- Storm (Norwegian band), an early-1990s metal band
- The Storm (American band), a 1990s rock band
- The Storm (Danish band), a pop/rock band

==== Albums ====
- Storm (Assemblage 23 album) (2004)
- Storm (Heather Nova album) (2003)
- Storm (Skazi album) (2002)
- Storm (Theatre of Tragedy album) (2006)
- Storm (Vanessa-Mae album) (1998)
- Storms (Nanci Griffith album) (1988)
- Storms (Hedley album) (2011)
- Celtic Thunder: Storm, a 2011 album
- Da Storm, a 1996 album by O.G.C.
- The Storm (Karnataka album) (2000)
- The Storm (Moving Hearts album) (1985)
- The Storm (Travis Tritt album) (2007)
- The Storm (Tech N9ne album) (2016)
- The Storm (ZZ Ward album) (2017)
- The Storm, a reggae album from 1994 with The Gladiators

==== Songs ====
- "Storm" (Lenny Kravitz song), 2004
- "Storm" (Luna Sea song), 1998
- "Storm" (Theatre of Tragedy song), 2006
- "Storm" (SuRie song), 2018
- "Storm" (Victor Crone song), 2019
- "Storms" (Fleetwood Mac song), 1979
- "Running Through the Fire (Storm)", originally called "Storm", a 2010 single by Anika Moa
- "Storm" (Gener8ion song), 2026
- "Everything We Need", originally called "The Storm", a 2019 song by Kanye West
- "Storm", a song by Django Django from Django Django, 2012
- "Storm", a track by Dave Clarke from the Red Three ep, 1995
- "Storm", a track by Storm, 2000
- "Storm", a song by Godspeed You! Black Emperor from Lift Your Skinny Fists Like Antennas to Heaven, 2000
- "Storm", a song by Lifehouse from Who We Are, 2007
- "Storm", a song by Saliva from Back into Your System, 2002
- "The Storm" (Notaker song), 2018
- "The Storm", a song by Alestorm from The Thunderfist Chronicles, 2025
- "The Storm", a song by Big Country from The Crossing, 1983
- "The Storm", a song by Blackmore's Night from Fires at Midnight, 2001
- "The Storm", a song by Fat Mattress from Fat Mattress II, 1970
- "The Storm", a 1967 single by Jim Reeves
- "The Storm", a song by Kitt Wakeley featuring Starr Parodi from An Adoption Story, 2022
- "The Storm", a song by Poco from Inamorata, 1984
- "The Storm (Outro)", a song by Tinashe from Aquarius, 2014
- "The Storm", a story track from 1993 album Stories and Songs: The Adventures of Captain Feathersword the Friendly Pirate by The Wiggles

==== Other compositions ====
- The Storm (Tchaikovsky), an overture

=== Television ===
- The Storm (miniseries), a 2009 science fiction miniseries
- "The Storm", an episode of The Wind in the Willows, 1985
- "Storm" (Law & Order: Special Victims Unit), 2005
- "The Storm" (The Amazing World of Gumball), 2013
- "The Storm" (Avatar: The Last Airbender episode), 2005
- "The Storm" (Modern Family), 2016
- "The Storm" (Stargate Atlantis), 2004
- "The Storm" (The Walking Dead), 2019

=== Other uses in arts and entertainment ===
- A Storm, a 1922 painting by Georgia O'Keeffe
- The Storm (Cot), an 1880 painting by Pierre Auguste Cot
- The Storm (Fragonard) (also known as The Stalled Cart or Wagon in the Mud), a 1759 painting by Jean-Honoré Fragonard
- Storm (Don Lawrence), a comic book series

== Brands and enterprises ==
- Storm (ice cream), a dessert sold at Hungry Jack's fast food restaurants
- Storm (soft drink), made by PepsiCo
- Beretta Cx4 Storm, a pistol-carbine gun
- BlackBerry Storm, a smartphone
- Storm Aircraft, an Italian manufacturer
- Storm Financial, a defunct Australian company
- Storm Management, a British model agency
- The Storm (radio station), UK
- Storm Products, American manufacturer of bowling equipment
- Storm Books, American publisher

== Computing and science ==
- Storm (software), an SQL object-relational mapper
- Apache Storm, a distributed realtime computing system
- Stochastic optical reconstruction microscopy, or STORM, a light imaging technique
- Storm botnet

== Land vehicles ==
- AIL Storm, an off-road vehicle used by Israeli security forces
- Geo Storm, a sport compact car
- Lister Storm, a British racing car first manufactured in 1993
- San Storm, an Indian sports car manufactured
- Storms (automobile), an electric cycle-car

== Military ==
- HMS Storm (P233), a Royal Navy Second World War submarine
- HNoMS Storm, any of various Royal Norwegian Navy torpedo and patrol boats
- Operation Storm, a Croatian military operation
- Storm-class patrol boat, formerly built for the Royal Norwegian Navy

== Sports teams ==
=== Australia ===
- Melbourne Storm, an Australian rugby league team
- Sydney Storm (1992–1999), a defunct Australian Baseball League team, originally the Sydney Blues

=== Canada ===
==== Hockey ====
- Campbell River Storm, a junior "B" ice hockey team in British Columbia
- Deseronto Storm, a junior ice hockey team in Ontario
- Grande Prairie Storm, a junior ice hockey team in Alberta
- Guelph Storm, a major junior ice hockey team in Ontario
- Kamloops Storm, a junior ice hockey team in British Columbia
- Simcoe Storm, a Canadian junior ice hockey team

==== Other sports ====
- Durham Storm (1998–2005), a defunct soccer team in Ontario
- Island Storm, a basketball team in Prince Edward Island

=== Germany ===
- Karlsruhe Storm, a German lacrosse team

=== Norway ===
- Bergen Storm, an American football team in Norway
- Storms BK, a Norwegian association football club

=== United Kingdom ===
- Derby Storm (1984–2002), a former British Basketball League team
- Manchester Storm (1995–2002), a British former ice hockey team
- Manchester Storm (2015–), a British ice hockey team
- Western Storm, a women's cricket team based in South West England

=== United States ===
==== American football ====
- Portland Storm (1973–1975), a defunct World Football League team
- Sioux Falls Storm, an indoor football team
- Tampa Bay Storm, an arena football team

==== Baseball and softball ====
- Lake Elsinore Storm, a minor league baseball team
- Chicago Storm (softball), a professional softball team, 1977–78

==== Basketball ====
- Oklahoma Storm (1990–2007), a defunct United States Basketball League team
- Seattle Storm, a WNBA basketball team

==== Hockey ====
- Toledo Storm (1991–2007), a defunct minor league ice hockey team
- Tri-City Storm, a Tier 1 junior ice hockey team

==== Lacrosse ====
- Anaheim Storm (2004–2005), a defunct National Lacrosse League team
- New Jersey Storm (2002–2003), a defunct National Lacrosse League team

==== Soccer ====
- Boston Storm (soccer) (1994–1995), a defunct USISL team
- Buffalo Storm (1984), a defunct USL soccer team
- California Storm, a women's soccer team, originally the Sacramento Storm (1995)
- Memphis Storm (1986–1994), a defunct AISA and USISL soccer team
- New Orleans Storm (1993–1999), a defunct USISL soccer team, originally named the New Orleans Riverboat Gamblers
- Seattle Storm (soccer) (1984–1995), a defunct soccer team
- St. Louis Storm (1989–1992), a defunct Major Indoor Soccer League team

==== Schools ====
- The Storm, the athletics teams of Simpson College, Indianola, Iowa
- Storm, the athletics teams of Celebration High School in Celebration, Florida
- Storm, the athletics teams of Crown College, St. Bonifacius, Minnesota
- Storm, the athletics teams of Keuka College, Keuka Park, New York
- Lake Erie Storm, the athletics teams of Lake Erie College, Painesville, Ohio

== Other uses ==
- Save the Oak Ridges Moraine (STORM), a Canadian environmental organization
- The Storm (conspiracy theory), put forward by QAnon

== See also ==
- Storme, a list of people with the given name or surname
- Tata Safari Storme, a model of the Tata Safari SUV
- USS Stormes, a destroyer launched during World War II
- Shtorm (disambiguation)
