= Mount Storm =

Mount Storm may refer to:

- Mount Storm, West Virginia, an unincorporated community in Grant County
- Mount Storm Lake, a reservoir in Grant County, West Virginia
- Mount Storm Park, a City of Cincinnati municipal park
- Mount Storm Power Station, on the west bank of Mount Storm Lake

== See also ==
- Mount Storm King
- Storm Mountain (disambiguation)
