= Storm (given name) =

- Gender: Unisex
- Language: English

Origin
- Language: Germanic
- Origin: Storm (surname)
- Meaning: "storm"
- Region of origin: England, Germany, Netherlands, Scandinavia

Other names
- Related names: Stormie, Stormy, Storme, Stormer, Storms, Sturm

Storm is a unisex given name.

Notable people with the given name include:

== Men ==
- Storm Bull (engineer) (1856–1907), American politician from Wisconsin
- Storm De Beul (2001–2024), Belgian YouTuber and survival influencer
- Storm Duck (born 2000), American football player
- Storm Field (born 1948), American television meteorologist
- Storm Herseth (1897–1985), Norwegian chess player
- Storm Johnson (born 1992), American football player
- Storm Murphy (born 1999), American basketball player
- Storm Norton (born 1994), American football player
- Storm Roux (born 1993), South African-born New Zealand footballer
- Storm Saulter (born 1983), Jamaican filmmaker and photographer
- Storm Thorgerson (1944–2013), English graphic designer best known for album covers
- Storm Uru (born 1985), New Zealand rower
- Storm Warren (born 1988), American basketball player
- Storm Weinholdt (1920–1945), Norwegian World War II resistance member

== Women ==
- Storm Calysta, American pop musician, model, and director
- Storm Constantine (1956–2021), British science fiction and fantasy writer
- Storm de Hirsch (1912–2000), American poet and filmmaker
- Storm Hunter (born 1994), Australian tennis player
- Storm Huntley (born 1987), Scottish television presenter
- Storm Jameson (1891–1986), English journalist and author
- Storm Keating (born 1981), American television producer and director
- Storm Klomhaus (born 1998), American ski racer
- Storm Large (born 1969), American singer, songwriter, actress, and author
- Storm Purvis (born 1993), New Zealand netball player
- Storm Reid (born 2003), American actress

== See also ==
- Storm (disambiguation)
