= Mount Storm Power Station =

Coal-fired power station

Mount Storm Generating Station
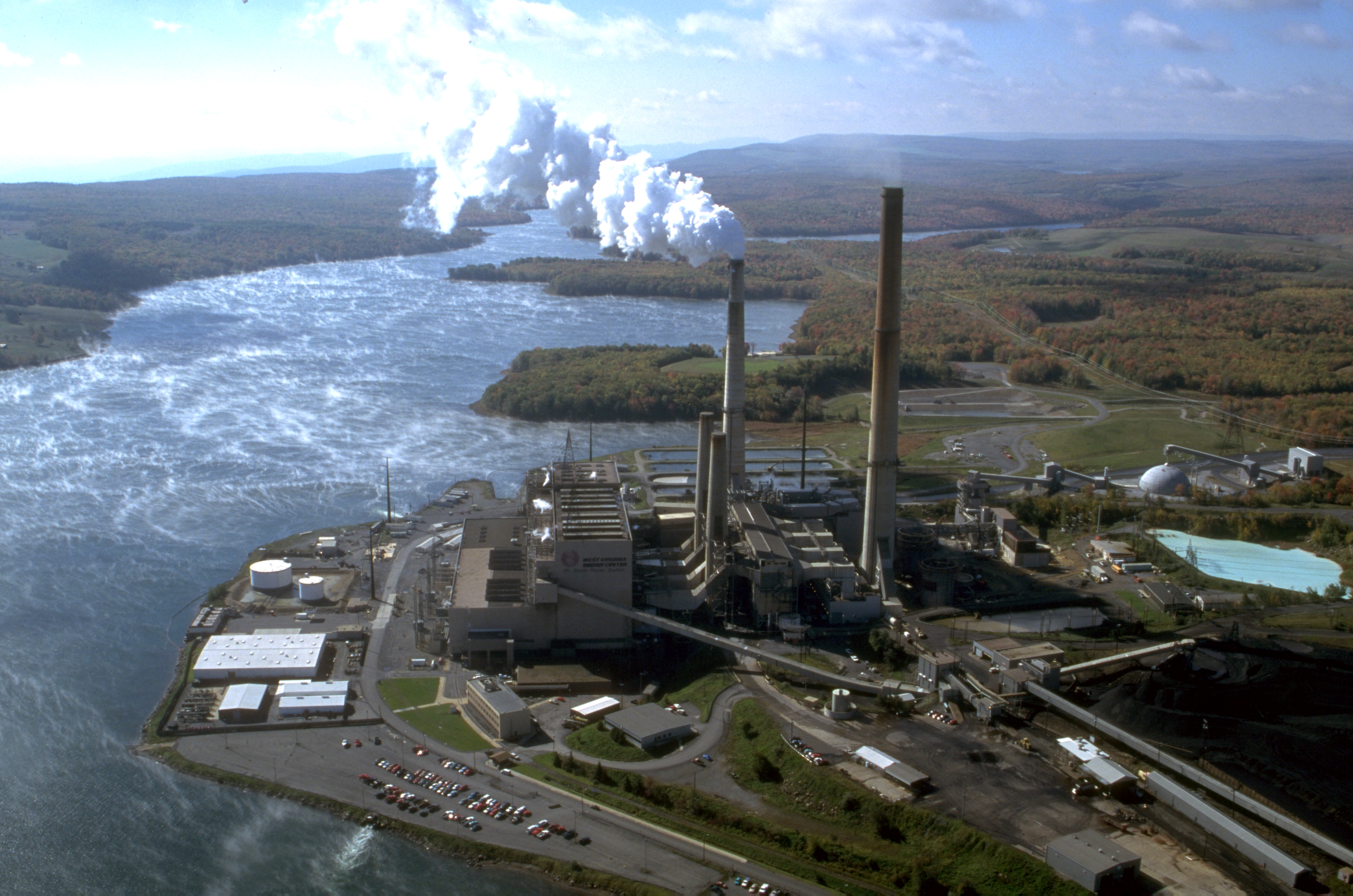
- Aerial view of the Mount Storm Generating Station and its artificial lake
- Country: United States
- Location: Grant County, near Bismarck, West Virginia
- Coordinates: 39°12′03″N 79°15′46″W
- Status: Operational
- Commission date: Unit 1: September, 1965; Unit 2: June, 1966; Unit 3: December, 1973
- Owner: Dominion

Thermal power station
- Primary fuel: Coal Synfuel
- Turbine technology: Steam turbine
- Cooling source: Mount Storm Lake

Power generation
- Nameplate capacity: 1,600 MWe

External links
- Commons: Related media on Commons

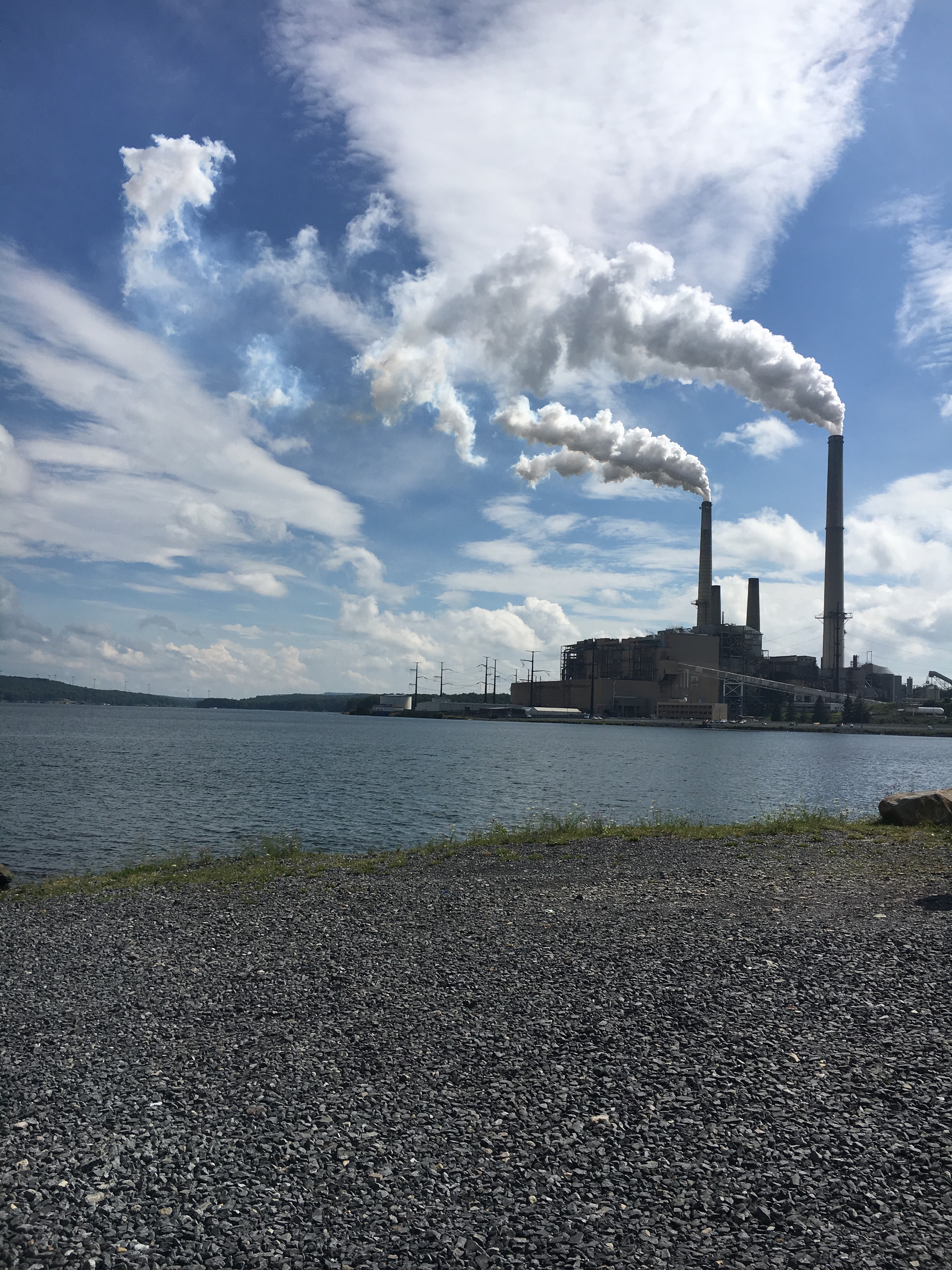
Mount Storm Power Station from the boat ramp overlooking the lake

The Mount Storm Generating Station, located on the west bank of Mount Storm Lake 2 miles (3 km) from Bismarck, West Virginia, United States, is a coal-fired power station owned by Dominion Resources. The facility's three units use around 15,000 tons of coal per day to generate more than 1,600 megawatts of electricity from the coal synfuel for around 2 million people in Northern Virginia.

== History ==
Mount Storm Power Station was engineered and built by Stone & Webster, an American engineering service company from Massachusetts. They built Mount Storm's first coal plant unit in September 1965, the second unit soon after in June 1966, and the third unit in December 1973. During the first few decades that the station existed, the hazard of fly ash was a big problem for the employees of Mount Storm Power Station as well as for the people living in the surrounding communities. These people were constantly exposed to the asbestos not even knowing of its existence. It was not till the 1970s where rules were passed to regulate the exposure of these toxicants. Due to the lack of regulation, people who worked in the power station prior to 1980 have been diagnosed with "asbestos-related illnesses, including asbestosis and the much more deadly mesothelioma." Since then Mount Storm Power Station has kept up with all government regulations and now catches most all of the toxicants produced by burning the coal before it can harm the employees or the surrounding community.

Mount Storm has scrubbers which use 700 tons of limestone per day which removes up to 95% of the sulfur dioxide emitted by the station. Dominion states that Mount Storm Power Station exceeds the regulations set by the West Virginia regulators.

== Mount Storm Lake ==
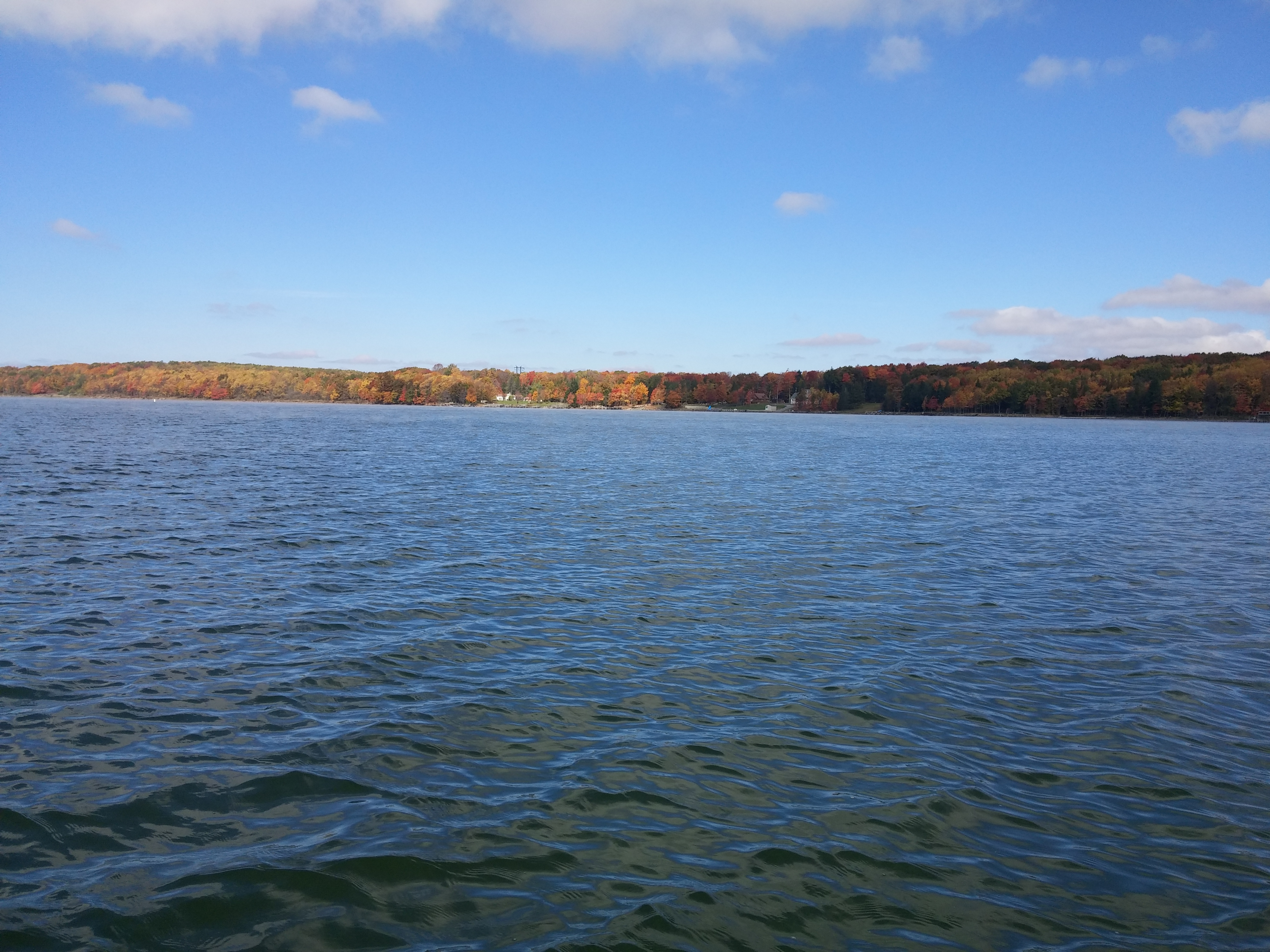
Mount Storm Lake

Mount Storm Lake is a reservoir created for Mount Storm Power Station along the Stony River. This lake is 1,200 acres and is used as a cooling pond for the power station. The power station sucks up approximately 234,000 gallons of water from the lake per minute to cool down the steam used to run the turbines. This results in the entire lake being sucked up and recycled in just 2.5 days. Due to this cooling process, Mount Storm Lake is warm all year around. "Even when winter temperatures are below freezing, the water temperature in the lake seldom drops below 60 degrees F. This makes the lake an attractive year-round destination for scuba divers, boaters and fishermen." However, some people are resistant to participate in these water activities due to the proximity to the coal-fired station.

Due to the year round cooling process, the warm water has an effect on the environment called Thermal Pollution. Thermal pollution is defined as "a rise in the temperature of rivers and lakes that is injurious to water-dwelling life, and is caused by the disposal of heated industrial waste water." One effect of thermal pollution is that it reduces the levels of Dissolved Oxygen in the water. The dissolved oxygen reduces the amount of oxygen in the water that plants and animals need to survive. Warm water also provokes the spread of algae in the water which can also reduce levels of oxygen. Another effect that thermal pollution has on the environment is it increases the metabolic rate of organisms. "Increasing enzyme activity occurs that causes organisms to consume more food than what is normally required... It disrupts the stability of the food chain and (can) alter the balance of species composition."

Dominion Resources maintains restrictions on activities permitted for visitors to the lake.

== Wind farm ==
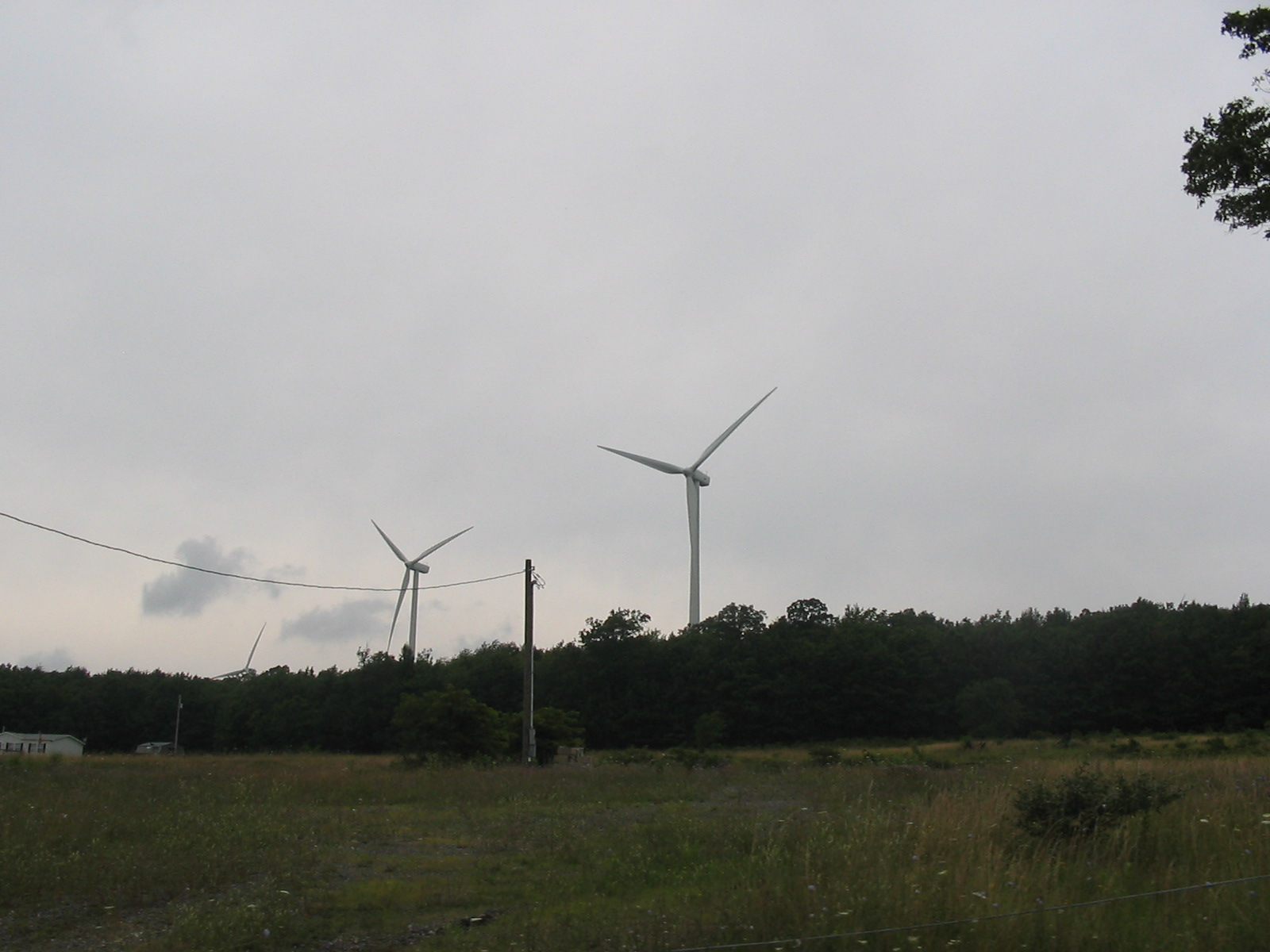
Two of Mount Storm's Windmill's along the Allegheny Front

Mount Storm also includes Ned power Mount Storm, LLC which is a nearby wind farm with 132 wind turbines. These wind turbines are placed along 12 miles of the Allegheny Front. The wind farm began construction in 2006 and is now currently fully operational. The wind generates up to 264MW of electricity which is enough to power 66,000 homes.

Generating units
Unit	Generating capacity (MWe)	Commissioned	Boiler manufacturer	Generator manufacturer	Engineer and builder
1	563	September 1965	Combustion Engineering	Westinghouse Electric	Stone & Webster
2	563	June 1966	Combustion Engineering	Westinghouse Electric	Stone & Webster
3	567	December 1973	Combustion Engineering	Asea Brown Boveri	Stone & Webster

== See also ==
- List of power stations
- Global warming
