= Yaowa Lake Park =

Park in Beijing, China

- Type: Urban park
- Location: Beijing, China
- Area: 36.5 hectares (90 acres)
- Created: 2006
- Status: Open all year

Yaowa Lake Park is a major public urban park in eastern Beijing. It is the only public comprehensive park in Nanmofang region of Beijing. The 4th Ring Road of Beijing cuts through the park and divides it into two halves. The Yaowa Lake is in the eastern half of the park. In Qing Dynasty, people grubbed mud in eastern Beijing to make bricks. Two big caves are created near today's Huagong Road. Then, rain water impounded in these two caves and made them two lakes. The northern lake later became the cooling pond of Beijing Thermal Power Plant, and the southern lake was named as Yaowa Lake (Chinese: 窑洼湖; lit. 'Kiln Cave Lake'), and later preserved to be the public park.
