= Storm (surname) =

Storm is an English, German, Dutch, and Scandinavian surname and may refer to:

- Avery Storm, stage name of American singer, Ralph di Stasio
- Bo Storm (born 1987), Danish footballer
- Byron Storm (1851–1933), American politician
- Dirck Storm (1630–1716), Dutch American colonist
- Don Storm (1932–2019), American politician
- Elizabeth Storm (born 1958), American actress
- Edvard Storm (1749–1794), Norwegian poet
- Emy Storm (1925–2014), Swedish actress
- Esben Storm (1950–2011), Danish-Australian actor, screenwriter, television producer and director
- František Štorm (born 1966), Czech font designer
- Frederic Storm (1844–1935), American politician from New York
- Frederik Storm (born 1989), Danish ice hockey player
- Gale Storm (1922–2009), American actress and singer
- Graeme Storm (born 1978), English golfer
- Gustav Storm (1845–1903), Norwegian historian
- Hannah Storm (born 1962), American television sports journalist
- Hans Otto Storm (1895–1941), German American writer, novelist and radio engineer
- Howard Storm (author) (born 1946), American author, best known for the book My Descent Into Death
- Howard Storm (director) (born 1939), American film, television director and actor
- James Storm (born 1977), ring name of American professional wrestler, James Allen Cox
- Jennifer Storm (born 1975), American author on alcohol and drug addiction and recovery
- Jerome Storm (1890–1958), American film director, actor and writer
- Johan Storm (1836–1920), Norwegian linguist
- Joanna Storm (born 1958), American pornographic actress
- John Brutzman Storm (1838–1901), American politician from Pennsylvania
- Jonny Storm (born 1977) ring name of English wrestler, Jonathan Whitcombe
- J.W. Storm, ring name of American wrestler, Jeff Warner
- Kees Storm (born 1942), Dutch businessman
- Kristoffer Hjort Storm (born 1989), Danish politician
- Lance Storm (born 1969), ring name of Canadian wrestler, Lance Evers
- Lauren Storm (born 1987), American actress
- Lesley Storm (1898–1975), pen-name of Scottish writer Mabel Cowie
- Michael Storm (born 1939), American actor
- Morten Storm (born 1976), Danish PET agent
- Nikola Storm (born 1994), Belgian footballer
- Olaf Storm (1894–1931), Danish silent film actor
- Peter Storm (born 1953), birth name of Swedish actor Peter Stormare
- Rebecca Storm (born 1958), stage name of British singer and actress, Eliazabeth Hewlett
- Rory Storm (1938–1972), English musician and vocalist
- Selina Storm (born 1987), German politician
- Tempest Storm (1928–2021), stage name of American exotic dancer and actress Annie Banks
- Theodor Storm (1817–1888), German writer
- Thomas Storm (1749–1833), American politician
- Tim Storm (born 1964), ring name of American wrestler, Timothy Scoggins
- Toni Storm (born 1995), ring name of New Zealand Australian wrestler, Toni Rossall
- Torben Storm (born 1946), Danish football player and coach
- Warren Storm (1937–2021), American drummer and vocalist
- William George Storm (1826–1892), Canadian architect

== Fictional ==
- Major Storm, a fictional character in the G.I. Joe universe
- Johnny Storm, or the Human Torch, a member of the Fantastic Four in Marvel Comics
- Sue Storm, or the Invisible Woman, a member of the Fantastic Four in Marvel Comics
- Tommy Storm, protagonist of the eponymous novel by A.J. Healy
- Jackson Storm, antagonist in Cars 3

== See also ==
- Storm (given name)
- Storms (surname)
- Storm (disambiguation)
