= Storm (comics) =

Storm, in comics, may refer to:

- Storm (Marvel Comics), a member of Marvel Comics' X-Men, also known as Ororo Munroe
- Storm (DC Comics), a giant seahorse and Aquaman's steed
- Storm (Don Lawrence), a Dutch science-fiction comic series and its protagonist
- Storm, a family in Marvel Comics, largely appearing in the Fantastic Four titles:
  - Susan Storm, also known as the Invisible Woman
  - Johnny Storm, also known as the Human Torch
  - Franklin Storm, their father
  - Mary Storm, their mother who died, but is a character in Ultimate Fantastic Four
- Storm the Albatross, a character in the Sonic the Hedgehog franchise video games and comics
- Storm Boy, a DC Comics character associated with the Legion of Super-Heroes
- Storm Curtis, a character who appeared in Prize Comics
- Captain William Storm, a DC Comics character who appeared in his own eponymous title Capt. Storm and was a member of the original Losers

== See also ==
- Storm (disambiguation)
- Stormbreaker: The Graphic Novel, the first of a series of graphic novels based on the book and film
- Stormfront, a character from The Boys
- Stormquest, a title from Caliber Comics
- Storm Shadow (G.I. Joe), a character from the G.I. Joe comics, who has his own eponymous series
- Stormwatch (comics), a Wildstorm title
- Stormwatcher, a comic from Eclipse Comics
