= A. J. Healy =

Irish author of children's books

Alan James Healy
- Born: Alan James Healy; Dublin, Ireland
- Occupation: Novelist
- Writing career
- Pen name: A. J. Healy
- Period: 2002—present
- Genres: Comedy, Fantasy
- Notable works: Tommy Storm, Tommy Storm and the Galactic Knights
- Website: www.tommystorm.com

Alan James "A. J." Healy is an Irish author of children's books. He has written two books, Tommy Storm and its sequel, Tommy Storm and the Galactic Knights. After a colourful childhood, and many jobs around the world, he settled back in Dublin, where he was born, to start writing books. In 2002, he finished Tommy Storm, but was unable to find a publisher due to his being generally unknown. Four years later, he self-published the book, making 5,000 copies. A few months later, when approximately 4,000 books were sold, Quercus bought the rights to publish it.

== Tommy Storm books ==
1. Tommy Storm. Penguin Group. 2007. ISBN 9781847244253.
2. Tommy Storm and the Galactic Knights. Quercus. 2010. ISBN 9781847247551.
