= Stormy =

Stormy may refer to:

== Entertainment ==
- Stormy (album), by Hank Williams, Jr.
- "Stormy" (song), a 1968 song by the Classics IV
- Stormy (1935 film), a drama starring Noah Beery Jr., also the title character played by Beery
- Stormy (2024 film), an American documentary film
- Stormy, a character from the children's TV show Rainbow Brite
- Derek "Stormy" Waters, a character in the American animated TV show Sealab 2021

== People ==
- Stormy Daniels (born 1979), American actress and director
- Stormy Kendrick (born 1991), American female sprinter
- Stormy Peters, free and open source software advocate
- Leon Stormy Rottman (1918–1993), American weather forecaster and TV host
- nickname of Roy Weatherly (1915–1991), American Major League Baseball player
- Stormy (rapper) (born 1997), Moroccan rapper and songwriter

== Other uses ==
- Stormy Lake (disambiguation), several lakes
- Stormy, mascot of Lake Erie College, Painesville, Ohio, United States
- Stormy, mascot of the National Hockey League Carolina Hurricanes

== See also ==
- Stormie, a given name
- Storm, a weather phenomenon
