= Shtorm =

Shtorm (Russian: Шторм, romanized: Shtorm, lit. 'Storm') may refer to:

== Ships ==
- Shtorm (aircraft carrier), the Project 23000E (Russian: Шторм, lit. 'Storm'), a proposed future Russian aircraft carrier
- Project 206 Shtorm (Russian: Шторм, lit. 'Storm'), a Soviet torpedo boat class, known under the NATO reporting name Shershen-class torpedo boat
  - Project 206M Shtorm-M (Russian: Шторм, lit. 'Storm'), a Soviet torpedo boat class, known under the NATO reporting name Turya-class torpedo boat
- Soviet guard ship Shtorm (Russian: Шторм, lit. 'Storm'), a Uragan-class guard ship
- Soviet trawler Shtorm (Russian: Шторм, lit. 'Storm'), a fishing vessel
- Bulgarian minesweeper Shtorm (pennant 61; Bulgarian: Щорм, romanized: Shtorm, lit. 'sea storm') of the Bulgarian Navy

== Aerospace ==
- M-11 Shtorm (NATO reporting name: SA-N-3 Goblet; Russian: Шторм, lit. 'Storm'), a Russian surface-to-air missile
- Yakovlev Yak-40 Shtorm, a military variant of the Yakovlev Yak-40 regional jet

== Arts, entertainment, media ==
- Echelon (2001 video game), originally known as "Шторм" (Russian: Shtorm, lit. 'Storm'), a Russian sci-fi flight sim
- Shtorm (song, Russian: Шторм, lit. 'Storm'), 2018 song by Arkona off the album Khram (album)

== Groups, organizations, companies ==
- Shtorm Battalion (Ukrainian: Шторм, lit. 'Storm'), a police battalion of the Special Police Forces (Ukraine)
- Research Institute Shtorm, a Ukrainian Defense Industry research institute in Odesa
- Shtorm Odesa (Ukrainian: Шторм, lit. 'Storm'), a soccer team based in Odesa, Ukraine; which participated in the 1975 KFK competitions (Ukraine)

== Other uses ==
- Viktor Shtorm, a Kazakh who competed for Kazakhstan in boxing at the 1994 Asian Games

== See also ==
- The dictionary definition of шторм at Wiktionary
- Operation Shtorm-333 (27 December 1979; Russian: Шторм-333, romanized: Štorm-333); the Soviet military operation behind the Tajbeg Palace assault
- Storm-Z (Russian: Шторм-Z, romanized: Shtorm-Z, lit. 'Storm-Z'), Russian penal military units in the 2022 Russian invasion of Ukraine
- Storm (disambiguation)
