= Sneak (novel) =

2012 apocalyptic novel by Evan Angler

Swipe
- Author: Evan Angler
- Language: English
- Series: Swipe series
- Genre: Young adult novel
- Published: 2012 (Thomas Nelson)
- Publication place: United States
- Media type: Print (Paperback)
- Pages: 288 pp
- ISBN: 9781400318360
- OCLC: 779873363
- Preceded by: Swipe
- Followed by: Storm

Sneak is an apocalyptic fiction novel written by Evan Angler and published in 2012. The second book in the Swipe series, it is aimed at a middle grade audience.

== Plot ==
13-year-old Logan Langly is wanted by DOME (the Department of Marked Emergencies) for escaping after he flunked his citizenship Pledge. After spending a month running from DOME and hiding in the woods, he finds that the political situation in his section of the American Union, formerly the United States, has worsened quickly. Not only is the country now a part of the Global Union, but DOME is cracking down on the Unmarked—those who have refused to Pledge—and arresting them for any crime, however minor. Those arrested are never heard from again. And Logan, it appears, is the source of the problem. As the only Unmarked person to have escaped a Pledge, his very existence is both an embarrassment and a threat to the government, which is determined to hunt him down. Even the Unmarked are divided in their attitudes toward Logan. Some of them respect him for taking action against DOME, but others resent the trouble he has caused.

Logan wants to avoid arrest for more than one reason. His sister Lily disappeared after her Pledge five years earlier, and Logan believes she is being held in a prison called Acheron in Beacon City, the capital of the American Union. He is determined to rescue her, no matter the cost. Lily's old friend Daniel Peck wants to aid in the rescue, but his friends, the Dust, are not so keen on the idea. Logan's actions in Swipe cost them their home—twice—and they object to the risk of getting involved with him again, especially since Logan's plan will require, at the very least, a dangerous cross-country trip.

Meanwhile, Erin Arbitor discovers that all her efforts to help catch Peck and reform Logan have failed to save her father's job. She had envisioned a happy family reunion in Beacon City, but now her parents' marriage seems even worse, and Logan seems to be gone forever. Erin has one hope left. She knows that Logan wants to find his sister in Beacon City. If Erin can find Lily, then Logan should not be far behind. But Erin's hacking investigation turns up some information that she did not expect—information that could, if ignored, jeopardize Logan and Peck's rescue mission. Erin's past betrayals make it difficult for Logan and Peck to trust her again. But, in the end, Erin is the only one who understands the true nature of Acheron.

== Characters ==
- Logan Langly: A thirteen-year-old fugitive. Normally quiet, Logan unintentionally becomes the leader of a Markless protest.
- Erin Arbitor: The thirteen-year-old daughter of a disgraced government agent. Erin is a talented computer hacker, and she uses her skills to help Logan, who she considers her best friend.
- Daniel Peck: A seventeen-year-old fugitive. The leader of a group called the Dust, Peck has become notorious for his well-intentioned kidnappings of at-risk twelve-year-olds.
- Hailey Phoenix: Twelve years old, Hailey has spent the last year or so helping Peck spy on Logan and Dane, her former best friends. Despite Logan's mistakes in Swipe, Hailey is determined to join him in his quest to rescue Lily.
- Blake: A fourteen-year-old runaway. Blake has been Peck's best friend, but he disagrees with Peck over the wisdom of helping Logan again.
- Joanne: A fifteen-year-old member of the Dust. Left alone when her Markless parents were arrested, Jo became friends with Peck and helped him form the Dust.
- Eddie: A thirteen-year-old member of the Dust. Eddie, an infamous troublemaker, was originally kidnapped by Peck in order to save him from flunking his Pledge.
- Tyler: Also thirteen and a member of the Dust, Tyler is Eddie's best friend. He grew up among the Markless and was eventually embraced by the Dust.
- Meg Stewart: An autistic girl with a talent for knocking out intruders. Meg was kidnapped by Peck just before her Pledge.
- Dane Howard: A thirteen-year-old musician. Dane came from a rich family, but he never fit in, and Peck kidnapped him before he could undergo the Marking process. Dane is an old friend of Logan's.
- Rusty: A six-year-old orphan, Rusty is the youngest member of the Dust. Blake rescued him from a DOME raid in Swipe.
- Sonya Langly: Logan's grandmother, the only person in his family to take his side in opposing the government.
- Diane Phoenix: Hailey's mother. She partners with Logan's grandmother to find an illegal radio station in an effort to keep contact with Logan and Hailey.
- Lily Langly: Logan's eighteen-year-old sister. Lily disappeared after her Marking five years earlier.

== Major themes ==
Sneak is set during the Tribulation. Unlike Swipe, the first book in the series, Sneak includes some Christian characters who briefly clarify the prophetic time frame under which the series takes place. The conception of the Tribulation is written according to a loose interpretation of the premillennial, pretribulational viewpoint.

== Publication history ==
Sneak was released on September 4, 2012 as a paperback. Sneak's publisher, Thomas Nelson, simultaneously issued the novel in an eBook format. Author Lis Wiehl reviewed the series, calling it “Apocalyptic dystopian fiction at its best. Angler’s sharp wit and dexterity with political themes are matched only by the thrilling suspense on every page.” The School Library Journal review of the book states, "Sneak is a page-turner. Angler keeps the story moving at a quick pace, emphasizing the teens' trials and tribulations, but it is difficult to follow without having read the first in the series. The large cast of characters seems excessive, and their lack of defined personalities makes them tricky to remember. The story's Christian elements are potentially too marginalized for readers seeking Christian fiction and a little out of place for those looking for dystopian fiction."

Barrie Buckner narrates the audiobook version of Sneak, which was released by Oasis Audio in October 2012. Available in both CD and MP3 formats, the audiobook is eight hours and twenty-five minutes long.
