= Storme =

Storme is a given name and a surname. It may refer to:

== Given name ==
- Stormé DeLarverie (1920–2014), American gay civil rights icon and entertainer whose scuffle with police may have sparked the Stonewall riots
- Storme Toolis (born 1992), British disabled actress
- Storme Warren, 21st century American television and radio broadcaster
- Storme Webber (born 1959), American artist, poet, curator and educator

== Surname ==
- James Storme (1943–2026), Belgian footballer and later manager
- Lucien Storme (1916–1945), Belgian professional road bicycle racer
- Marcel Storme (1930–2018), Belgian lawyer and politician
- Matthias Storme (born 1959), Belgian lawyer, academic and conservative philosopher
- Roland Storme (1934–2022), Belgian footballer

== See also ==
- Storm (given name)
- Storm (surname)
