= Swipe (novel) =

2012 novel by Evan Angler

- Author: Evan Angler
- Language: English
- Series: Swipe series
- Genre: Young adult novel
- Publisher: Thomas Nelson
- Publication date: 2012
- Publication place: United States
- Media type: Print (Paperback)
- Pages: 288 pp
- ISBN: 9781400318360
- OCLC: 748941680
- Followed by: Sneak

Swipe is an apocalyptic fiction novel written by Evan Angler and published in 2012. The first book in the Swipe series, it is aimed at a middle grade audience. The other books in the series are: Sneak, Storm, and Spark.

== Plot summary ==
Swipe takes place in the futuristic United States, now called the American Union, which is in the process of a merger to create a Global Union. Citizenship from birth was abolished after the States' War roughly a decade earlier, and those who want citizenship are required to undergo a Pledging process at the age of 13. Pledges are Marked—that is, they receive a wrist tattoo that will allow them to participate in the benefits of civilization. The Unmarked, those who refuse to Pledge, live as vagrants or as dependents of those who are Marked.

Logan Langly, the novel's protagonist, is nearly thirteen, the age when most young people go to be Marked. Unlike most young people, Logan is afraid of the Marking process. His older sister Lily never returned from her Pledge, and Logan fears than if he Pledges, he might be lost himself. Logan's fears, however, go beyond the Pledge. Since Lily's death, someone has been watching him, even breaking into his room on occasion. The only person who takes Logan's fears seriously is thirteen-year-old Erin Arbitor, the daughter of a government agent. She believes that the perpetrator is a Markless teenager named Peck who is wanted by the government for crimes including kidnapping, assault, and murder. Logan and Erin spend most of the book trying to hunt down Peck and his friends on their own, ostensibly to turn them into the government. Ultimately, however, Logan finds that he must judge for himself whether Peck's motives are as nefarious as the government claims.

== Characters ==
- Logan Langly: A twelve-year-old boy, quiet, determined, and somewhat paranoid. He has been followed by Peck since his sister Lily's death, but now he wants to turn the tables. Over the course of the book, he becomes best friends with Erin Arbitor, who is the catalyst for his attempts to track Peck and turn him in.
- Erin Arbitor: The thirteen-year-old daughter of a government agent. She has recently moved with her father from Beacon City, the capital, to Logan's small town of Spokie, leaving her mother behind. Erin fears that this rift between her parents may be permanent. When she learns that her father was transferred to Spokie to find Peck, she hopes that Peck's arrest could end her father's job in Spokie, thereby keeping her family together. Her initial motives for helping Logan have less to do with the danger he is in and more to do with her own personal problems. Eventually, however, she becomes close friends with Logan, and his discoveries at the end of the book force her to choose between the government and her best friend.
- Blake: An Unmarked fourteen-year-old runaway. A member of the Dust, Blake has been the one most recently following Logan.
- Daniel Peck: A seventeen-year-old fugitive. Peck is leader of a group of Unmarked teens called the Dust, whom he has used to track twelve-year-olds who are about to be Marked. In several cases, he has orchestrated kidnappings, and as a result the government issued a warrant for his arrest. Whether these kidnappings are actually misdeeds, however, depends on the interpreter. He was also the friend of Logan Langly's sister.

== Publication history ==
Swipe was released by Thomas Nelson on May 1, 2012, as both a paperback and an ebook. Author Lis Wiehl has called the Swipe series "Apocalyptic dystopian fiction at its best. Angler's sharp wit and dexterity with political themes are matched only by the thrilling suspense on every page."

== Reception ==
School Library Journal reviewer Eliza Langhans wrote, "While the novel's premise may seem familiar, the strong character development and thorough world-building make it stand out from the dystopian crowd." She recommended it to readers who enjoyed the James Dashner novel The Maze Runner as well as "other fast-paced, postapocalyse novels". Publishers Weekly said the book is "a well thought-out and well-written thriller" featuring "teenage main characters [who] have concerns easy to relate to".

== Audiobook adaptation ==
An audiobook version of Swipe, narrated by Barrie Buckner, was released by Oasis Audio in May 2012. The School Library Journal's Sheila Acosta reviewed the audiobook, saying, "Narrator Barrie Buckner does a great job of evoking the emotions of the three main characters and his reading helps to build suspense. Sure to be a hit with fans of dystopian fiction." Lasting seven hours and nine minutes, the audiobook is available in both CD and MP3 formats. Publishers Weekly gave a mixed review of Buckner's performance. The reviewer liked how his narration was "intense, pulpy, and perfectly suited to Angler's dark novel", praising him for "skillfully modulat[ing] his tone and cadence to create distinct voices for the characters". On the other hand, the review said Buckner "falters in his interpretation of young, female characters".
