= Storms (surname) =

Storms is a Dutch and German patronymic surname and may refer to:

- Albert Boynton Storms (1860–1933), American academic, university administrator, and Methodist theologian
- Charlie Storms (1820/21–1881), American gunfighter and gambler
- Émile Storms (1846–1918), Belgian soldier and explorer
- Godfrid Storms (1911–2003), Dutch medievalist
- Harrison Storms (1915–1992), American aeronautical engineer
- Henry Storms (c. 1795–1874), American merchant and politician
- Justin Storms (born 1981), American artist and musician
- Kirsten Storms (born 1984), American actress
- Réginald Storms (1880–1948), Belgian sport shooter
- Ronda Storms (born 1965), American politician from Florida
- Sam Storms (born 1951), American Calvinist, theologian, pastor and author
- Tim Storms (born 1972), American singer and composer
- Waneta Storms (born 1968), Canadian actor

== Fictional ==
- Serge A. Storms, the main fictional character in most of Tim Dorsey's novels

== See also ==
- Storm (surname)
- Storm (given name)
- Storm (disambiguation)
