= Tommy Storm and the Galactic Knights =

2009 novel by A.J. Healy

- Author: A.J. Healy
- Language: English
- Series: Tommy Storm
- Genre: Science-Comedy Fiction
- Publisher: Quercus
- Publication date: 24 September 2009
- Publication place: Ireland
- ISBN: 978-1-84724-755-1
- Preceded by: Tommy Storm

Tommy Storm and the Galactic Knights is the second novel in the Tommy Storm series, written by Irish author A.J. Healy. Set three years after the first Tommy Storm, Tommy and his friends travel across the universe searching for answers about the TFC. They must escape the evil Nack Jickilson, and seek help from the Beast of Hellsbells. Unbeknownst to them, A-Sad-Bin-Liner is planning to destroy thousands of planets, including Earth.

Tommy Storm and the Galactic Knights, abbreviated TS2, was published in Ireland on 24 September 2009, by UK publisher, Quercus.

== Reception ==
In a mixed review, the Sunday Mercury said, "Tommy Storm is not a particularly likeable character, and although this book is riddled with intelligent crossreferences meant to amuse, it just comes across as though it's trying too hard to impress. Billed as a comedy adventure, it's not that funny and the adventure is confusing. However, being confusing means that it's unpredictable to the end, and it is heart-warming in parts." Mary Shine Thompson of the Irish Times praised the book, writing, "The book is crammed with characters with names such as A-Sad-Bin-Liner and the kind of smart-alec ripostes, puns (there's a Straddlevarious violin) and exclamations that many youngsters find hilarious."
