= Bismarck, West Virginia =

Unincorporated community in West Virginia, United States

- Unincorporated community
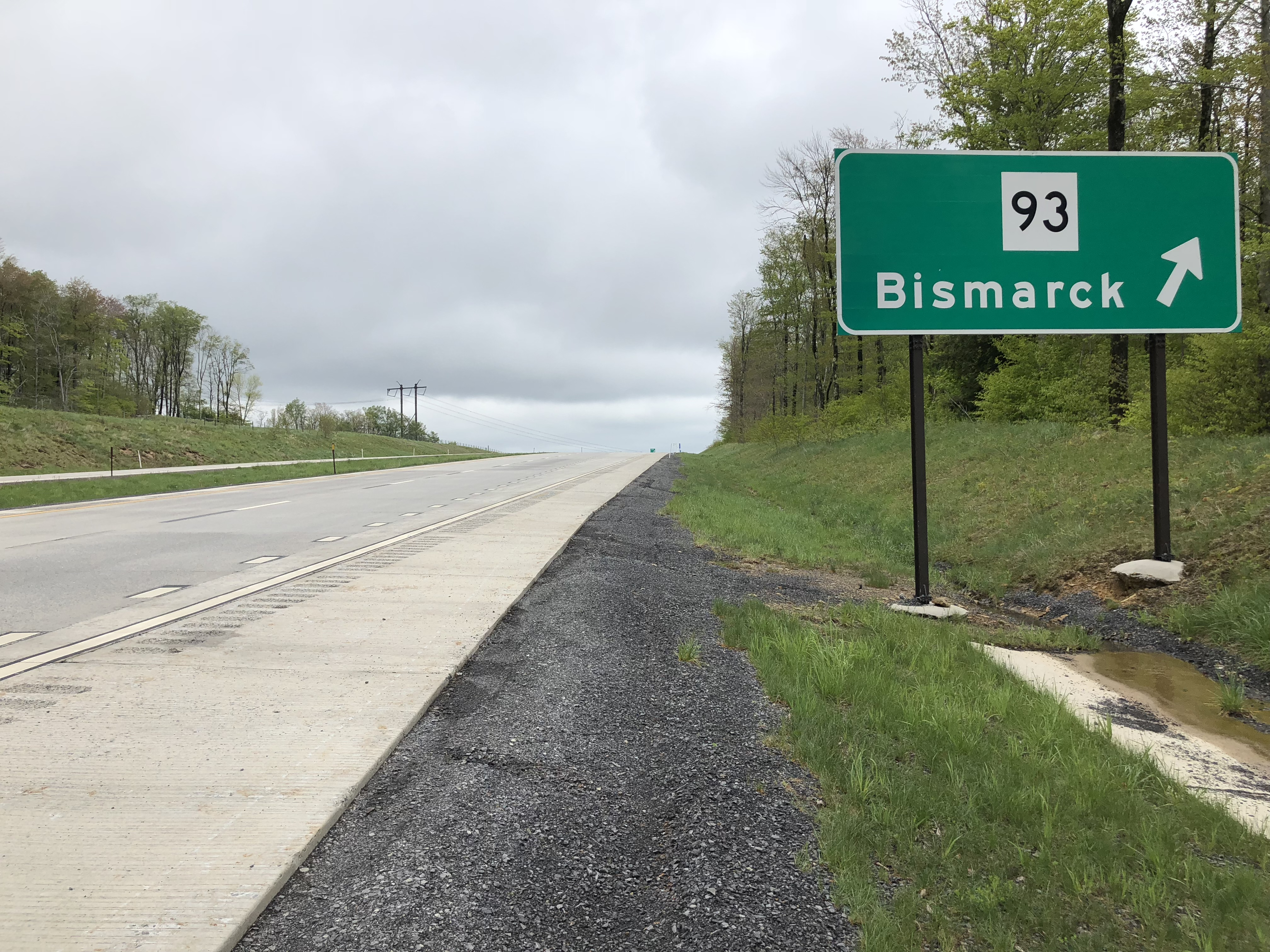
- Bismarck exit along U.S. Route 48

- Location within West Virginia Location within the United States
- Coordinates: 39°13′4″N 79°13′59″W
- Country: United States
- State: West Virginia
- County: Grant
- Time zone: UTC-5 (Eastern (EST))
  - Summer (DST): UTC-4 (EDT)
- GNIS feature ID: 1549596

Bismarck is an unincorporated community in Grant County, West Virginia, United States. It lies on West Virginia Route 93 and U.S. Route 48 near Mount Storm Lake.

Bismarck was named in honor of Minister President of Prussia Otto von Bismarck (April 1, 1815 – July 30, 1898). Because of various spellings including Bismarch and Bismark, the Board on Geographic Names officially decided upon Bismarck in 1895.
