= Stormy Lake =

Stormy Lake may refer to:

- Stormy Lake (Alaska), a lake on the Kenai Peninsula in Alaska, U.S.
- Stormy Lake (Ontario) or Patterson Lake, a lake in Parry Sound District, Ontario, Canada
- Stormy Lake (Haliburton County, Ontario), a lake in Haliburton County, Ontario, Canada
- Stormy Lake, a lake near Conover, Wisconsin, U.S.
