= Stony River (West Virginia) =

River in Grant County, West Virginia, US

Coordinates: 39°19′39″N 79°16′18″W

The Stony River is a 26.7-mile-long (43.0 km) tributary of the North Branch Potomac River in Grant County in West Virginia's Eastern Panhandle. The Stony River joins with the North Branch at the Mineral County border. Its source lies north of the Dolly Sods Wilderness on the Tucker County border in the Allegheny Front. Tributaries of the Stony River include Mud Run, Red Sea Run, Morgan Run, Helmick Run, Fourmile Run, Laurel Run, and Mill Run.

Near its source, the Stony River was once dammed by the Stony River Dam to create Stony River Reservoir between 4,377-foot (1,334 m) Cabin Mountain and 2,733-foot (833 m) Fore Knobs. The dam, owned by the West Virginia Pulp and Paper Co., failed around 3am on January 15, 1914, causing a substantial flood in small towns downriver. The center portion of the dam has since been demolished and the reservoir drained. Further north, the Stony River is dammed again to form the 1,200-acre (490 ha) Mount Storm Lake.

== See also ==
- List of West Virginia rivers
