= Selina Storm =

German politician (born 1987)

Member of the Hamburg Parliament
- Incumbent
- Assumed office 26 March 2025

Personal details
- Born: 1987 (age 38–39)
- Party: Alliance 90/The Greens (since 2006)

Selina Storm (born 1987) is a German politician serving as a member of the Hamburg Parliament since 2025. She has served as co-chair of Alliance 90/The Greens Hamburg since 2025.
