= San Storm =

Overview
- Manufacturer: San Motors India LTD
- Production: 1998 - 2013

Body and chassis
- Class: Roadster
- Body style: 2-door roadster
- Layout: FF layout

Powertrain
- Engine: 1149cc Renault D7F inline 4

Dimensions
- Wheelbase: 2,250 mm (88.6 in)
- Length: 3,543 mm (139.5 in)
- Width: 1,504 mm (59.2 in)
- Height: 1,325 mm (52.2 in)
- Curb weight: 820 kg (1,808 lb)

The San Storm is a two-seat Roadster from San Motors India LTD. of India that was introduced in 1998. It was designed by the French firm, Le Mans Group. It is powered by a 1149 cc Renault D7F engine driving the front wheels giving 60 bhp (45 kW) and a top speed of 144 km/h (89 mph). It has a double-skinned, fibreglass-reinforced tubular steel body and chassis, and the weight is only 760 kg (1,676 lb) giving it a quite satisfactory power-to-weight ratio. The time from 0 to 100 km/h (62 mph) is given as 13 seconds. The San Storm is assembled in Bangalore while the engine is mated to the bodywork in Goa.

== Export ==
In the early 2000s, the Reliant motor company of the United Kingdom began to concentrate on importing "speciality" vehicles rather than its traditional business designing and manufacturing a range of small (often three-wheeler) cars. As well as a number of "light vehicles" made by Piaggio and Ligier, the firm had plans to import the Storm and its cabriolet sister car. However, even though the company had start dates for the importation of these cars, the plan never came to fruition.

The convertible version of the Storm has been imported into the UK and sold by Dream Machines, a company based in Heathfield, East Sussex.

This subcompact car was available with different comfort and safety features like power window, power steering, child safety locks, front fog lights, rear defogger, leather seats, etc. This car comes with the luxury of air-conditioner.

== Technical specifications ==
Dimensions
Overall Length : 3,543 mm (139.5 in)
Overall Width : 1,504 mm (59.2 in)
Overall Height :1,325 mm (52.2 in)
Wheel Base :2,250 mm (88.6 in)
Ground Clearance :135 mm (5.3 in)
Kerb Weight :820 kg (1,808 lb).
Gross Vehicle Weight :1,510 kg (3,329 lb).
No of Doors : 2 door

Capacity
Seating Capacity : 2 person
Fuel Tank Capacity : 36 L (10 US gal; 8 imp gal)

Engine
Engine Type/Model: Renault D7 F
Displacement : 1149 cc
Power : 60 PS (44 kW; 59 hp) @ 5250 rpm
Torque : 94 N⋅m (69 lb⋅ft) @ 2500 rpm
Bore : 69 mm (2.7 in)
Stroke : 77 mm (3.0 in)
No of Cylinders : 4 cylinder
Fuel Type : gasoline

Transmission
Transmission Type : Manual
Gears/Speeds : 5 Gears

Suspensions
Front Suspension : Independent double wishbone with coil over shocks and anti roll bar
Rear Suspension : Trailing link with coil over shocks and antiroll bar

Steering
Power Assisted : Standard
Minimum Turning Radius : 5.6 m

Brakes
Front Brakes : Ventilated disc with piston sliding calipers
Rear Brakes : Drum Brake

Wheels & Tyres
Wheel Type : tubeless tyres
Wheel Size : 5J X R13
Tyres : 155/70 R 14

Mileage
City: 11.9 Kmpl
Highway: 16 Kmpl
