= Ashford Power Station =

- Country: England
- Location: Ashford, Kent
- Coordinates: 51°08′44″N 00°52′08″E
- Status: A & B: demolished Peaking: operational
- Construction began: A: 1923 B: 1954 Peaking: 2018
- Commission date: A: 1923 B: 1954 Peaking: 2018
- Decommission date: A: 1967 B: 1981
- Owners: Ashford Urban District Council (1923–1948); British Electricity Authority (1948–1955); Central Electricity Authority (1955–1957); Central Electricity Generating Board (1958–1981)
- Operator: As owner

Thermal power station
- Primary fuel: A: Fuel oil B: Diesel Peaking: Natural gas
- Turbine technology: Reciprocating Engines
- Cooling towers: B: 1
- Cooling source: A: cooling ponds B: cooling tower Peaking: Air cooled heat exchanger
- Combined cycle?: No
- Cogeneration?: No

Power generation
- Units operational: A: 3 × 300 kW, 1 × 700 kW, 1 × 450 kW B: 5 × 2 MW Peaking 14 × 1.5 MW
- Make and model: A: Ruston/ English Electric B: Mirrlees/ Bush Peaking: Jensbacher
- Units decommissioned: A & B: all units decommissioned
- Nameplate capacity: A: 2.05 MW B: 10 MW Peaking 21 MW
- Capacity factor: A: see table in text
- Annual net output: A & B: see table and graph

Ashford Power Station refers to any of three, engine-driven, electricity generating stations located in Ashford, Kent. Two of the stations, A and B, have been demolished, and one is an operational 21 MW peaking plant.

== Ashford A ==
Ashford A power station (also known as Ashford Electricity Works) was located in Victoria Road, Ashford. It was adjacent to, and south of, the London to Dover railway, 575 metres north west of Ashford International railway station.

The power station was built in 1925 to provide electricity to the town of Ashford. It was initially owned and operated by Ashford Urban District Council. The plant consisted of Ruston vertical oil engines coupled to three 400 kW alternators. In 1928 a Davey-Paxman 8-cylinder oil engine coupled to a 600 kW English Electric alternator followed in 1929 by another English Electric 800kW alternator. In 1931 a Ruston engine was installed coupled to a 900kW . The total electricity generating capacity was now 3.5 MW. The alternators generated electricity at 6.6 kV, Alternating Current, 3-phase, 50 Hz, and supplied electricity through transformer sub-stations to consumers in the local area.

Cooling water for the engines was obtained from, and returned to, cooling water ponds to the south of the site. There were two rectangular fuel oil storage tanks on the north of the site.

From 1926 the station continued to be operated by Ashford Council but was under the direction of the Central Electricity Board. Upon nationalisation of the British electricity industry in 1948 ownership was vested in the British Electricity Authority (1948–55), then the Central Electricity Authority (1955–57), and finally in the Central Electricity Generating Board (CEGB) from 1958.

The power station operator lived in a house (Lindum House) on the site.

The electricity output from the station, over the period 1946–67 was as follows.

Ashford A power station electricity output
Year	1946	1954	1961	1962	1963	1964	1965	1966	1967
Electricity generated, GWh	1.82	0.26	1.091	1.072	1.46	2.94	0.929	1.371	0.217
Load as % of output capacity	—	—	—	6.1	8.33	2.94	5.3	7.8	1.2

In 1954 the station used 100 tons of fuel. The thermal efficiency of the station in 1961 was 25.64 per cent.

In 1966 the plant generating capacity was down-rated to 1.3 MW. Ashford A station was decommissioned in late 1967 and was subsequently demolished.

== Ashford B ==
Ashford B power station was built in 1954 adjacent to the A station. It was designed, built and operated by the British Electricity Authority. Ownership was transferred to the Central Electricity Authority in 1955, and finally to the CEGB in 1958.

The prime movers were diesel internal combustion engines connected to alternators. The plant comprised five Mirrlees Bickerton & Day, Ltd., twelve-cylinder pressure-charge diesel engine rated at 2,900 b.h.p. at 428 r.p.m., direct coupled to a 2 MW Brush alternator. The contract with Mirrlees was valued at £200,000. Three of the sets were commissioned in October 1954, and the remaining two in the August 1955. The output capacity of the completed B station was 10 MW. The Brush alternators generated electricity at 6.760 kV AC, 3-phase, 50 Hz.

Cooling of the plant was by a single film induced-draught timber cooling tower; the cooling water flow was 160,050 gallons per hour (202 litres/s).

Electricity output from the station, in GWh, over the period 1955–81

The thermal efficiency of the station in 1961 was 33.97 per cent. In 1972 the average load was 31.9 per cent of the maximum output capacity.

In 1973 the CEGB applied for planning consent to construct an additional generating station on the site of the existing B station. A public inquiry was held in July 1974. In the light of the oil crisis of 1973–74 and the consequent economic downturn the plans were not developed any further.

The B station was decommissioned in 1981 and was subsequently demolished. All that remains (in 2019) on the site are the concrete foundations of the buildings.

== Ashford Peaking Plant ==
AMP Clean Energy Limited (formerly Ashford Power, UK) commissioned a 21 MW peaking plant in May 2018. Design and construction of the station on the Kingsnorth industrial estate (TR 00511 40888) in Ashford was managed by Clarke Energy. The plant comprises 14 gas engine and alternator sets, each delivering 1.5 MW of electricity. The engines are GE Jensbacher gas engines fuelled by natural gas. The plant is started-up as requested by the national grid at times of peak demand. This is expected to be for 1,500 to 2,000 hours per year. The plant is unattended and is operated and monitored remotely.

== Other developments ==
In August 2018 Henwood Power Ltd applied for planning permission to build a new Short Term Operating Reserve (STOR) electricity power station on the Henwood industrial estate in Ashford. This would comprise nine natural gas-fired engines located within a former cold store building. The planning application was withdrawn by the applicant in September 2018.
