= Storm (Angler novel) =

2013 novel by Evan Angler

- Author: Evan Angler
- Language: English
- Series: Swipe series
- Genre: Young adult novel
- Published: 2013 (Thomas Nelson)
- Publication place: United States
- Media type: Print (Paperback)
- Pages: 288 pp
- ISBN: 1400321972
- OCLC: 816032138
- Preceded by: Sneak
- Followed by: Spark

Storm is an apocalyptic fiction novel by Evan Angler and is aimed at a middle grade audience. The third book in the Swipe series, it was published in 2013.

== Plot ==
Storm finds the Global Union, and particularly its American component, in chaos. The Markless, non-citizens who have refused to undergo the Pledging process, are protesting their treatment. In the past, it has been easier for Marked citizens to simply ignore the Markless and go on with their comfortable lives. Now the Markless are forcing them to confront what they really believe about the government and its leaders—Chancellor Cylis, the head of the Global Union; and General Lamson, who oversees the American Union.

13-year-old Logan Langly, however, has more immediate concerns. His best friend, Erin Arbitor, is dying from a manufactured disease called Project Trumpet. Erin was vaccinated against the disease at her Pledge, but somehow she came into contact with an activation protein that causes vaccinated people to come down with the illness. The only hope for Erin is to find Dr. Rhyne, the scientist who designed Project Trumpet in the first place. Logan, Erin, Daniel Peck, and Hailey Phoenix undertake a cross-country drive to find Dr. Rhyne and cure Erin. But when they arrive at Dr. Rhyne's West Coast laboratory, they learn that the doctor cannot help them without knowing what protein triggered Erin's illness.

Meanwhile, Logan's sister Lily, now a high-ranking member of the military, finds herself in a difficult situation. Cylis and Lamson are not working together as well as they would have the public believe, and Cylis wants to use Lilly as a double agent against Lamson. Lamson has his own operative on the ground, however—a teenager named Connor Goodman. Lily opposes both Lamson and Cylis, but Connor presents the most immediate threat against her plans to undermine the government. If Lily is to stop Connor, she must enlist the help of Logan and his friends, who are reluctant to trust her because of her calculated betrayal in Sneak. Logan desperately wants to believe in his sister, despite their past. Lily's secrecy, however, means that when Logan agrees to carry out her plans, he underestimates the cost.

== Characters ==
- Logan Langly: A thirteen-year-old at the center of the Markless protests. Logan escaped from his Pledge and broke into Acheron in order to find his older sister, Lilly, only to find that she did not want to be rescued.
- Lily Langly: An eighteen-year-old military officer. Also Logan's older sister, Lily flunked her Pledge and was taken to the prison/military complex of Acheron. She resisted brainwashing and learned to pretend loyalty to the government, even as she began secretly plotting to destroy it.
- Erin Arbitor: Logan's Marked best friend. Erin originally supported the government, and she betrayed Logan several times before coming to his aid during his Acheron break-in. An accomplished computer hacker, she is dying of the Project Trumpet virus.
- Daniel Peck: The teenage leader of the Dust. Peck was Lilly's best friend in middle school and went Markless in response to her disappearance. Forming a Markless group called the Dust, he attempted to save other young teens from Lilly's fate. But Peck's world is changing, and in Sierra City he finds that he must follow a new calling—one possibly separate from that of Logan and the Dust.
- Hailey Phoenix: A thirteen-year-old who is one of Logan's oldest friends. Hailey accompanies Logan, Peck, and Erin to Sierra City.
- Eddie: A thirteen-year-old former member of the Dust. Eddie was captured and brainwashed as a result of the Acheron break-in. The brainwashing proved temporary, however, and Eddie becomes Lilly's assistant as she works to destroy the government from within.
- The Dust: Peck's Markless huddle. Six of its members—14-year-old Blake; 15-year-old Jo; 13-year-olds Tyler, Shawn, and Meg; and 6-year-old Rusty—are left in Beacon City when Peck, Logan, Erin, and Hailey go west. Tyler is determined to locate Eddie, his best friend, despite the fact that Eddie is technically a member of the IMPS military force. The others are determined to keep Tyler alive.
- Dr. Arianna Rhyne: The free-spirited scientist who invented the Project Trumpet virus. Dr. Rhyne created the virus as part of a test project, but when Erin contracts the virus from a different activation protein than the one Dr. Rhyne had planned, she struggles to determine a cure. Although Dr. Rhyne is Marked and largely agrees with Global Union policies, she saves Erin, Logan, Peck, and Hailey from arrest.
- Charles and Olivia Arbitor: Erin's formerly separated parents. Erin's disappearance has forced them to work together in order to find Erin without giving away her location to the authorities. Charles suspects that Erin is hiding in Dr. Rhyne's laboratory, but he is forced to rely on his former nemeses, the Dust, to contact her, as well as to find the activation protein that could save her life.
- Dianne Phoenix: Hailey's mother, and the co-producer of an illegal radio station. She suffers from a deteriorating lung condition as a result of her work in a nanomaterials plant.
- Sonya Langly: Logan's grandmother, and Dianne's co-producer. Sophia uses the radio program to keep in touch with Logan and Hailey, ultimately helping them to complete Lilly's mission.

== Major themes ==
Storm is set in a dystopian United States that fits with a pretribulational concept of the Great Tribulation. The book also contains some references to a past Rapture. Storm differs from common pretribulational depictions of the Tribulation in that some of the environmental disasters and plagues faced by the Global Union are manmade. Additionally, the Tribulation is not a literal seven years. Storm suggests that the Rapture occurred at least fifteen years before the events of the book, while most pretribulational teaching holds that the Tribulation lasts for seven years immediately following the Rapture.

Several major characters in Storm adhere to Christianity, and Peck and Dr. Rhyne agree to disagree following a discussion on religion.

== Publication history ==
Storm was released on May 7, 2013, in paperback form. The publisher, Thomas Nelson, also released Storm in e-book format.

An audiobook version of Storm, narrated by Barrie Buckner, was released by Oasis Audio in May 2013. The School Library Journal reported, "Barrie Buckner's narration heightens the novel's suspense and drama. Although fans of the series might feel a bit let down at the conclusion of this volume, they will look forward to the next installment." The audiobook, which has a total running time of eight hours and thirty-five minutes, is available in both CD and MP3 formats.
