= Storm Mountain =

Storm Mountain may refer to:

== Canada ==
- Storm Mountain (Misty Range), a mountain in the Misty Range of Banff National Park, Alberta
- Storm Mountain (Ball Range), a mountain on the Continental Divide and British Columbia-Alberta border in the Canadian Rockies

== Falkland Islands ==
- Storm Mountain, Falkland Islands, (West Falkland)

== United States ==
- Storm Mountain (Montana), a mountain in Stillwater County, Montana

== See also ==
- Storm Peak, Ross Dependency, Antarctica
- Mount Storm (disambiguation)
