= HNoMS Storm =

Several ships of the Royal Norwegian Navy have borne the name HNoMS Storm:

- HNoMS Storm (1898) was a 1.-class torpedo boat launched in 1898 and wrecked by grounding in 1940.
- HNoMS Storm (P960) was a Storm-class fast patrol boat completed on 31 May 1963
- HNoMS Storm (1967) was a Storm-class fast patrol boat launched on 6 October 1967 and completed on 28 November 1967.
- HNoMS Storm (P961) is a Skjold-class patrol boat launched on 1 November 2006.
