= Stony River Reservoir =

- Location within West Virginia
- Location: Grant County, West Virginia, United States
- Coordinates: 39.1373°N 79.2987°W
- Type: reservoir
- Primary inflows: Stony River
- Primary outflows: Stony River
- Basin countries: United States

Stony River Reservoir was constructed on the Stony River in 1888 by Westvaco to supply the source of water for the company's main pulp mill. William Luke's summer residence was located on the lake. The dam suffered from structural weakness and was periodically drained for repairs. The center portion of the dam has since been demolished and the reservoir drained. The majority of the dam still stands on either side of the, now, free flowing river.
