= Stormie =

Stormie is a given name. Notable people with the given name include:

- Stormie Forte, American lawyer, radio host, and politician
- Stormie Jones, first recipient of a successful simultaneous heart and liver organ transplant
- Stormie Mills, Australian artist
- Stormie Omartian, American Christian author

== See also ==
- Stormy (disambiguation)
