= A Storm =

1922 painting by Georgia O'Keeffe

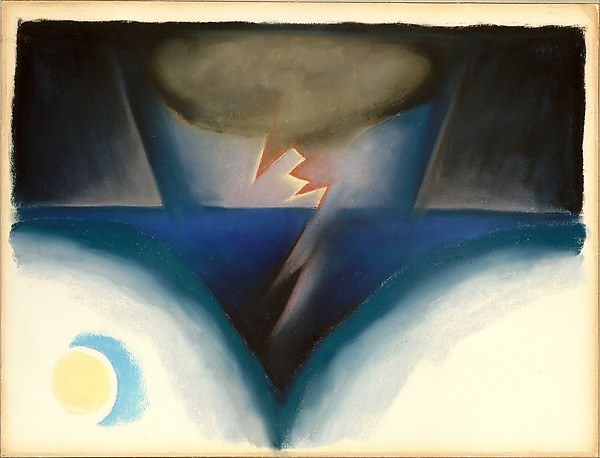
- Artist: Georgia O'Keeffe
- Year: 1922
- Medium: Pastel on paper, mounted on illustration board
- Subject: Lightning storm
- Dimensions: 46.4 cm × 61.9 cm (18 1/4 in × 24 3/8 in)
- Location: Metropolitan Museum of Art, New York
- Accession: 1981.35

A Storm, a 1922 pastel painting by Georgia O'Keeffe, shows lightning over a lake (Note: Presumably Lake George, where O'Keeffe had a studio on Alfred Stieglitz' estate.) and the reflection of the Moon, while alluding to a feminine body shape. The medium is pastel on paper, mounted on illustration board.

The painting is part of a collection of work depicting sea- and landscapes of Maine or Lake George, and were created by O'Keeffe between 1921 and 1922. The technique and style of A Storm reflects O'Keeffe's earlier preference for charcoal as a medium. It was donated to the Metropolitan Museum of Art by a private collector in 1981.
