= Storm (ice cream) =

Ice cream dessert sold at Hungry Jack's

- Storm ice cream Cookies and Cream (Oreo)
- Type: Hungry Jack's soft serve or ice cream in a cup
- Place of origin: Australia
- Invented: 2000s (as a limited test markets) 2001 (full release)

Sold at Hungry Jack's, Burger King's Australian franchise, a Storm is a flavoured ice cream dessert similar to McDonald's McFlurry ice cream. The product consists of vanilla flavoured soft serve ice cream served with either one of four flavours; Cookies & Cream (Oreo), Flake, Biscoff. The selected flavour is then whipped together with the ice cream using a blender.

== History ==
The Storm's origin comes from the late 1990s where Hungry Jack’s only made and relied on standard soft serve ice cream in ice cream cones. The Storm ice cream was fully released to Hungry Jack's in 2011 but had been trailing variants of blended ice cream desserts in limited test markets since the 2000s prior to 2011, the formal nationwide product launch—complete with the distinct branding and custom mixing machinery. Permanently on menu boards in 2011, it debuted alongside it's two original flagship flavours is Cookies and Cream (Oreo) and Cadbury Flake but since 2023, Hungry Jack's has released various limited edition Storm ice cream dessert items.

== Dessert items ==
=== Permanent menu dessert items ===
Regular and permanent menu dessert items have been around since the 2000s such as Oreos cookies and cream, Flake, Biscoff ice cream dessert (previously a limited edition item), and more.

=== Biscoff Storm ===
Since 2023, Hungry Jack's has released various limited edition Storm items. Notable limited edition Storm ice cream desserts is the Biscoff ice cream dessert which was released on 1 or 2 July, 2023 but returned on 16 July, 2024 before returning again but staying as a Permanent menu dessert item on 17 February, 2025 due to the popularity of it.

=== KitKat Storm ===
KitKat Storm ice cream

In March 2024 Hungry Jack’s released the KitKat Storm ice cream dessert and a Jack's Cafe Iced Drink made from KitKats.

=== Cosmic Storm ===
In September 2024, Hungry Jack's released a limited edition Storm ice cream dessert called the Cosmic Storm which had a type of mystery flavour.

=== Nutella Storm ===
On 1 July, 2025, Hungry Jack's released a limited edition Nutella Storm ice cream which had vanilla soft serve in it with ripples of Nutella and wafer pieces. On 6 January, 2026, the Storm was re-released due to its popularity which also came out with a Nutella Iced coffee.

=== Other Storm ice cream desserts ===
Hungry Jack’s also released Warheads storm ice cream in October 2025, and in April 2026, Hungry Jack’s released Skittles storm ice cream dessert which has Rainbow squishy chews and with Strawberry and lemon drizzle in it.
