= Mount Storm Lake =

Cooling water reservoir in West Virginia, U.S.

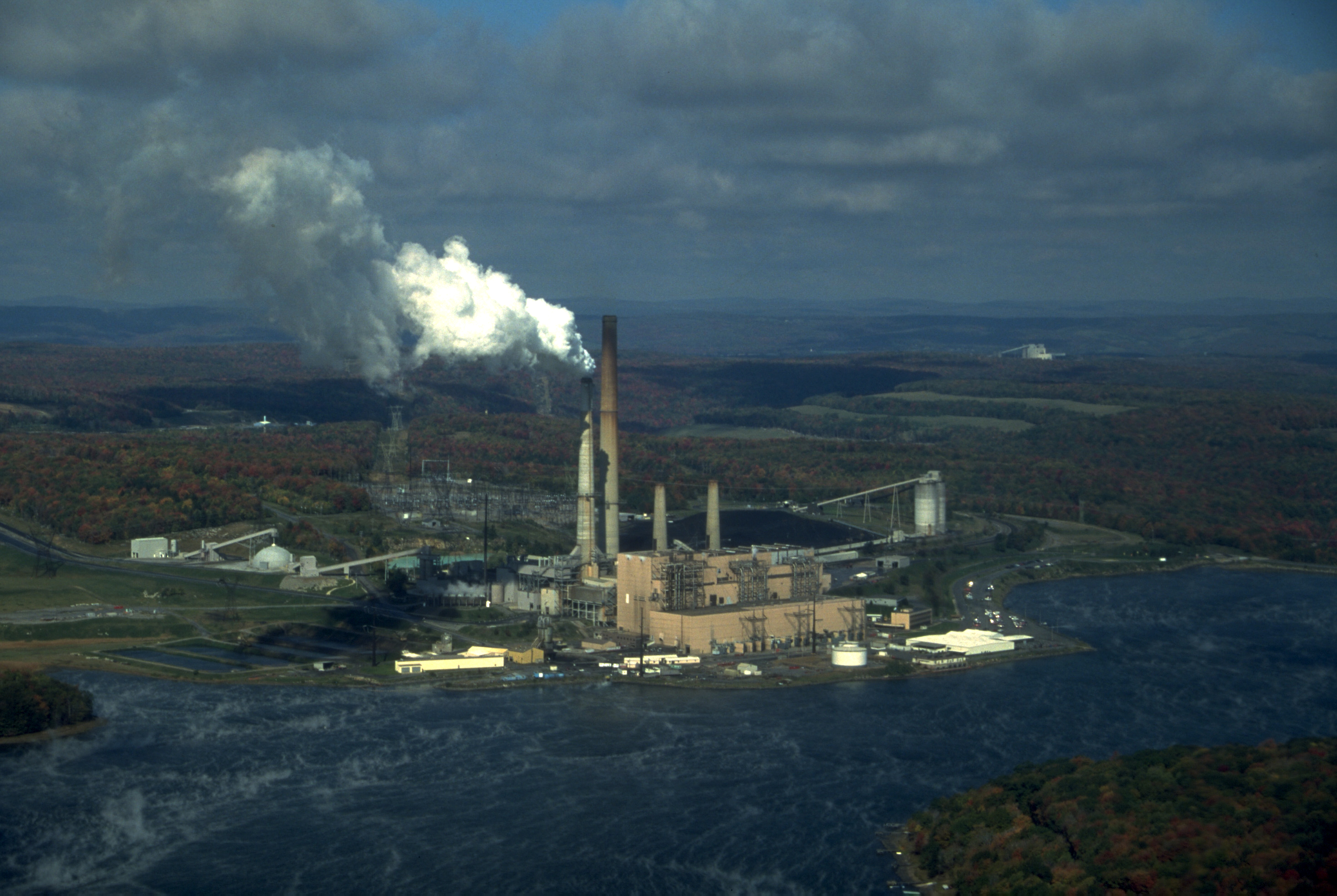
- Mount Storm Lake and Power Plant

- Location within West Virginia
- Location: Grant County, West Virginia
- Coordinates: 39°12′28″N 79°15′45″W
- Type: reservoir
- Primary inflows: Stony River
- Primary outflows: Stony River
- Basin countries: United States
- Surface area: 1,200 acres (490 ha)
- Surface elevation: 3,244 ft (989 m)

Mount Storm Lake – also known as New Stony River Reservoir – is a 1,200 acres (4.9 km^{2}) reservoir created in 1965 on the Stony River in Grant County, West Virginia. It serves as a cooling pond for the Dominion 1.6 gigawatt Mount Storm Power Station, which provides electricity to more than two million customers in Northern Virginia. The reservoir stands at an altitude of 3,244 feet (989 m).

== Recreation ==
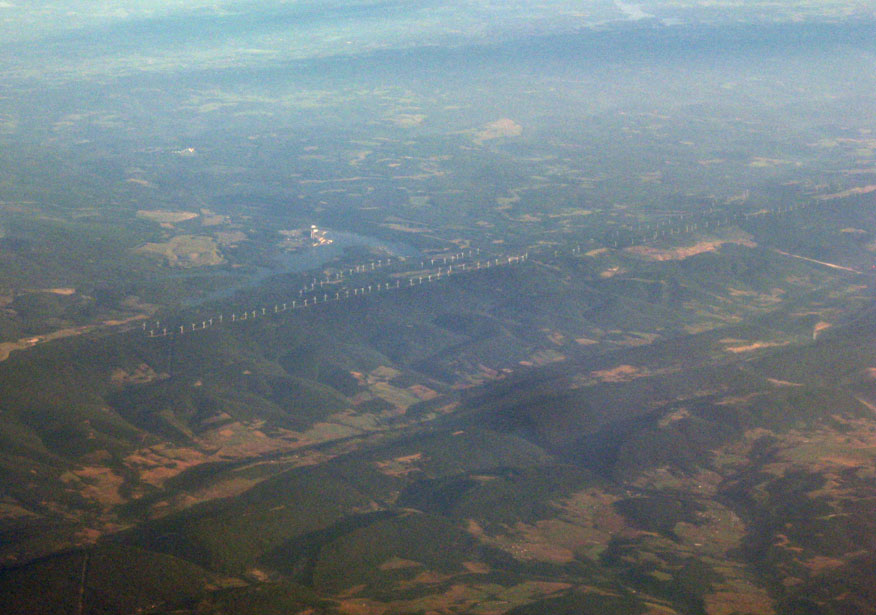
Oblique air photo of Mount Storm Lake and nearby wind turbines, facing northwest in August 2011.

Mount Storm Lake is a popular local and tourist destination. When Mount Storm Power Station uses the reservoir for cooling, it keeps Mount Storm Lake at a warm temperature that makes it perfect for swimming, boating, and water activities even in cooler weather. The reservoir's water is also extremely clear, with the light available on an average overcast day allowing swimmers to clearly see its bottom at depths of at least five to six feet.

Due to its warm temperature, the lake is a popular diving destination and training ground for scuba divers. The reservoir, which is in the upper 80s to 90s in the summer and rarely drops below fifty in the winter is outfitted with dive platforms at 30, 50, 75, and 120 feet and is regularly used by divers as a place to test equipment, maintain skill, enjoy a dive, and further training.

The lake's location on the Allegheny Front, one of the windiest spots east of the Mississippi, makes it an excellent destination for small boat sailing. There is a public boat ramp at the north end of the lake just off West Virginia Route 93. More than 40 wind turbines are visible from the lake.

== See also ==
- List of lakes of West Virginia
