= National Register of Historic Places listings in Hardy County, West Virginia =

Location of Hardy County in West Virginia

This is a list of the National Register of Historic Places listings in Hardy County, West Virginia.

This is intended to be a complete list of the properties and districts on the National Register of Historic Places in Hardy County, West Virginia, United States. The locations of National Register properties and districts for which the latitude and longitude coordinates are included below, may be seen in a Google map.

There are 25 properties and districts listed on the National Register in the county.

This National Park Service list is complete through NPS recent listings posted October 16, 2026.

Contents: Counties in West Virginia

Barbour - Berkeley - Boone - Braxton - Brooke - Cabell - Calhoun - Clay - Doddridge - Fayette - Gilmer - Grant - Greenbrier - Hampshire - Hancock - Hardy - Harrison - Jackson - Jefferson - Kanawha - Lewis - Lincoln - Logan - Marion - Marshall - Mason - McDowell - Mercer - Mineral - Mingo - Monongalia - Monroe - Morgan - Nicholas - Ohio - Pendleton - Pleasants - Pocahontas - Preston - Putnam - Raleigh - Randolph - Ritchie - Roane - Summers - Taylor - Tucker - Tyler - Upshur - Wayne - Webster - Wetzel - Wirt - Wood - Wyoming

== Listings county-wide ==
	Name on the Register	Image	Date listed	Location	City or town	Description
1	Judge J. W. F. Allen House	Judge J. W. F. Allen House	February 10, 1983 (#83003237)	South Fork Rd. 39°03′24″N 78°57′42″W	Moorefield vicinity	
2	Buena Vista Farms	Buena Vista Farms	July 10, 1985 (#85001594)	U.S. Route 220; 39°07′47″N 78°57′02″W	Old Fields	
3	Fort Pleasant	Fort Pleasant	July 16, 1973 (#73001903)	North of Moorefield; 39°08′01″N 78°56′55″W	Moorefield vicinity	
4	Henry Funkhouser Farm and Log House		November 29, 2001 (#01001326)	Funkhouser Rd., County Roads 259/9; 39°01′21″N 78°46′14″W	Baker	
5	Hickory Hill	Hickory Hill	July 10, 1985 (#85001596)	U.S. Route 220; 38°59′57″N 79°04′14″W	Petersburg vicinity	
6	P.W. Inskeep House	P.W. Inskeep House	July 10, 1985 (#85001597)	WV 55; 39°04′13″N 78°57′25″W	Moorefield	
7	Francis Kotz Farm		December 22, 2008 (#08001237)	27625 WV 55; 39°04′39″N 78°36′16″W	Wardensville vicinity	
8	Lighthorse Harry Lee Cabin	Lighthorse Harry Lee Cabin	July 30, 1974 (#74002001)	West of Mathias in Lost River State Park; 38°53′41″N 78°55′25″W	Mathias	
9	Lost River General Store	Lost River General Store	November 30, 2005 (#05001349)	6993 WV 259; 38°57′11″N 78°48′16″W	Lost River	
10	Thomas Maslin House	Thomas Maslin House	August 29, 1979 (#79002578)	131 Main St. 39°03′36″N 78°58′09″W	Moorefield	
11	John Mathias House	John Mathias House	November 24, 1978 (#78002796)	WV 259; 38°52′39″N 78°52′03″W	Mathias	
12	The Meadows	The Meadows	January 14, 1986 (#86000777)	U.S. Route 220; 39°05′09″N 78°57′20″W	Moorefield vicinity	
13	Mill Island		July 2, 1973 (#73001904)	South of Moorefield; 39°02′22″N 78°57′38″W	Moorefield vicinity	
14	Moorefield Historic District	Moorefield Historic District	January 15, 1986 (#86000774)	Portions of Main, Elm, Washington, and Winchester Sts. 39°03′35″N 78°58′12″W	Moorefield	
15	New Deal Resources in Lost River State Park Historic District	New Deal Resources in Lost River State Park Historic District	February 4, 2011 (#10001226)	321 Park Dr. 38°53′33″N 78°55′38″W	Mathias	New Deal Resources in West Virginia State Parks and Forests MPS
16	Oakland Hall		July 10, 1985 (#85001598)	U.S. Route 220; 39°00′26″N 79°00′12″W	Moorefield vicinity	
17	Old Hardy County Courthouse	Old Hardy County Courthouse	October 9, 1974 (#74002002)	Winchester Ave. and Elm St. 39°03′43″N 78°58′05″W	Moorefield	
18	Old Stone Tavern	Old Stone Tavern	December 10, 1979 (#79002579)	117 Main St. 39°03′40″N 78°58′11″W	Moorefield	
19	Stump Family Farm		December 15, 1998 (#98001471)	WV 7, southern fork of the Potomac River; 38°54′31″N 79°01′10″W	Moorefield vicinity	
20	Nicholas Switzer House	Nicholas Switzer House	December 24, 2008 (#08001238)	County Route 5 and Waites Run; 39°04′48″N 78°34′54″W	Wardensville vicinity	
21	Garrett VanMeter House		March 27, 2001 (#01000264)	Off Reynolds Gap Rd. 39°08′14″N 78°56′13″W	Old Fields	
22	Westfall Place	Westfall Place	July 10, 1985 (#85001599)	U.S. Route 220; 39°01′01″N 79°00′03″W	Moorefield vicinity	
23	Willow Wall	Willow Wall	July 2, 1973 (#73001906)	South of Old Fields; 39°07′40″N 78°57′56″W	Old Fields	
24	The Willows		July 2, 1973 (#73001905)	South of Moorefield; 39°02′00″N 78°57′43″W	Moorefield vicinity	
25	Wilson-Kuykendall Farm	Wilson-Kuykendall Farm	July 10, 1985 (#85001600)	U.S. Route 220; 39°02′20″N 78°59′10″W	Moorefield vicinity	

== See also ==
- List of National Historic Landmarks in West Virginia
- National Register of Historic Places listings in West Virginia
