= Van Meter =

Van Meter, VanMeter, Van Metre, Van Mater and Van Matre are American surnames derived from the Dutch surname Van Meteren. Most are descendants of Jan Joosten van Meteren (1626–1704) who in 1662 settled in Wiltwijck, New Netherlands, now Kingston, New York. The surname is a toponym, meaning "from Meteren" in Gelderland, the Netherlands.

== People ==
- Anna Van Meter, an American psychologist
- Edwin Van Meter Champion (1890–1970), an American politician from Illinois
- George Van Meter (1932–2007), an American cyclist
- Homer Van Meter (1905–1934), an American criminal and bank robber
- Jen Van Meter, an American comic book writer
- Josh VanMeter (born 1995), an American baseball player
- Laurence B. VanMeter (born 1958), an American judge in Kentucky
- Solomon Lee Van Meter, Jr. (1888–1937), an American inventor of the backpack parachute and the ejection seat
- Tom Van Meter (1943–1992), an American politician in Ohio
- Vicki Van Meter (1982–2008), an American pilot

=== Van Matre ===
- Joseph Van Matre (1828–1892), Union Army soldier
- Steve Van Matre (born 1941), American environmental activist, author, and educator

== Settlements ==
- Van Meter, Iowa
  - "The Heater from Van Meter", nickname baseball pitcher Bob Feller, native of Van Meter, Iowa
- Van Meter, a settlement in Pennsylvania and site of the 1907 Darr Mine Disaster
- Van Metre, South Dakota

== Buildings named for people with this surname ==
- Fort Van Meter (Hampshire County, West Virginia), an 18th-century frontier fort in named after Isaac Van Meter
  - Fort Pleasant a.k.a. Isaac Van Meter House, a nearby historic home built in the late 18th century.
  - Garrett VanMeter House, a nearby 19th century historic home
- Fort Van Meter (disambiguation), various other forts
- Van Meter Hall, a building on the campus of Western Kentucky University

== Other things named for people with this surname ==
- Van Meter State Park in Missouri named in 1834 after the Vanmeter family who settled there in 1834
- Van Metre Ford Stone Bridge in West Virginia

== See also ==
- Jacobus van Meteren (1519–?), Dutch financier and printer of early English versions of the Bible
- Emanuel van Meteren (1535–1612), historian and Consul for "the Traders of the Low Countries" in London, son of Jacobus
- Harry von Meter (1871–1956), American silent film actor
