= Willow Wall =

Historic house in West Virginia, United States

- U.S. National Register of Historic Places
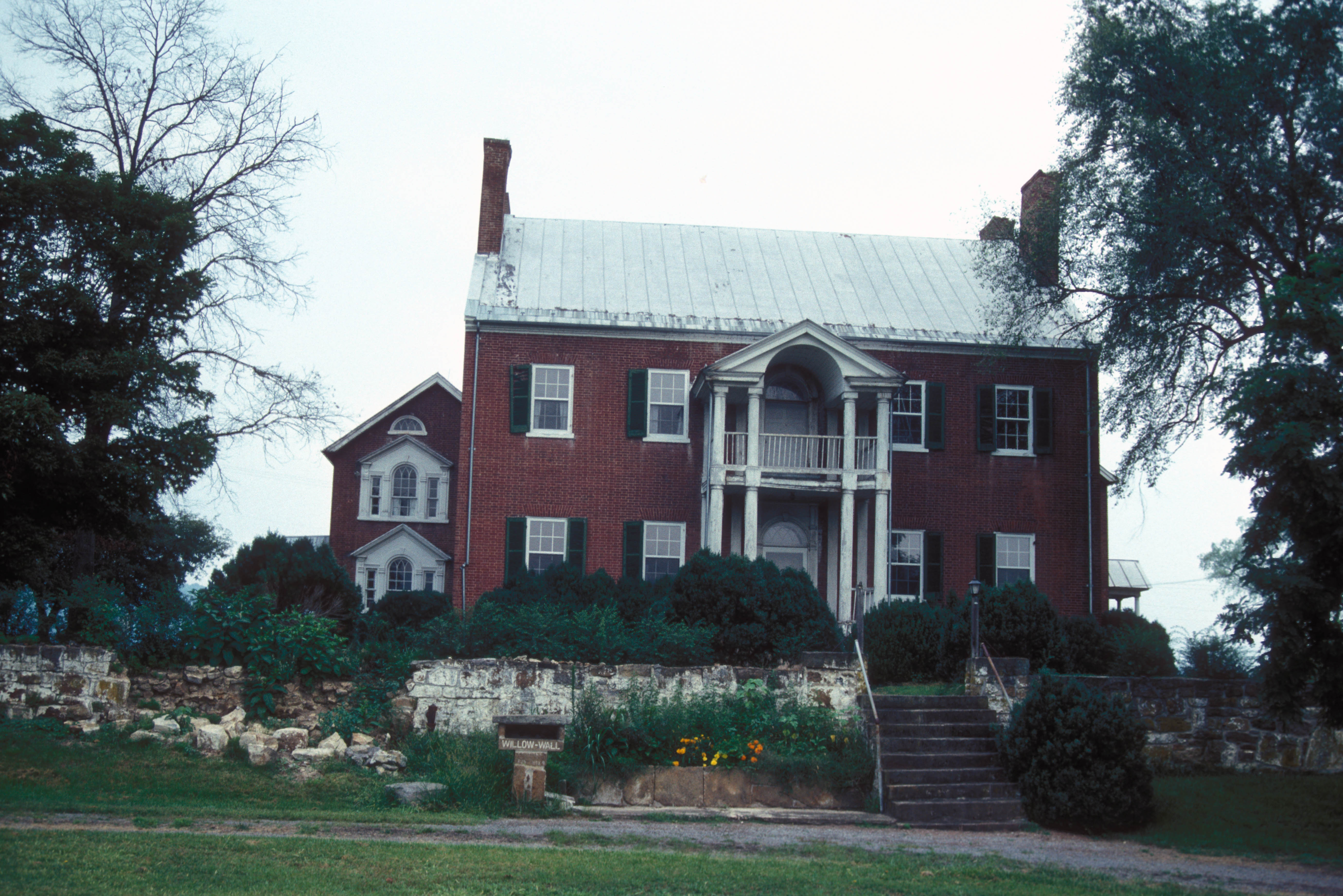

- Location within Eastern Panhandle of West Virginia Location within West Virginia Location within the United States
- Location: On US 220. 1 mi. south of Old Fields, WV, 4 mi. north of Moorefield, WV
- Coordinates: 39°7′40″N 78°57′56″W
- Area: 1 acre (0.40 ha)
- Built: 1811-1812
- Architectural style: Georgian
- MPS: South Branch Valley MRA
- NRHP reference No.: 73001906
- Added to NRHP: July 2, 1973

"Willow Wall", also known as McNeill Family House, is an American historic home located near Old Fields, Hardy County, West Virginia. It was built in 1811–1812, and is a two-story, U-shaped brick dwelling in the Georgian-Tidewater style. It has a double Georgian porch, outlined by Ionic order columns. The two wings have double Palladian windows on the front gable ends. The interior features the French hand-printed wallpaper "The Passing of the Chase." The property was first settled in between 1760 and 1770 by Daniel McNeill. During the American Civil War the McNeill properties were centers of activity for McNeill's Rangers and the Willow Wall residence was used as a hospital for wounded men.

The Battle of Moorefield of August 7, 1864 (also styled the Battle of Old Fields) began outside Willow Wall. It followed Jubal Early's Confederate raid upon Washington, and his cavalry under McCauseland and Johnson's ensuing burning of Chambersburg, PA. General Johnson was staying in a second-floor room of Willow Wall, and he escaped out a window. The Confederate losses suffered in the battle left them unable to control the Shenandoah Valley and marked the increasing Union dominance in the Valley.

Daniel McNeill, who died 1844, is buried in a tomb across the road and about 50 yds. to the south near a pond.

Willow Wall has strong architectural and historical connections to four nearby Van Meter family dwellings: Buena Vista Farms, Traveler's Rest, Fort Pleasant, and the Garrett VanMeter House.

Willow Wall was listed on the National Register of Historic Places in 1973.
