= Fort Van Meter =

Fort Van Meter, or Fort VanMeter or Van Meter Fort, may refer to any of several 18th-century frontier forts built in the eastern United States by members of the pioneering Dutch-American Van Meter family:

- Fort Van Meter (Hampshire County, West Virginia) (ca. 1754), built by Henry Van Meter (1718-1778)
- Fort Van Meter (1756), former name of Fort Pleasant, Hardy County, West Virginia (built by Isaac Van Meter (1692-1757))
- Fort Van Meter (1774), Short Creek, Ohio County, West Virginia
- Fort Van Meter (1770s), Muddy Creek, Greene County, Pennsylvania (built by Jacob Van Meter, Sr (1722-1798))
- Fort Van Meter (1770s), Swan's Run, Greene County, Pennsylvania (built by Henry Van Meter)
- Van Meter Fort (1780), Hardin County, Kentucky (built by Jacob Van Meter, Sr)
