= Fort Van Meter (Hampshire County, West Virginia) =

- U.S. National Register of Historic Places
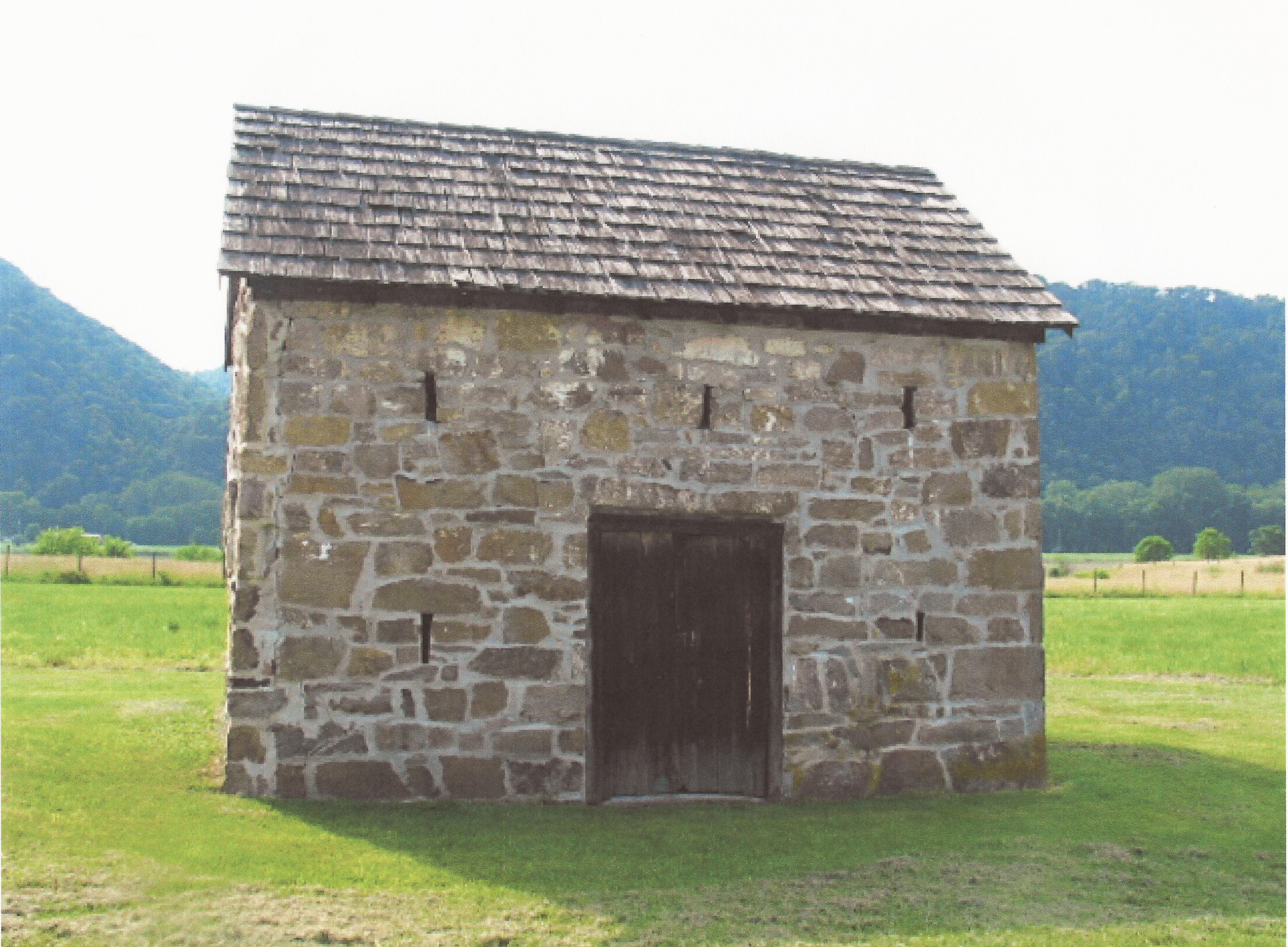

- Location within Eastern Panhandle of West Virginia Location within West Virginia Location within the United States
- Location: South Branch River Road (County Route 8), Glebe, West Virginia
- Coordinates: 39°14′10″N 78°50′30″W
- Area: 1.9 acres (0.77 ha)
- Built: 1754
- Architectural style: side-gabled
- NRHP reference No.: 09001191
- Added to NRHP: December 30, 2009

Fort Van Meter — or Fort VanMeter — is a mid-18th century frontier fort in the South Branch Potomac River Valley about 9 miles (14 km) southwest of Romney in Hampshire County, West Virginia, USA. It is located 15 miles (24 km) northeast of Moorefield and about a mile northeast of the former community of Glebe at the northern end of the rugged river gorge known as The Trough.

Fort Van Meter, a small rectangular stone building erected around 1754 for the protection of white settlers against hostile Indians of the Delaware and Shawnee tribes, is still standing and has been listed on the National Register of Historic Places (NRHP) since 2009.

== Description ==
Fort Van Meter is a small rectangular building constructed of uncoursed local stone and surmounted by a pitched and side-gabled roof. (The roof's presently exposed rafters and cedar shake shingles were reconstructed in 1987.) Its floor measures about 19.6 feet by 13.8 feet. The walls are about 15 inches thick and feature several firing ports (loopholes) to allow defense of the fort by musket fire. (These are about 6-12 inches high and 2-3 inches wide.)

== History ==
About 10 years prior to the fort's construction, the area approximately 8 miles upstream (the southern end of "The Trough") known as "Indian Old Fields" had been settled by Isaac Van Meter (ca. 1696–1757), his wife Annetje Wynkoop, and their four children. This Dutch-American family constructed a fortified log residence there in 1744. The earliest documents related to the land on which Fort Van Meter was constructed date to 11 June 1749 when Thomas, Lord Fairfax conveyed "Lot 2" (consisting of 405 acres) to Henry Van Meter (probably Isaac's son).

By about 1754, two years before the open outbreak of hostilities known as the French and Indian War, the family felt it necessary to build the stronger structure downstream at what came to be called Fort Van Meter. (Somewhat confusingly, the upstream settlement — known as Fort Pleasant and also listed on the NRHP since 1973 — was also long known as "Fort Van Meter". Nothing remains of the elaborate wooden stockade and blockhouse at Fort Pleasant.) These structures were part of a long chain of fortifications built along the frontier of the Allegheny Mountains at that time, and especially after 1756. Fort Van Meter was relatively small among these and was never garrisoned by Colonel George Washington's Virginia Regiment as there would have been no barracks to accommodate troops. However, unlike most of the others, which were wooden, it was made of stone and so has survived relatively intact to the present day.

Fort Van Meter may have been built by a skilled local mason named Nathaniel Kuykendall and his son Isaac, who are known to have been active in the South Branch River valley at the time. During later and more peaceful days, the fort was used to salt and store meat. The property passed to an Abraham Van Meter in 1804, but finally passed out of the family altogether when it was sold in 1833. Fort Van Meter is one of five significant Van Meter family dwellings that survive today; the others are Fort Pleasant, Traveler's Rest, Garrett VanMeter House, and Buena Vista Farms.

== See also ==
- List of historic sites in Hampshire County, West Virginia
- National Register of Historic Places listings in Hampshire County, West Virginia
