= Kuykendall =

Kuykendall is a Dutch surname. Notable people with the surname include:

- Andrew J. Kuykendall (1815–1891), American politician
- Bobby Dall, born Robert Harry Kuykendall (born 1963), American bass player in the rock band Poison
- Dan Kuykendall (1924–2008), American politician and businessman
- Fulton Kuykendall (1953–2024), American football player
- James Sloan Kuykendall (1878–1928), American farmer, lawyer, and politician
- Kathy Kuykendall (born 1956), American tennis player
- Kurt Kuykendall (born 1952), American soccer goalkeeper
- Laura Kuykendall (1883–1935), American college professor and college administrator
- Marlin Kuykendall, American politician
- Pete Kuykendall (1938–2017), American bluegrass musician, songwriter, discographer and magazine & music publisher
- Ralph Simpson Kuykendall (1885–1963), American historian
- Shawn Kuykendall (1982–2014), American soccer player
- Steven T. Kuykendall (1947–2021), American politician

== See also ==
- Kuykendall Polygonal Barn, in the South Branch Potomac River valley near Romney in Hampshire County, West Virginia
- Wilson-Kuykendall Farm, historic home located near Moorefield, Hardy County, West Virginia
- Kay Kendall (1927–1959), English actress
