= The Meadows (Moorefield, West Virginia) =

Historic house in West Virginia, United States

- U.S. National Register of Historic Places
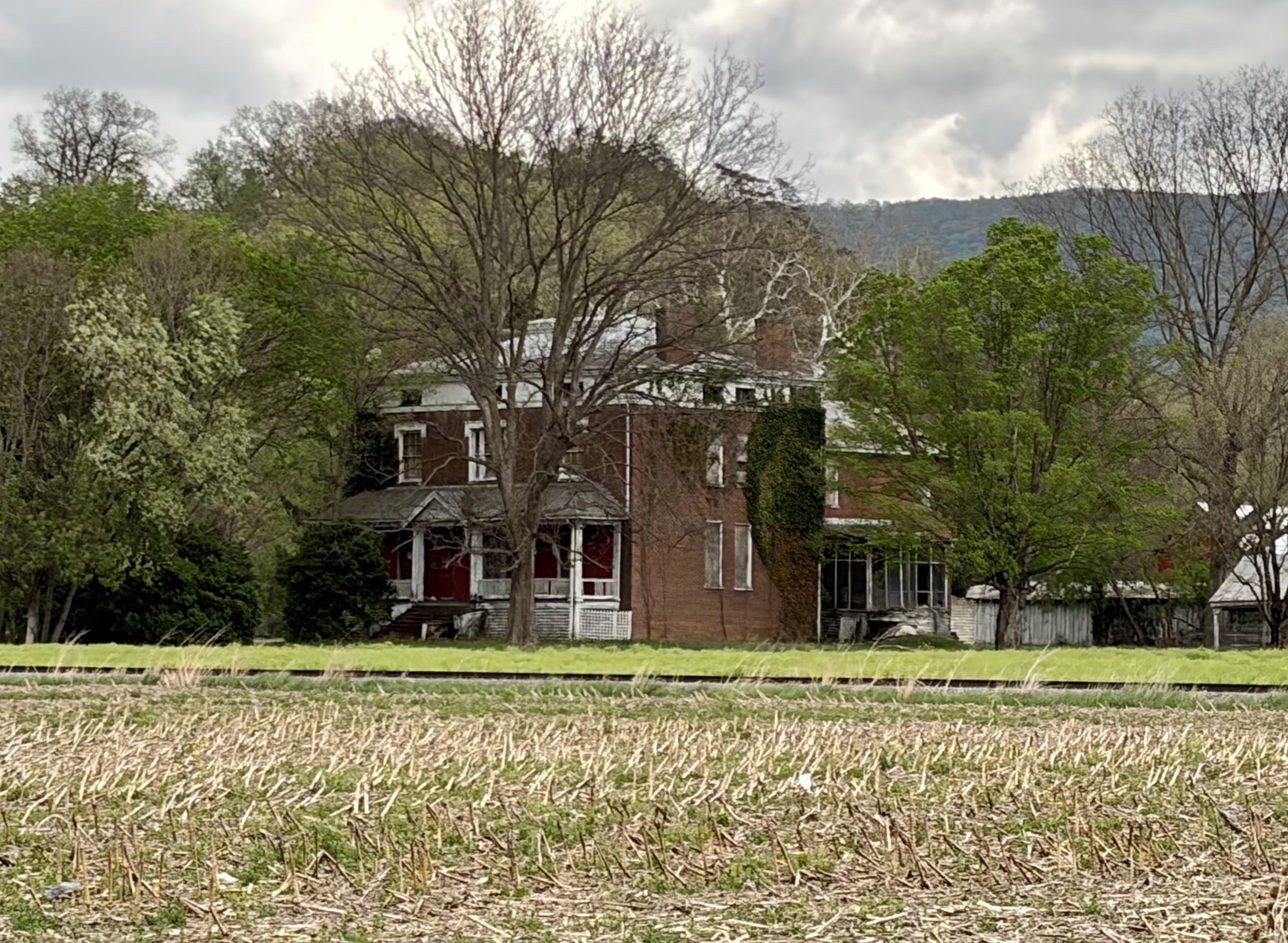
- The Meadows in 2026

- Location within Eastern Panhandle of West Virginia Location within West Virginia Location within the United States
- Nearest city: Moorefield, West Virginia
- Coordinates: 39°5′9″N 78°57′20″W
- Area: 2 acres (0.81 ha)
- Built: 1850
- Architectural style: Greek Revival
- MPS: South Branch Valley MRA (64000964)
- NRHP reference No.: 86000777
- Added to NRHP: 14 January 1986

The Meadows is a historic property near Moorefield, West Virginia.

== Description and history ==
The complex on the property includes a large brick farmhouse, two small barns and an outhouse. The property is associated with John Hanson McNeill a confederate soldier and irregular. Eleanor Roosevelt stayed there in 1941 and mentioned it in her newspaper column My Day. It was listed on the National Register of Historic Places on January 14, 1986, as part of the South Branch Valley Multiple Resource Area.

== See also ==
- American Civil War
- Bushwhacker
- Historic preservation
- National Register of Historic Places in Hardy County, West Virginia
