= Wanita Dokish =

American baseball player

- Third base / Outfield
- Born: April 6, 1936; Van Meter, Pennsylvania, U.S.
- Died: September 28, 2016 (aged 80); North Huntingdon, Pennsylvania, U.S.
- Batted: Both Threw: Right

Teams
- Rockford Peaches (1954)

Career highlights and awards
- Women in Baseball – AAGPBL Permanent Display at Baseball Hall of Fame and Museum (since 1988)

Wanita Dokish (April 6, 1936 – September 28, 2016) was an All-American Girls Professional Baseball League player. Listed at 5 feet 5 inches (1.65 m), 125 pounds (57 kg), she was a switch-hitter and threw right-handed.

Dokish joined the league in its last season of 1954 and did not have much of a chance to play.

Born in Van Meter, Pennsylvania, Dokish recalled playing baseball at six years of age. But it was not until she was 14 and enrolled at high school, where she had the opportunity to play organized softball.

Dokish attended an AAGPBL tryout at Battle Creek, Michigan, and signed a contract to play for the Rockford Peaches. She hit a single in her first at bat, but was used sparingly after her league debut.

In a 27-game career, Dokish posted a batting average of .113 (5-for-44) with two RBI and five runs scored.

After baseball, Dokish worked at the Westinghouse Electric Corporation based in Pennsylvania. She also continued playing softball until 1974, when she developed leg problems.

The AAGPBL folded in 1954, but there is a permanent display at the Baseball Hall of Fame and Museum at Cooperstown, New York, since November 5, 1988, that honors the entire league rather than any individual figure. Dokish was present during the ceremony.

Wanita Dokish died in 2016 in North Huntingdon, Pennsylvania, at the age of 80.

== Career statistics ==
Batting

GP	AB	R	H	2B	3B	HR	RBI	SB	TB	BB	SO	BA	OBP	SLG	OPS
27	44	5	5	0	0	0	2	0	5	10	14	.114	.278	.114	.391

Fielding

GP	PO	A	E	TC	DP	FA
24	50	28	11	89	6	.876
