= Battle of the Trough =

1756 skirmish in the French and Indian War

Coordinates: 39°13′25″N 78°51′27″W

- Part of the French and Indian War
Date	March or April, 1756
Location	South of "The Trough", near present-day Old Fields, Hardy County, West Virginia, USA
Result	Shawnee-Lenape victory

Belligerents
Shawnee and Lenape warriors	British America

Commanders and leaders
Killbuck	Unknown

Strength
14 or 60–70 (differing accounts)	16 or 18 (differing accounts)

Casualties and losses
3 dead (or many more); "several" wounded	7 dead, 3 wounded

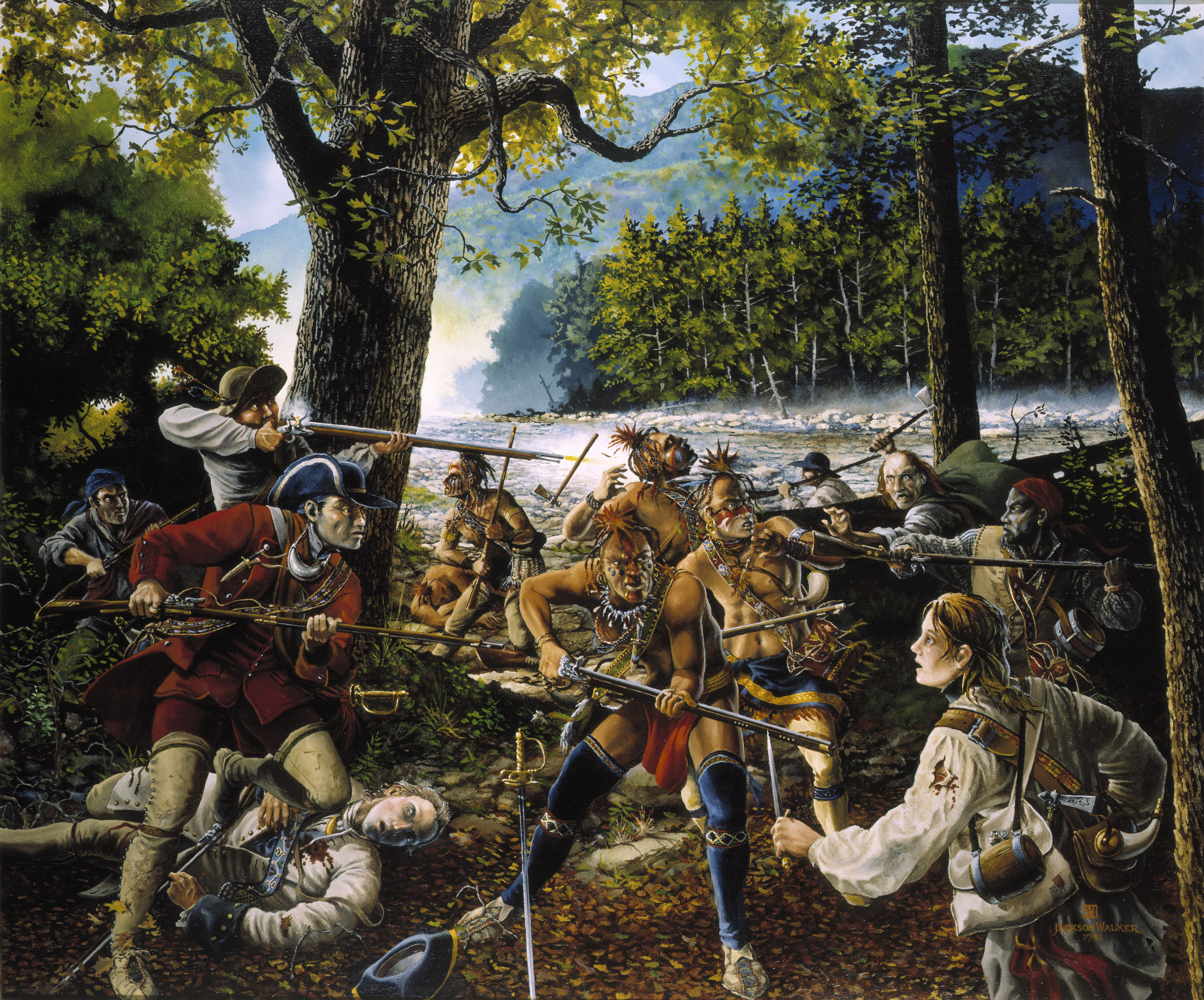
Twenty Brave Men by Jackson Walker

The Battle of the Trough (March or April 1756) was a skirmish of the early French and Indian War (1754–63) fought between Native Americans and Anglo-American settlers in the valley of the South Branch Potomac River in what is now northern Hardy County, West Virginia, USA.

== Background ==
After the defeat of General Edward Braddock at the Battle of the Monongahela (9 July 1755), the British settlers of the Allegheny Mountains were largely unprotected from a series of Shawnee and Lenape (Delaware) raids. In October, in an effort to provide some respite, two forts were raised in the South Branch Valley. By the end of the year, the Virginia Regiment had increased its numbers by several hundred troops and began to temporarily man some of these settler forts. Shortly after the new year, a new commander of the Regiment — the 24-year-old Colonel George Washington — ordered Captain Thomas Waggener to leave Fort Cumberland with his company and proceed up the South Branch. His orders directed him to construct two forts in the area above the rugged gorge known locally as "The Trough" and to station detachments accordingly to best protect the settlers on the upper South Branch.

That spring of 1756, a pair of Indians, a remnant of a party recently defeated (along with their French captain) by a Capt. Jeremiah Smith at the head of the Capon (Cacapon) River, were passing through the upper South Branch (somewhere near the present site of Cabins, West Virginia) when they encountered two settler women. One of these (a Mrs. Brake) they killed (tomahawked and scalped) outright and the other (a Mrs. Neff) they took prisoner. The party then proceeded to the vicinity of Fort Pleasant (at present day Old Fields and the lowermost of Waggener's two forts) where they encamped. That night Neff escaped and fled to the fort. (According to one version, the Indians deliberately allowed her to "escape" in order to draw the settlers out.)

== Battle ==
Mrs. Neff alerted the men at Fort Pleasant to the two Indians' presence and deeds, but what she could not know was that her captors had not been the only warriors in the area. Years later, the battle was described by a then-teenaged participant, James Parsons of Hampshire County:

[The Indians] ...divided into small squads and appointed a time and place of combining their force at a large spring at the lower end of the valley, a few miles below Fort Pleasant.... According to arrangement, a part of them made their appearance before that fort early in the morning and fired a few shots at the fort, and then marched off down the valley in full view.... Encouraged by the small number that made their appearance, spies were immediately sent out to ascertain if any other signs or trails could be discovered. They soon returned and reported that there was no other signs or trails, and that there could be plenty of men spared from the fort to follow and avenge the depredations recently committed by them. Immediate preparations were accordingly made for hot pursuit ...

That morning, 16 or 18 well-armed and mounted settlers moved out from the fort, and from Buttermilk Fort (Waggener's upper fort some five miles upstream), intending to attack the Indians. These men were said to be seasoned and tough Indian fighters. They soon dismounted and divided into two parties for a "pincer" approach and moved north behind the Indians into the rugged gorge known as "The Trough" for its steep and impassable slopes. Owing to a noisy dog, however, they soon completely lost the element of surprise. According to Parsons:

The Indian trail crossed the river about a mile above the said spring, at which the Indians had been in the habit of stopping and preparing something to eat on their passages up and down the valley. Here the whites expected to overtake them.... Soon after crossing the river their smoke was discovered, but in place of taking their repast at the spring, as usual, they had advanced up to the head of a small branch entering into the Potomac immediately below the spring. A point projected down to the bottom on each side of this branch; the right hand point being somewhat easiest of ascent, the whites concluded to ascend that point to bring on the battle. The Indians, expecting to be followed, had their spies out, and as soon as it was discovered which point the whites took, a part of the Indians slipped down the other point and got in the rear of the whites without their being aware of this movement.

The Indians, who (according to one account) were now revealed to be a party of some 60 or 70 warriors under the Lenape chief Killbuck, had managed to get between them and their horses. The settlers were now pinned between a steep mountainside (to the east) and the flood-swollen river (to the west).

The battle soon commenced, and raged with great fury for some time on both sides, but the whites found that they were outgeneraled as well as largely outnumbered; they were soon beat back and compelled to force their way through the enemy in their rear. In doing so, many lost their lives and many were wounded. Those that succeeded in breaking through, had each to shift for himself — some plunged into the river, which was not far from the spring; some took up the bottom, on the route they had pursued the Indians.

The Indians had initiated a one- to two-hour firefight which resulted in seven dead and four wounded settlers. The Indian casualties were three dead and "several" wounded. The horses went to the natives and the surviving settlers made good a withdrawal back to Fort Pleasant where they were immediately put on duty defending the fort and remained vigilant all the next night.

== Aftermath ==
This encounter became known locally as the "Battle of the Trough" and was detailed to the author Samuel Kercheval when he visited the area in 1830. According to one account, at the time of the fight a company of British regulars were quartered at Fort Pleasant under the command of Capt. Waggener who had overseen the building of the fort shortly before. Waggener supposedly refused to come to the aid of the besieged settlers, a mere mile and a half away. Adding insult to injury, this account further relates that Waggener, after being called a coward, had several of the survivors of the fight pursued and whipped.

The next encounter between Killbuck and the settlers in the South Branch Valley was the ambush known as the Battle of Great Cacapon (April 18, 1756), another disaster for the settlers. Strong emotions long ran high among the settlers after this time of extreme vulnerability and brutal violence. But in later years, after the Indians were long gone, many locals became more reflective and thoughtful. Felix Renick, who recorded and published Parsons' account, was one:

I was well acquainted with the battle ground, having lived from my birth to the age of thirty years within three miles of it; have often viewed it and admired the sagacity of the Indians in its selection, and wondered at the imprudence of the whites in going into battle on such unequal terms.... This instance ... has sometimes almost led me to the conclusion that the whites have often been impelled by an influence that they were not aware of, to rush into conflict at such great odds, that they might be punished or scourged for the great injustice done the red people. In my youth I was ready to sanction almost everything done to them by the whites; but a mature age, with much reflection on the subject, has convinced me of my former error; and now, taking an impartial view of the past, I fear we have a great debt on this score that must at some time and in some fearful way be cancelled, unless we make them proper amends.
