= Van Meteren =

Van Meteren is a Flemish surname. Notable people with this surname include:

- Emanuel van Meteren (1535–1612), Flemish historian
- Jacobus van Meteren (1519-1555), printer of early English versions of the Bible

== See also ==
- Van Meter
