= Judge J. W. F. Allen House =

Historic house in West Virginia, United States

- U.S. National Register of Historic Places
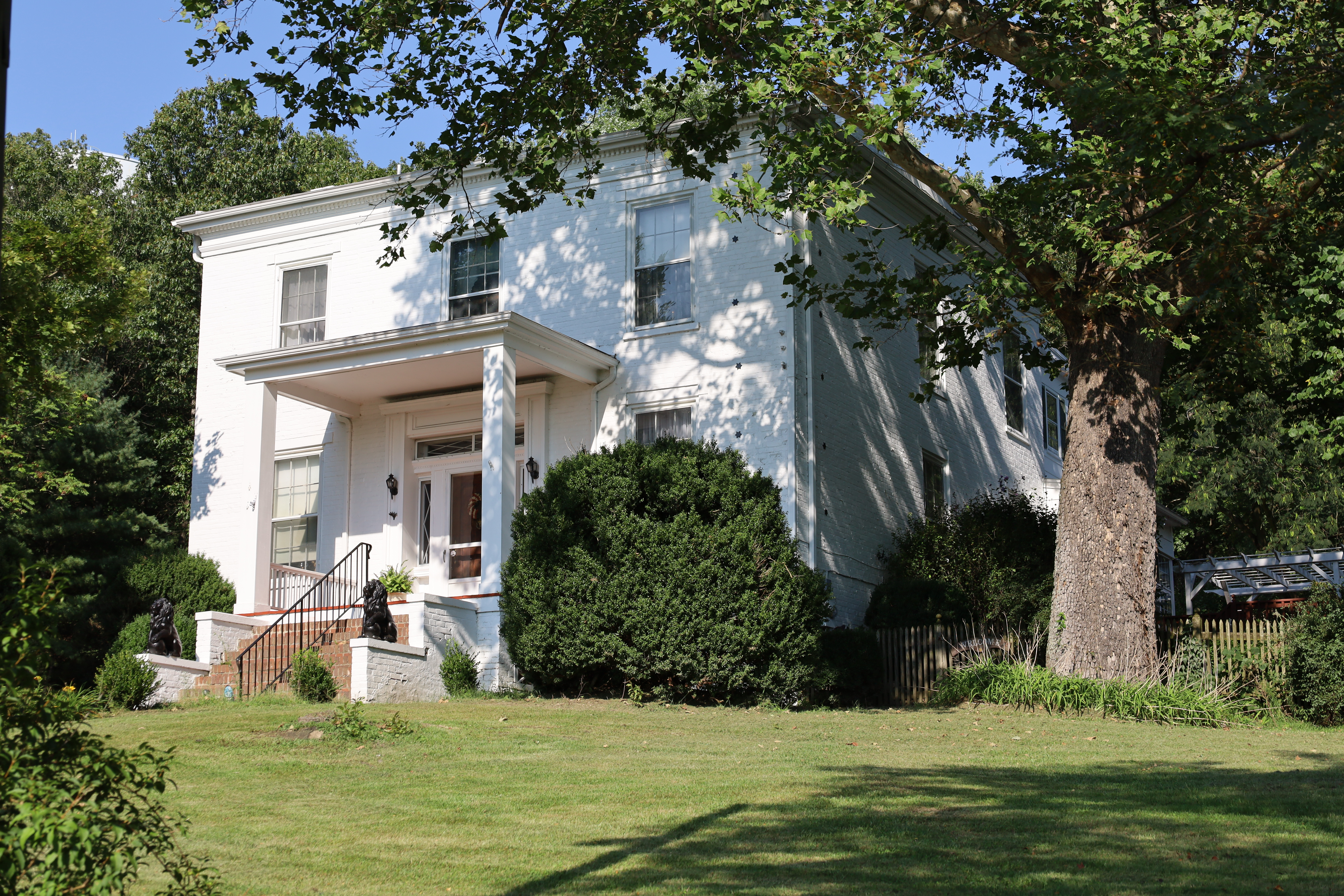

- Location within Eastern Panhandle of West Virginia Location within West Virginia Location within the United States
- Location: South Fork Rd., Moorefield, West Virginia
- Coordinates: 39°3′24″N 78°57′42″W
- Area: 4 acres (1.6 ha)
- Built: 1842
- Architectural style: Greek Revival
- MPS: South Branch Valley MRA
- NRHP reference No.: 83003237
- Added to NRHP: February 10, 1983

Judge J. W. F. Allen House, also known as "Ingleside," is a historic home located near Moorefield, Hardy County, West Virginia. It was built in 1842, and is a two-story brick dwelling in the Greek Revival style. It features eight foot high windows. The interior features a semi-circular staircase. A two-story rear addition was built in the 1960s.

It was listed on the National Register of Historic Places in 1983.
