= Oakland Hall =

Historic house in West Virginia, United States

- U.S. National Register of Historic Places
- Location within Eastern Panhandle of West Virginia Location within West Virginia Location within the United States
- Location: U.S. Route 220, near Moorefield, West Virginia
- Coordinates: 39°0′26″N 79°0′12″W
- Area: 0.5 acres (0.20 ha)
- Built: 1850
- Architect: Will Engeman
- Architectural style: Greek Revival
- MPS: South Branch Valley MRA
- NRHP reference No.: 85001598
- Added to NRHP: July 10, 1985

Oakland Hall is a historic home located near Moorefield, Hardy County, West Virginia. It was built about 1850, and is a Greek Revival style dwelling. It is the clubhouse for the Valley View Golf Club.

It was listed on the National Register of Historic Places in 1985.
