= Marjorie Pierce =

American architect

Marjorie Pierce (1900 – December 7, 1999) was an American architect whose practice centered in Massachusetts.

== Biography ==
Marjorie Pierce was born in Malden, Massachusetts. She received both her bachelor's degree (1922) and master's degree (1923) in architecture from the Massachusetts Institute of Technology. In her final undergraduate year, she won the Special Prize for Water Colors. She went on to study art and architecture abroad on a fellowship from the Boston Society of Architecture.

In a career spanning nearly 70 years, Pierce worked mainly in Massachusetts, designing hundreds of residences and commercial buildings out of an office in Weston. She donated 80 rolls of her architectural drawings to the MIT Museum.

Pierce strongly supported architectural education at her alma mater, serving as president of the MIT Women's Association (1940–44) and endowing the Ellen Swallow Richards Professorship and the William Emerson Fellowship for graduate students.

When she died in late 1999, she was MIT's oldest living alumna. An MIT student residence was named the Marjorie Pierce House in her honor.

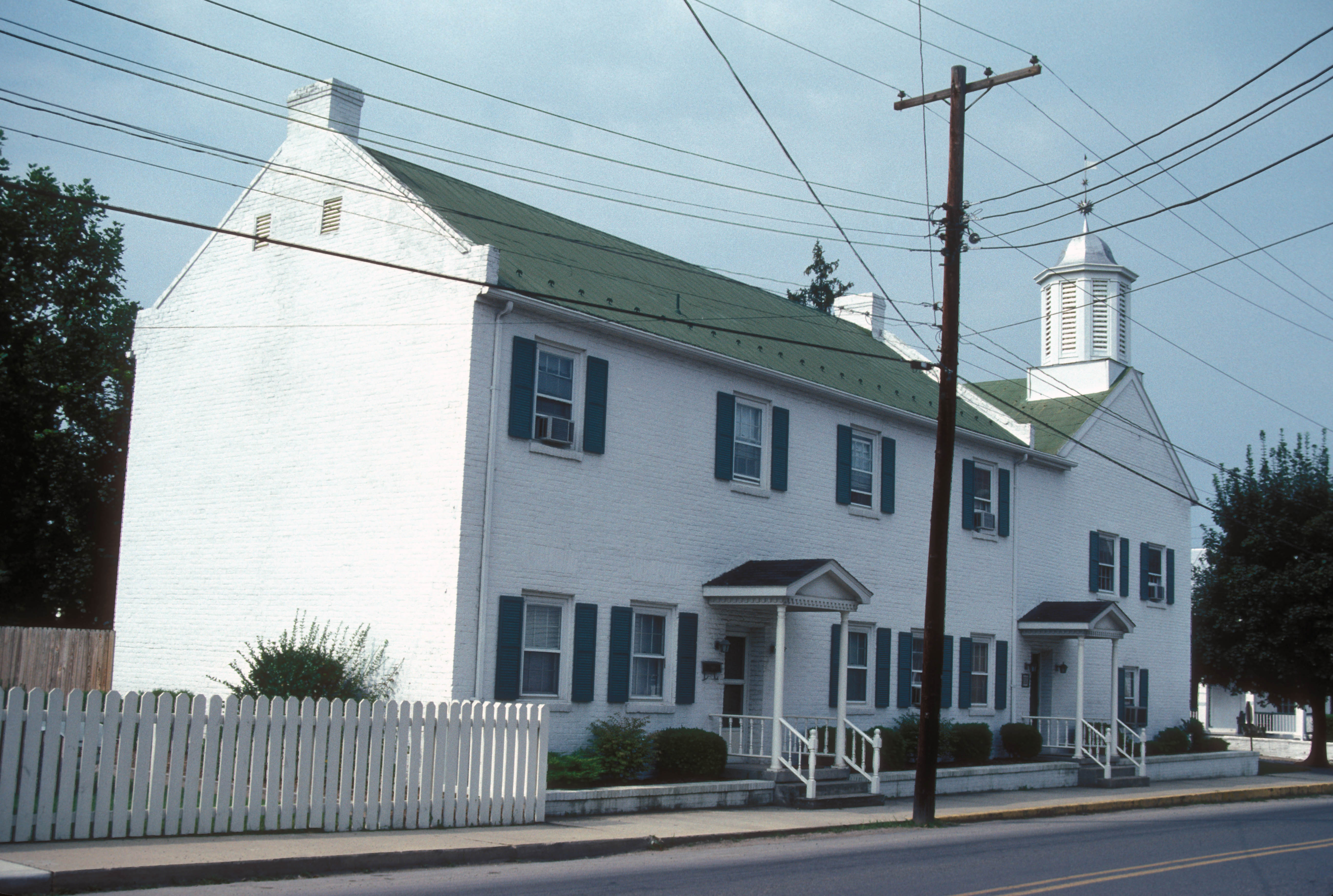
Old Hardy County Courthouse

== Selected buildings ==
- Lexington Arts and Crafts Society, Massachusetts — headquarters (1953)
- 42 Summer St., Weston, Massachusetts — addition to Colonial Revival house originally designed by Ida Annah Ryan (1961)
- Old Hardy County Courthouse, Moorefield, West Virginia — remodel (1972)
