= Moorefield Historic District =

Historic house in West Virginia, United States

- U.S. National Register of Historic Places
- U.S. Historic district
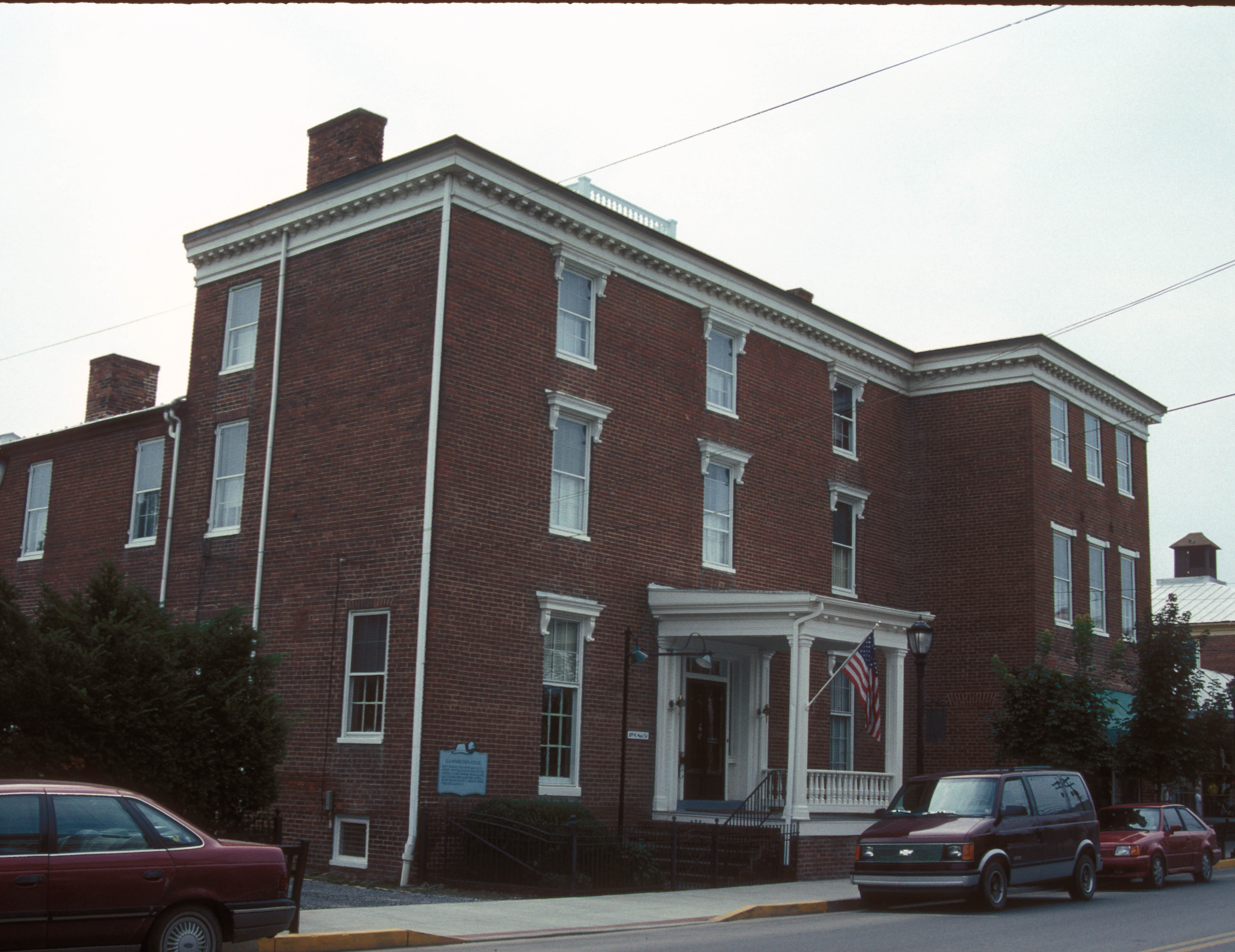

- Location within Eastern Panhandle of West Virginia Location within West Virginia Location within the United States
- Location: Portions of Main, Elm, Washington, and Winchester Sts., Moorefield, West Virginia
- Coordinates: 39°3′35″N 78°58′12″W
- Area: 70 acres (28 ha)
- Built: 1777
- Architectural style: Greek Revival, Queen Anne, Italianate
- MPS: South Branch Valley MRA
- NRHP reference No.: 86000774
- Added to NRHP: January 15, 1986

Moorefield Historic District is a national historic district located at Moorefield, Hardy County, West Virginia. The district encompasses 171 contributing buildings. It consists of a mix of commercial, residential and civic structures, ranging in age from the mid 18th century to the early 20th century. Predominate residential styles are Greek Revival and Queen Anne. The commercial buildings are Italianate style. Notable buildings include the Hardy County Court House (1914), City Hall, and Emmanuel Episcopal Church (1879). Located in the district are the separately listed Old Stone Tavern, Thomas Maslin House, and Old Hardy County Courthouse.

It was listed on the National Register of Historic Places in 1986.
