= Stump Family Farm =

Historic house in West Virginia, United States

- U.S. National Register of Historic Places
- U.S. Historic district
- Location within Eastern Panhandle of West Virginia Location within West Virginia Location within the United States
- Location: WV 7, southern fork of the Potomac River, near Moorefield, West Virginia
- Coordinates: 38°54′31″N 79°1′10″W
- Area: 100.6 acres (40.7 ha)
- Built: 1775
- Architectural style: Single pen
- NRHP reference No.: 98001471
- Added to NRHP: December 15, 1998

Stump Family Farm is a national historic district located near Moorefield, Hardy County, West Virginia. The district encompasses three contributing buildings and one contributing site. It includes a cabin constructed of rough hewn white oak with a top log of pine, built about 1775. Also on the property is a barn (c. 1810), well house (c. 1810), and the Stump family cemetery. The property commemorates pre-revolutionary pioneer life in America. Michael Stump purchased the property about 1781 and it remained in the family until 1972.

The site was added to the National Register of Historic Places in 1998.
