= Old Hardy County Courthouse =

- U.S. National Register of Historic Places
- U.S. Historic district – Contributing property
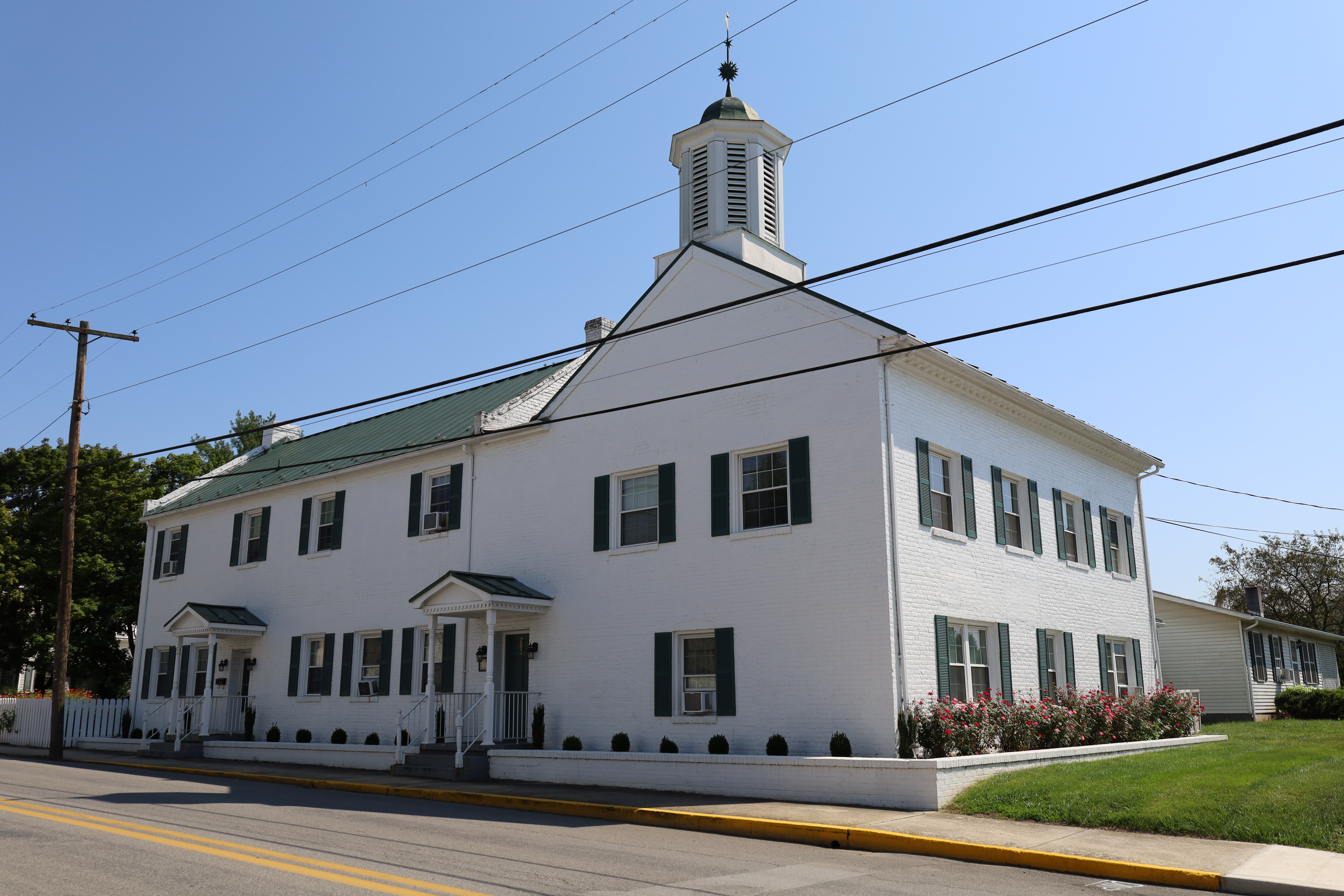
- The building in 2020

- Location within Eastern Panhandle of West Virginia Location within West Virginia Location within the United States
- Location: Winchester Ave. and Elm St., Moorefield, West Virginia
- Coordinates: 39°3′43″N 78°58′5″W
- Area: 0.5 acres (0.20 ha)
- Built: 1793, c. 1833
- Architectural style: Federal
- Part of: Moorefield Historic District (ID86000774)
- NRHP reference No.: 74002002

Significant dates
- Added to NRHP: October 9, 1974
- Designated CP: January 15, 1986

Old Hardy County Courthouse, also known as "First" Hardy County Courthouse, is a historic courthouse building located at Moorefield, Hardy County, West Virginia. It was built in two sections, the first built in 1792-93 and the extension added about 1833. It is an L-shaped brick building painted white. The original section measures approximately 25 by 50 feet (7.6 by 15.2 m) and the 1833 extension 50 by 25 feet (15.2 by 7.6 m). The original section has Federal style detailing and features a cupola atop the gable roof. The building was remodeled in 1972. It served as the courthouse and clerk's office until the 1860s. It was subsequently occupied by a girls' day and boarding school and offices.

Following a remodel by architect Marjorie Pierce in 1972, it was listed on the National Register of Historic Places in 1974.
