= P.W. Inskeep House =

Historic house in West Virginia, United States

- P. W. Inskeep House
- U.S. National Register of Historic Places
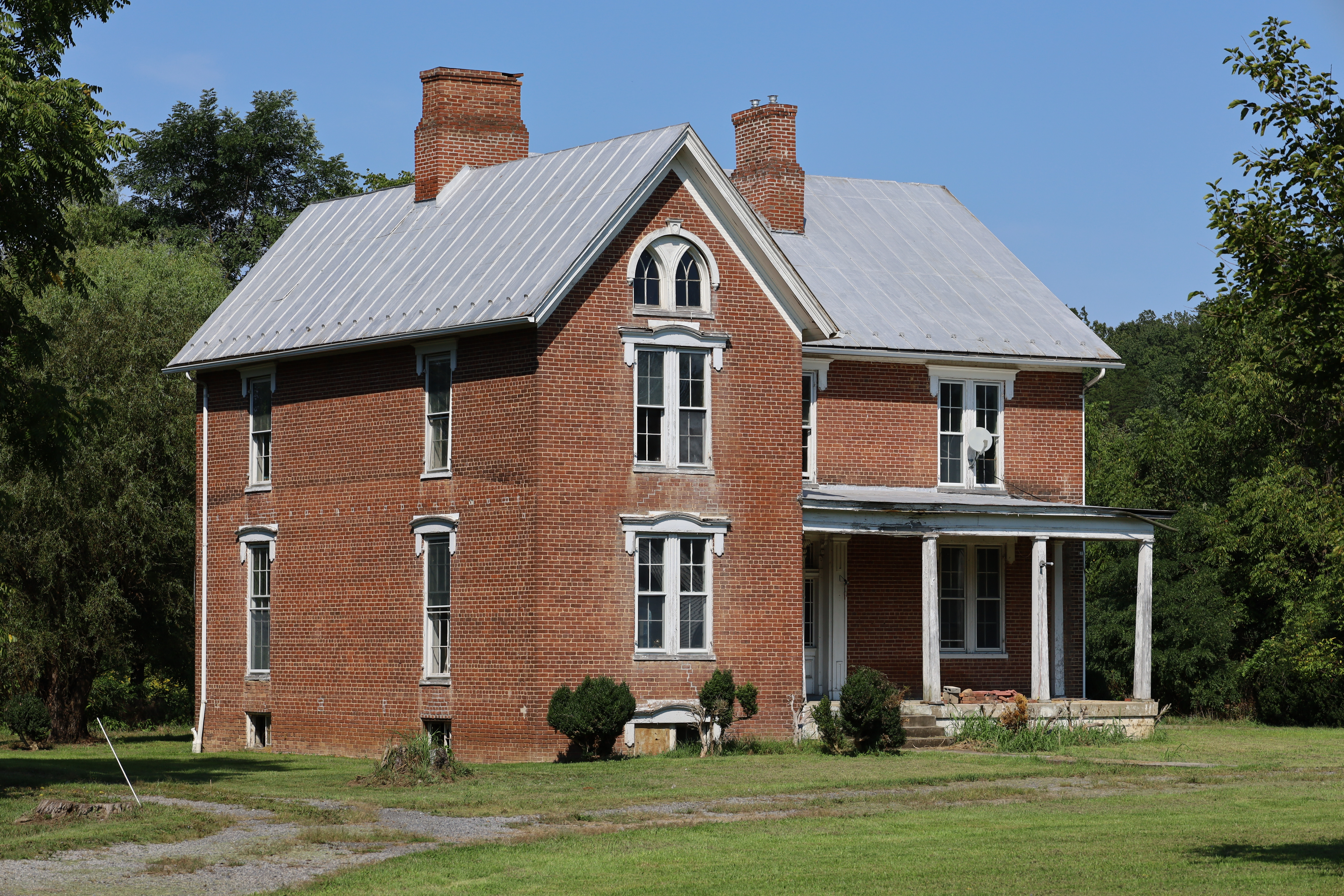

- Location within Eastern Panhandle of West Virginia Location within West Virginia Location within the United States
- Location: W.VA 55, near Moorefield, West Virginia
- Coordinates: 39°4′13″N 78°57′25″W
- Area: 2 acres (0.81 ha)
- Built: 1876
- Architectural style: Greek Revival, Gothic Revival
- MPS: South Branch Valley MRA
- NRHP reference No.: 85001597
- Added to NRHP: July 10, 1985

P. W. Inskeep House is a historic home located near Moorefield, Hardy County, West Virginia. It was built in 1876, and is a two-story brick dwelling with a combination of Greek Revival and Gothic Revival styles. Also on the property is a contributing shed / garage.

It was listed on the National Register of Historic Places in 1985.
