= Old Stone Tavern (Moorefield, West Virginia) =

Historic house in West Virginia, United States

- U.S. National Register of Historic Places
- U.S. Historic district – Contributing property
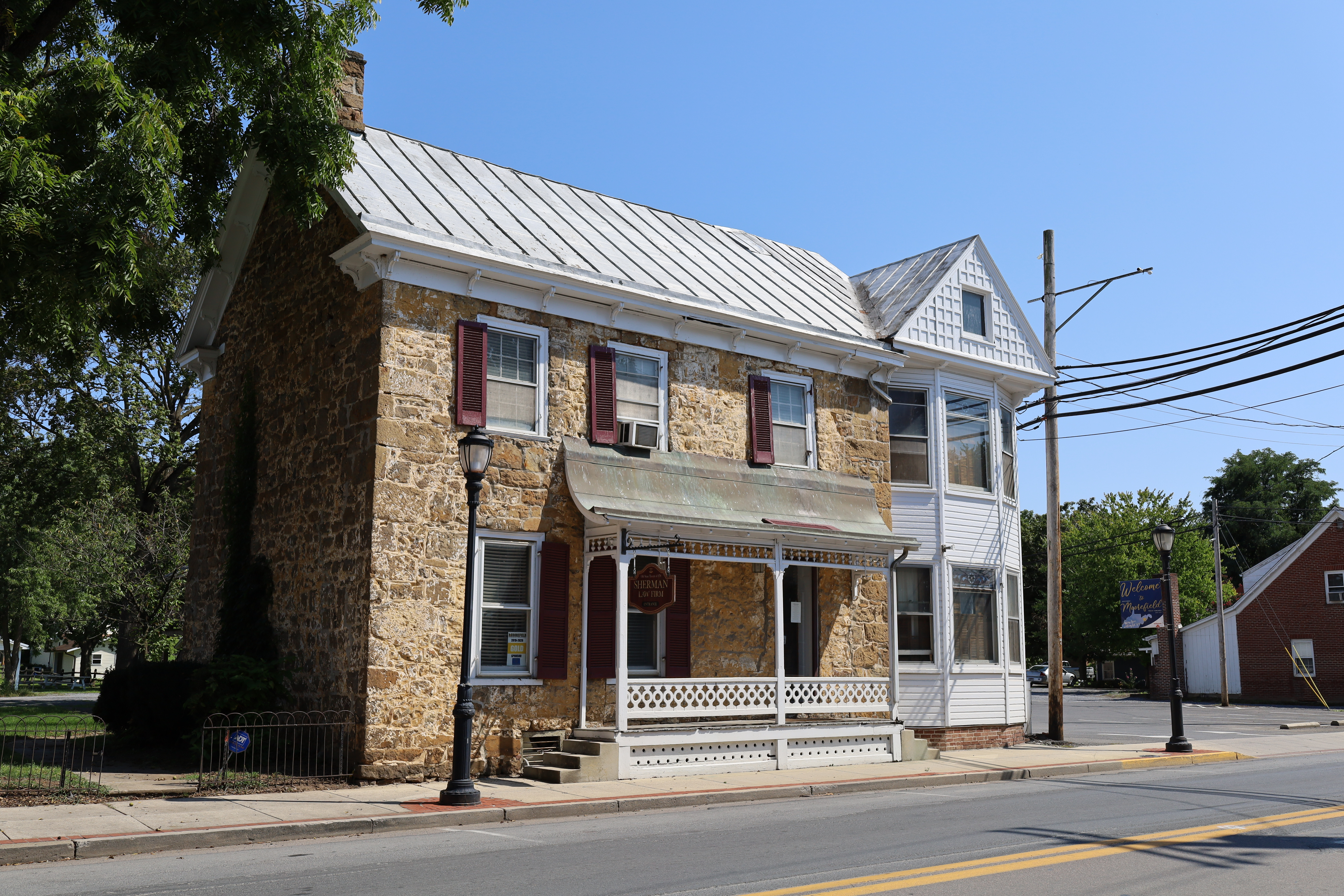

- Location within Eastern Panhandle of West Virginia Location within West Virginia Location within the United States
- Location: 117 Main St., Moorefield, West Virginia
- Coordinates: 39°3′40″N 78°58′11″W
- Area: 0.3 acres (0.12 ha)
- Built: 1788
- Part of: Moorefield Historic District (ID86000774)
- NRHP reference No.: 79002579

Significant dates
- Added to NRHP: December 10, 1979
- Designated CP: January 15, 1986

Old Stone Tavern is a historic home and tavern located at Moorefield, Hardy County, West Virginia. The original fieldstone section was built in 1788. Attached to it are three frame sections added about 1840, 1860, and 1900, and a cinder block apartment built in the 1950s. It features a front porch. It was built by early resident Thomas Parsons and is one of the earliest buildings in Moorefield.

It was listed on the National Register of Historic Places in 1979.
