= Thomas Maslin House =

Historic house in West Virginia, United States

- U.S. National Register of Historic Places
- U.S. Historic district – Contributing property
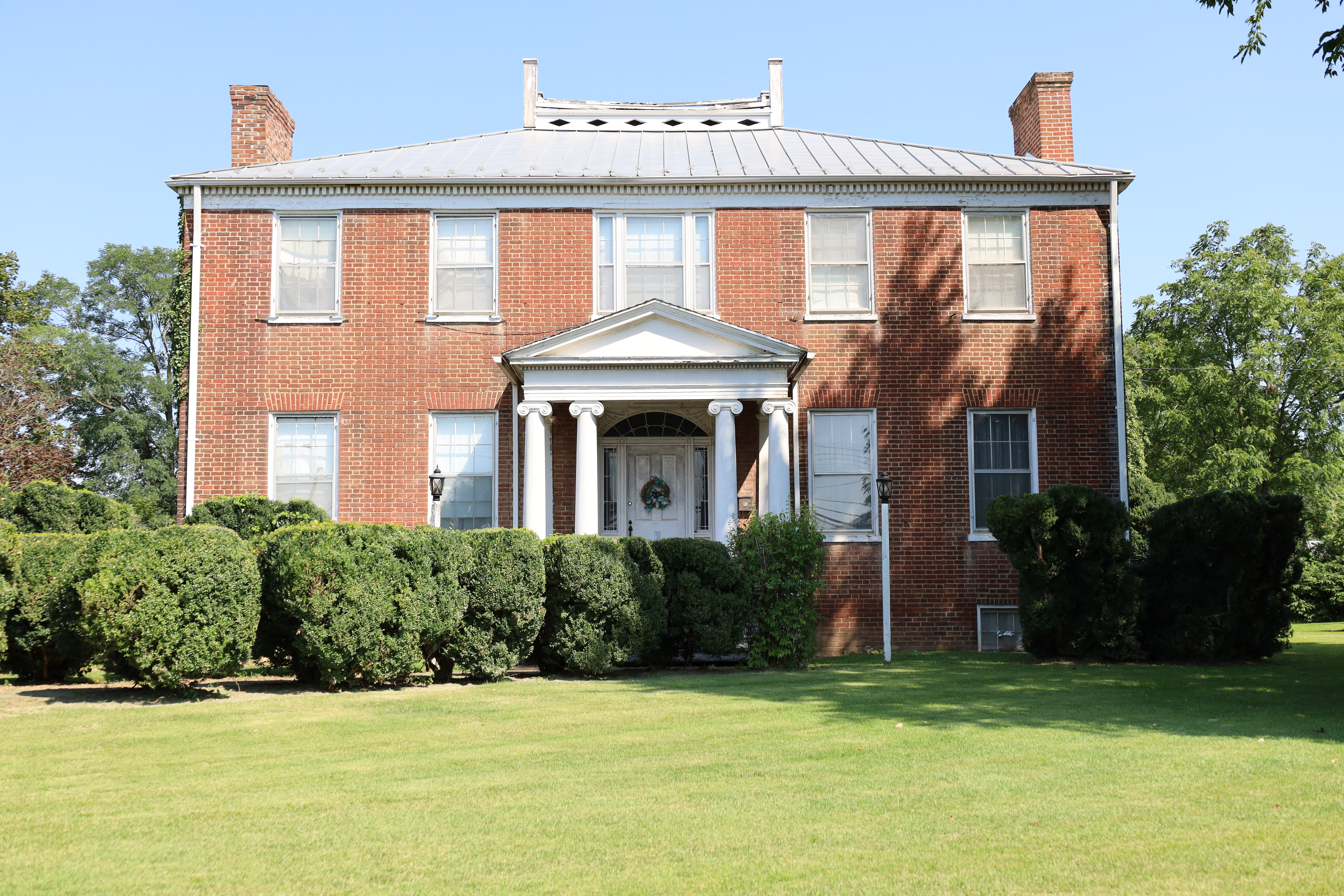
- The house in 2020

- Location within Eastern Panhandle of West Virginia Location within West Virginia Location within the United States
- Location: 131 Main St., Moorefield, West Virginia
- Coordinates: 39°3′36″N 78°58′9″W
- Area: 1.5 acres (0.61 ha)
- Built: 1848
- Architectural style: Federal, Federal vernacular
- Part of: Moorefield Historic District (ID86000774)
- NRHP reference No.: 79002578

Significant dates
- Added to NRHP: August 29, 1979
- Designated CP: January 15, 1986

Thomas Maslin House, also known as Mortimer Gamble House and Maslin-Gamble House, is a historic home located at Moorefield, Hardy County, West Virginia. It was built in 1848, and is a two-story brick dwelling with a vernacular Federal style. It features a single-bay, pedimented portico supported by paired Ionic order columns. Above the four panel entrance is a semi-elliptical fanlight. Also on the property is a contributing two story, brick servant's quarters.

It was listed on the National Register of Historic Places in 1979.
