= Florence V. Brittingham =

American poet

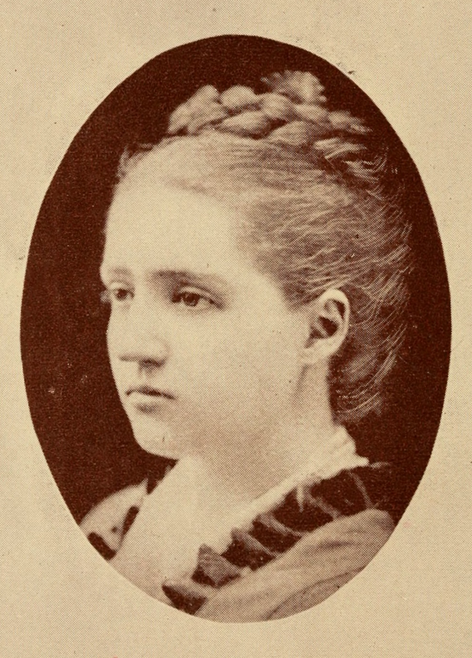
- Born: Florence Virginia Shearer; November 15, 1856; Moorefield, Virginia, U.S.A.
- Died: April 26, 1891 (aged 34); Wheeling, West Virginia, U.S.
- Education: Eclectic Institute
- Occupation: writer
- Spouse: Jacob Brittingham (m. 1882)
- Children: Philip Shearer Brittingham
- Writing career
- Language: English
- Genres: poetry; short stories
- Notable works: Verse and Story

Signature
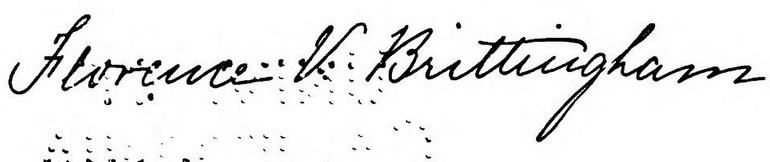

Florence V. Brittingham (née, Shearer; November 15, 1856 – April 26, 1891) was an American poet and short story writer. She met with some success in writing for various periodicals, though she was quite occupied with helping her husband in his pastoral work and the pressing duties of home life to focus on her literary efforts. Verse and Story (1892), published after her death, contained some of her poems and six short stories. At St. Luke's Episcopal Church, Wheeling, West Virginia, she founded a Woman's Auxiliary organization, the first of its kind in the city.

== Early life and education ==
Florence Virginia Shearer was born in Moorefield, Virginia (in an area that later became West Virginia) on November 15, 1856. Her parents were Philip G. and Susan M. Shearer. Brittingham was the eldest of five children. Her father, born in Winchester, Virginia, was of well-connected German and English ancestry. Her mother was born near Moorefield. Susan's maiden name was Harness, a family well known from the earliest settlement of the South-Branch Valley.

There is little to record of Brittingham's childhood. In the fall of 1871, when nearly fourteen years of age, Brittingham was entered as a pupil in the Eclectic Institute, Baltimore, Maryland, where she remained for three years under the care and tuition of Letitia Tyler Semple, the principal. Here she remained three years, when, having finished the course with high honors, she returned to her valley home.

While at school in Baltimore, Brittingham attended Emmanuel Church, under charge of Bishop Alfred Magill Randolph, of Virginia. She was presented by him for confirmation during her last year at school. In 1874, she returned to Moorefield, remaining until her marriage in 1882.

== Career ==
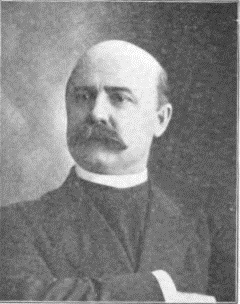
Rev. Jacob Brittingham (1902)

On September 5, 1882, she wed the Rev. Jacob Brittingham, a Presbyter of the Diocese of West Virginia, having charge of various churches and missions in the neighborhood of Parkersburg, West Virginia. He was a resident of the home of Rev. George William Peterkin of that city, and here the couple lived for about a year. While in Parkersburg, she was a very active member of the congregation. In the Sunday School, the Industrial Mission School and the Mother's Mission, she found room for work. She added the work of a Bible class for young men which afterwards developed into a large class of both sexes—married or single. In addition to church work and Bible-teaching, she also instructed a class of young women in English literature and French. The dates of Brittingham poems show that her literary activity begun while living in the Peterkin house thought the Peterkins were not aware at the time that Brittingham was doing such work.

Next, the Rev. Brittingham was transferred to Clarksburg, West Virginia, having been placed in charge of Christ Church and they remained in Clarksburg for six years. In addition to the care of her home and infant son, she had charge of the church choir, for which she was organist, and conducted an afternoon Bible class every Sunday. She also worked in the mission school, and taught classes in French and literature. Naturally self-reliant, she had after graduation, preferred to make her own pocket and church money by teaching and other work. The experience she thus gained was invaluable to her in her married life, managing her household affairs with due regard to a limited salary paid her husband by the church in Clarksburg.

Her literary work, which she quietly carried on during this period, was her avocation—her recreation. Some of her poems and short stories written at that time were published in different papers and periodicals, but the greater number were published by her husband, since her death, in the volume entitled Verse and Story (Buffalo, 1892).

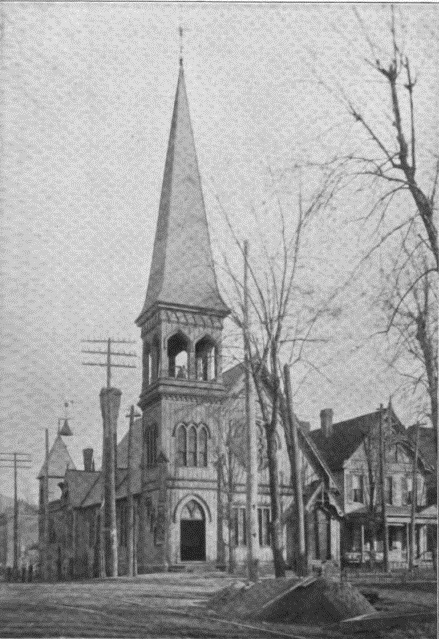
St. Luke's Episcopal Church, Wheeling, West Virginia

In 1889, Rev. Brittingham moved to St. Luke's Church, Wheeling, West Virginia. By her indefatigable industry, she made it possible to furnish for the most part the church's rectory, and to put it in comfortable condition. Her idea was to make it “parish-worthy” to use her own words. In St. Luke's parish, she organized a circle of King's Daughters, and also had a Bible class for young women which met at the rectory every Saturday night.

She organized a branch of the Woman's Auxiliary in Clarksburg, certainly among the first in the Dioceses. In St. Luke's, Wheeling, she effected such an organization, the first of its kind in the city.

== Later life and death ==
When Brittingham became sick, it was thought that she might be entering upon an attack of the prevalent grippe. It turned out to be the beginning of the typhoid fever, from which, after 39 days, she died, on April 26, 1891, at St. Luke's rectory, in Wheeling. Brittingham was survived by her husband and son. Her brother, Dr. Philip T. Shearer, who was Health Officer of the City of Wheeling, died of the same disease six weeks later.

== Selected works ==
- Verse and Story (1892)
