= Westfall Place =

Historic house in West Virginia, United States

- U.S. National Register of Historic Places
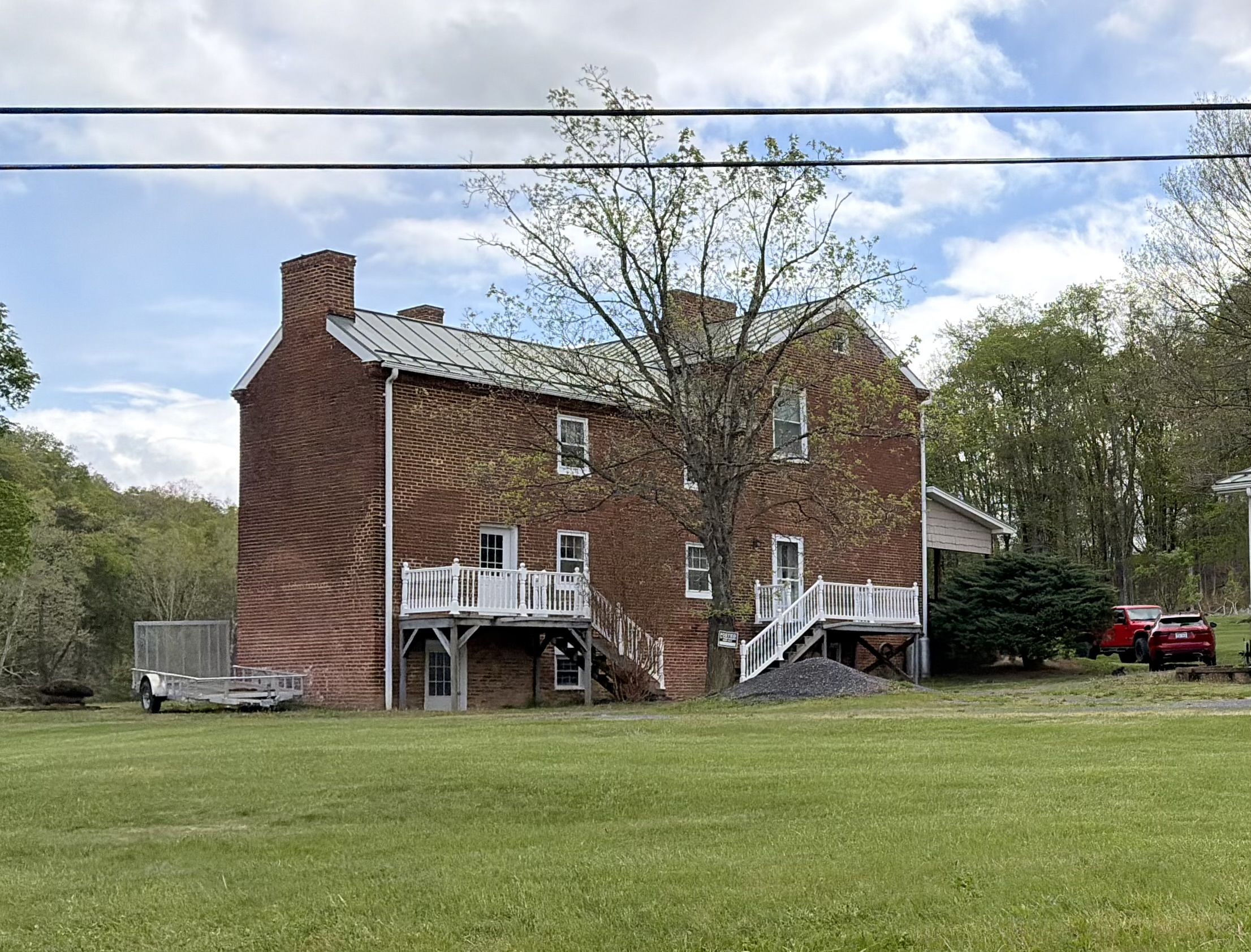
- Westfall Place in 2026

- Location within Eastern Panhandle of West Virginia Location within West Virginia Location within the United States
- Location: U.S. Route 220, near Moorefield, West Virginia
- Coordinates: 39°1′1″N 79°0′3″W
- Area: 2.3 acres (0.93 ha)
- Built: c. 1860
- Architectural style: Greek Revival
- MPS: South Branch Valley MRA
- NRHP reference No.: 85001599
- Added to NRHP: July 10, 1985

Westfall Place is a historic home located near Moorefield, Hardy County, West Virginia. It was built around 1860, and is a two-story brick dwelling in the Greek Revival style. It features a temple form entrance portico.

It was listed on the National Register of Historic Places in 1985.
