= Anna Van Meter =

American clinical psychologist

- Education: University of North Carolina at Chapel Hill
- Scientific career
- Fields: Clinical psychology
- Workplaces: Yeshiva University; Hofstra University

Anna Van Meter is an American clinical psychologist. She is on the faculty of New York University Grossman School of Medicine in the Department of Child and Adolescent Psychiatry. She leads the Investigating Mood Pathology: Assessment, Course, Treatment (IMPACT) Lab. Van Meter and her team conduct research on mood disorders and associated clinical phenomena, including suicide. They focus on innovative, technology-based approaches to improve the rapid identification of symptoms in youth and to facilitate access to evidence-based care.

== Education and degrees ==
Anna Van Meter, Ph.D. graduated cum laude from Dartmouth College. She majored in Psychology and minored in Women's Studies. She earned her Master of Arts in clinical psychology and her doctorate in clinical psychology with an emphasis in quantitative psychology from the University of North Carolina at Chapel Hill. She completed her clinical internship at the University of Illinois at Chicago.

== Positions and roles ==
Van Meter is currently on the faculty of NYU Grossman School of Medicine in the Department of Child and Adolescent Psychiatry. She was on the faculty of Yeshiva University in the Ferkauf Graduate School of Psychology from 2013 to 2017. In 2018, she joined the faculty at the Feinstein Institutes for Medical Research of Northwell Health and Donald and Barbara Zucker School of Medicine at Hofstra/Northwell. Although she joined NYU in 2022, she remains affiliated with Northwell Health and the Zucker School of Medicine.

== Research ==
Van Meter has authored over 60 peer-reviewed publications and has given more than 50 national and international talks on topics including bipolar spectrum disorders, evidence-based assessment, and digital psychiatry. She is an author on more than 100 conference abstracts. Her most cited work is a 2011 meta-analysis of the prevalence of bipolar disorder in youth (updated in 2019), which helped to establish that bipolar disorder affects youth and that its prevalence has been consistent over time around the world. She is also the lead author on a meta-analysis of the symptoms of the prodrome to bipolar disorder, which provided a foundation for work by her and others aiming to predict the risk of onset of bipolar disorder. Van Meter is the recipient of a K23 career development award from the National Institute of Mental Health to study the digital phenotype of bipolar disorder in youth. The aims of this study include determining whether data collected from adolescents' smartphone sensors can help to predict relapse in those with bipolar disorder and identifying differences in the digital phenotypes of typically developing adolescents and those with bipolar disorder.

Van Meter also has several publications related to suicide, including an international meta-analysis of the prevalence of suicidal thoughts and behaviors in youth, and a paper describing how Google search data may have potential as a way by which to identify suicide risk. She has a NARSAD Young Investigator Award from the Brain and Behavior Research Foundation to study the digital phenotype of proximal risk for suicide in youth. This study aims to evaluate whether keyboard metadata, along with other smartphone sensor data, can help identify youth at imminent risk for suicidal behaviors.

Van Meter is interested in how technology can help facilitate access to evidence-based care for youth, especially those in under-served communities. She has led multiple RCTs of technology-based interventions. She demonstrated preliminary efficacy for computer-based interpretation bias training as a way by which to improve social functioning and mood in young people with bipolar disorder. Additionally, she recently completed a trial of an online peer support community for adolescents to test the feasibility and safety of such a community. She also conducted a study using blue-light blocking glasses to improve sleep quality and mental health outcomes among college students.

Van Meter has published multiple papers on the process of evidence-based assessment and on the diagnostic efficiency of commonly used assessment tools. These papers guide readers through the process of evidence-based assessment and are intended to facilitate early identification and appropriate treatment for youth with mental health problems. She is active in Helping Give Away Psychological Science (HGAPS), a 501(c)3, focused on disseminating information to promote well-being in the community. Much of her work with HGAPS has involved updating Wikipedia pages for symptom measures to make these tools easily accessible.

== Service ==
Van Meter serves as the President of HGAPS, a non-profit service organization. She is also on the Council for the American Psychopathological Association. Van Meter conducts pro bono psychological evaluations for people seeking asylum through the Weill Cornell Center for Human Rights. She previously served as Secretary on the board of directors for the Society for Clinical Child and Adolescent Psychology and as co-president for the Bipolar Disorders Special Interest Group of the Association for Behavioral and Cognitive Therapies.

== Clinical work ==
Van Meter is trained in cognitive behavior therapy and dialectical behavioral therapy. In her clinical work, she specializes in evidence-based assessment and diagnosis and in the treatment of mood and anxiety disorders. She sees patients through the Faculty Group Practice at New York University Langone Health.

== Honors and awards ==
Van Meter is the recipient of numerous honors and awards, including the following.

Honors and Awards
Award Title	Organization	Year
Clinical and Translational Science Institute K to Independence Program	NYU Langone Health	2022
Advancing Women in Science and Medicine Educational Advancement Award	The Feinstein Institutes for Medical Research	2021
NARSAD Young Investigator Award	Brain and Behavior Research Foundation	2021
K23 Career Development Award K23MH120505	National Institute of Mental Health	2019
Barbara Zucker Early Faculty Career Award	The Feinstein Institutes for Medical Research	2019
Travel Award	American College of Neuropsychopharmacology	2018
Travel Award	American Academy of Child and Adolescent Psychiatry	2018
Abidin Early Career Award	Society for Clinical Child and Adolescent Psychology	2018
Rising Star	Association for Psychological Science	2018
John and Polly Sparks Foundation Early Career Grant	American Psychological Foundation	2017
Visionary Grant	American Psychological Foundation	2016
Hollander Seed Grant	The Hollander Foundation	2016
Kavli Summer Institute in Cognitive Neuroscience	The National Institute of Mental Health, the National Institute on Drug Abuse, and the Kalvi Foundation	2016
Career Development Institute for Bipolar Disorder	The National Institute of Mental Health and the University of Pittsburgh	2015
Clinical Scientist Training Initiative Grant	Society for a Science of Clinical Psychology	2014
Institute of Clinical and Translational Research Grant	Einstein-Montefiore Institute of Clinical and Translational Research	2014
Child Intervention, Prevention and Services (CHIPS) Fellowship	National Institute of Mental Health	2014
Translational Research Pilot Grant	North Carolina Translational and Clinical Services Institute	2011
Future Faculty Fellowship	University of North Carolina Center for Faculty Excellence]	2011
Travel Award	International Review of Bipolar Disorders	2011

== Selected publications ==
Below are Van Meter's most cited publications out of more than 80 papers and chapters.

Selected Publications
Title	Journal	Year !
Meta-analysis of epidemiologic studies of pediatric bipolar disorder	The Journal of Clinical Psychiatry	2011
Cyclothymic disorder: a critical review	Clinical Psychology Review	2012
Clinical decision making about child and adolescent anxiety disorders using the Achenbach system of empirically based assessment	Journal of Clinical Child & Adolescent Psychology	2014
Multivariate meta-analysis of the discriminative validity of caregiver, youth, and teacher rating scales for pediatric bipolar disorder: Mother knows base about mania.	Archives of Scientific Psychology	2015
Ten-year updated meta-analysis of the clinical characteristics of pediatric mania and hypomania	Bipolar Disorders	2016
Empirically supported assessment of children and adolescents	Clinical Psychology: Science and Practice	2016
The bipolar prodrome: meta-analysis of symptom prevalence prior to initial or recurrent mood episodes	Journal of the American Academy of Child & Adolescent Psychiatry	2016
Examining the validity of cyclothymic disorder in a youth sample	Journal of Affective Disorders	2011
Cyclothymic Disorder	The Encyclopedia of Clinical Psychology	2015
T he International Society for Bipolar Disorders Task Force report on pediatric bipolar disorder: Knowledge to date and directions for future research	Bipolar Disorders	2017
Evidence-based assessment as an integrative model for applying psychological science to guide the voyage of treatment	Clinical Psychology: Science and Practice	2017
Review and meta-analysis of epidemiologic studies of adult bipolar disorder	The Journal of Clinical Psychiatry	2019
Updated meta-analysis of epidemiologic studies of pediatric bipolar disorder	The Journal of Clinical Psychiatry	2019
Detecting relapse in youth with psychotic disorders utilizing patient-generated and patient-contributed digital data from Facebook	npj Schizophrenia	2019
An International Society of Bipolar Disorders task force report: Precursors and prodromes of bipolar disorder	Bipolar Disorders	2019
