= Wilson–Kuykendall Farm =

Historic house in West Virginia, United States

- U.S. National Register of Historic Places
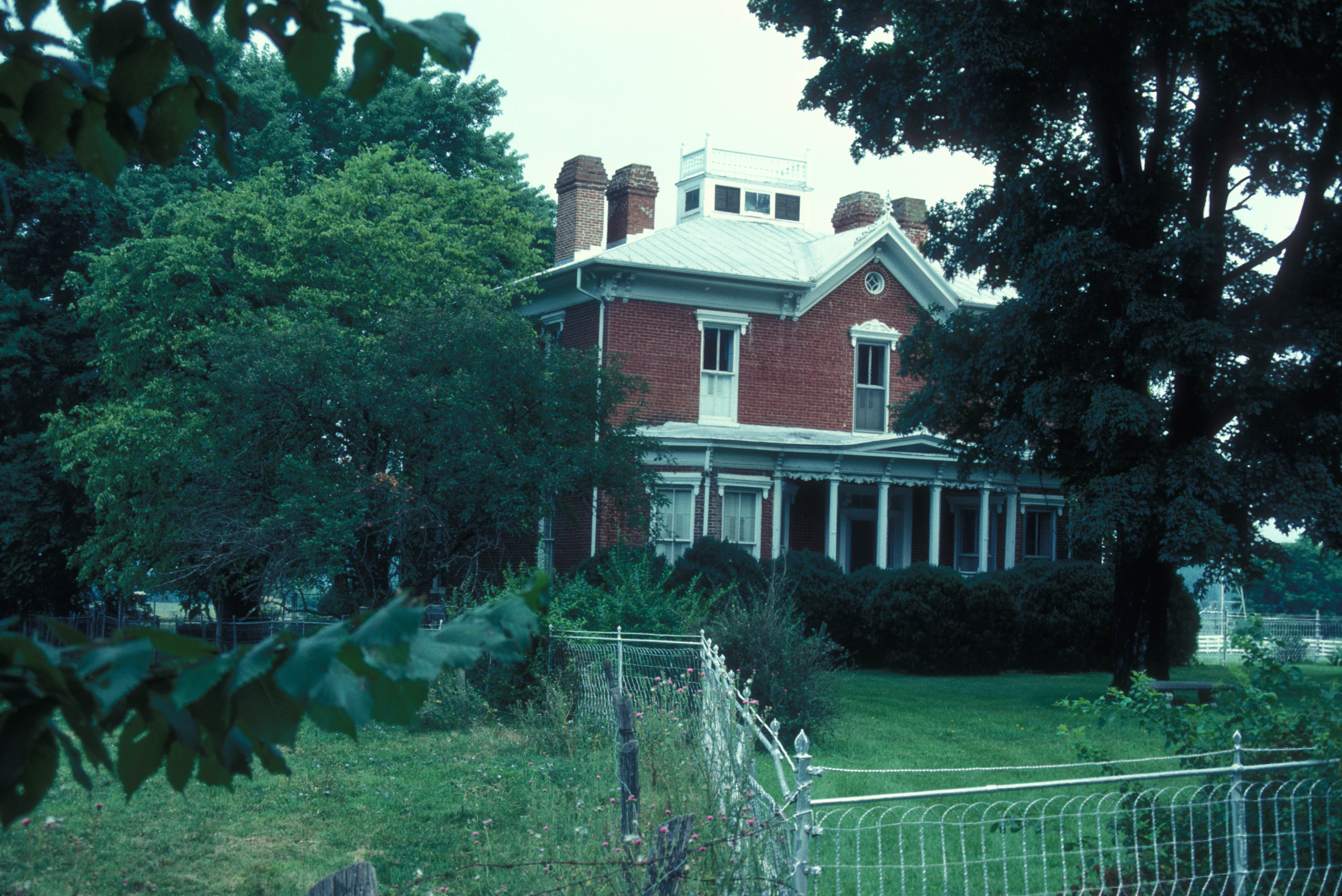

- Location within Eastern Panhandle of West Virginia Location within West Virginia Location within the United States
- Location: U.S. Route 220, near Moorefield, West Virginia
- Coordinates: 39°2′20″N 78°59′10″W
- Area: 2 acres (0.81 ha)
- Built: c. 1870
- Architect: D.L. Wilson
- Architectural style: Greek Revival
- MPS: South Branch Valley MRA
- NRHP reference No.: 85001600
- Added to NRHP: July 10, 1985

Wilson–Kuykendall Farm is a historic home located near Moorefield, Hardy County, West Virginia. It was built about 1870, and is a two-story, brick Greek Revival style dwelling. It also has Gothic and Italianate stylistic influences. It features a central roof tower with a "widows walk" flanked by paired chimney stacks. Also on the property are a contributing frame carriage house with multiple gables and a barn.

It was listed on the National Register of Historic Places in 1985.
