= Van Metre, South Dakota =

Unincorporated community in Jones County, South Dakota, US

Coordinates: 44°09′34″N 100°47′38″W

Van Metre is an unincorporated community in Jones County, in the U.S. state of South Dakota.

== History ==
Van Metre was originally Bovine; the present name is in honor of Arthur C. Van Metre, a South Dakota pioneer. A post office called Bovine was established in 1891, the name was changed to Van Metre in 1907, and the post office closed in 1960.
