= Buena Vista Farms =

- U.S. National Register of Historic Places
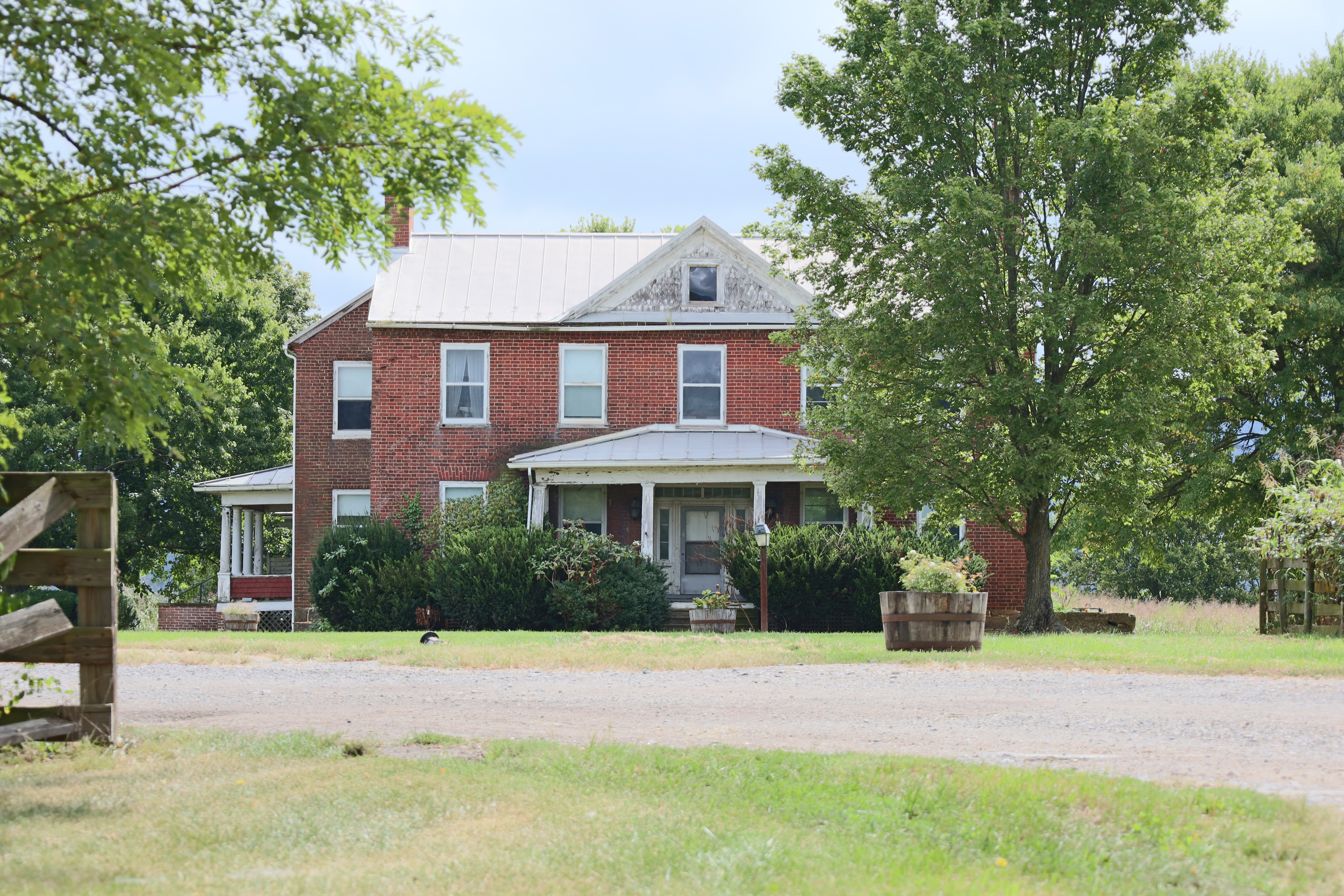

- Location within Eastern Panhandle of West Virginia Location within West Virginia Location within the United States
- Location: U.S. Route 220, near Old Fields, West Virginia
- Coordinates: 39°7′47″N 78°57′2″W
- Area: 2 acres (0.81 ha)
- Built: 1836
- Architectural style: Greek Revival, Gothic Revival
- MPS: South Branch Valley MRA
- NRHP reference No.: 85001594
- Added to NRHP: July 10, 1985

Buena Vista Farms is a historic home located near Old Fields, Hardy County, West Virginia, USA. It was listed on the National Register of Historic Places in 1985.

The main house at Buena Vista Farms was built in 1836 and is a brick dwelling in the Greek Revival style. Also on the property is a large Gothic Revival style frame bank barn dated to 1904. The house is one of four significant Van Meter family dwellings — the others being Traveler's Rest, Fort Pleasant, and the Garrett VanMeter House.
