= Fort Pleasant =

Historic house in West Virginia, U.S.

- Fort Pleasant (Isaac Van Meter House)
- U.S. National Register of Historic Places
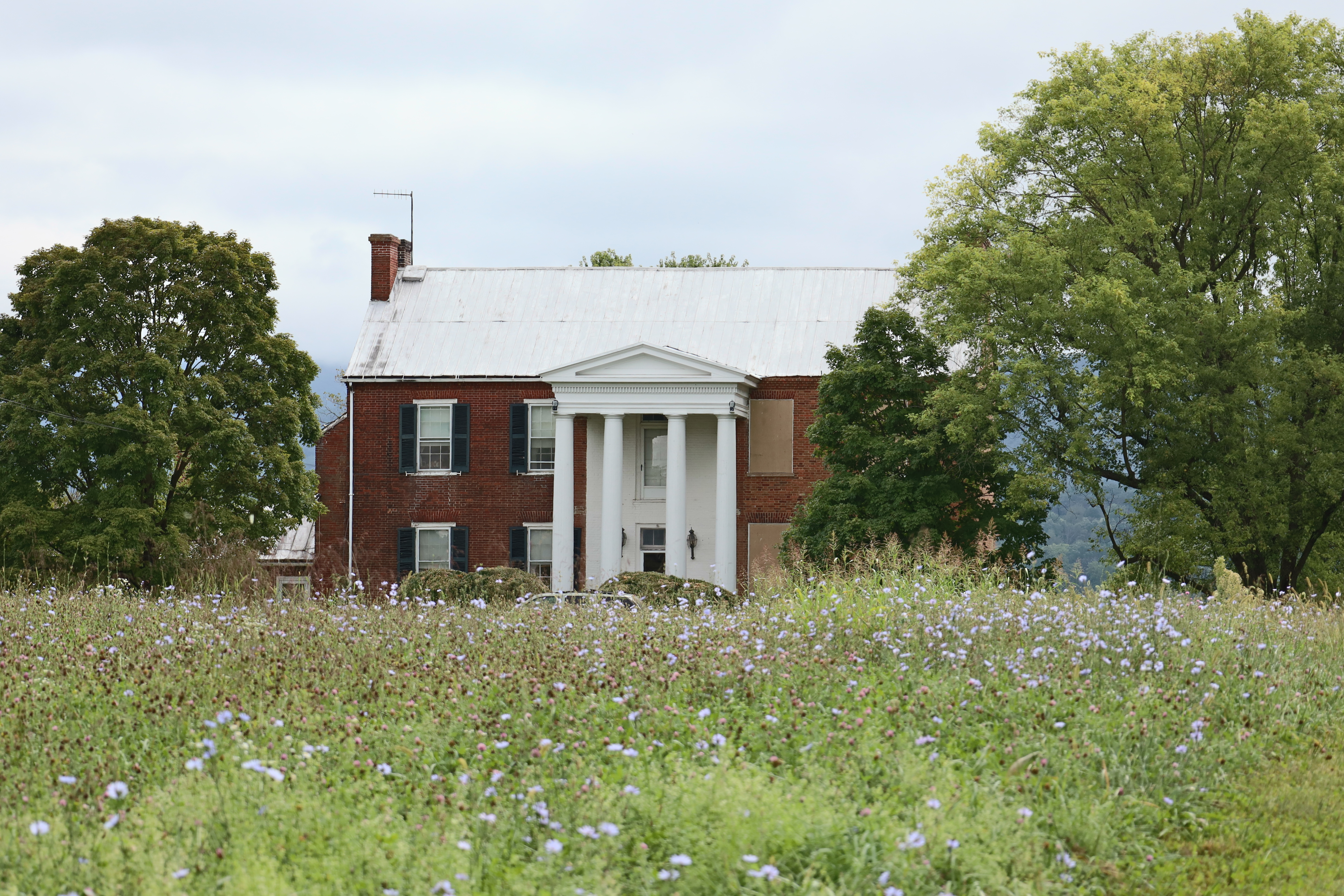
- The Isaac Van Meter House (c. 1780s-90s) in 2020

- Location within Eastern Panhandle of West Virginia Location within West Virginia Location within the United States
- Location: Old Fields north of Moorefield, West Virginia
- Coordinates: 39°8′1″N 78°56′55″W
- Built: late 18th century
- Built by: Isaac Van Meter
- Architectural style: Federal
- MPS: South Branch Valley MRA
- NRHP reference No.: 73001903
- Added to NRHP: July 16, 1973

Fort Pleasant — formerly known as Fort Van Meter and Town Fort and still also known as the Isaac Van Meter House — is a historic site located near the unincorporated community of Old Fields about five miles north of Moorefield in Hardy County, West Virginia, U.S. Situated on the South Branch Potomac River, a young Colonel George Washington directed a fortification to be built here in 1756 during the escalating hostilities with Native Americans and French known as the French and Indian War. The fierce skirmish known as the Battle of the Trough occurred about a mile and a half away the same year. The existing Federal style house, built just after the American Revolution, was listed on the National Register of Historic Places in 1973.

According to the Geographic Names Information System, Fort Pleasant was also known throughout its existence as "Fort Hopewell" and "Waggener's Lower Fort." (The latter name distinguished it from Fort Buttermilk, also known as "Fort Waggener", about five miles upstream and also built by Capt. Waggener in 1756.) It was also sometimes called "Fort Van Meter", a name now commonly given to another Van Meter family fort some nine miles downstream at the northern end of The Trough which was built around the same time.

== History ==
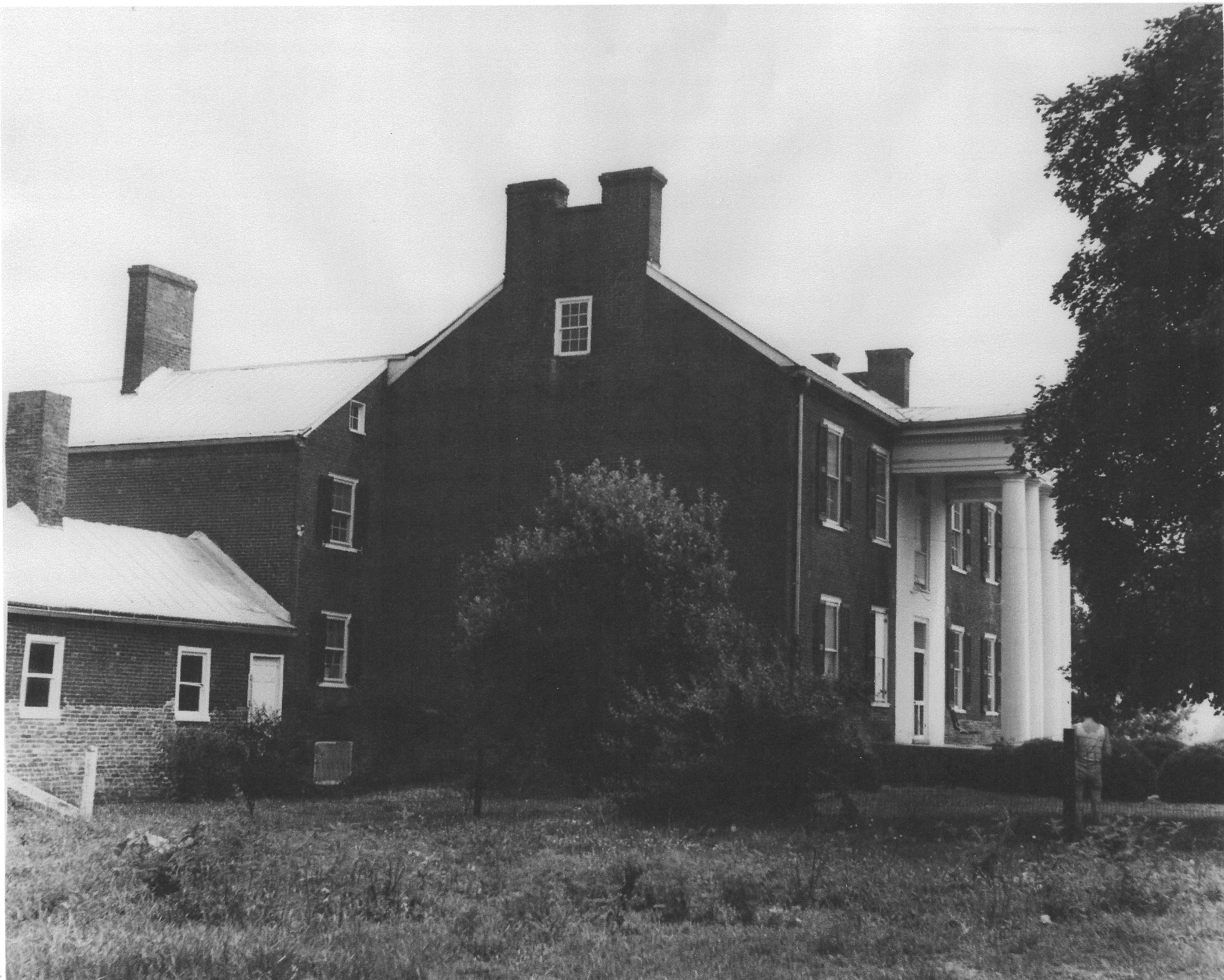
The house in 2013

=== 18th century ===
Settlement (1740s)
The area around Fort Pleasant was first settled by Isaac Van Meter (ca. 1692–1757), his wife Annetje Wynkoop, and their four children in 1744, at which time the family constructed a fortified log cabin there. George Washington first visited the "Indian Old Fields" (as the area was called) as a teenager and conversed with Isaac Van Meter there in 1747-48 while he was surveying Lord Fairfax's land grant. Washington recorded in his journal that he met with "Mr Vanmetrise" on behalf of Fairfax, who asserted that the Van Meter tract was part of his own South Branch Manor (a part of the Northern Neck Proprietary). Van Meter insisted that he had the land on the authority of the Virginia Council grants of 1730 and that they had nothing to do with Fairfax's grant. (Subsequent litigation played out until well after the Revolution, at which time the Van Meter heirs finally prevailed.)

Hostilities (1750s)
In 1756, at the outset of the French and Indian War, a large new fort and its supporting structures were erected on Isaac Van Meter's property by Captain Thomas Waggener under orders from now Colonel George Washington. The fort was first known by the name of the Van Meter family, which had also assisted in its initial construction and maintenance. It was a substantial palisaded defense enclosing a blockhouse and log houses. (Washington's written instructions indicated a quadrangular shape with 90-foot-long walls, bastions in the corners, barracks, and a magazine.) Fort Pleasant was one in a chain of forts that ran along the frontier of the Allegheny Mountains and for a time it served as the local headquarters for the Virginia Regiment on the South Branch. It was never attacked directly by Indians but several raids occurred nearby. Soon after its construction, the Battle of the Trough (1756) took place a short distance to the north in and around the large river gorge known as The Trough. In 1757, working unprotected in his fields, Isaac Van Meter was attacked, scalped, and killed by Indians of the Delaware and Shawnee tribes.

Renovations (1770s & '80s)
There exists a map/drawing of Fort Pleasant signed by James Witt and dated May 1770. The drawing shows blockhouses at the corners of the fort, suggesting that the structure was either remodeled or totally rebuilt sometime after the end of the War. After the 1777 founding of Moorefield to its south, the fort was known as "Town Fort" due to its proximity to the new town. When Washington was in the region for the last time — he visited Abraham Hite at Old Fields on 28–29 September 1784 — he observed that the Fort Pleasant blockhouse was still standing. Eventually, Isaac's son Garrett Van Meter (1732–1788) had most of the old fort and original family cabin removed and built a strong brick structure — half above ground and half below — in place of them for defensive purposes. (Parts of this unwieldy structure, connected by enclosed steps, still exist.)

The "Great House" (1790s)
The large brick house at Fort Pleasant was completed by Garrett's son, Isaac B. Van Meter (1757–1837), and his wife Elizabeth Inskeep Van Meter, before the end of the 18th century. (It was built on the very site of the old fort, thus both Fort and house bore the name "Fort Pleasant".) The impressive residence is a massive double-chimney Federal-style building constructed of clay bricks fabricated on the Fort Pleasant farm. Its "giant order" columns — colossal columns spanning two stories — were among the first such features in the region and Fort Pleasant mansion acquired a reputation as one of the "great houses" of the South Branch Valley.

=== 19th century ===
A portion of the old fort apparently survived Garrett Van Meter's renovations and the construction of the great house by his son. When Samuel Kercheval (1767–1845), the local historian, visited the site in 1830, he remarked that "one of the block-houses, with portholes was still standing, and the logs particularly sound". Thus, the last vestiges of the old fort did not vanish until later in the 19th century.

== Other Van Meter settlements ==
Fort Pleasant is one of five significant VanMeter family dwellings in the Old Fields area; the others are Traveler's Rest, Fort Van Meter, the Garrett VanMeter House, and Buena Vista Farms.

== See also ==
- List of historic sites in Hampshire County, West Virginia
- National Register of Historic Places listings in Hampshire County, West Virginia
