= Garrett VanMeter House =

Historic house in West Virginia, United States

- U.S. National Register of Historic Places
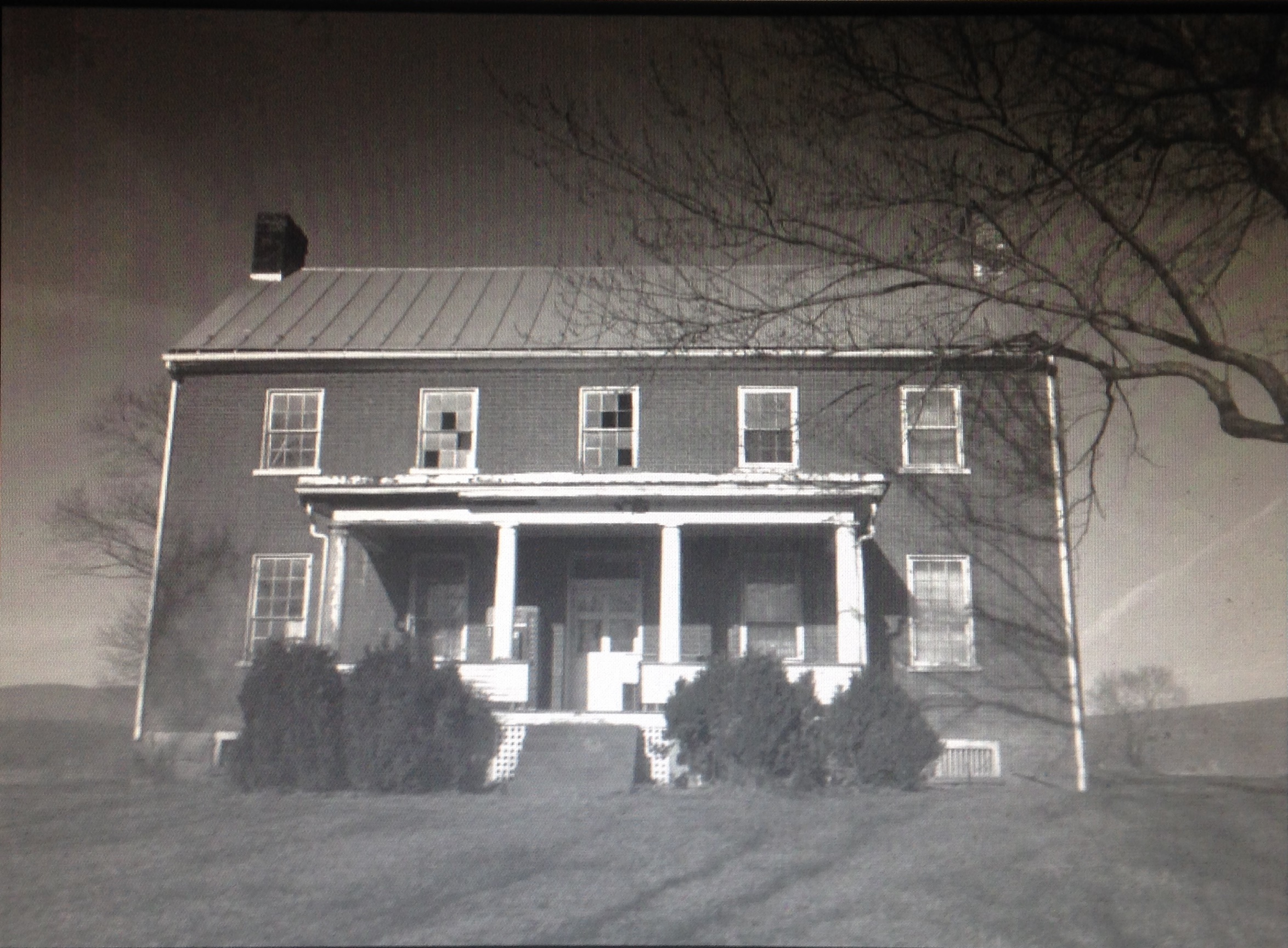

- Location within Eastern Panhandle of West Virginia Location within West Virginia Location within the United States
- Location: Off Reynolds Gap Rd., near Old Fields, West Virginia
- Coordinates: 39°8′14″N 78°56′13″W
- Area: 4.9 acres (2.0 ha)
- Built: c. 1830
- Architectural style: Greek Revival
- NRHP reference No.: 01000264
- Added to NRHP: March 27, 2001

The Garrett VanMeter House (ca. 1830) is an historic home near Old Fields, Hardy County, West Virginia, USA.

The house is a two-story brick I house dwelling with a two-story rear "ell". It has Greek Revival stylistic elements. Attached to the ell is a one-story summer kitchen. It has a side gable roof and sits on a stone foundation. It features a centered entrance portico.

The house was built about 1830 to 1835 by Garrett VanMeter (1804-1856) who had inherited the land from his father, Colonel Jacob Vanmeter. Colonel Jacob Vanmeter was the son of Colonel Garrett Vanmeter. The Vanmeters were the first white settler (1744) in the area. The Colonel (he had commanded a regiment in the Revolutionary War) was one of the wealthiest farmers in the region. He owned several hundred head of cattle and about 30 slaves. (No land records, or other corroborating documents, are available to confirm the dates of construction, which are estimates.)

The Garrett VanMeter House is one of four significant VanMeter family dwellings; the others are Traveler's Rest, Fort Pleasant, and Buena Vista Farms.

It was listed on the National Register of Historic Places in 2001.
