= Old Fields, West Virginia =

- Unincorporated community
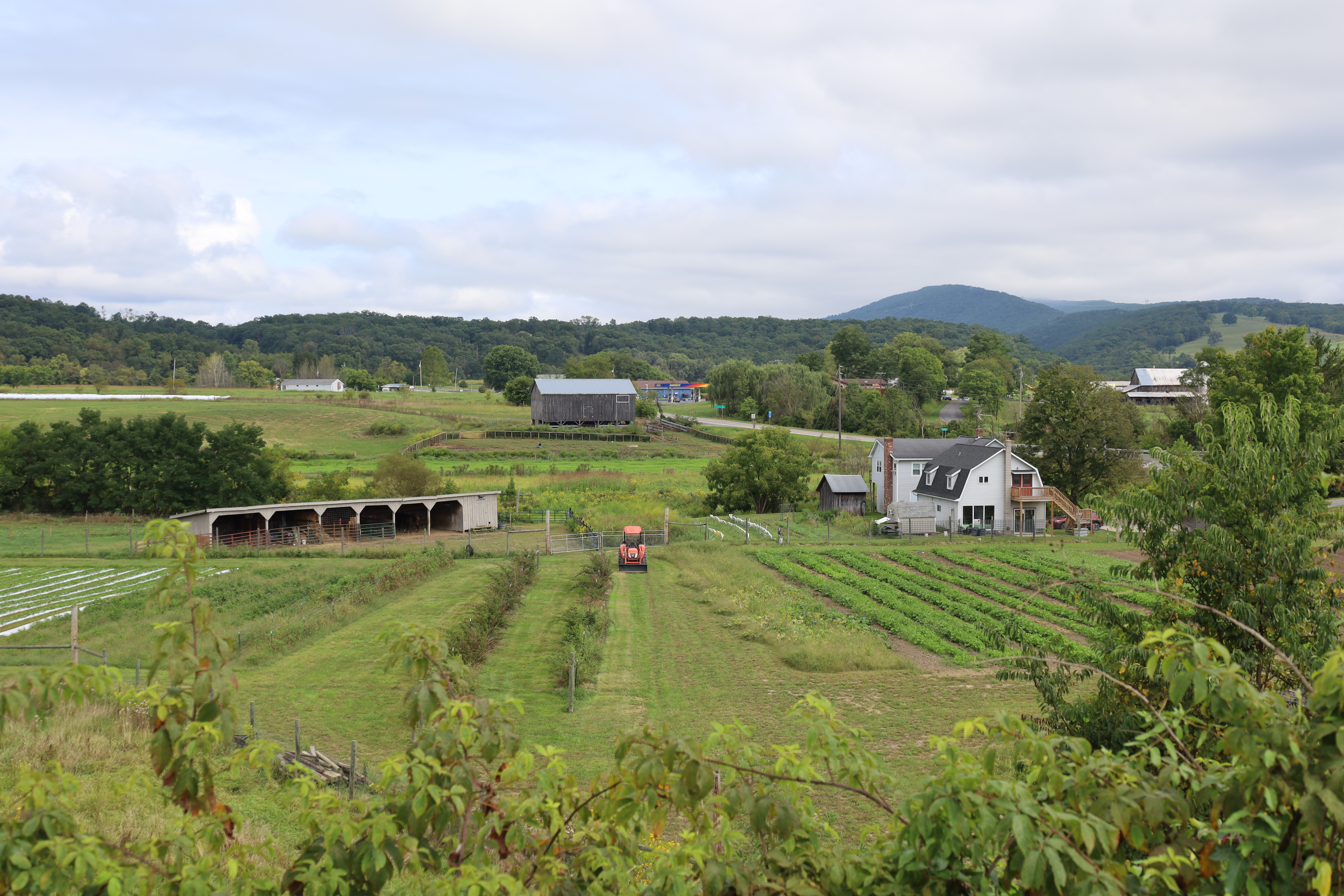

- Location within West Virginia Location within the United States
- Coordinates: 39°8′5″N 78°56′59″W
- Country: United States
- State: West Virginia
- County: Hardy
- Elevation: 804 ft (245 m)
- Time zone: UTC-5 (Eastern (EST))
  - Summer (DST): UTC-4 (EDT)
- ZIP codes: 26845
- GNIS feature ID: 1555262

Old Fields is an unincorporated community on the South Branch Potomac River in northern Hardy County, West Virginia, United States.

According to the Geographic Names Information System, Old Fields has also been known throughout its history as Indian Old Field, Indian Old Fields, and Oldfields. Also, as "Fort Pleasant," a French and Indian War fort built on the Van Meter land at Old Fields.

== History ==
The community was named for the fact the original town site was an Indian old field.

Other buildings of interest in the vicinity include Old Fields Church (1812; the second-oldest church in West Virginia), Fort Pleasant, the Isaac Van.Meter House built in the 1810s, the Garrett Van Meter House (1835), Willow Wall (1812), Buena Vista (1836), built for William T. Van Meter (killed in Gen. Wade Hampton’s “Beefsteak Raid” behind Union lines near Petersburg, Virginia, in 1864), Traveler’s Rest (1856; constructed for Garrett Van Meter’s three unmarried sisters: Ann, Rebecca, and Susan), and the Peter Casey house, where George Washington spent the night as a boy on his surveying trip for Lord Fairfax in 1748.
