= Moorefield, West Virginia =

- Town
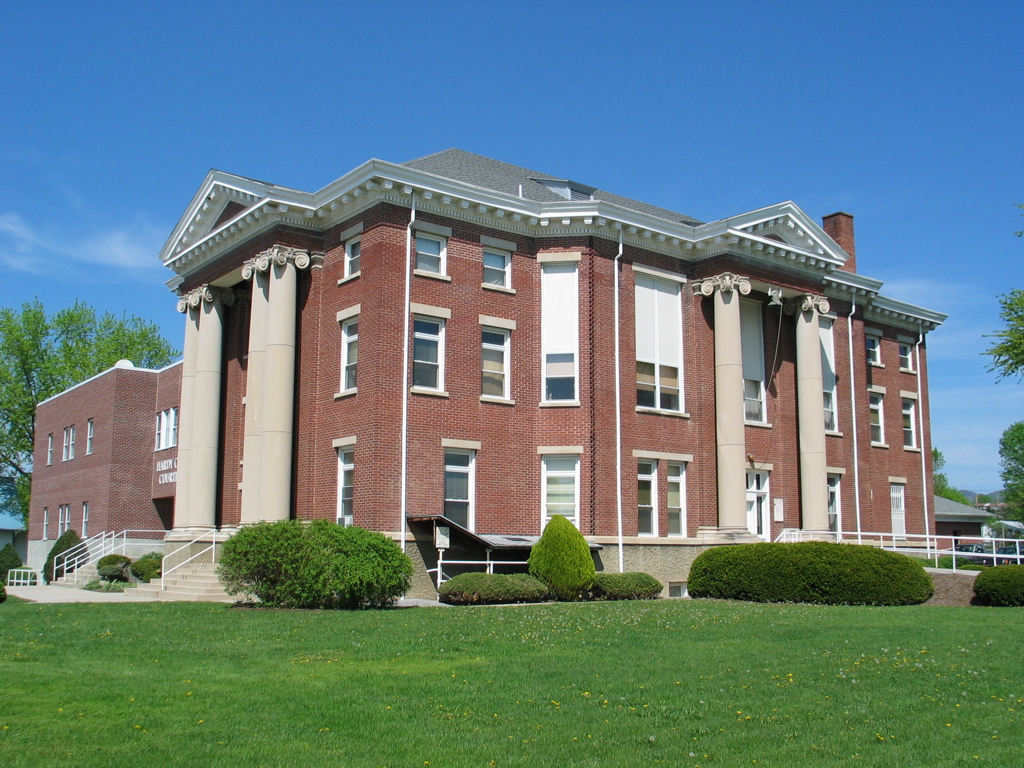
- Hardy County Courthouse in Moorefield

- Seal
- Interactive map of Moorefield, West Virginia
- Location within West Virginia Location within the United States
- Coordinates: 39°4′N 78°58′W
- Country: United States
- State: West Virginia
- County: Hardy

Government
  - Type: Mayor-council
  - Mayor: Tim Luttrell

Area
  - Total: 2.77 sq mi (7.17 km^{2})
  - Land: 2.72 sq mi (7.04 km^{2})
  - Water: 0.050 sq mi (0.13 km^{2})
- Elevation: 810 ft (247 m)

Population (2020)
  - Total: 2,524
  - Estimate (2021): 2,487
  - Density: 889.3/sq mi (343.37/km^{2})
- Time zone: UTC-5 (Eastern (EST))
  - Summer (DST): UTC-4 (EDT)
- ZIP code: 26836
- Area code: 304
- FIPS code: 54-55588
- GNIS feature ID: 1543520
- Website: Official website

Moorefield is a town in and the county seat of Hardy County, West Virginia, United States. It is located at the confluence of the South Branch Potomac River and the South Fork South Branch Potomac River. Moorefield was originally chartered in 1777; it was named for Conrad Moore, who owned the land upon which the town was laid out. The population was 2,527 at the 2020 census.

== History ==
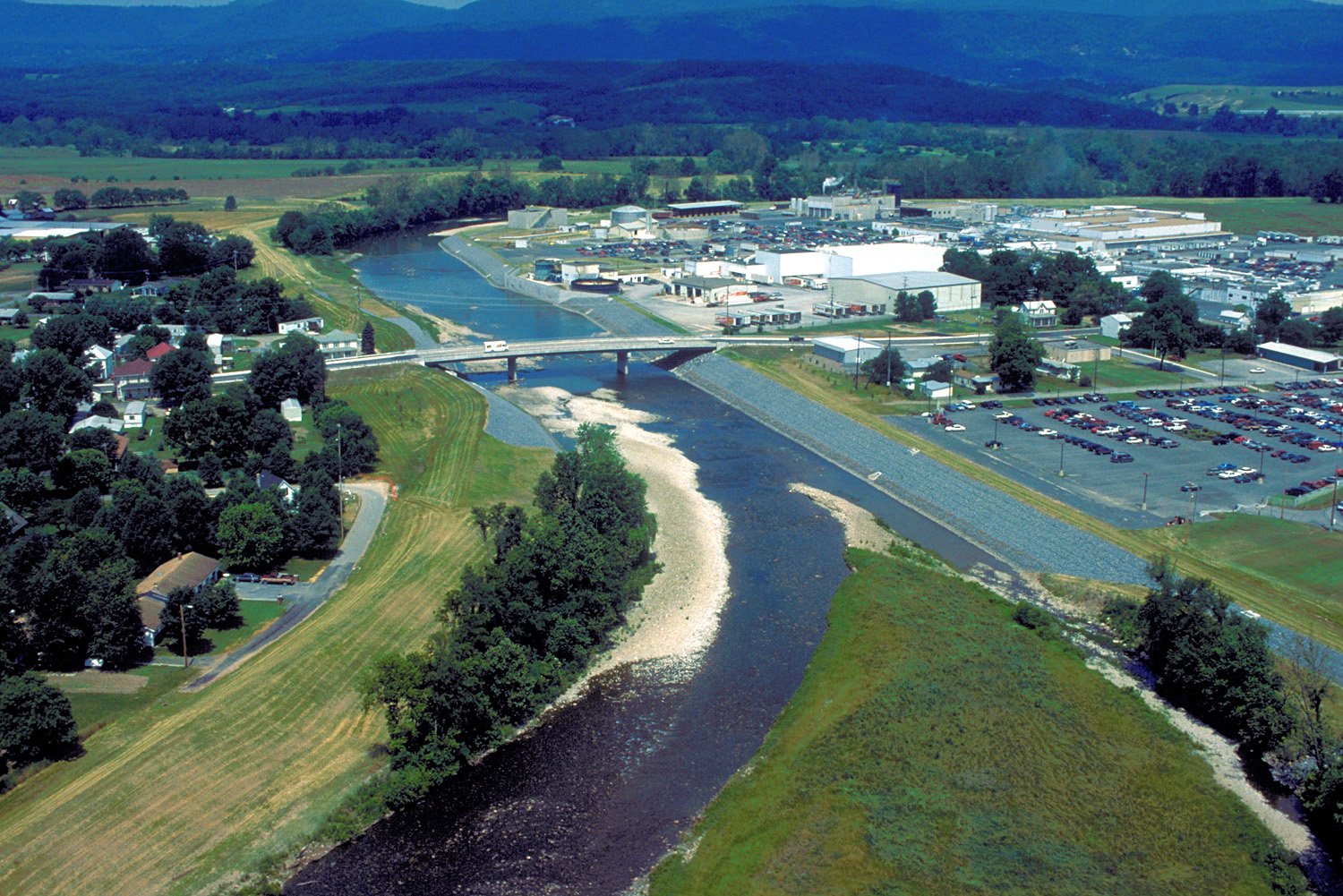
Aerial view of the business district of Moorefield, West Virginia. The U.S. Army Corps of Engineers has constructed levees along the South Fork to protect the town from flooding.

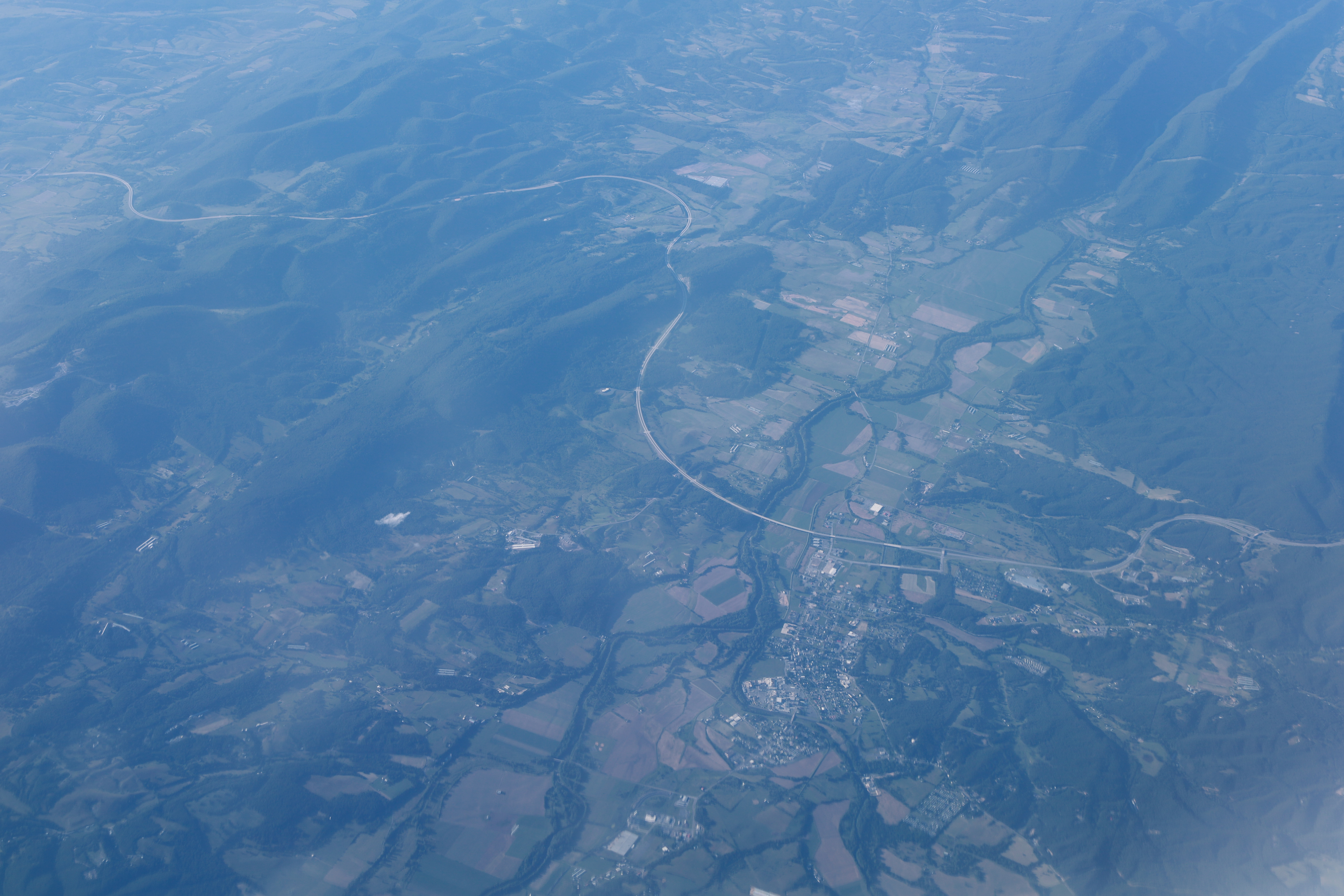
Aerial view of Moorefield and the surrounding terrain

Moorefield is situated in the South Branch Valley along the South Branch of the Potomac River. Native Americans populated this area for thousands of years. For centuries, they farmed along the river and hunted in the surrounding mountains. The historic Shawnee people, who spoke a Central Algonquian language in the same family as other tribes in their region, occupied this area when Anglo-European settlers began arriving in the early 18th century, attracted by the fertile land. This early settlement was centered on the community of Old Fields, referring to former Native American lands. This is located about five miles to the north of present-day Moorefield.

Conflict between the mostly British settlers and Native American peoples broke out during the French and Indian War. The British colonists constructed two fortifications to guard the South Branch Valley in the vicinity of Moorefield. Fort Buttermilk was erected in 1756 and garrisoned by Captain Thomas Waggoner's Virginia Regiment Company. A second fortress, Fort Pleasant, situated at Henry Van Meter's Farm at Old Fields, guarded the northern side of the valley. It was also garrisoned by Waggoner's Virginia Regiment Company. In the spring of 1756, soldiers from Forts Buttermilk and Pleasant clashed with Shawnee warriors under Bemino (also known as Killbuck) at the Battle of the Trough.

Colonist Conrad Moore owned the land on which Moorefield was laid out. In 1777, the Virginia General Assembly chartered the town of Moorefield in what was then Hampshire County, Virginia (today Hardy County, West Virginia). When Hardy County was separated from Hampshire County by act of the Virginia General Assembly in 1785, after the American Revolution, Moorefield was chosen as the county seat. Many of the historic houses in Moorefield date to the last quarter of the 18th century and first quarter of the 19th century; they display vernacular adaptations of Federal and Greek Revival architecture.

During the American Civil War, Moorefield was the site of a cavalry engagement between Union Brigadier General William W. Averell and Confederate Brigadier General John McCausland on August 7, 1864, in which Averell routed McCausland. This was part of the Valley Campaigns of 1864. That summer, Averell was the only Union commander to achieve successes against Confederate forces.

== Transportation ==
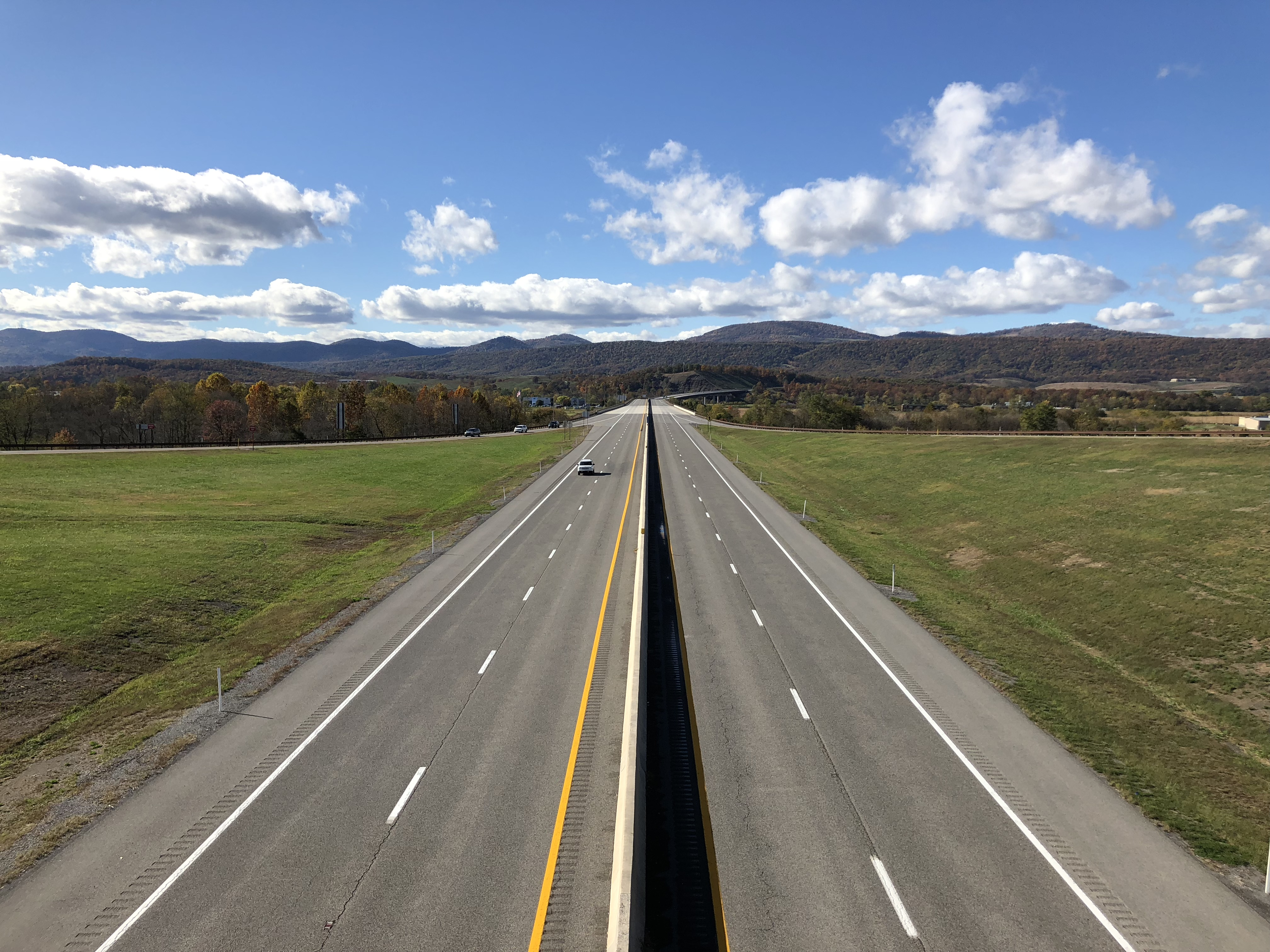
US 48 in Moorefield

=== Highways ===
The main highways serving Moorefield include U.S. Route 48, which traverses the region from west to east, and U.S. Route 220, which crosses from south to north through the area. West Virginia Route 55 and West Virginia Route 28 also serve Moorefield, but both mostly run concurrently with the aforementioned U.S. highways.

=== Public transport ===
The Potomac Valley Transit Authority operates bus service to Moorefield and surrounding counties. Fixed routes 101, 102, and 103 and on-demand route 303 service the town.

== Geography ==
Moorefield is located at 39°4′N 78°58′W (39.063, -78.966).

According to the United States Census Bureau, the town has a total area of 2.40 square miles (6.22 km^{2}), of which 2.35 square miles (6.09 km^{2}) is land and 0.05 square miles (0.13 km^{2}) is water.

=== Climate ===
The climate in this area is characterized by hot, humid summers and generally mild to cool winters. According to the Köppen Climate Classification system, Moorefield has a humid subtropical climate, abbreviated "Cfa" on climate maps.

Climate data for Moorefield, West Virginia (1991–2020 normals, extremes 1892–1933, 1947–1959, 1967–present)
| Month | Jan | Feb | Mar | Apr | May | Jun | Jul | Aug | Sep | Oct | Nov | Dec | Year |
|---|---|---|---|---|---|---|---|---|---|---|---|---|---|
| Record high °F (°C) | 81 (27) | 86 (30) | 93 (34) | 98 (37) | 98 (37) | 105 (41) | 109 (43) | 112 (44) | 106 (41) | 102 (39) | 87 (31) | 81 (27) | 112 (44) |
| Mean daily maximum °F (°C) | 42.2 (5.7) | 46.3 (7.9) | 54.5 (12.5) | 66.9 (19.4) | 75.3 (24.1) | 83.1 (28.4) | 87.0 (30.6) | 85.5 (29.7) | 79.4 (26.3) | 68.6 (20.3) | 56.0 (13.3) | 45.7 (7.6) | 65.9 (18.8) |
| Daily mean °F (°C) | 31.3 (−0.4) | 34.2 (1.2) | 41.5 (5.3) | 52.2 (11.2) | 61.9 (16.6) | 70.4 (21.3) | 74.1 (23.4) | 72.8 (22.7) | 65.9 (18.8) | 54.6 (12.6) | 42.9 (6.1) | 34.7 (1.5) | 53.0 (11.7) |
| Mean daily minimum °F (°C) | 20.3 (−6.5) | 22.1 (−5.5) | 28.5 (−1.9) | 37.6 (3.1) | 48.5 (9.2) | 57.6 (14.2) | 61.3 (16.3) | 60.1 (15.6) | 52.4 (11.3) | 40.6 (4.8) | 29.8 (−1.2) | 23.7 (−4.6) | 40.2 (4.6) |
| Record low °F (°C) | −27 (−33) | −25 (−32) | −9 (−23) | 12 (−11) | 25 (−4) | 29 (−2) | 39 (4) | 38 (3) | 27 (−3) | 13 (−11) | −1 (−18) | −26 (−32) | −27 (−33) |
| Average precipitation inches (mm) | 2.17 (55) | 1.71 (43) | 2.86 (73) | 3.09 (78) | 3.78 (96) | 3.69 (94) | 4.37 (111) | 3.26 (83) | 3.45 (88) | 2.47 (63) | 2.04 (52) | 2.30 (58) | 44.02 (1,118) |
| Average snowfall inches (cm) | 6.6 (17) | 4.9 (12) | 4.2 (11) | 0.0 (0.0) | 0.0 (0.0) | 0.0 (0.0) | 0.0 (0.0) | 0.0 (0.0) | 0.0 (0.0) | 0.0 (0.0) | 0.8 (2.0) | 4.9 (12) | 21.4 (54) |
| Average precipitation days (≥ 0.01 in) | 7.6 | 6.8 | 9.2 | 10.7 | 12.3 | 10.8 | 10.4 | 9.9 | 8.4 | 7.6 | 6.9 | 7.6 | 108.2 |
| Average snowy days (≥ 0.1 in) | 2.3 | 1.9 | 1.2 | 0.0 | 0.0 | 0.0 | 0.0 | 0.0 | 0.0 | 0.0 | 0.2 | 1.4 | 7.0 |
Source: NOAA

== Demographics ==
Historical population
| Census | Pop. | Note | %± |
|---|---|---|---|
| 1880 | 554 | | — |
| 1890 | 495 | | −10.6% |
| 1900 | 460 | | −7.1% |
| 1910 | 646 | | 40.4% |
| 1920 | 630 | | −2.5% |
| 1930 | 734 | | 16.5% |
| 1940 | 1,291 | | 75.9% |
| 1950 | 1,405 | | 8.8% |
| 1960 | 1,434 | | 2.1% |
| 1970 | 2,124 | | 48.1% |
| 1980 | 2,257 | | 6.3% |
| 1990 | 2,148 | | −4.8% |
| 2000 | 2,375 | | 10.6% |
| 2010 | 2,544 | | 7.1% |
| 2020 | 2,524 | | −0.8% |
| 2021 (est.) | 2,487 | ▼ | −1.5% |
U.S. Decennial Census

The median income for a household in the town was $24,178, and the median income for a family was $28,919. Males had a median income of $24,423 versus $17,917 for females. The per capita income for the town was $15,704. About 19.8% of families and 21.4% of the population were below the poverty line, including 31.2% of those under age 18 and 24.4% of those age 65 or over.

=== 2010 census ===
As of the census of 2010, there were 2,544 people, 1,097 households, and 624 families residing in the town. The population density was 1,082.6 inhabitants per square mile (418.0/km^{2}). There were 1,216 housing units at an average density of 517.4 per square mile (199.8/km^{2}). The racial makeup of the town was 79.0% White, 8.6% African American, 0.4% Native American, 4.7% Asian, 5.4% from other races, and 1.8% from two or more races. Hispanic or Latino of any race were 11.0% of the population.

There were 1,097 households, of which 27.5% had children under the age of 18 living with them, 37.5% were married couples living together, 13.8% had a female householder with no husband present, 5.7% had a male householder with no wife present, and 43.1% were non-families. 34.7% of all households were made up of individuals, and 15.1% had someone living alone who was 65 years of age or older. The average household size was 2.32 and the average family size was 2.90.

The median age in the town was 40.1 years. 20.1% of residents were under the age of 18; 9.5% were between the ages of 18 and 24; 27.2% were from 25 to 44; 26.7% were from 45 to 64; and 16.4% were 65 years of age or older. The gender makeup of the town was 50.9% male and 49.1% female.

== Notable people ==
- Florence V. Brittingham (1856–1891), poet, short story writer.
- Lyscum Elbert Crowson (1903–1993), Methodist minister, leader of West Virginia's 1960s movement against bars and saloons.
- Willard Duncan Vandiver (1854–1932), Missouri congressman who popularized the "Show Me State" nickname, was born near Moorefield.
