= U.S. Route 48 =

Highway in the United States

U.S. Route 48
- Corridor H
- US 48 (as of June 2026) highlighted in red

Route information
- Length: 157 mi (253 km)
- Existed: 2002–present
- Tourist routes: Virginia Byway

Major junctions
- West end: I-79 / US 33 / US 119 at Weston, WV
- US 220 / WV 28 / WV 55 at Moorefield, WV
- East end: I-81 / SR 55 at Strasburg, VA

Location
- Country: United States
- States: West Virginia, Virginia
- Counties: WV: Lewis, Upshur, Barbour, Randolph, Tucker, Grant, Hardy; VA: Shenandoah

Highway system
- United States Numbered Highway System; List; Special; Divided
← US 46	US	→ US 49
← WV 47	WV	→ WV 49
← SR 47	VA	→ SR 48

U.S. Route 48 (US 48), also known as the incomplete Corridor H of the Appalachian Development Highway System, extends from Interstate 79 (I-79) in Weston, West Virginia, eastward across the crest of the Allegheny Mountains to I-81 in Strasburg, Virginia. It runs for 157 miles (253 km) from northwestern Virginia to central West Virginia.

The route is planned as a four-lane divided highway and has been constructed in segments, most of which are open. The westernmost portion from Weston to Lorentz was constructed in the 1970s; the extension east to Elkins was constructed in the early 1990s, and the segment between Davis and Wardensville was constructed in segments which opened during 2002–2016. As of 2026, two segments are not yet upgraded and remain having the U.S. 48 designation: Parsons–Davis and Wardensville–Strasburg.

West Virginia's segment of Corridor H crosses very mountainous terrain, some of the most rugged in the eastern United States, and crosses two major rivers. There are more than 1000 historic structures, five historic districts, two Civil War battlefields, and other archaeological sites within five miles (8.0 km) of Corridor H, and the highway crosses through two national forests. There are over 50 species of plants and animals that are protected under the Endangered Species Act and more than 150 native trout streams, thousands of acres of wetlands and high mountain bogs, areas of karst terrain, and abandoned coal mines within the Corridor H study area.

Two previous highways were designated as US 48. The first, in California, was incorporated into the route of US 50; the second, in western Maryland and West Virginia, was redesignated Interstate 68.

== Route description ==
=== West Virginia ===
US 48 begins as a four-lane divided highway at an interchange with Interstate 79 outside Weston. It follows the valley of Stonecoal Creek and then Fink Run until it crosses the Buckhannon River at Buckhannon. It then cuts across the Allegheny Plateau, and crosses through the water gap of the Tygart Valley River between Rich Mountain and Laurel Mountain to reach Elkins. It then travels north up the Leading Creek valley, picking up a concurrency with U.S. Route 219. At Kerens, the US 219 concurrency ends. The route then enters the Monongahela National Forest, crosses Haddix Run, and has an intersection with US 219. North of Parsons, US 48 has an interchange with West Virginia Route 72, where the divided highway ends. A concurrency with WV 72 takes US 48 south into Parsons, where the routes rejoin US 219. Exiting the city to the east, the routes cross the Cheat River, later crossing the Allegheny Mountains highlands to Thomas. At this point, US 219 splits off to the north, while US 48 briefly follows West Virginia Route 32 to Davis, after which it again becomes a four-lane divided highway. US 48 travels up Beaver Creek and passes by Mount Storm Lake.

US 48 then descends the Allegheny Front near Bismarck. It then crosses Patterson Creek Mountain to reach Moorefield, where it crosses the South Branch Potomac River. It then ascends South Branch Mountain, during which it crosses the Clifford Hollow Bridge, and then descends to Baker. The highway then follows the Lost River and Cacapon River down to Wardensville, where the four-lane highway again ends. It then ascends to the ridge of Great North Mountain, where it crosses the border into Virginia.

=== Virginia ===
US 48 is fully signed along the portion of current State Route 55 (Virginia SR 55) west of I-81. The route begins at the West Virginia state line at the highway's summit of Great North Mountain, signed as US 48 and WV 55 from Wardensville. Entering Virginia, US 48 heads northeast as two-lane Wardensville Pike through George Washington National Forest and descends the mountain to the settlement of Star Tannery, where the highway leaves Frederick County by crossing Cedar Creek. The road's name changes to John Marshall Highway, and it passes around the northern end of Little North Mountain near the community of Wheatfield, turning south. US 48 passes through the Shenandoah County communities of Lebanon Church and Clary on its way to a diamond interchange with I-81, which serves as US 48's eastern terminus.

== History ==
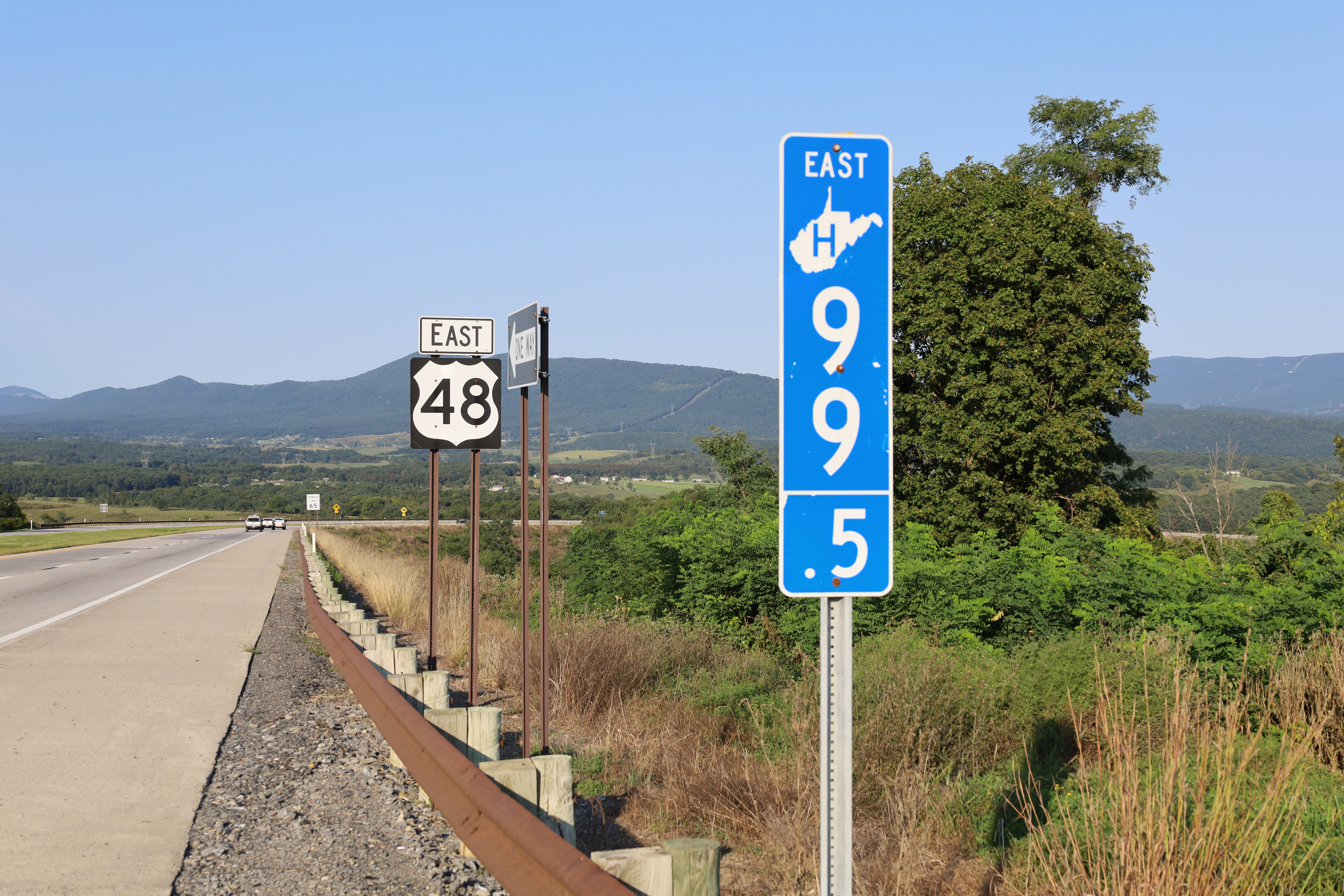
Special mileposts identify US 48 as part of Appalachian Development Highway System Corridor H.

The Appalachian Regional Development Act of 1965 was passed as part of an effort to stimulate economic growth in Appalachian rural areas. The Appalachian Regional Commission (ARC) was created by the act, which also authorized the ARC to create the Appalachian Development Highway System (ADHS). The Appalachian region, as defined by the act, stretches from Mississippi to New York. Congress defined it to "provide a highway system which, in conjunction with the Interstate System and other Federal-aid highways in the Appalachian region, will open up an area or areas where commerce and communication have been inhibited by lack of adequate access". Some 23 transportation corridors were to be developed as part of the ADHS, and Corridor H was designated in 1965.

Corridor H has had a particularly controversial history as conservationists and environmentalists vied with federal agents, developers and the business community over the issue of what constituted the most environmentally sensitive route among several alternatives.

This current designation for Corridor H is inconsistent with the AASHTO numbering scheme, which places east–west U.S. Routes in ascending numerical order southward across the continental U.S. The current route is located south of US 50 and north of US 60 and therefore should have a route number in the 50s. However, there are no unused even numbers in the 50s, since US 52, US 54, US 56, and US 58 already exist.

Corridor H was originally envisioned as an Appalachian Regional Development (ARD) corridor highway that was to run from Weston, West Virginia, to Strasburg or New Market, Virginia, via Elkins, West Virginia. This proposed four-lane highway soon became one of the most controversial APD corridor highways in West Virginia that would lead to numerous legal (and political) battles within the state. The state was forced to deal with numerous environmental and economic issues, a battle that would continue for 40 years.

=== Lawsuits and settlements ===
Corridor H Alternatives (CHA) filed a lawsuit, the first for the project since its realignment, in U.S. District Court in November 1996 challenging the Record of Decision for the entire 100-mile (160 km) Corridor H project. The lawsuit stated that the Federal Highway Administration (FHWA) violated the National Environmental Policy Act (NEPA) by "failing to consider an improved roadway alternative (IRA) and by failing to prepare a Supplemental EIS to consider the impacts of the Corrick's Ford Battlefield alignment shift." The lawsuit further states that the FHWA "violated laws by issuing a Record of Decision prior to completing the evaluation of Corridor H's impacts" on historic structures and lands.

In 1997, briefs were filed and oral arguments took place. In October, the U.S. District Court ruled in favor of the Federal Highway Administration and the West Virginia Department of Transportation on all counts, however, CHA appealed the ruling to the U.S. Court of Appeals.

Briefs were once again filed in 1998 and oral arguments were presented throughout the year. In September, the CHA filed a second lawsuit that challenged the FHWA's findings of "no constructive" use for two properties. In November of that year, the Court system ordered the Department of Transportation to halt construction of Corridor H except for a 3.5-mile (5.6 km) section near Elkins.

In 1999, the U.S. Court of Appeals ruled in favor of the FHWA and the West Virginia Department of Transportation on the first lawsuit. On the second lawsuit, the court ruled in favor of CHA, stating that "all studies of historic properties must be completed before construction proceeds." In March, the Court dismissed the second lawsuit without prejudice, and allowed the CHA to file a new lawsuit challenging the decisions of the FHWA and the West Virginia Department of Transportation when Section 106/section 4(f) is complete for the entire Corridor H project. In May, a court order was produced that prohibited the FHWA from proceeding further with Corridor H until they have completed the Section 106 process and issued an amended Record of Decision. There were two exceptions to this however: work was allowed to proceed on the "Northern Elkins Bypass" and design work was allowed to proceed. This was the 5.5-mile (8.9 km) segment of Corridor H between Elkins and Kerens, or Phase I.

In December 1999, an agreement was reached. The Corridor H project was to be divided into nine separate projects from Elkins, West Virginia, to the Virginia state line. As stated in the agreement, impacts were to be avoided near Corricks Ford/Shavers Fork Valley and Blackwater Canyon; the completion of ongoing studies; and the deferment of the Wardensville, West Virginia, to Virginia state line segment with final design and right-of-way acquisition restricted until specific conditions are met not to exceed 20 years. This delay could be shortened if Virginia approves their 14-mile (23 km) section of Corridor H (US 48) between the West Virginia state line and Interstate 81, if traffic increases significantly on WV 55 between Wardensville and the state line, or if it is required to ensue eligibility for Appalachian highway corridor funding.

The agreement also established alternative dispute resolution procedures and that the plaintiffs were to waive the right to bring future lawsuits against the FHWA and the West Virginia Department of Transportation that would seek any further study of any alternative that does not include completing Corridor H as a continuous four-lane highway.

One of the leading firms on the Corridor H project, the Michael Baker Corporation, proposed and designed two 20-acre (81,000 m^{2}) wetland mitigation sites. In addition, Baker, in conjunction with the West Virginia Department of Highways and the Federal Highway Administration, developed a "comprehensive mitigation plan for vegetative, water quality, acid drainage and wildlife issues for the entire 100+-mile long project."

Michael Baker Corporation's scientists also completed extensive surveys for endangered plant and animal species. Identified were the buffalo clover, the Indiana bat, the Virginia big-eared bat, Cheat Mountain salamander and the West Virginia northern flying squirrel. Based on this, Baker assisted the Department of Highways and the FHWA in conjunction with the U.S. Fish and Wildlife Service to prepare a biological assessment for the Indiana bat, which resulted in a finding that Corridor H will not adversely affect the habitat. A formal consultation is ongoing for the West Virginia northern flying squirrel.

=== Weston to Elkins ===
The route was to follow U.S. Route 33 from Weston to Seneca Rocks, West Virginia, where two alignments to the east were proposed. One alignment would follow a new alignment over North Fork Mountain and Foremost Mountain to New Market, Virginia, while another proposal called for an alignment paralleling WV 55/VA 55 to Strasburg, Virginia. A timeline of construction completions are:

- 1972: Milepost 19.62 to 20.61 opened to traffic. This was at the Interstate 79 interchange in Lewis County.
- 1975: Corridor H was extended further east from milepost 20.61 to 23.62 at Horner and County Route 15 in Lewis County.
- 1976: A six-mile (10 km) segment was opened to traffic from milepost 23.62 at Horner and County Route 15 in Lewis County to the Upshur County line (MP 27.04), and from milepost 0 to 1.22 in Upshur County near Lorentz. Also completed was the "racetrack" portion of Corridor H east of Elkins, from Canfield to Bowden. A northern bypass of Elkins was to connect the "racetrack" to portions of Corridor H west of the city. This bypass was never constructed.
- 1979: Three miles were completed in Upshur County from milepost 1.22 to 4.35 near Lorentz.
- 1991: A three-mile (5 km) section of highway opened from milepost 4.35 near Lorentz to 8.31 at Buckhannon in Upshur County.
- 1994: The longest section of Corridor H from Weston to Elkins opened from milepost 8.31 to 15.40 in Upshur County, continuing into Barbour County from mileposts 0 to 4.43, and into Randolph county from mileposts 0 to 4.17. The total mileage for the final Weston to Elkins segment came in at 15.69 miles (25.25 km).

Approximately 40 miles (64 km) was completed from Interstate 79 at Weston to Elkins.

=== Elkins to the Virginia state line ===
Another 7-mile (11 km) segment was completed from Canfield to Bowden just east of Elkins and was dubbed the "racetrack" for its vast improvement over the old alignment and its isolation from other four-lane highways. A northern bypass of Elkins was to connect the two segments of Corridor H, however, it was never constructed as the segments east of Bowden were met with intense opposition. Meanwhile, an alignment following U.S. Highway 33 to Seneca Rocks and then WV 55/VA 55 to Strasburg, Virginia, was favored within the West Virginia Department of Transportation.

In 1981, the West Virginia Department of Transportation began planning for a new alignment east of Bowden along U.S. Highway 33 and WV 55/VA 55. A Draft Environmental Impact Statement (DEIS) was issued. Funding issues, however, caused the project to be put on hold until 1990. No Final Environmental Impact Statements or Record of Decisions were completed.

In 1990, the project was resurrected and a reevaluation of the Corridor H alignment east of Bowden was conducted. A new DEIS was prepared and all corridors considered in the 1981 DEIS were studied equally. Scoping meetings were held that October. The purpose and need documentation was completed in March 1992 and a Corridor Selection Draft Environmental Impact Statement (CSDEIS) was completed in October.

In 1993, a revised EIS was published with a new route to go north from Elkins to Moorefield and then into Virginia. Many citizens, however, felt that improving existing routes would be a better alternative. Of the 4,000 comments written in 1995 at public meetings, over half opposed the new Corridor H alignment. They cited the damage to two national forests, 41 streams, historical sites, Civil War battlefields, farms and Main Street businesses. For some, the costs outweighed the benefits.

In October 1994, an Alignment Selection Draft Environmental Impact Statement (ASDEIS) was issued. The DEIS focused on alignment selection within the preferred corridor identified within the CSDEIS.

In April 1996, a Federal Environmental Impact Statement (FEIS) was issued that consisted of a revised version of the ASDEIS along with some of the CSDEIS. In September, a Record of Decision was issued on the preferred alignment east of Bowden.

==== Phase 1: Elkins to Kerens ====
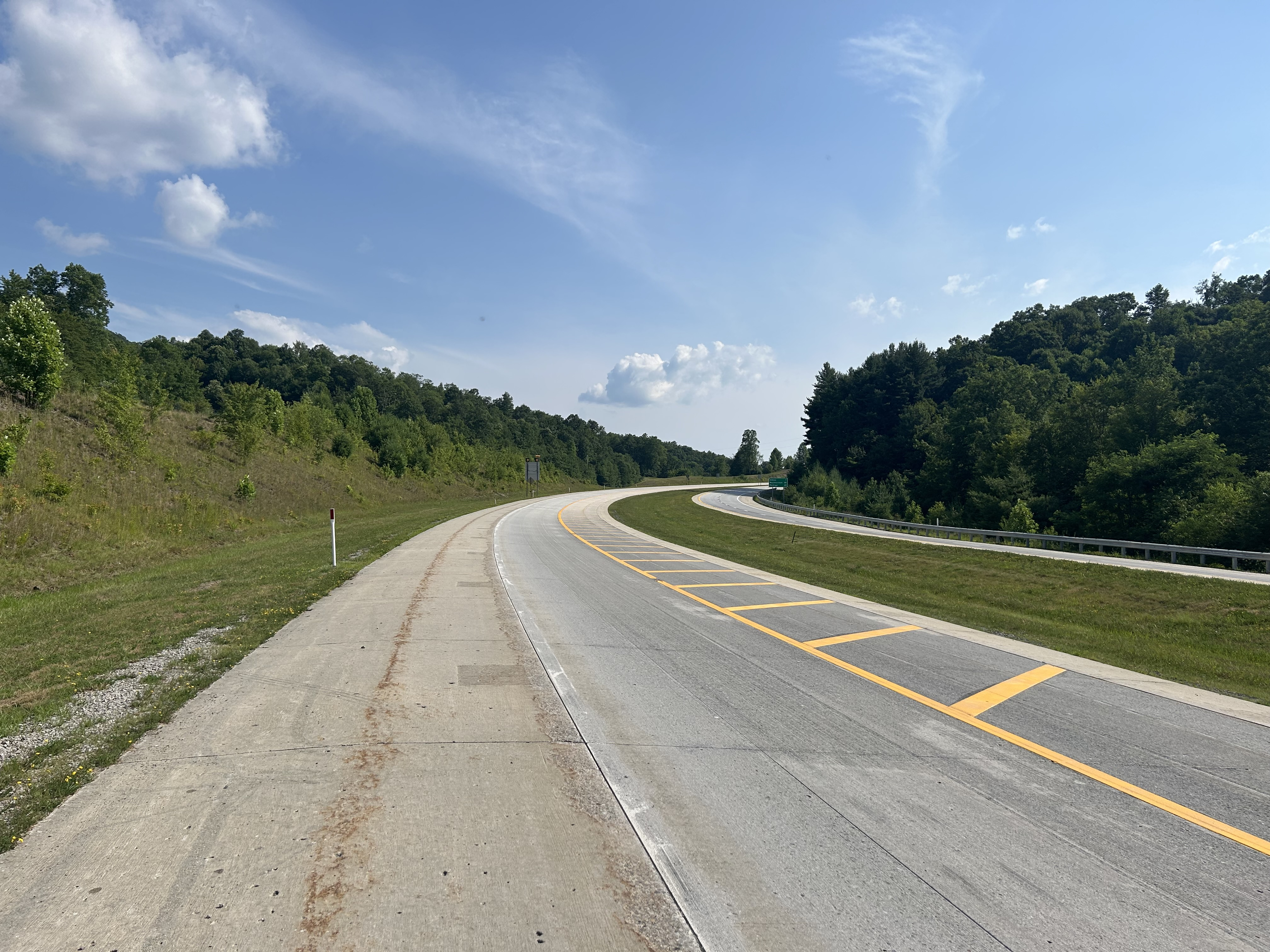
View west along Corridor H at its then-eastern terminus of its western section in 2025

In October 1998, the first contract for Corridor H's construction east of Elkins was awarded from US 33 to US 219.

A 5.48-mile (8.82 km) segment of Corridor H opened to traffic on August 12, 2002. This segment of four-lane expressway stretches from CR 11 west of Elkins to CR 7 near Kerens and includes one interchange in the project for U.S. Highway 219. This was finished under six contracts totaling $87.6 million. The then-Governor Bob Wise celebrated the historic opening with Senator Robert C. Byrd and Transportation Secretary Fred VanKirk.

On August 19, a three-mile (5 km) segment was dedicated from CR 1 to CR 23/4 that was constructed under two contracts totalling $24.1 million. This completed the nine-mile (14 km) phase one segment.

==== Phase 2: Kerens to Parsons ====
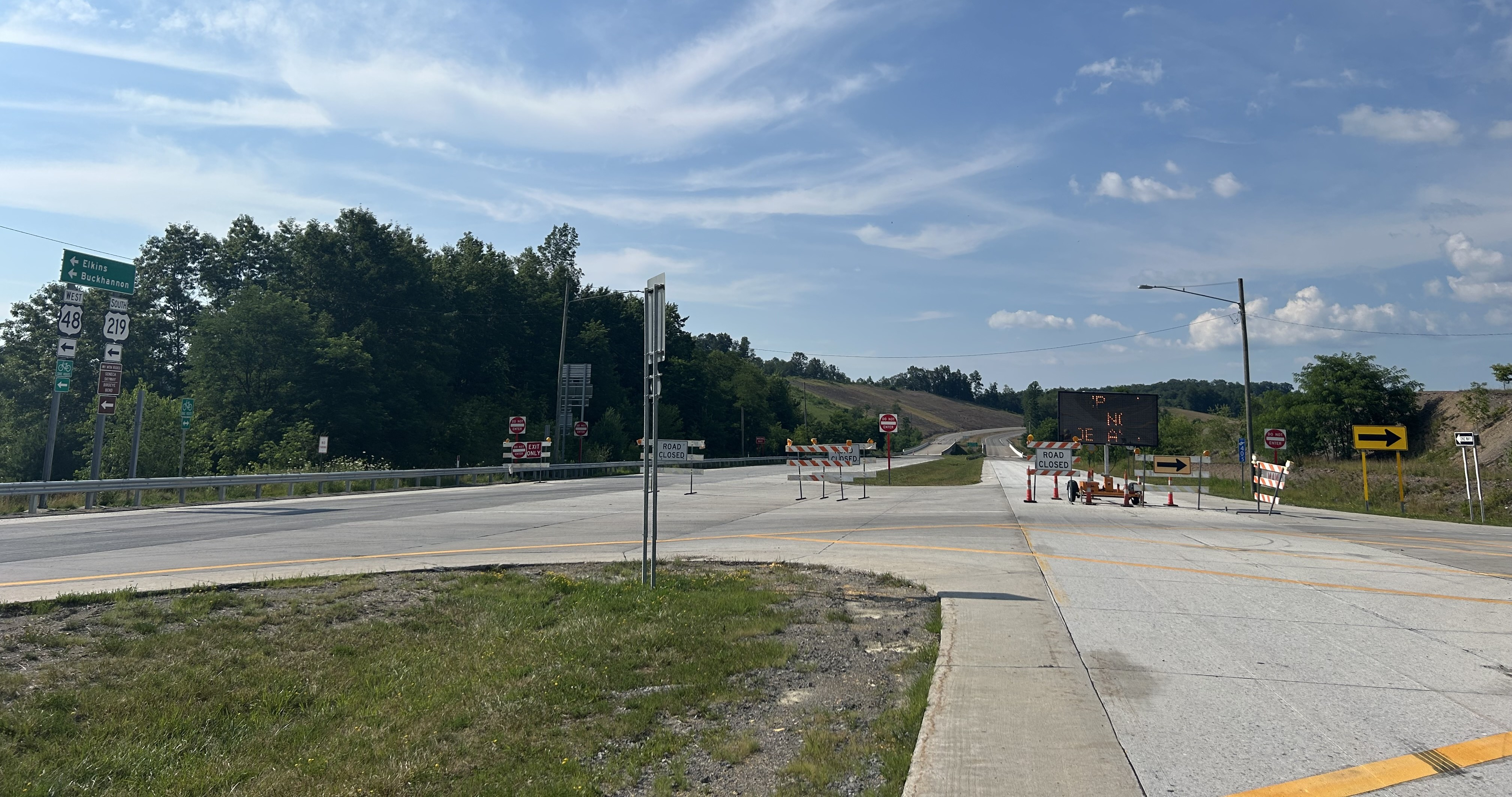
The then-unopened Kerens to Parsons segment of Corridor H nearing completion as seen from the eastern end of Corridor H's western section in 2025. Most of this segment would later finish construction and open the very next year.

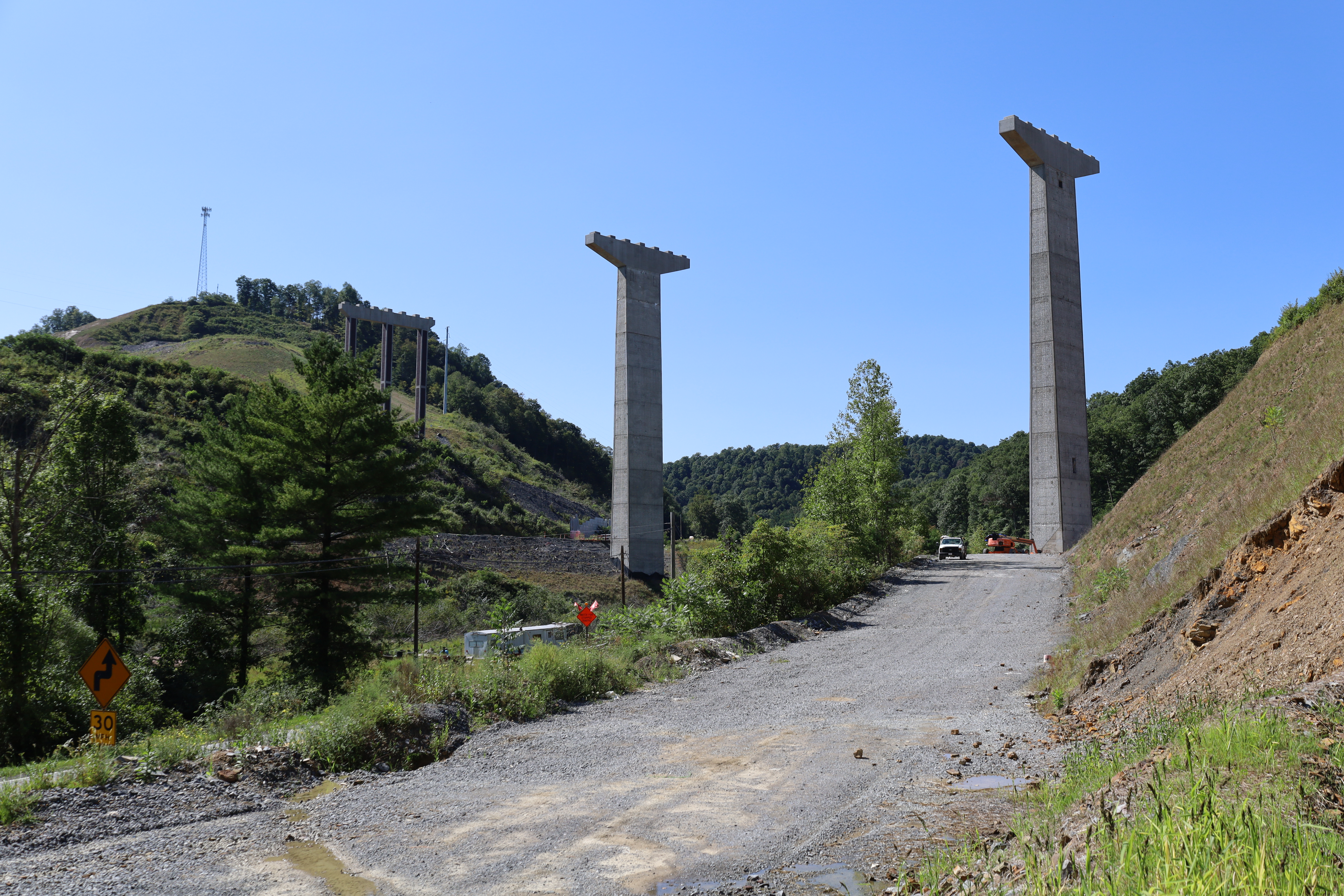
Construction of a bridge on the Kerens to Parsons segment in 2021

This 13.5-mile (21.7 km) segment of Corridor H travels through Randolph and Tucker counties; more specifically from County Route 7 near Kerens to a future U.S. Highway 219 interchange approximately two miles east of Parsons. Proceeding northward from County Route 7, it would have a span at Wilmouth Run and County Route 3. The alignment then turns more northeastward, entering the Monongahela National Forest, crossing the South Branch of Haddix Run Road and U.S. Highway 219. It has one final water crossing at Cheat River before concluding at County Route 219/4.

In Parsons, a public informational meeting was held on September 26, 2000. Alignments were studied and a Settlement Agreement allowed construction to continue on segments in Hardy and Randolph counties. It was also chosen to avoid the Corricks Ford Battlefield.

Alternative "DF" was chosen as the preferred alternative for the highway and in October 2001, the Federal Highway Administration gave the go-ahead for the Supplemental Draft Environmental Impact Statement. The Federal Environment Impact Statement was completed in April 2002 with the Record of Decision approved in June of that year.

The Department of Highways received approval for the Supplemental Final Environmental Impact Statement in October 2002. The commenting period was extended 60 days to February 25, 2003. The Amended Record of Decision was approved on May 12, 2003.

Six consultants were hired to provide the final design for the 13.5-mile (21.7 km) segment of Corridor H from Kerens to Parsons. As of 2015, final design had not yet been completed, with construction of the segment from Kerens to a point north of the Randolph County/Tucker County border (but not all the way to Parsons) scheduled to begin in mid-2016.

Work on bridges along the segment began in 2018. In June 2020, the U.S. Department of Transportation awarded funding for the Kerens–Parsons section. In early 2021, a paving contract was awarded, and completion of the segment was originally expected to occur in late 2023, though the anticipated completion date was later pushed back to the 2025 summer and then to the 2025 fall before being pushed back yet again to a date between the 2026 spring and late 2027. Finally, an 11.4-mile section of this segment, stretching from US 219 to an interchange with West Virginia Route 72 just north of Parsons, was opened to the public on June 22, 2026. Construction on the remaining section to US 219 just east of Parsons, which includes a bridge over the Cheat River, is anticipated to finish by June 2028.

==== Phase 3: Parsons to Davis ====
Phase III is a nine-mile (14 km) expressway from two miles (3.2 km) east of Parsons to immediately east of Davis along West Virginia Route 93 within Tucker County.

On December 4, 2002, the Supplemental Draft Environmental Impact Statement was approved after additional Environmental investigations were completed. The additional analysis was a result of the West Virginia Northern Flying Squirrel, a federally endangered species that was discovered in the vicinity. A public hearing was held on February 6, 2003, at the Blackwater Lodge in Davis, with comments on the meeting turned in by April 22. The Thomas-Davis city council had until June 19 to review the situation. The Supplemental Final Environmental Impact Statement was expected to be approved on the segment in June 2005, with the FHWA expected to sign the Amended Record of Decision in August 2005, however, the discovery of the West Virginia Northern Flying Squirrel delayed the project; WVDOH had to conduct additional environmental investigations.

The Supplemental Final Environmental Impact Statement (SFEIS) was approved in 2007. However, a reevaluation of the SFEIS is underway, specifically for updated endangered species surveys. The issuance of the Amended Record of Decision (AROD) is to be determined. Final design is anticipated to begin in 2025, and construction is scheduled to begin in 2031.

==== Phase 4: Davis to Bismarck ====
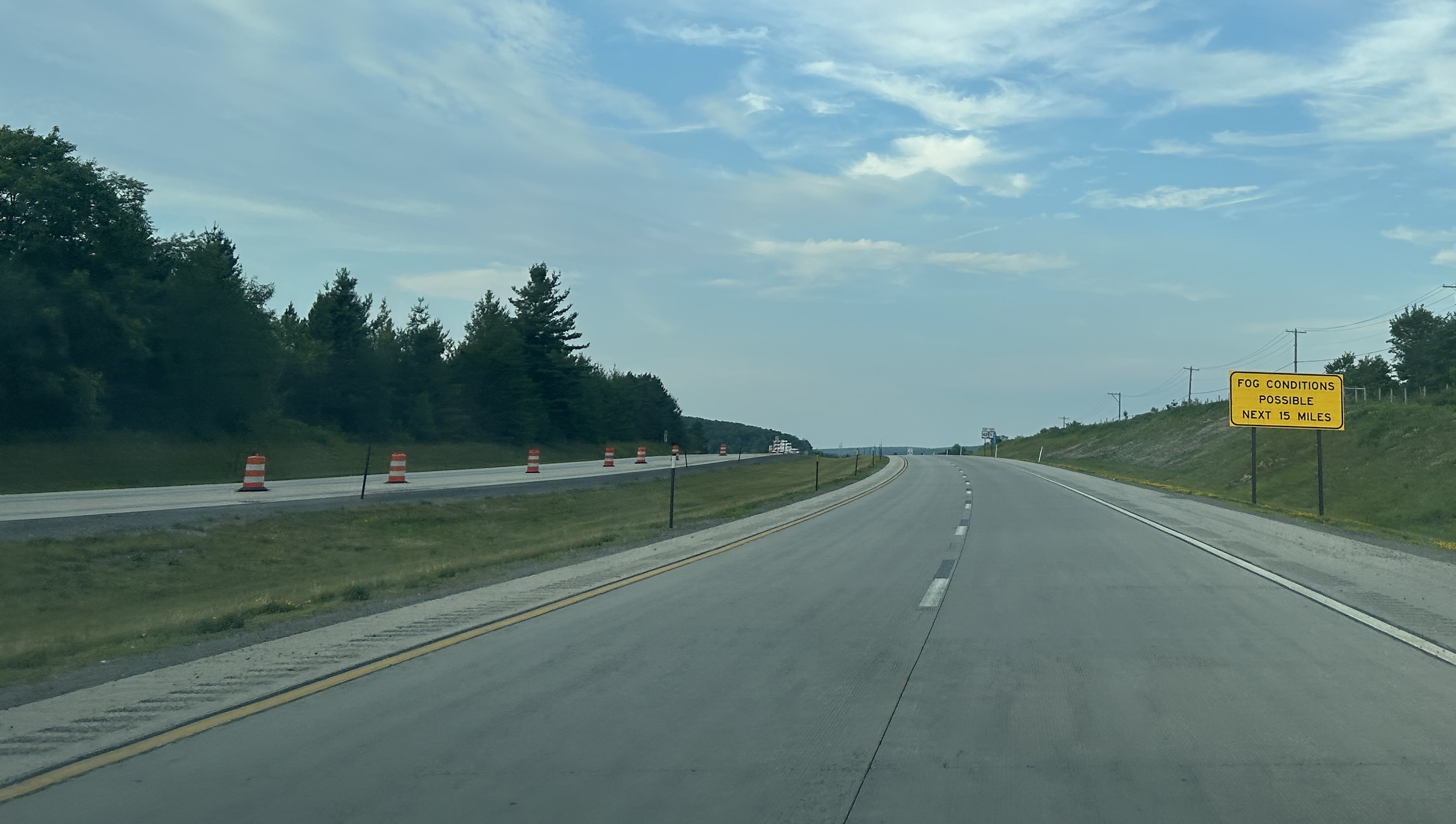
The start of the eastern section of Corridor H in Davis

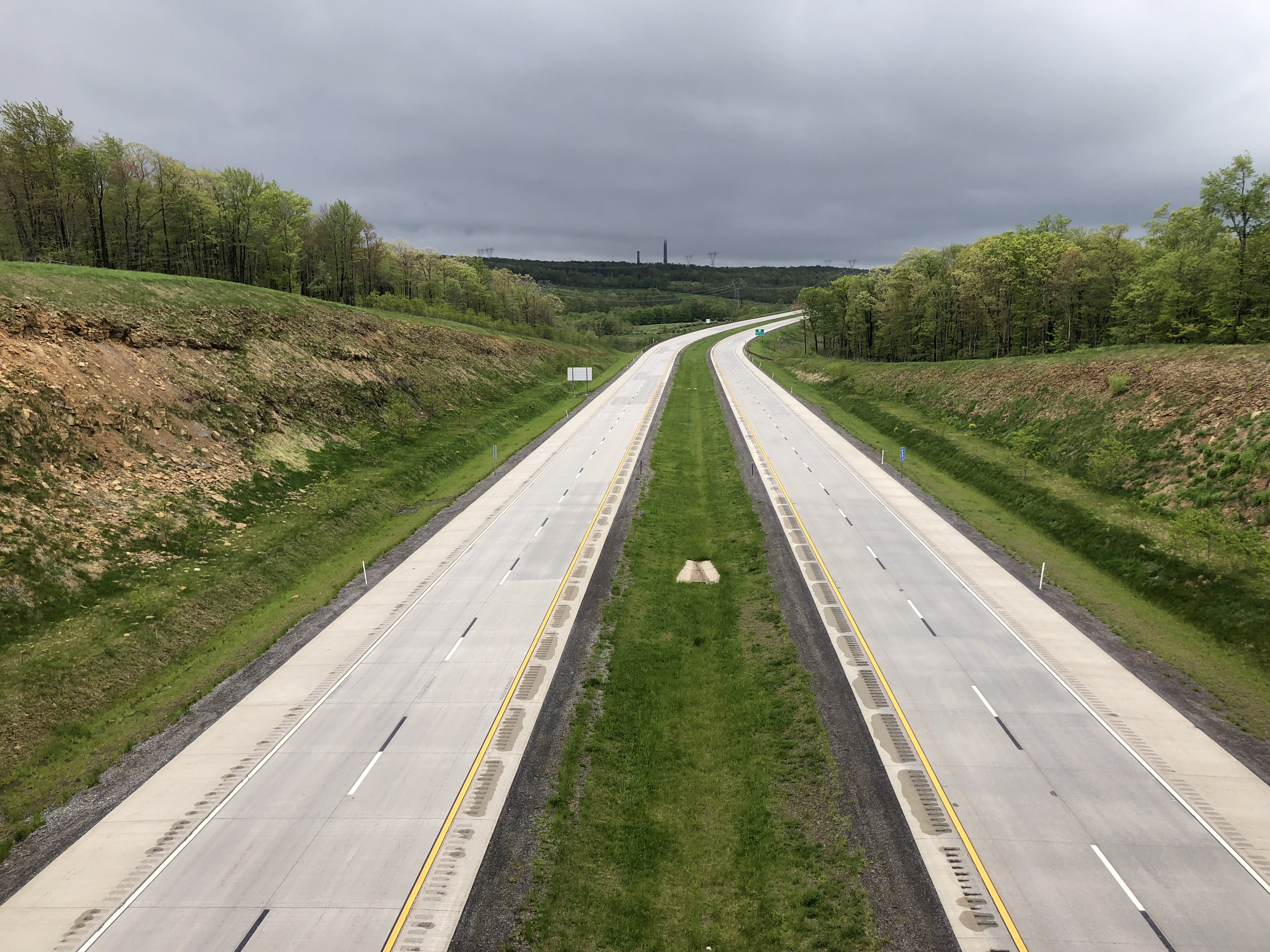
US 48 near Bismarck

This 16.5-mile (26.6 km) segment of Corridor H stretches through Tucker and Grant counties. The alignment runs from West Virginia Route 93, 0.7 miles (1.1 km) east of West Virginia Route 32 near Davis to Bismarck near the intersection of West Virginia Route 42 and West Virginia Route 93. The Federal Highway Administration issued a record of decision on March 23, 2001, that cleared the way for design, right-of-way purchases, and construction for this segment. A contract was awarded in December 2010 to Trumbull Corporation for the construction of 6.2 miles of Corridor H, from the existing corridor at Bismarck in Grant County to the WV 93 connector at Mount Storm in Grant County; this section opened by November 2014. A contract was awarded in August 2012 to JF Allen for the construction of the remaining 9.9 miles portion of the Davis to Bismarck section, from east of WV 32 to the WV 93 Connector at Mount Storm, and this section opened in November 2016.

==== Phase 5: Bismarck to Forman ====
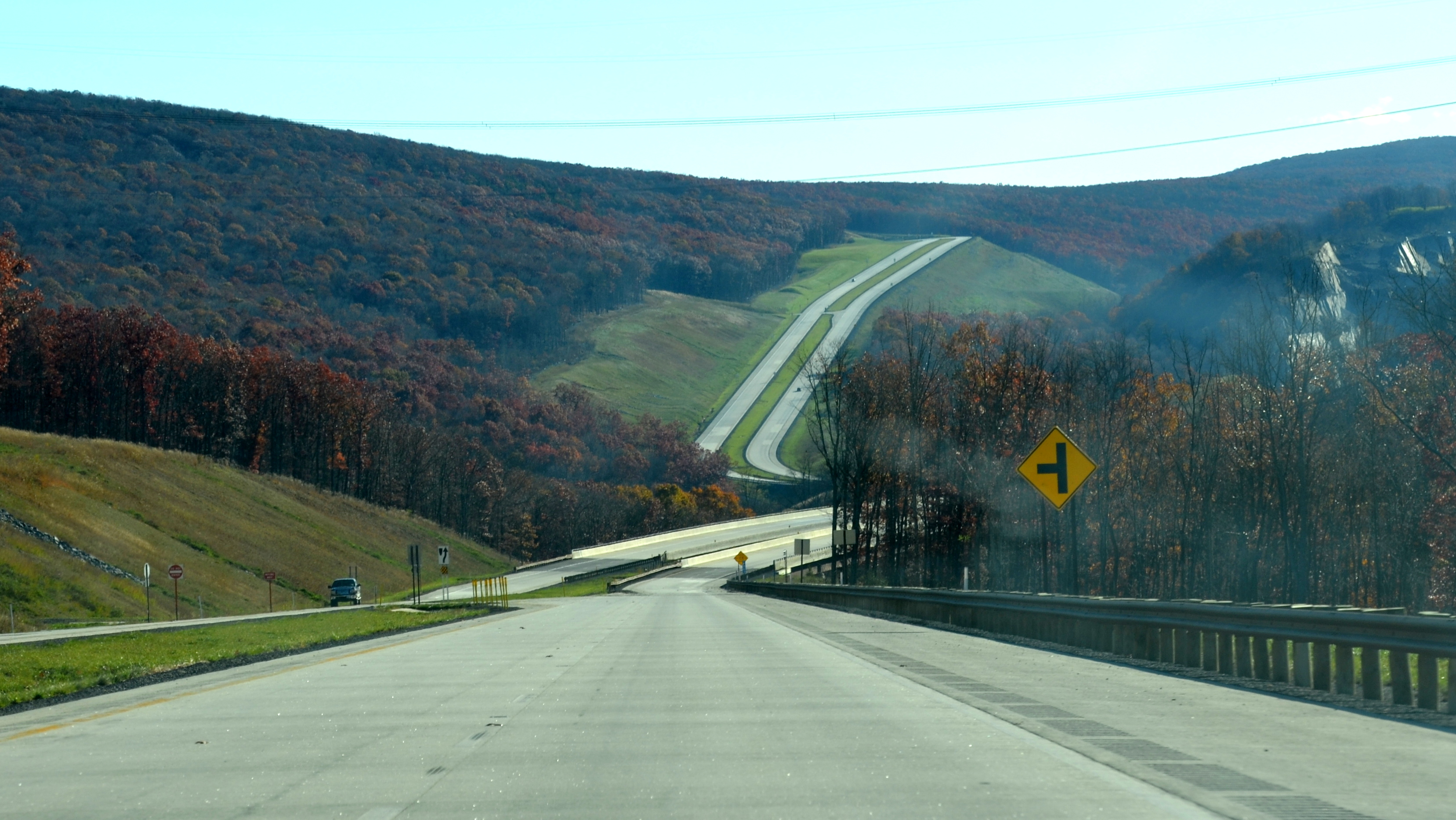
US 48 descends the Allegheny Front near the Greenland Gap.

This completed section totals 14 miles (23 km) within Grant County.

The record of decision was issued in July 2001. The original timeline was to begin acquiring right-of-way in June 2003, bid contracts in August 2004 and begin construction in September 2004 with a completion date in September 2006. Greenland Gap activists, however, began documenting the Gap's civil war history and natural features and successfully persuaded the West Virginia Department of Highways to move the alignment 1/4 of a mile away from the Gap. This spared several houses in a neighboring village and reduced the effect the highway would have on the Gap. A one-mile (1.6 km) access road between the village of Greenland and West Virginia Route 93 was eliminated and an interchange was moved from between Greenland and West Virginia Route 93 to two miles (3.2 km) north of Scherr for West Virginia Route 93.

Construction began in spring 2007 and completed in November 2013. The section from County Route 3 east to Forman and Moorefield opened in October 2010. A further section from WV 93 to CR 3 opened on October 23, 2012. The final section, from WV 93 near Scherr to the WV 42 connector at Bismarck, opened November 22, 2013.

==== Phase 6: Forman to Moorefield ====
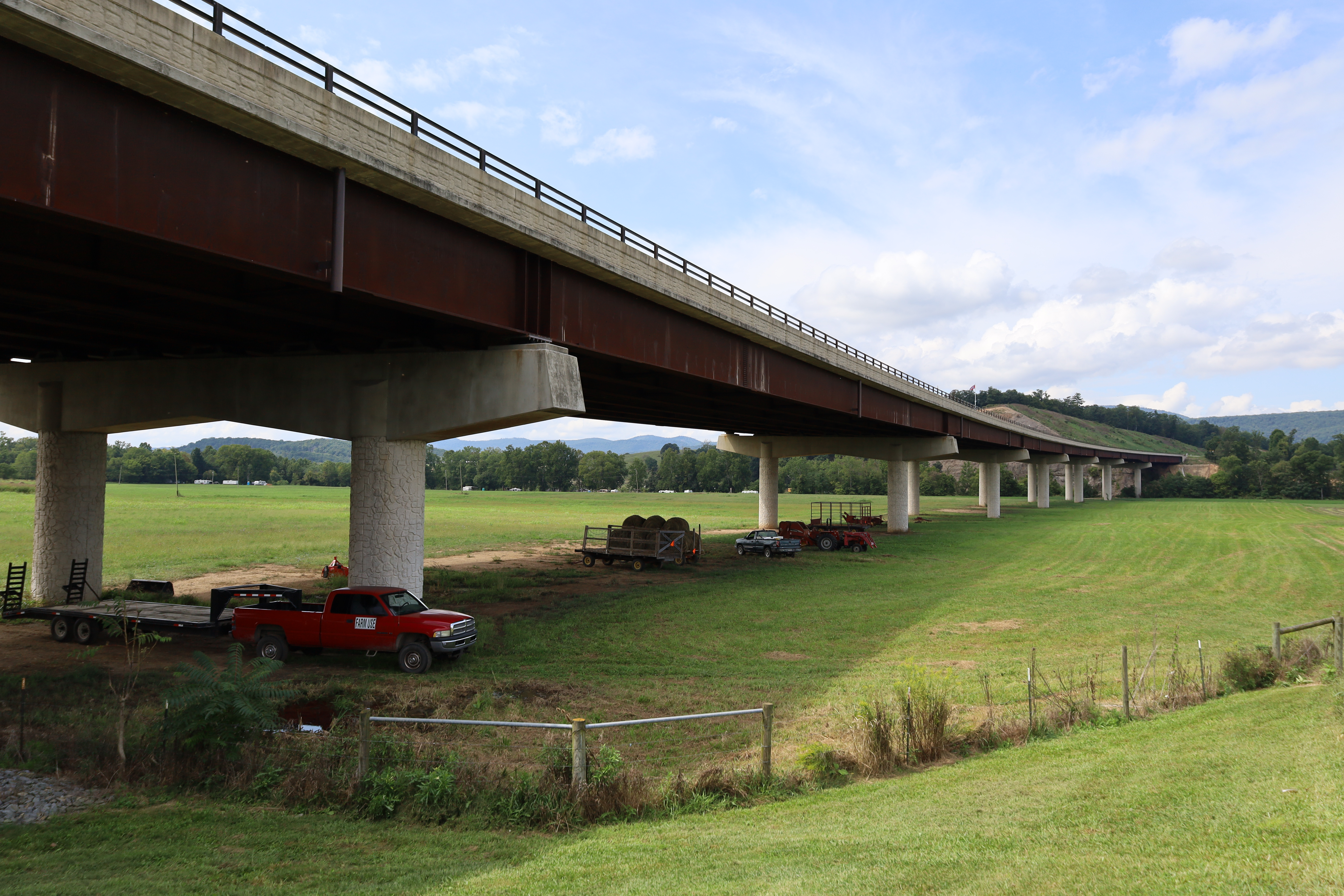
US 48 crosses the South Branch Potomac River over the Richard Lee "Dickie" Moyers Veterans Memorial Bridge at Moorefield.

The sixth phase in Corridor H's completion from Elkins to the state line, it travels through Grant and Hardy counties for a total length of 16 miles (26 km). This phase also includes three miles (4.8 km) of upgraded highway from US 220 to WV 55 just east of Moorefield; the mainlines for Corridor H are 13.8 miles (22.2 km).

The first section of this phase to open was a three-mile (5 km) four-lane highway from US 220 to the WV 55 interchange in November 2005. In August 2005, two grade and drain contracts were awarded on both sides of the South Branch Potomac River, with construction beginning that September. Construction completed on both contracts on the spring of 2007.

In July 2006, two grade and drain contracts were awarded west of the South Branch Potomac River.

On August 8, 2006, it was announced that 1.75 miles (2.82 km) were to be graded for paving at a cost of $23,747,933. This segment began construction in September and was completed in August 2008.

During the same month, South Branch Potomac River Bridge contract was awarded. The $30,884,656 contract, located just north of Moorefield, will contain a single eight-span 2,135 ft (651 m) steel girder bridge over the South Branch of the Potomac and a seven-span crossing over the adjacent floodplain. The bridge will utilize 4,300 tons of steel. Construction began in September with a completion date set for August 1, 2009.

The section from Moorefield to Knobley Road, west of Forman, was opened in late October 2010.

==== Phase 7: Moorefield to Baker ====
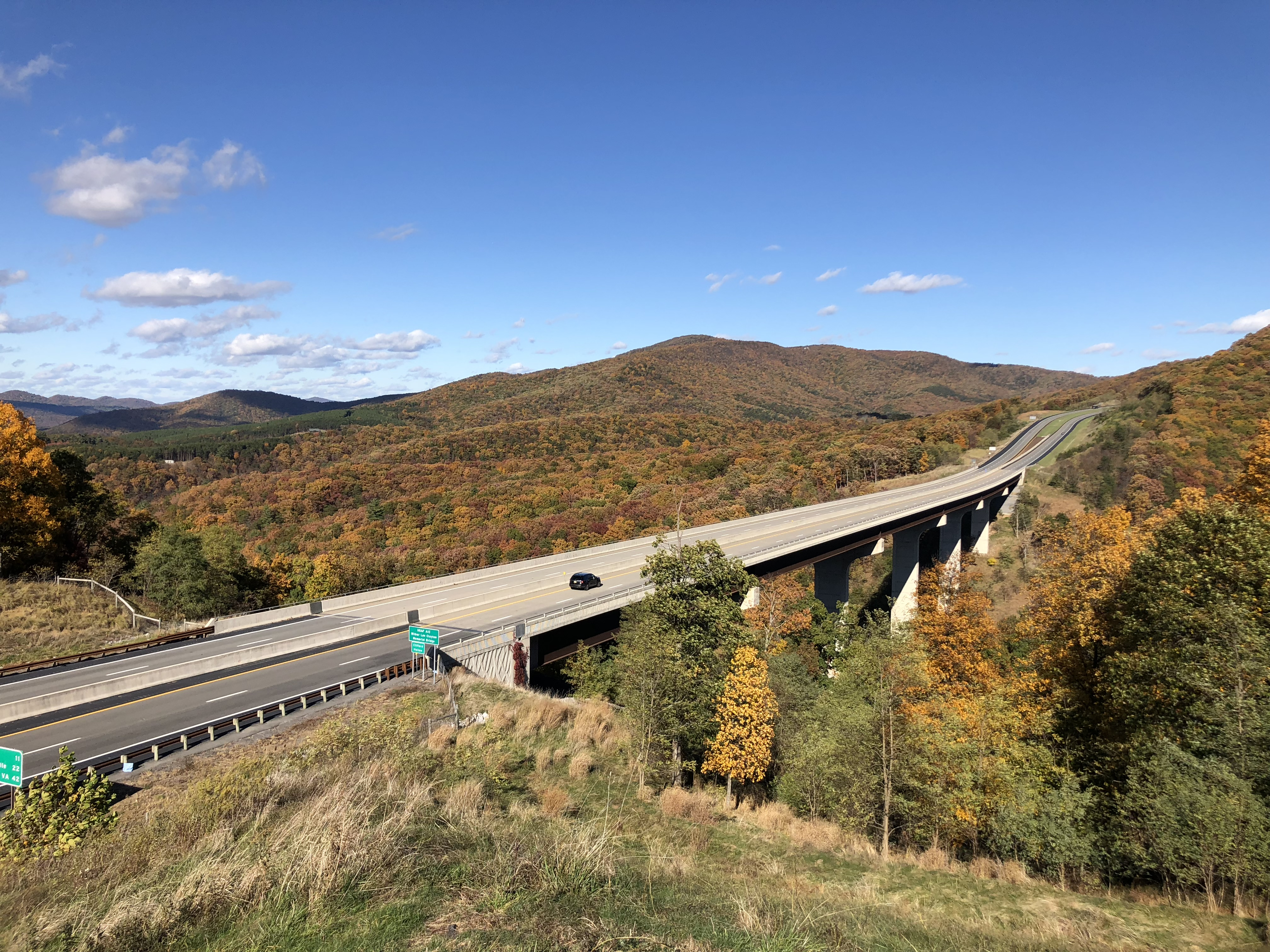
US 48 crosses the Clifford Hollow Bridge.

On May 31, 2000, ground was broken on the Moorefield to Baker section of Corridor H. Nearly 1,000 supporters were present.

On June 1, 2000, the Advisory Council on Historic Preservation (ACHP) informed the "West Virginia Division of Highways that it has made a determination of the effects of an alternative alignment of Corridor H near Moorefield on historic properties." Sam Beverage, acting Secretary for the Department of Transportation, stated that the Meadows and the P.W. Inkeep House were both to the alignment chosen for Corridor H but would not be impacted.

June 5, 2000, was the starting date for two segments in Hardy county. 1.62 miles (2.61 km) of partial controlled-access highway in the first segment, totaling $20,746,510 included 2,810,416 cubic yards (2,148,717 m³) of excavation, three access roads to farms, two structural plate drainage pipes and a six-span prestressed concrete beam bridge over Lick Run and CR 6.

Another segment at a cost of $12,499,009 was let to construction as well. 1.7 miles (2.7 km) of highway would extend the first segment of Phase 7 to just south of the Baker interchange. This included 1,963,415 cubic yards (1,501,138 m³) of excavation, one farm access road, two structural plate drainage pipes and two out of the four ramps for the Baker interchange.

On August 30, 2000, 1.09 miles (1.75 km) of four-lane divided highway was let to construction. It stretched from CR 23/4 to CR 8 and had a price tag of $11.4 million.

On September 28, 2000, the Department of Transportation announced that the construction of a four-lane partial controlled-access highway connecting West Virginia Route 55 to the Clifford Hollow Bridge would involve the construction of two bridges and 2.21 miles (3.56 km) of roadway. The cost for this segment was $29.6 million. A second project would connect the Clifford Hollow Bridge to county route 1 and involve 1.96 miles (3.15 km) of construction at a cost of $15.2 million.

A 1.09-mile (1.75 km) segment of roadway was let to construction on October 18, 2000, at a cost of $9,864,718. This segment stretched from CR 23/4 to CR 8.

The final segment of Phase 7 was let to construction on November 2, 2000, for the Clifford Hollow Bridge at a cost of $17.8 million. It was completed in October 2003.

A three-mile (5 km) segment of highway from County Route 1 to County Route 23/9 opened to traffic in August 2002. On November 17, 2002, a five-mile (8 km) section of roadway opened from County Route 23/9 to the Baker interchange. With the completion of the Clifford Hollow Bridge in October 2003, the 14-mile (23 km) segment of Corridor H through Hardy county between Moorefield and Baker was opened to traffic.

==== Phase 8: Baker to Wardensville ====
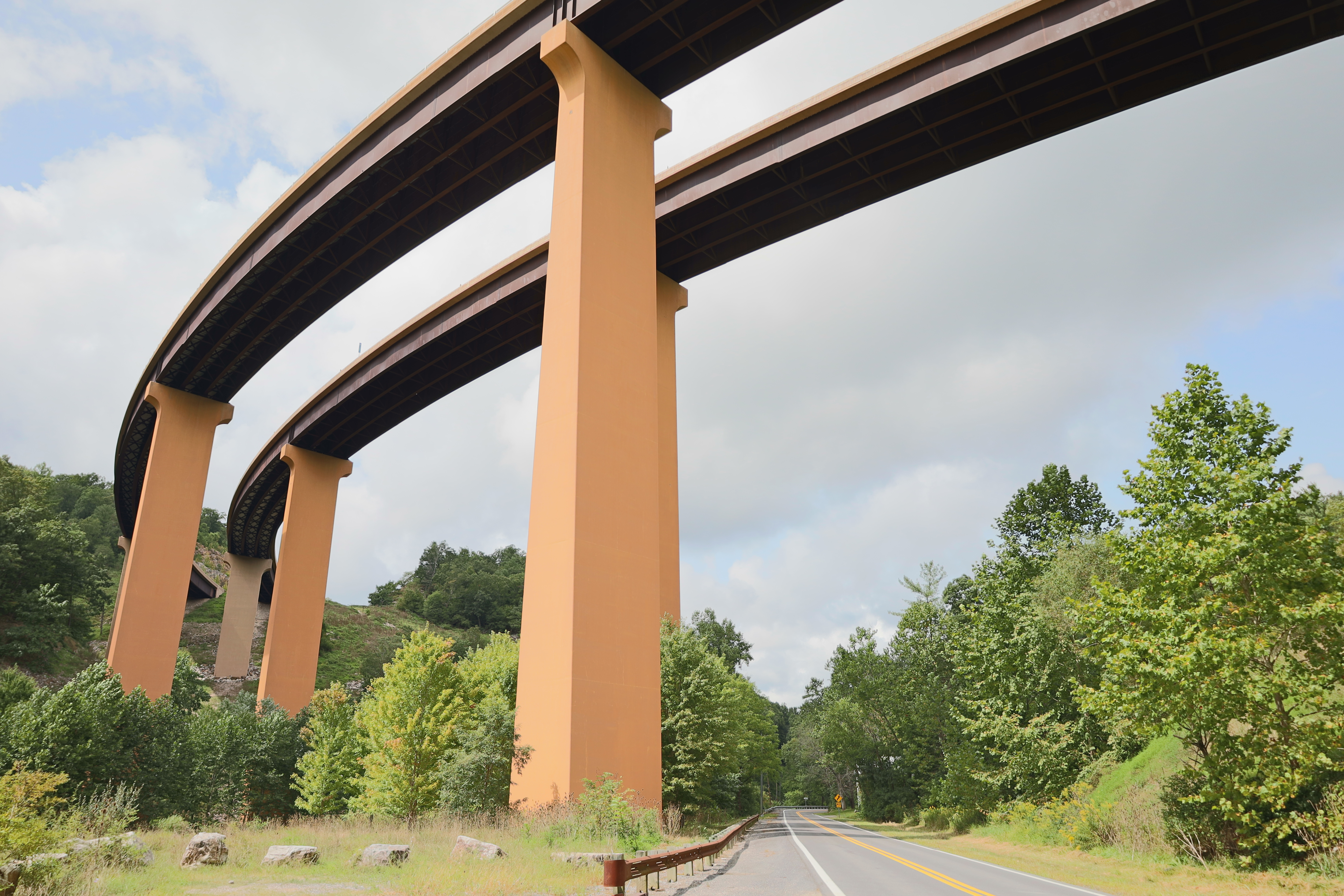
US 48 crossing of the Lost River at McCauley. Old Route 55, which it replaced, is visible beneath it.

In December 2000, the Federal Highway Administration issued the Record of Decision on this 6.7-mile (10.8 km) segment of Corridor H.

A construction contract was awarded on October 1, 2001, to construct a segment of Phase 8 from Hanging Rock to County Route 23/8 in Hardy county. This segment is located just east of the Lost River bridge near McCauley and cost $12,891,522.

Another contract was awarded on December 5, 2001, at a total of $18,549,091 to construct 2.68 miles (4.31 km) of Corridor H from County Route 23/8 to the west approach of the Lost River bridge. Grading and drainage required 3.3 million cubic yards (2,500,000 m³) of earthwork, including over 1 million cubic yards (800,000 m³) of "borrow" material and several 60-inch (1,500 mm) pipes to carry small streams underneath the roadway. A three-span fabricated steel girder bridge was constructed to carry the four-lane divided highway over Sauerkraut Run.

December 21, 2001, was another important day, as a 1.45-mile (2.33 km) section was awarded at a cost of $25,019,472. It stretched from the Baker interchange and extended to the west side of the bridge crossing the Lost River in Hardy county. The remaining two incomplete ramps at the Baker interchange were completed.

On March 4, 2002, the Department of Highways awarded a contract to construct a 1.08-mile (1.74 km) segment of Corridor H at a cost of $15,858,045 that extended from Lost River Sinks to County Route 23/12. This included landscaping for the historic Hott House as part of the construction mitigation program and involved the construction of a connection to existing West Virginia Route 55. This segment required 4.3 million cubic yards (3,200,000 m³) of earthwork, drainage, paving, signing and pavement markings. It was completed in the fall of 2003.

The completion of the Lost River Bridge at McCauley signaled the end of construction on phase 8. The segment opened to traffic in mid-October 2006.

==== Phase 9: Wardensville to the Virginia state line ====
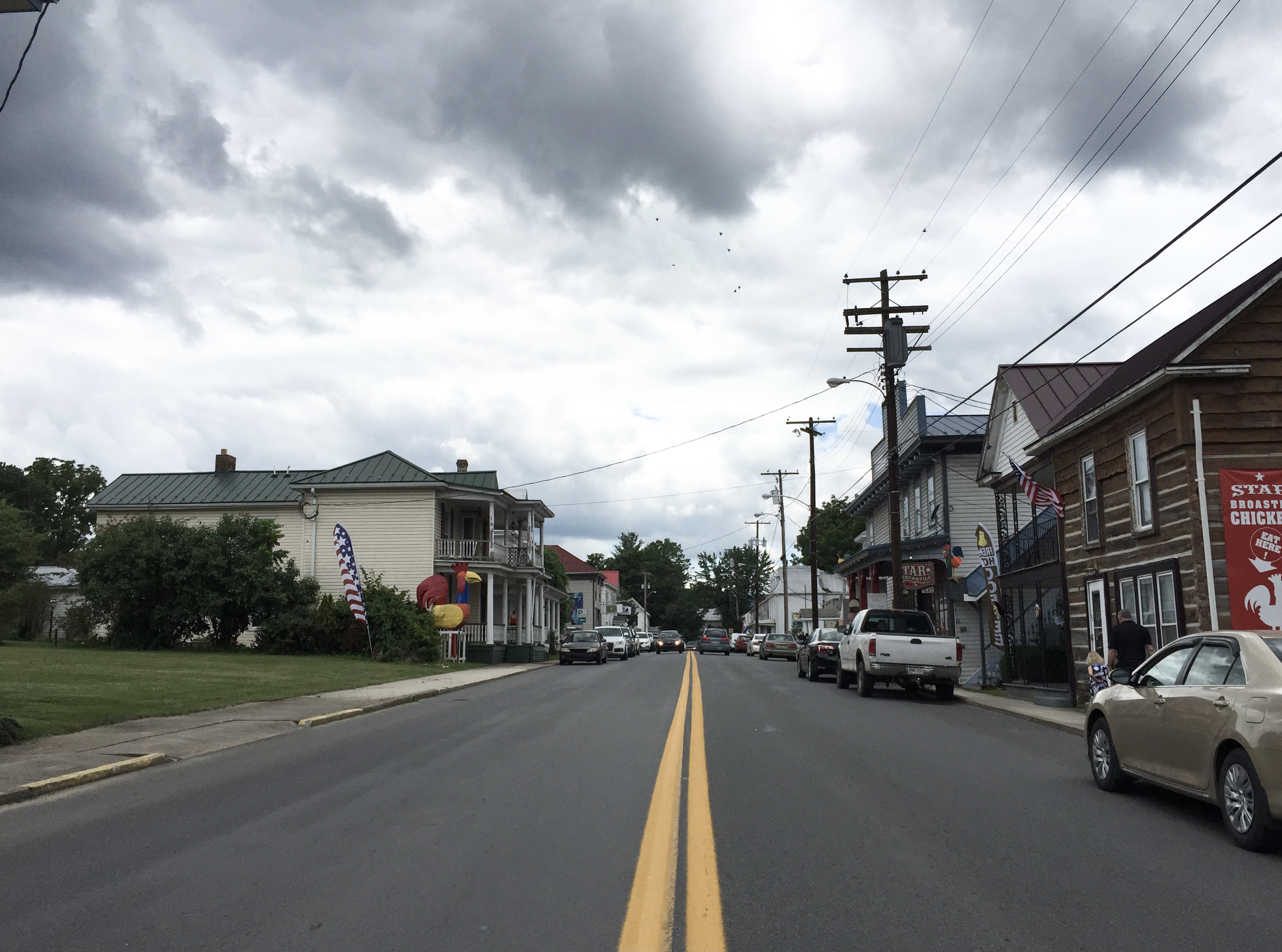
US 48 forming the main street through Wardensville.

This 5.5-mile (8.9 km) phase of Corridor H (US 48) stretches from Wardensville to West Virginia Route 55 at the Virginia state line.

As part of the agreement, the Federal Highway Administration and the West Virginia Department of Transportation would defer construction, along with final design and right-of-way acquisition, on the 5.5-mile (8.9 km) section of roadway between Wardensville and the Virginia state line for as long as 20 years. This delay could be shortened if Virginia approves their 14-mile (23 km) section of Corridor H (US 48) between the West Virginia state line and Interstate 81, if traffic increases significantly on West Virginia Route 55 between Wardensville and the state line, or if required to ensue eligibility for Appalachian highway corridor funding.

The Amended Record of Decision was approved on May 16, 2003.

=== West Virginia state line to Interstate 81 in Virginia ===
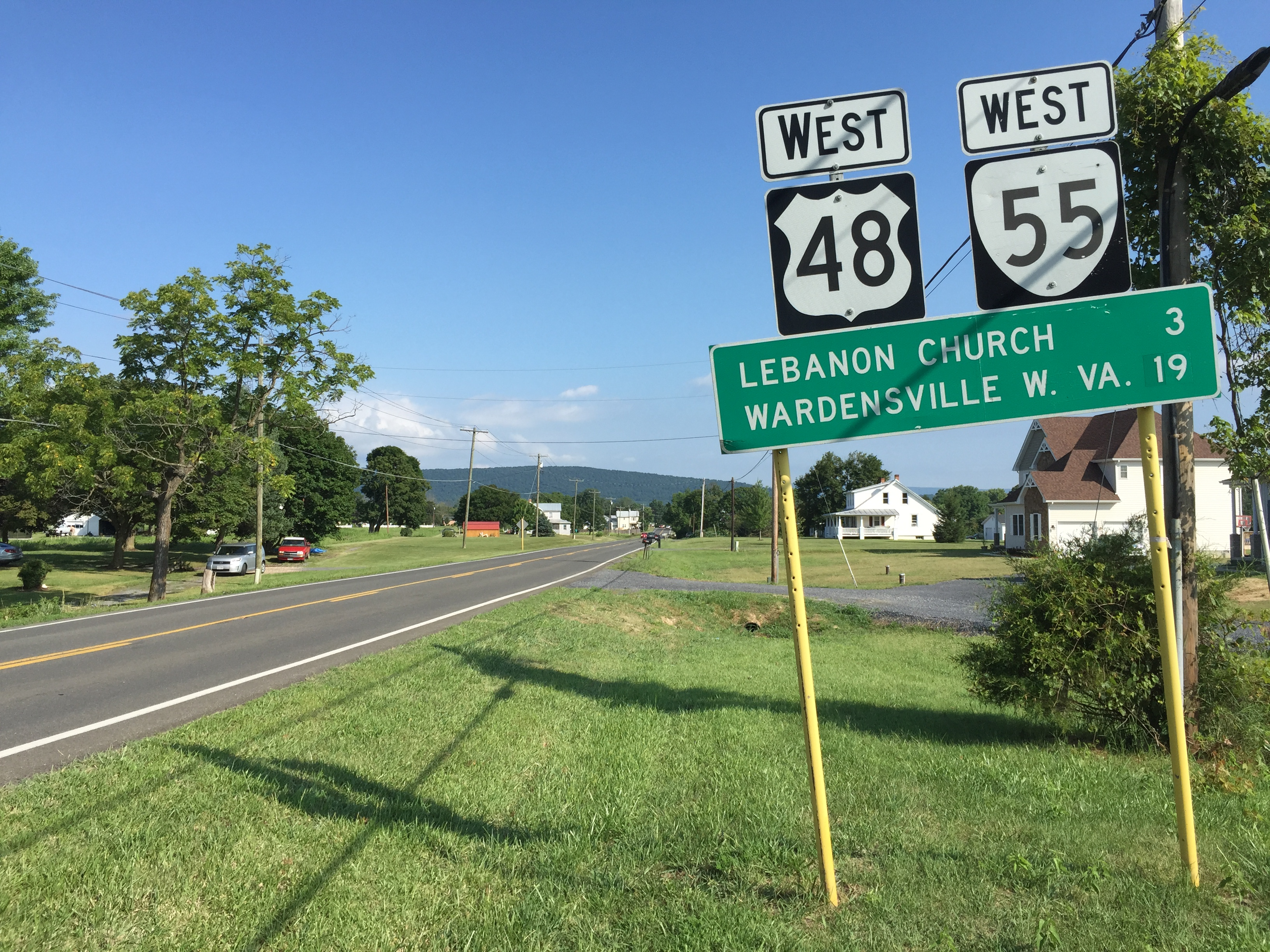
View west along US 48 and SR 55 in Clary, Virginia

No work or planning has started on this segment of Corridor H yet.

In April 2003, new US 48 signs were installed along State Route 55 in Virginia. While State Route 55 will not be the final alignment of Corridor H through this region, it will be a temporary transition as West Virginia completes their portions to the state line.

Virginia also designated State Route 55 a Virginia Scenic Byway. Plans are in the works with VDOT to maintain the existing facility and continue to make spot improvements.

== Related projects ==
=== Rails to Trails ===
The former Western Maryland Railroad that stretched through eastern West Virginia was opened in 2003, only instead of carrying train cars, it will serve hikers and bikers. This "rail to trail" project was built in conjunction with the construction of Corridor H. It includes parking areas, restroom facilities, and walking trails. These projects will total approximately 20 miles (32 km) and cost around $1.5 million. Two segments that were constructed from Parsons to Montrose and from Montrose to Elkins were awarded on February 20, 2001. It was named the Allegheny Highland Trail.

=== Environmental measures ===
The Division of Highways received the Federal Highway Administration's 2001 Environmental Award in the cultural resources category for the educational tools and web sites based on the Reed Farmstead archaeological dig on Corridor H.

State Highway Engineer Joe Deneault explained when the 200-year-old farm was discovered, the Division of Highways wanted to share the process of how the Hardy County family's home would be uncovered and preserved. "We wanted to share this process with the public," Deneault said. " The Reed Farmstead was an amazing discovery and we decided that a video and web sites would be the best way to share this extensive archaeological dig with area residents. As the project progressed, it was clear that this could be an important educational tool for students as well."

An educational video was produced that illustrated the step-by-step process in the identification and preservation procedures taken by WVDOH. The video was shown for 60 days on the Corridor H web site and a videocassette was mailed to every school teaching grades eighth through twelfth in the state.

The WVDOH also developed two web sites based on the project:, that offers the history of the farm and details about the dig, and, which is an interactive site for children.

The award was presented to the WVDOH and to the two consultants, Michael Baker Jr., Inc. and Charles Ryan Associates, working on this project at a ceremony in Washington, D. C. on April 20.

=== Connecting highway ===
Maryland and West Virginia have begun planning an upgraded U.S. Route 220, possibly as an extension of Corridor O, to connect Corridor H to Interstate 68 near Cumberland, Maryland. Committees in Cumberland, Keyser, and Moorefield have been created to discuss the highway and thus far several plans have been established but one individual plan has not yet been chosen.

== Major intersections ==
State	County	Location	mi	km	Destinations	Notes
West Virginia	Lewis	Weston	0.00	0.00	US 33 west / US 119 north / I-79 – Weston, Charleston, Clarksburg	Western terminus; I-79 exit 99; road continues as US 33 west/US 119 north
West Virginia	Upshur	Buckhannon	11.5	18.5	CR 12 (Main Street)	Interchange; eastbound exit only
West Virginia	Upshur	Buckhannon	12.0	19.3	US 119 north / WV 20 – Buckhannon, Philippi	Interchange; east end of US 119 overlap
West Virginia	Barbour	No major junctions				
West Virginia	Randolph		28.2	45.4	US 250 / WV 92 north – Philippi	West end of US 250/WV 92 overlaps
West Virginia	Randolph	Aggregates	31.5	50.7	WV 92 south (Harrison Avenue) – Crystal Springs	East end of WV 92 overlap
West Virginia	Randolph	Elkins	35.0	56.3	US 33 east / US 219 / US 250 south – Elkins	East end of US 33/US 250 overlaps; west end of US 219 overlap
West Virginia	Randolph	Kerens	40.1	64.5	US 219 north (Kerens Road) – Parsons	East end of US 219 overlap
West Virginia	Tucker		48.5	78.1	To US 219 – Montrose, Parsons	Connector road
West Virginia	Tucker		51.7	83.2	WV 72 – Parsons	Interchange; temporary east end of western section
West Virginia	Tucker				US 219 south – Parsons	Proposed interchange; west end of US 219 overlap
West Virginia	Tucker				US 219 north – Thomas	Proposed east end of US 219 overlap
West Virginia	Tucker	Davis			WV 32 – Thomas, Davis	Proposed interchange
West Virginia	Tucker	Davis	65	105	WV 93 west	Temporary west end of eastern section; west end of WV 93 overlap; continues beyond temporary end as WV 93 west
West Virginia	Grant		77.2	124.2	WV 93 east	East end of WV 93 overlap
West Virginia	Grant		78.5	126.3	WV 93 – Bismarck	Interchange
West Virginia	Grant		80.9	130.2	To WV 42 – Mount Storm	
West Virginia	Grant		84.4	135.8	To WV 93 – Scherr, Keyser	
West Virginia	Grant	Forman	95	153	CR 5 (Patterson Creek Road)	Interchange
West Virginia	Hardy	Moorefield	106.4	171.2	US 220 / WV 28 / WV 55 west – Moorefield	Interchange; west end of WV 55 overlap
West Virginia	Hardy		109	175	East Moorefield (Old Route 55)	Interchange
West Virginia	Hardy	Baker	128	206	WV 29 / WV 259 south – Baker	Interchange; west end of WV 259 overlap
West Virginia	Hardy		137	220	WV 259 north to US 50	east end of WV 259 overlap
West Virginia–Virginia line	Hardy–Shenandoah county line	Great North Mountain	143 0.00	230 0.00	WV 55 ends / SR 55 begins	East end of WV 55 overlap; west end of SR 55 overlap
Virginia	Shenandoah	Lebanon Church	10.0	16.1	SR 628 (Middle Road) to US 11 – Winchester	
Virginia	Shenandoah		11.7	18.8	SR 623 – Mount Olive	
Virginia	Shenandoah		14.0	22.5	I-81 / SR 55 east to I-66 east – Strasburg, Winchester, Woodstock	Eastern terminus; I-81 exit 296; east end of SR 55 overlap
1.000 mi = 1.609 km; 1.000 km = 0.621 mi: Concurrency terminus; Incomplete access; Route transition; Unopened

== Previous uses of the designation ==
US 48 is one of the newest additions to the United States Numbered Highway system, having been commissioned in 2002. Before this designation, sections east of Moorefield, West Virginia, to I-81 were known as West Virginia SR 55 and SR 55, and sections north of Elkins, West Virginia, were known as US 219. West Virginia has US 48 signed sparsely within its borders for unimproved sections of the planned highway.

US 48 is one of the few U.S. Route numbers to be used three times for three separate roadways. The first use of US 48 was in the 1920s, in Northern California, before being absorbed by US 50. The original "US 48" was one of the original routes in the United States Numbered Highways system. Assigned in 1926, it ran between US 99 at French Camp, California, outside Stockton, and US 101 at San Jose, California. By 1931, however, the route had been deleted. Most of the route later became part of US 50. US 48 was the first US highway to be deleted in California.

Then, US 48 was designated for what is now I-68 before it entered the Interstate Highway System. Constructed as Corridor E of the ADHS as a replacement for a particularly primitive section of US 40, it was initially numbered US 48 when construction began in 1965; in 1991, however, it was redesignated as an interstate route.

== See also ==
- Clifford Hollow Bridge
