= Virginia State Route 55 =

State highway in northern Virginia, US

State Route 55

Route information
- Maintained by VDOT
- Length: 64.71 mi (104.14 km)
- Existed: 1928–present
- Tourist routes: Virginia Byway

Major junctions
- West end: US 48 / WV 55 near Star Tannery
- I-81 / US 48 in Strasburg; US 11 in Strasburg; US 340 / US 522 in Front Royal; I-66 / US 17 in Marshall; SR 245 in The Plains; US 15 in Haymarket
- East end: US 29 / SR 619 in Gainesville

Location
- Country: United States
- State: Virginia
- Counties: Frederick, Shenandoah, Warren, Fauquier, Prince William

Highway system
- Virginia Routes; Interstate; US; Primary; Secondary; Byways; History; HOT lanes
← SR 54	SR 55	→ SR 56

State Route 55 (SR 55) is a primary state highway in the U.S. state of Virginia. Known for most of its length as John Marshall Highway, the state highway runs 64.71 miles (104.14 km) from the West Virginia state line, where the highway continues as West Virginia Route 55 (WV 55), east to U.S. Route 29 (US 29) in Gainesville. West of its interchange with Interstate 81 (I-81) in Strasburg, SR 55 runs concurrently with the easternmost portion of US 48 as part of Corridor H. East of Front Royal, the state highway serves as the local complement of I-66 as it passes through the towns of Marshall, The Plains, and Haymarket.

Most of SR 55 is a Virginia Byway.

== Route description ==
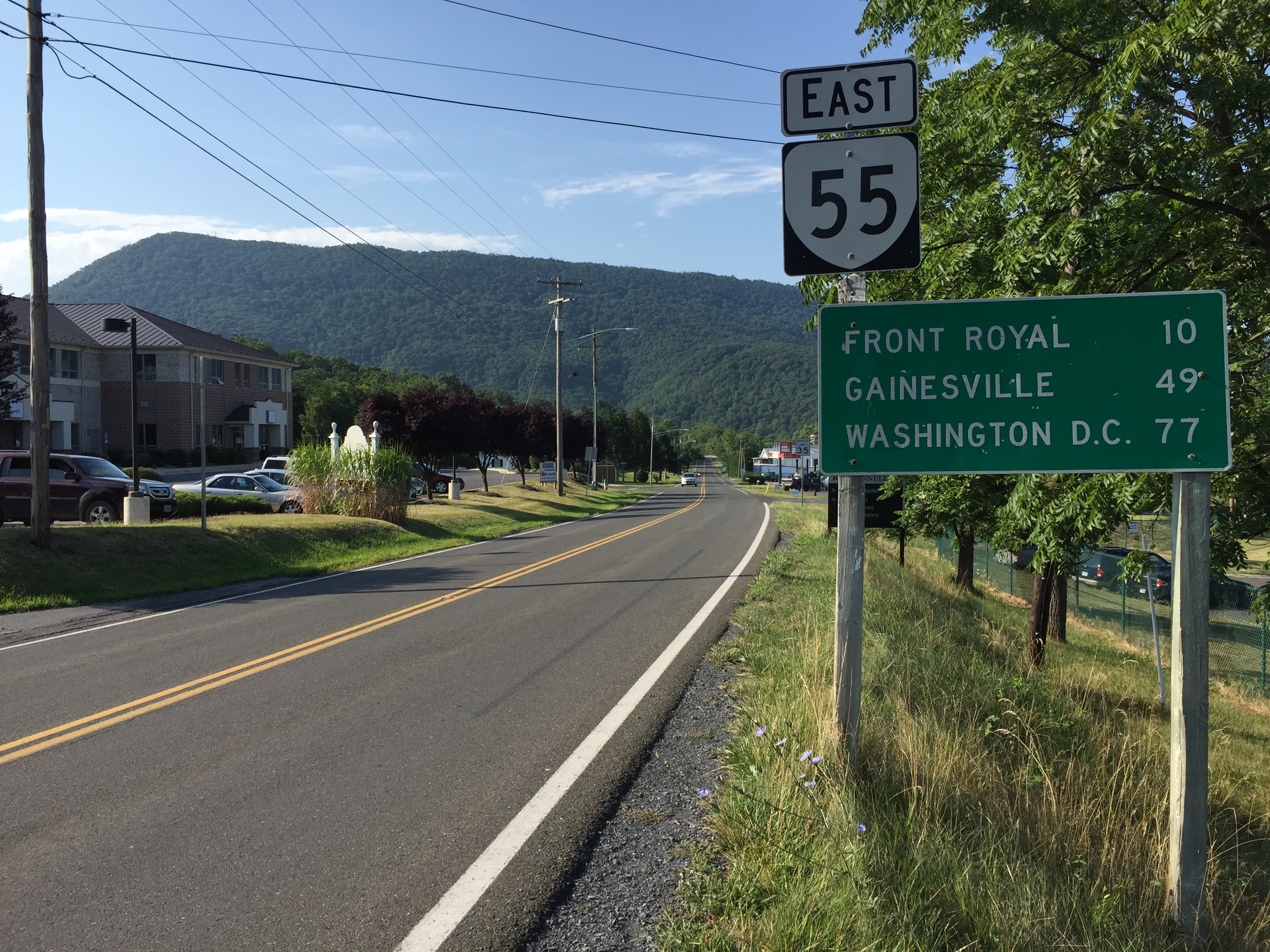
View east along SR 55 leaving Strasburg

SR 55 begins at the West Virginia state line at the highway's summit of Great North Mountain. The highway continues west toward Wardensville as US 48 and WV 55. SR 55 heads northeast as two-lane undivided Wardensville Pike through George Washington National Forest and descends the mountain to the hamlet of Star Tannery, where the highway leaves Frederick County by crossing Cedar Creek. The state highway, now named John Marshall Highway, passes around the northern end of Little North Mountain near the community of Wheatfield, where the highway turns south. SR 55 passes through the Shenandoah County communities of Lebanon Church and Clary on its way to a diamond interchange with I-81, which serves as US 48's eastern terminus. SR 55 continues south into the town of Strasburg, where the highway has a short concurrency with US 11 on Massanutten Street and passes under Norfolk Southern Railway's B-Line, which it crosses several more times due to the B-Line’s similar route, ending in Manassas. In the center of the town, US 11 and SR 55 head west and east, respectively, on King Street. The state highway passes under the B-Line again before reaching the eastern edge of town, where the highway becomes Front Royal Road and makes a curve to the south. SR 55 passes through an S-curve as it crosses the North Fork Shenandoah River into Warren County.

Just north of Signal Knob, the northernmost peak of Massanutten Mountain, SR 55 passes to the south side of the B-Line. The highway, now named Strasburg Road, crosses Passage Creek on its way to the Riverton area of the town of Front Royal at the confluence of the North Fork and South Fork Shenandoah River to form the Shenandoah River. In Riverton, SR 55 turns south onto Shenandoah Avenue and joins US 340 and US 522 in a triple concurrency. The four-lane undivided highway crosses the South Fork and passes through a pair of right-angle curves onto 14th Street and then Royal Avenue. Just north of downtown Front Royal, US 522 turns southeast onto Commerce Street; SR 55 and US 340 continue south as a two-lane undivided street through downtown. At the southern end of the town, US 340 continues south while the state highway turns east onto four-lane undivided South Street, gaining a center left-turn lane further east. East of US 522, SR 55 reduces to two lanes and leaves the town of Front Royal as John Marshall Highway. The state highway passes under the B-Line just before its junction with SR 79 (Apple Mountain Road), a very short connector with I-66. SR 55, I-66, and the B-Line follow Manassas Run to the community of Linden, where the thoroughfares intersect the Appalachian Trail, cross Blue Ridge Mountain at Manassas Gap, and enter Fauquier County.

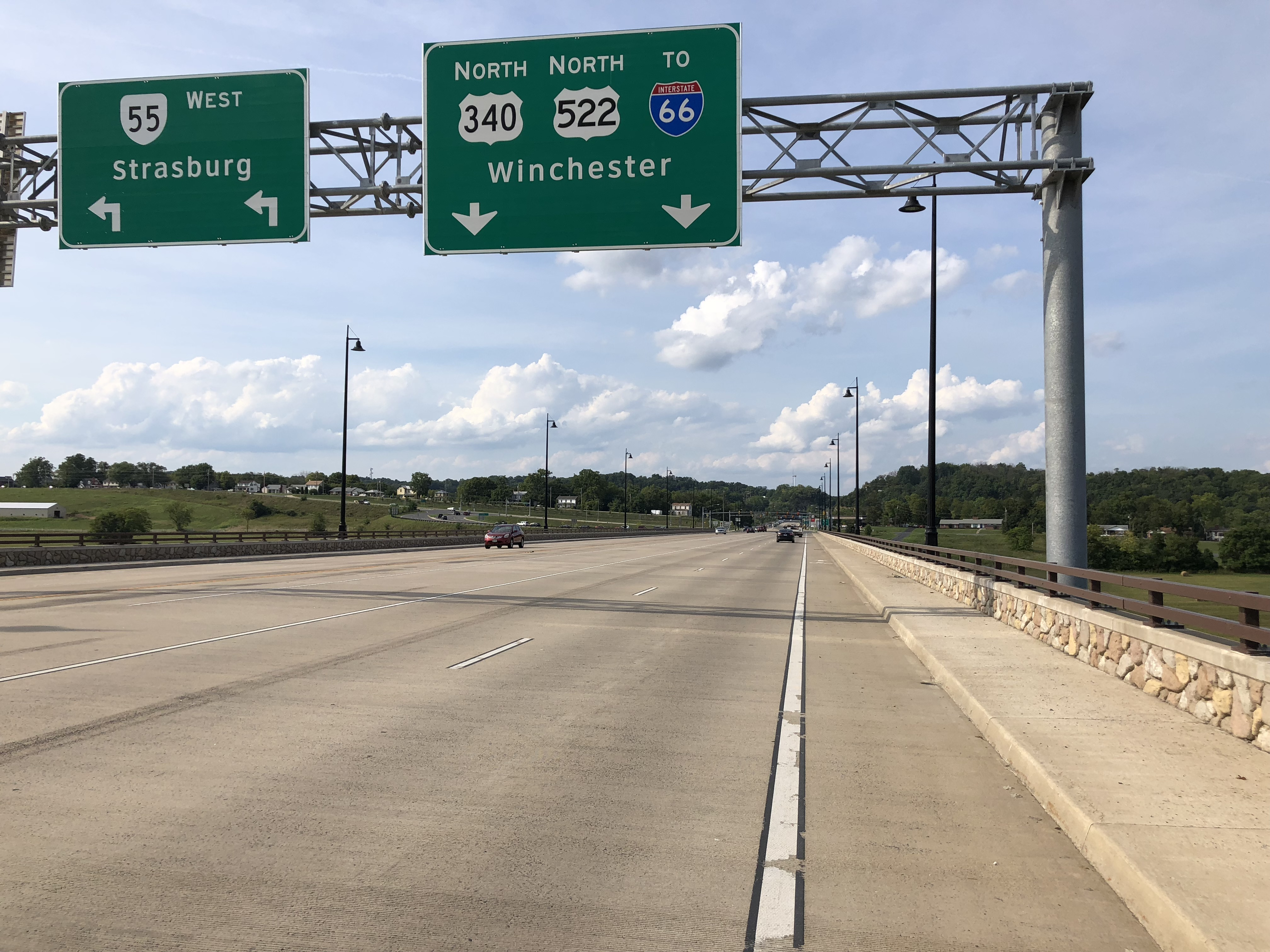
View north along US 340/522 and west along SR 55 departing Front Royal

SR 55 continues to parallel I-66 and the B-Line through the valley of Goose Creek, where they pass through Markham. The two highways leave Goose Creek and the B-Line west of Delaplane, where SR 55 veers away from I-66 temporarily and joins US 17 (Winchester Road) in a concurrency before the two highways merge onto I-66 near Oak Hill, the country estate of John Marshall. The highways are directly paralleled on the north by the highway's old alignment, Grove Lane. Just west of the town of Marshall, SR 55 exits I-66 at a diamond interchange onto Free State Road. SR 55, which is concurrent with US 17 Business, turns east onto Main Street at Grove Lane. In the center of town, US 17 Business heads south on Winchester Road opposite SR 710 (Rectortown Road) while SR 55 continues east on Main Street, which intersects the B-Line before leaving town. SR 55 continues east and becomes the Main Street of the town of The Plains, where the highway meets the B-Line at another grade crossing and intersects the northern end of SR 245 (Old Tavern Road). SR 55, I-66, and the B-Line follow Broad Run through the Bull Run Mountains at Thoroughfare Gap into Prince William County.

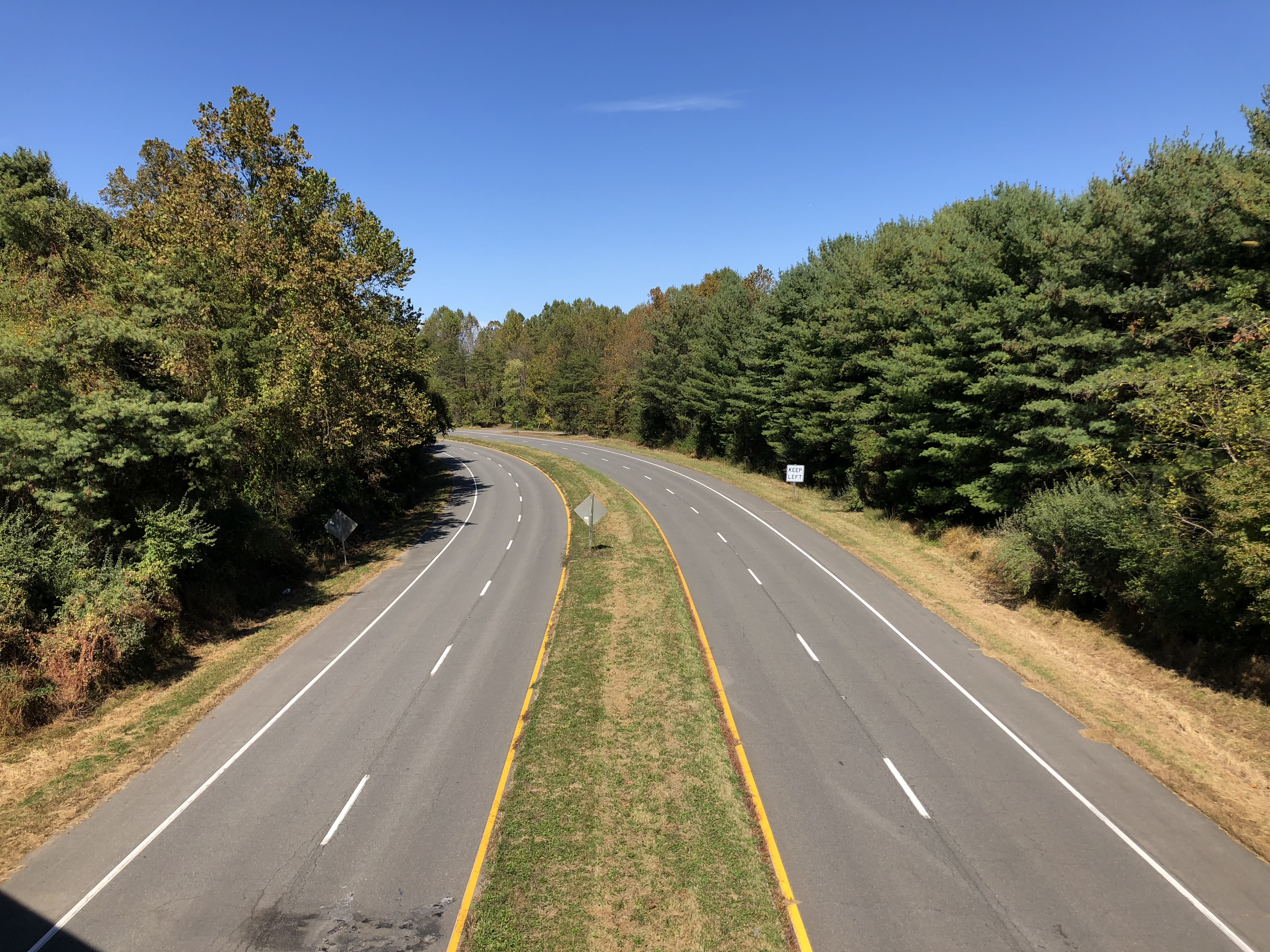
View west along SR 55 from I-66 east of The Plains

SR 55 crosses the B-Line again at the hamlet of Thoroughfare. The state highway intersects US 15 (James Madison Highway) just west of the town of Haymarket; in that town the highway is known as Washington Street. SR 55 continues southeast to Gainesville, where the highway reaches its eastern terminus. As of June 2011 SR 55 has been re-routed over the old Gallerher Road, and is now called John Marshall Highway. The US 29–SR 55 junction is the focus of a long-term project to provide grade separations between the B-Line (the last crossing by SR 55) and both the John Marshall Highway and US 29, and to construct an interchange between US 29, SR 55, and SR 619 (Linton Hall Road). The single-point urban interchange was completed in 2015.

== Major intersections ==
County	Location	mi	km	Destinations	Notes
Frederick		0.00	0.00	US 48 west / WV 55 west – Wardensville	West Virginia state line; western terminus; western end of US 48 concurrency
Shenandoah	Lebanon Church			SR 628 (Middle Road) to US 11 – Winchester	
Shenandoah		14.26	22.95	I-81 to I-66 east – Winchester, Woodstock US 48 ends	Exit 296 (I-81); eastern end of US 48 concurrency
Shenandoah	Strasburg	15.89	25.57	US 11 north (North Massanutten Street) to I-66 / I-81 – Winchester, Martinsburg	Western end of US 11 concurrency
Shenandoah	Strasburg	16.12	25.94	US 11 south (King Street) – Staunton	Eastern end of US 11 concurrency
Warren	Front Royal (Riverton)	26.40	42.49	US 340 north / US 522 north (North Shenandoah Avenue) to I-66 – Winchester, Berryville	Western end of US 340 / US 522 concurrency
Warren	Front Royal	27.78	44.71	US 522 south (North Commerce Avenue)	Eastern end of US 522 concurrency
Warren	Front Royal			Main Street	former SR 12 north
Warren	Front Royal	29.00	46.67	US 340 south (South Royal Avenue) – Shenandoah National Park, Skyline Drive	Eastern end of US 340 concurrency
Warren	Front Royal	29.54	47.54	US 522 (Commerce Avenue / Remount Road) to I-66 west	
Warren		34.24	55.10	SR 79 north (Apple Mountain Road) to I-66	Southern terminus of SR 79
Fauquier		44.50	71.62	US 17 north (Winchester Road) – Delaplane, Paris, Winchester, Sky Meadows State Park	Western end of US 17 concurrency
Fauquier		45.14	72.65	I-66 west – Front Royal, Strasburg	Western end of I-66 concurrency; SR 55 west follows exit 23
Fauquier		48.50	78.05	I-66 east / US 17 south / SR 721 (Free State Road) – Washington, Fredericksburg	Eastern end of I-66 / US 17 concurrency; western end of US 17 Bus. concurrency; SR 55 east follows exit 27
Fauquier	Marshall	49.48	79.63	US 17 Bus. south (Winchester Road) / SR 710 (Rectortown Road) to I-66 – Warrenton	east end of US 17 Bus. concurrency
Fauquier	The Plains	53.99	86.89	SR 245 south (Fauquier Avenue) to I-66	Northern terminus of SR 245
Fauquier	The Plains			SR 626 (Loudoun Avenue) – Middleburg	former SR 17 north
Prince William	Haymarket	62.38	100.39	US 15 (James Madison Highway) – Leesburg, Warrenton	
Prince William	Gainesville	64.71	104.14	US 29 (Lee Highway) / SR 619 east (Linton Hall Road)	Eastern terminus
1.000 mi = 1.609 km; 1.000 km = 0.621 mi: Concurrency terminus

< SR 54	Two‑digit State Routes; 1923-1933	SR 56 >
