= List of places named after Robert Byrd =

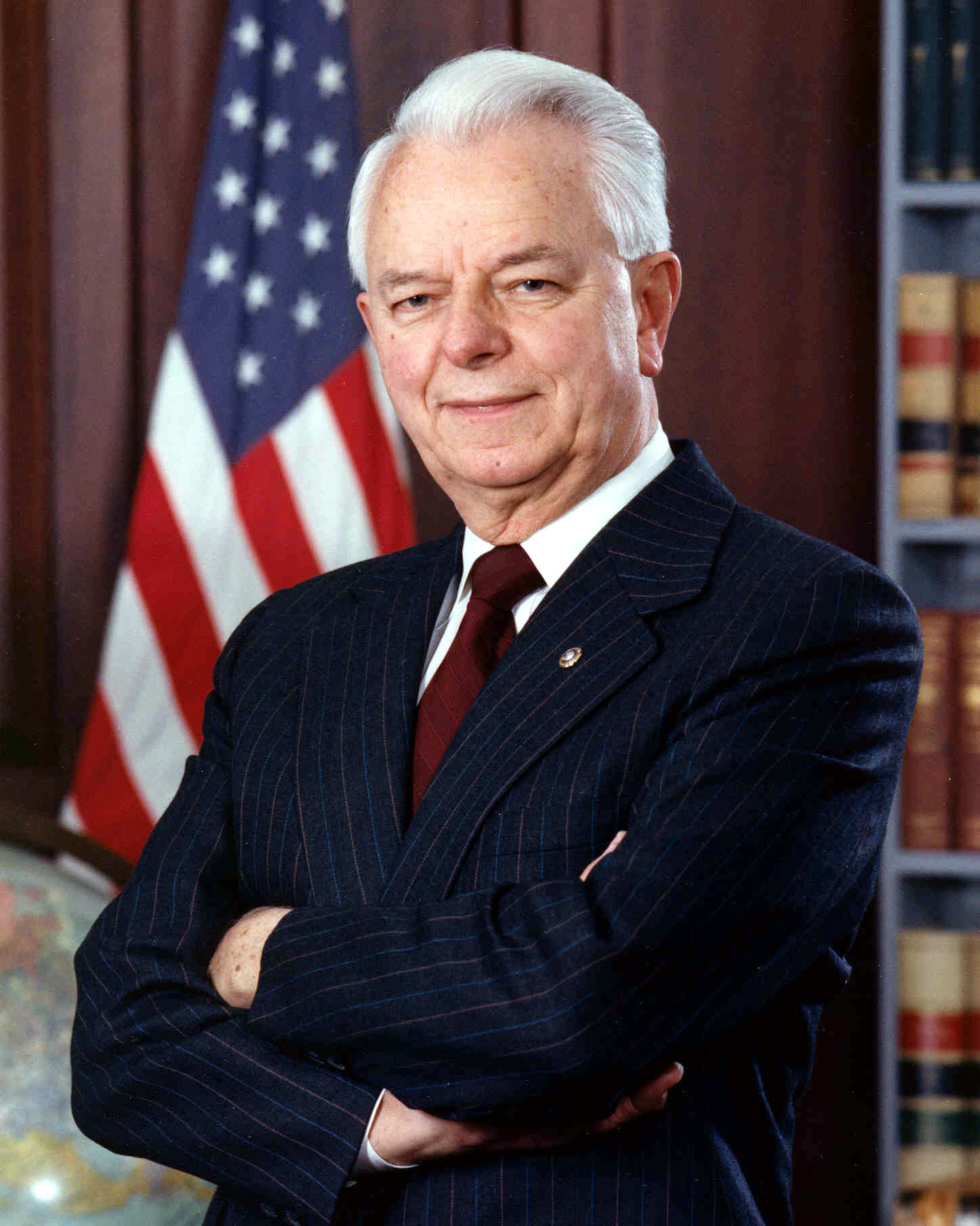
United States Senate portrait of Robert C. Byrd, circa 2003.

United States Senator Robert Byrd (November 20, 1917 – June 28, 2010) represented the U.S. state of West Virginia as a Democrat in the United States Senate from 1951 until his death in 2010. During his tenure as chairman of the United States Senate Committee on Appropriations, Byrd secured billions of dollars of Federal funds for projects throughout West Virginia, many of which bear his name. Byrd served four terms as Chairman of the Senate Appropriations Committee: January 3, 1989 through January 3, 1995; January 3, 2001 through January 20, 2001; June 6, 2001 through January 3, 2003; and January 3, 2007, through January 3, 2009. As a New Deal Democrat, Byrd used his position as chairman to battle persistent poverty in his home state of West Virginia, which he referred to as “one of the rock bottomest of states.” "I lost no opportunity to promote funding for programs and projects of benefit to the people back home," said Byrd.“ Within two years of his chairmanship, Byrd surpassed his announced five-year goal of making sure more than $1 billion in Federal funds was sent back to West Virginia. In referring to his economic contributions to West Virginia, Byrd said in 2000, "West Virginia has always had four friends: God Almighty, Sears Roebuck, Carter's Liver Pills and Robert C. Byrd."

Byrd's steering of billions of Federal dollars to West Virginia earned him the sobriquets "King of Pork" by the 501(c)(3) non-profit organization Citizens Against Government Waste and "Prince of Pork" from other taxpayer groups. According to Citizens Against Government Waste, Byrd was the first legislator to bring $1 billion of "pork" spending to his home state. The group named Byrd its initial "Porker of the Year" in 2002.

In addition to providing Federal funding to special projects, Byrd also ensured that many Federal complexes were built in West Virginia, including the Federal Bureau of Investigation's Criminal Justice Information Services Division complex in Clarksburg, the United States Coast Guard's National Maritime Center in Kearneysville, and a training center and firing range for U.S. Customs and Border Protection officers near Harpers Ferry. Clarksburg's FBI facility was the first of the major Federal complexes to be built under Byrd's leadership as chairman of the appropriations committee. In West Virginia's Eastern Panhandle, Byrd helped bring ten federal facilities that employed more than 3,200 people. None of these facilities are named for him, however.

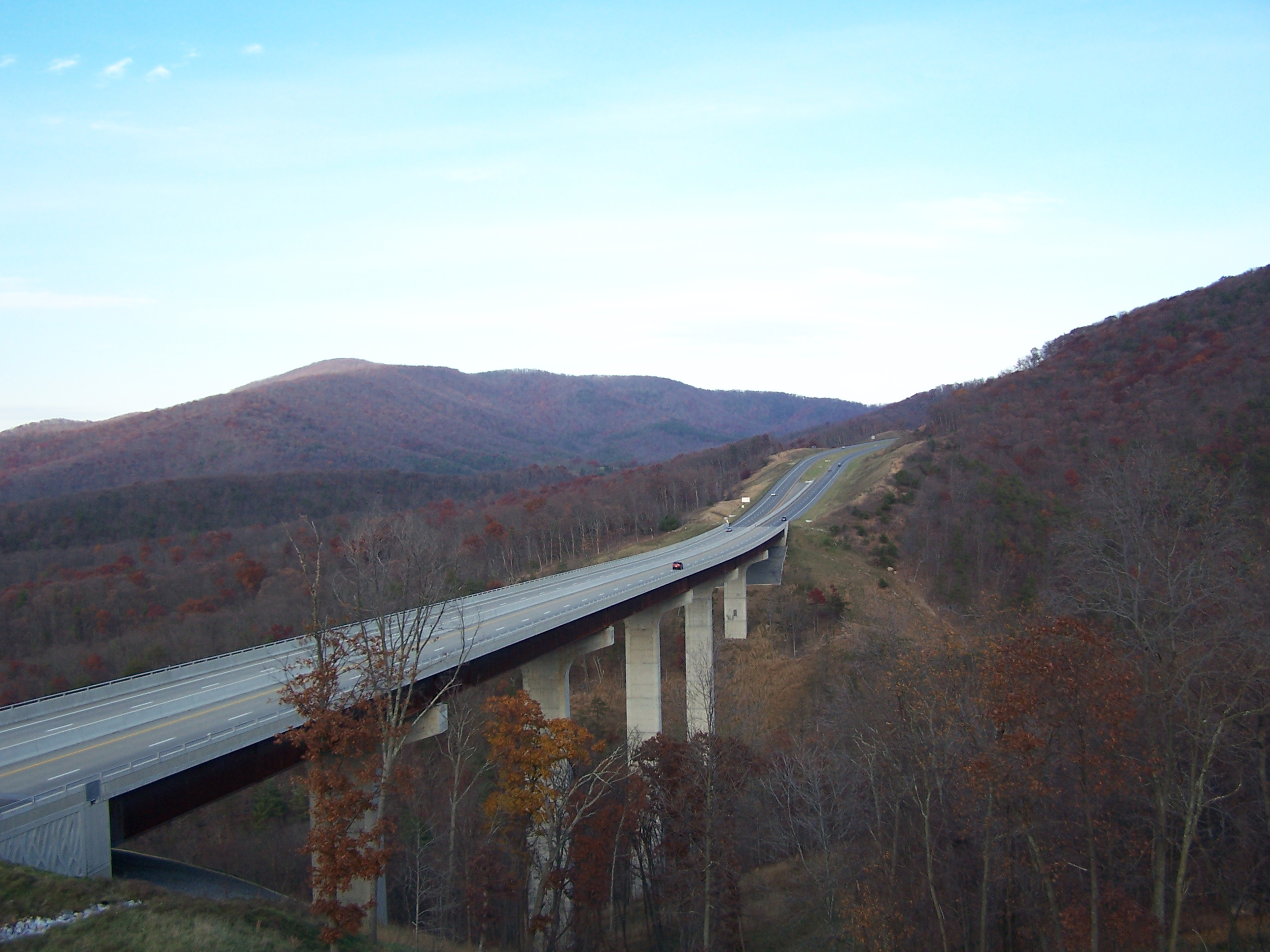
The Clifford Hollow Bridge carries the Robert C. Byrd Highway over Clifford Hollow near Moorefield, West Virginia.

More than 50 buildings built with funds from US taxpayers directed to West Virginia are named for either Byrd or his wife, Erma Ora Byrd (née James). Several transportation projects named for Byrd have gained national notoriety, including the Robert C. Byrd Highway. Also known as "Corridor H" of the Appalachian Development Highway System, the highway was dubbed "West Virginia's road to nowhere" in 2009 after it received a $9.5 million earmark in the $410 billion Omnibus Appropriations Act. The highway received another $21 million from the American Recovery and Reinvestment Act of 2009. Critics argued the traffic on the highway was too light and the cost too high for the project to continue construction until its proposed completion in 2035. The State of West Virginia argued the highway was necessary as "an ideal evacuation route for Washington, about 100 miles away, in case of an emergency."

== Academia, science, and technology ==
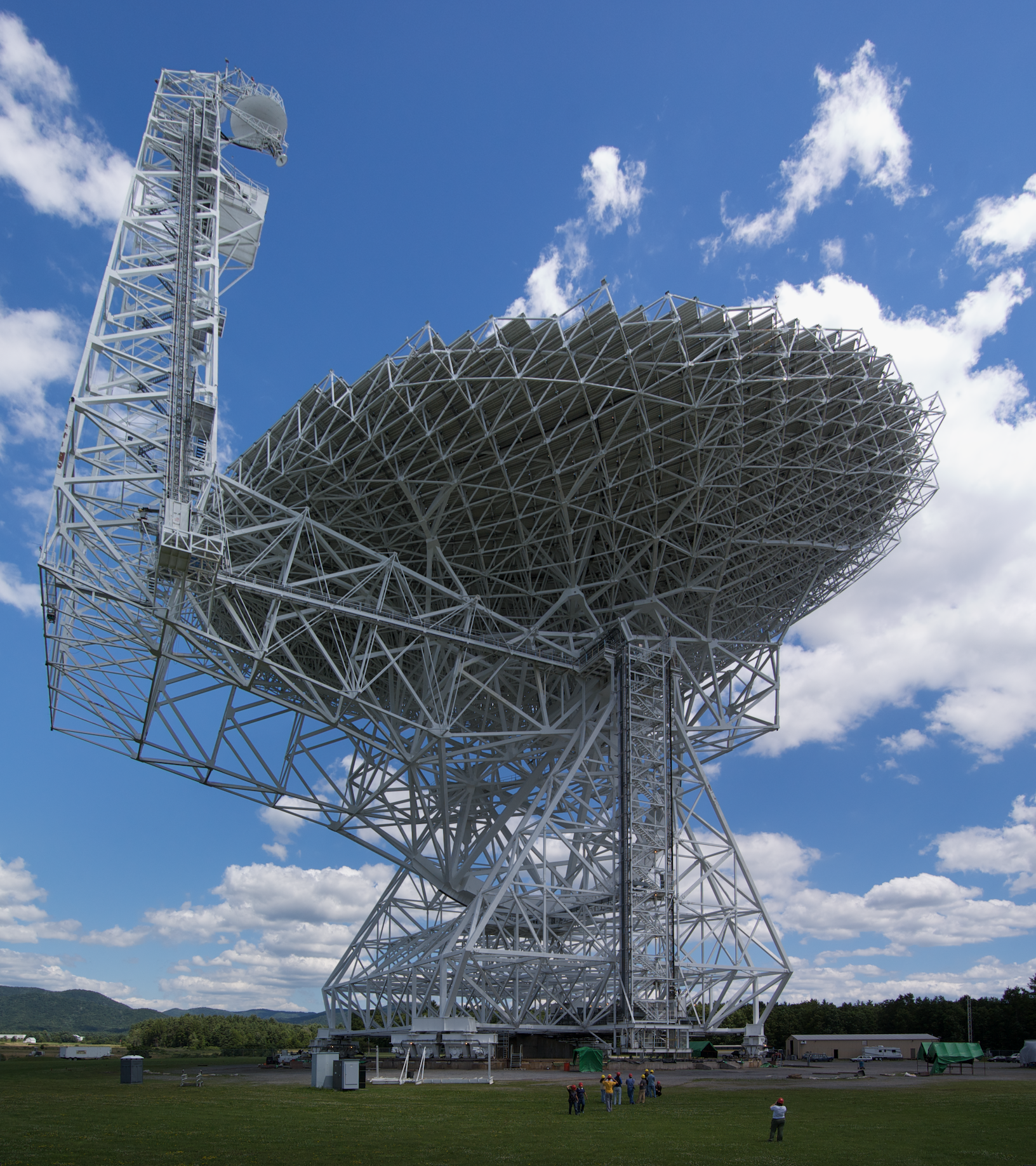
The Robert C. Byrd Green Bank Telescope in Green Bank, West Virginia.

- Robert C. Byrd Academic and Technology Center, Marshall University in Huntington, West Virginia
- Robert C. Byrd Academic and Technology Center, Marshall University Graduate College in South Charleston, West Virginia
- Robert C. Byrd Auditorium, National Conservation Training Center in Shepherdstown, West Virginia
- Robert C. Byrd Biotechnology Science Center, Marshall University in Huntington, West Virginia
- Robert C. Byrd Cancer Research Laboratory, West Virginia University in Morgantown, West Virginia
- Robert C. Byrd Center for Legislative Studies, Shepherd University in Shepherdstown, West Virginia
- Robert C. Byrd Center for Pharmacy Education, University of Charleston in Charleston, West Virginia
- Robert C. Byrd Center for Rural Health, Marshall University in Huntington, West Virginia
- Robert C. Byrd Clinical Teaching Center, Charleston Area Medical Center Memorial Hospital in Charleston, West Virginia
- Robert C. Byrd Green Bank Telescope, Green Bank, West Virginia
- Robert C. Byrd Hardwood Technologies Center, Princeton, West Virginia
- Robert C. Byrd Health Sciences Center, West Virginia University in Morgantown, West Virginia
- Robert C. Byrd Health Sciences Center Charleston Division, Charleston, West Virginia
- Robert C. Byrd High School, Clarksburg, West Virginia
- Robert C. Byrd Institute for Advanced Flexible Manufacturing (RCBI) Bridgeport Manufacturing Technology Center, Bridgeport, West Virginia
- RCBI Charleston Manufacturing Technology Center, South Charleston, West Virginia
- RCBI Huntington Manufacturing Technology Center, Huntington, West Virginia
- RCBI Rocket Center Manufacturing Technology Center, Rocket Center, West Virginia
- Robert C. Byrd Institute for Composites Technology and Training Center, Bridgeport, West Virginia
- Robert C. Byrd Library, Wheeling, West Virginia
- Robert C. Byrd Library and Robert C. Byrd Learning Resource Center, University of Charleston in Beckley
- Robert C. Byrd Life Long Learning Center, Eastern West Virginia Community and Technical College in Moorefield, West Virginia
- Robert C. Byrd Life Long Learning Center, West Virginia University in Morgantown, West Virginia
- Robert C. Byrd Metals Fabrication Center, Rocket Center, West Virginia
- Robert C. Byrd National Aerospace Education Center, Bridgeport, West Virginia (affiliated with Fairmont State University)
- Robert C. Byrd National Technology Transfer Center, Wheeling Jesuit University in Wheeling, West Virginia
- Robert C. Byrd Regional Training Institute, Camp Dawson near Kingwood, West Virginia
- Robert C. Byrd Science and Technology Center, Shepherd University in Shepherdstown, West Virginia
- Robert C. Byrd Technology Center, Alderson–Broaddus College in Philippi, West Virginia
- Robert C. Byrd United Technical Center

== Commerce ==
- Robert C. Byrd Hilltop Office Complex, Rocket Center, West Virginia
- Robert C. Byrd Industrial Park, Moorefield, West Virginia

== Community ==
- Robert C. Byrd Community Center, Pine Grove, West Virginia
- Robert C. Byrd Community Center, Sugar Grove, West Virginia

== Government ==
- Robert C. Byrd Rooms, Office of the West Virginia Senate Minority Leader, West Virginia State Capitol in Charleston, West Virginia
- Robert C. Byrd United States Courthouse and Federal Building, Beckley, West Virginia
- Robert C. Byrd United States Courthouse and Federal Building, Charleston, West Virginia
- Robert C. Byrd Federal Correctional Institution, Hazelton, West Virginia

== Healthcare ==
- Robert C. Byrd Clinic, West Virginia School of Osteopathic Medicine in Lewisburg, West Virginia
- Robert C. Byrd Clinical Addition to Veteran's Hospital, Huntington, West Virginia

== Recreation and tourism ==
- Robert C. Byrd Addition to the Lodge at Oglebay Park, Wheeling, West Virginia
- Robert C. Byrd Conference Center (also known as the Robert C. Byrd Center for Hospitality and Tourism), Davis & Elkins College in Elkins, West Virginia
- Robert C. Byrd Visitor Center, Harpers Ferry National Historical Park in Harpers Ferry, West Virginia

== Transportation ==
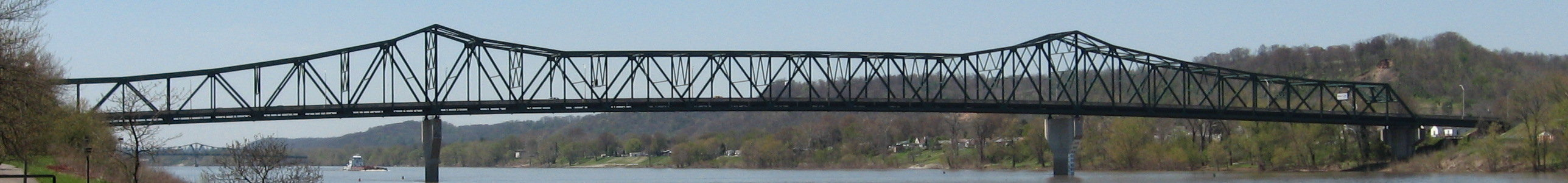
The Robert C. Byrd Bridge crossing the Ohio River between Huntington, West Virginia and Chesapeake, Ohio.

- Robert C. Byrd Appalachian Highway System, Appalachian Development Highway System in West Virginia
- Robert C. Byrd Bridge, crosses the Ohio River between Huntington, West Virginia and Chesapeake, Ohio
- Robert C. Byrd Bridge, Ohio County, West Virginia
- Robert C. Byrd Drive, West Virginia Routes 16 and 97 between Beckley and Sophia, West Virginia
- Robert C. Byrd Expressway, United States Route 22 near Weirton, West Virginia
- Robert C. Byrd Freeway, United States Route 119 between Williamson and Charleston, West Virginia (also known as Corridor G)
- Robert C. Byrd Highway, United States Route 48 between Weston, West Virginia and the Virginia state line near Wardensville, West Virginia (also known as Corridor H)
- Robert C. Byrd Interchange on Interstate 77
- Robert C. Byrd Interchange on United States Route 19, Birch River, West Virginia
- Robert C. Byrd Intermodal Transportation Center, Wheeling, West Virginia
- Robert C. Byrd Locks and Dam, Ohio River in Gallipolis Ferry, West Virginia

== Erma Ora Byrd ==
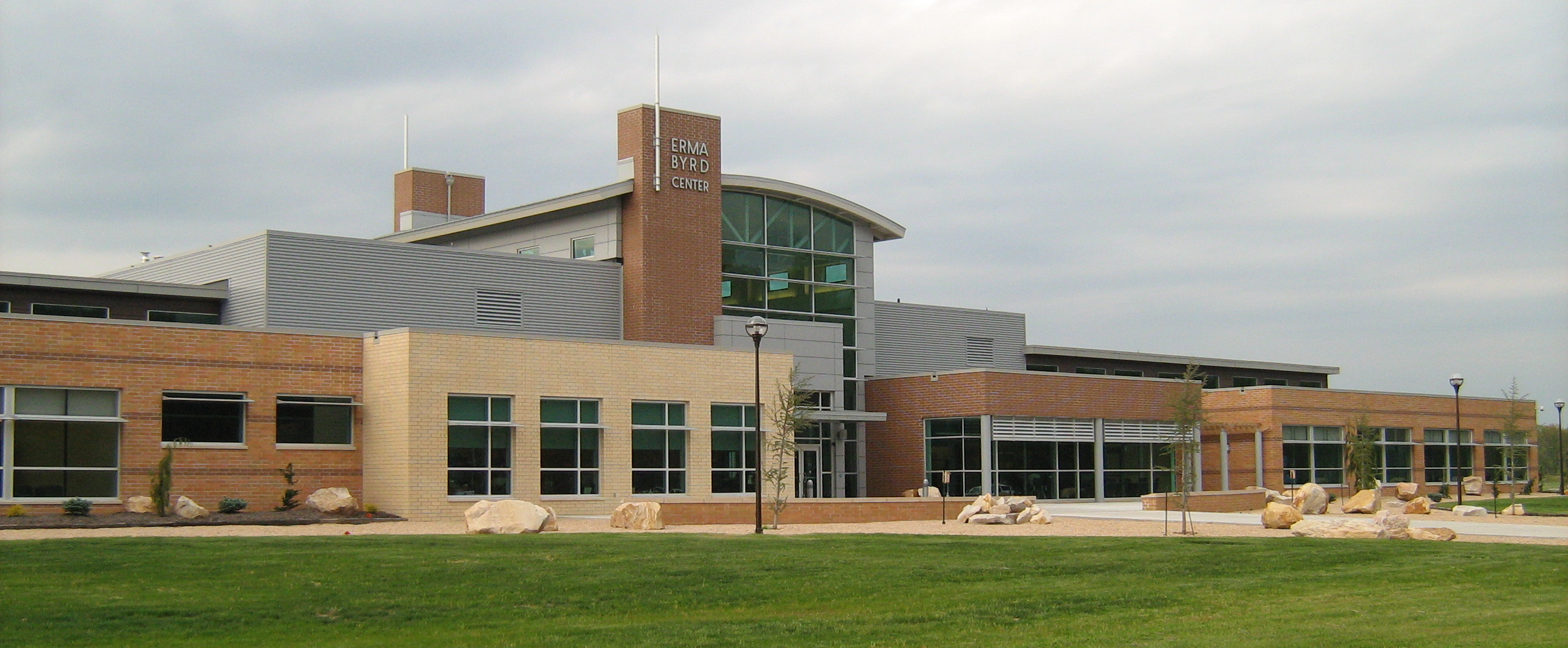
The Erma Byrd Higher Education Center at Concord University's Beckley Campus in Beaver, West Virginia.

The following places are named after Robert Byrd's wife, Erma Ora Byrd:

- Erma Byrd Biomedical Research Center, West Virginia University in Morgantown, West Virginia
- Erma Ora Byrd Center for Educational Technologies, Wheeling Jesuit University in Wheeling, West Virginia
- Erma Ora Byrd Clinical Center, Marshall University School of Medicine in Huntington, West Virginia
- Erma Ora Byrd Conference and Learning Center, Rocket Center, West Virginia
- Erma Byrd Eastern Panhandle Health Professions Center, Martinsburg, West Virginia
- Erma Byrd Gallery, University of Charleston in Charleston, West Virginia
- Erma Byrd Garden, Graceland Mansion in Elkins, West Virginia
- Erma Ora Byrd Hall, Department of Nursing Education, Shepherd University in Shepherdstown, West Virginia
- Erma Byrd Higher Education Center, Concord University Beckley Campus in Beaver, West Virginia
