= Virginia State Route 245 =

State highway in Fauquier County, Virginia, United States

State Route 245

Route information
- Maintained by VDOT
- Length: 3.27 mi (5.26 km)
- Existed: 1944–present
- Tourist routes: Virginia Byway

Major junctions
- South end: US 17 / SR 703 at Old Tavern
- I-66 near The Plains
- North end: SR 55 in The Plains

Location
- Country: United States
- State: Virginia
- Counties: Fauquier

Highway system
- Virginia Routes; Interstate; US; Primary; Secondary; Byways; History; HOT lanes
← SR 244	→ SR 246

State Route 245 (SR 245) is a primary state highway in the U.S. state of Virginia. Known for most of its length as Old Tavern Road, the state highway runs 3.27 miles (5.26 km) from U.S. Route 17 (US 17) at Old Tavern north to SR 55 in The Plains in northern Fauquier County.

SR 245 is a Virginia Byway.

== Route description ==
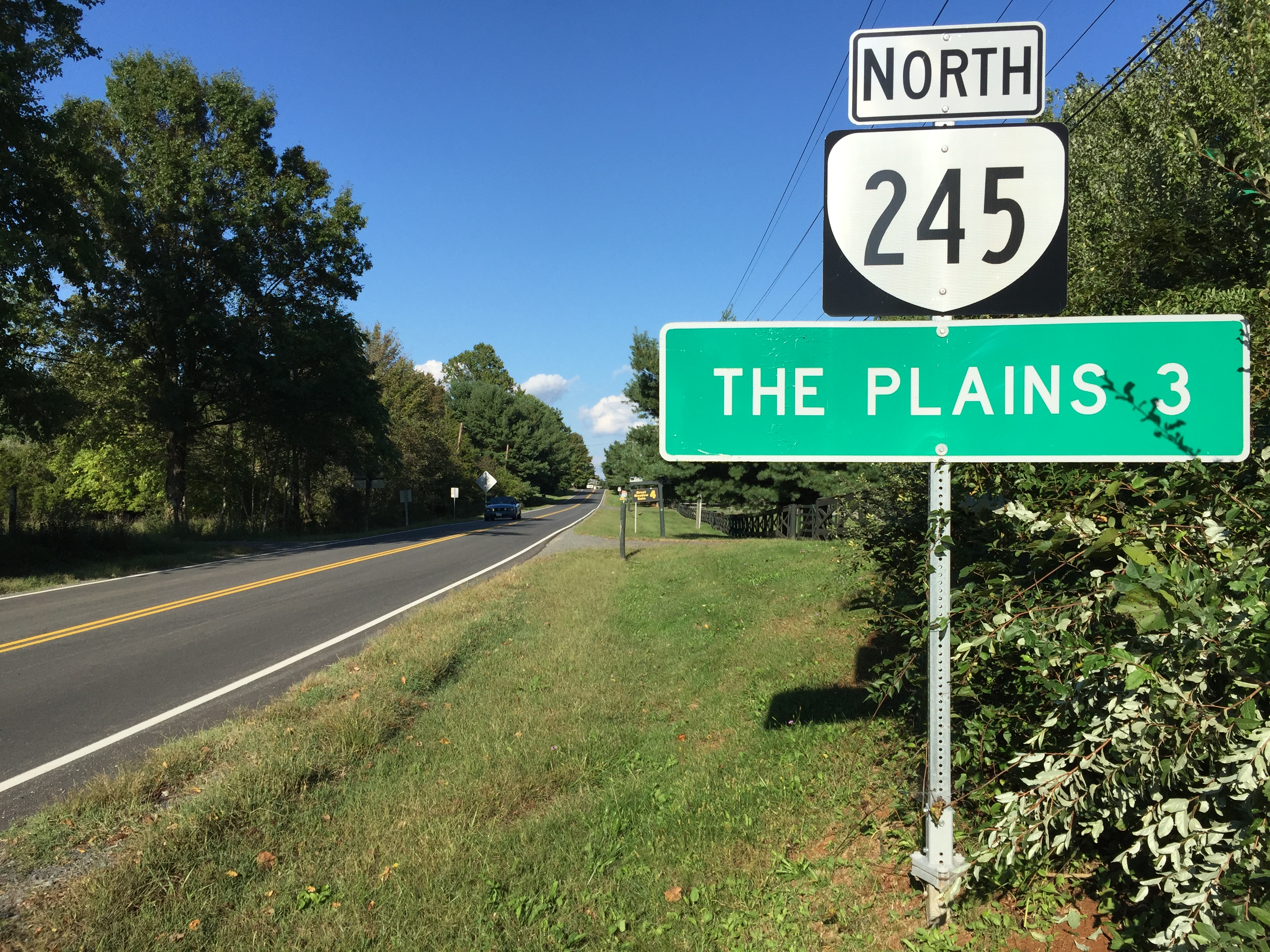
View north at the south end of SR 245 at US 17 and SR 703 in Old Tavern

SR 245 begins at an intersection with US 17 at the hamlet of Old Tavern; the U.S. Highway heads south toward Warrenton as James Madison Highway and northwest toward Winchester as Winchester Road. The state highway heads northeast as two-lane undivided Old Tavern Road through farmland, within which it crosses Piney Branch of Broad Run. SR 245 meets Interstate 66 at a diamond interchange south of the town of The Plains. The state highway enters town as Fauquier Avenue and reaches its northern terminus at SR 55 (Main Street).

== Major intersections ==
The entire route is in Fauquier County.

Location	mi	km	Destinations	Notes
Old Tavern	0.00	0.00	US 17 (James Madison Highway / Winchester Road) / SR 703 (Enon Church Road) to I-66 – Warrenton, Marshall, Winchester	Southern terminus
	2.05	3.30	I-66 – Strasburg, Washington	Exit 31 (I-66)
The Plains	3.27	5.26	SR 55 (Main Street) – Front Royal, Gainesville	Northern terminus
1.000 mi = 1.609 km; 1.000 km = 0.621 mi
