= Canfield, Randolph County, West Virginia =

Unincorporated community in West Virginia, United States

Canfield, West Virginia
- Unincorporated community
- Location within West Virginia Location within the United States
- Coordinates: 38°54′58″N 79°48′57″W
- Country: United States
- State: West Virginia
- County: Randolph
- Elevation: 2,100 ft (640 m)

Population
  - Total: 356
- Time zone: UTC-5 (Eastern (EST))
  - Summer (DST): UTC-4 (EDT)
- Area codes: 304 & 681
- GNIS feature ID: 1550629

Canfield is an unincorporated community in Randolph County, West Virginia, United States. Canfield is located along U.S. Route 33 and West Virginia Route 55, 1.8 miles (2.9 km) east-southeast of Elkins.
