= Muddlety, West Virginia =

- Unincorporated community
- Location within West Virginia Location within the United States
- Coordinates: 38°22′02″N 80°49′39″W
- Country: United States
- State: West Virginia
- County: Nicholas
- Elevation: 1,854 ft (565 m)
- Time zone: UTC-5 (Eastern (EST))
  - Summer (DST): UTC-4 (EDT)
- Area codes: 304 & 681
- GNIS feature ID: 1543923

Muddlety is an unincorporated community in Nicholas County, West Virginia, United States. Muddlety is located along U.S. Route 19 and West Virginia Route 55, 6 miles (9.7 km) north-northeast of Summersville.
