= West Virginia Route 55 =

State highway in West Virginia, United States

West Virginia Route 55

Route information
- Maintained by WVDOH
- Length: 227.9 mi (366.8 km)

Major junctions
- West end: US 19 in Muddlety
- WV 20 from Craigsville to Fenwick; WV 39 from Fenwick to Marlinton; US 219 from Mill Point to Elkins; US 250 from Huttonsville to Elkins; US 33 from Elkins to Seneca Rocks; WV 28 from Seneca Rocks to Moorefield; US 220 from Petersburg to Moorefield
- East end: US 48 / SR 55 near Wardensville

Location
- Country: United States
- State: West Virginia
- Counties: Nicholas, Greenbrier, Pocahontas, Randolph, Pendleton, Grant, Hardy

Highway system
- West Virginia State Highway System; Interstate; US; State
← WV 54	→ WV 57

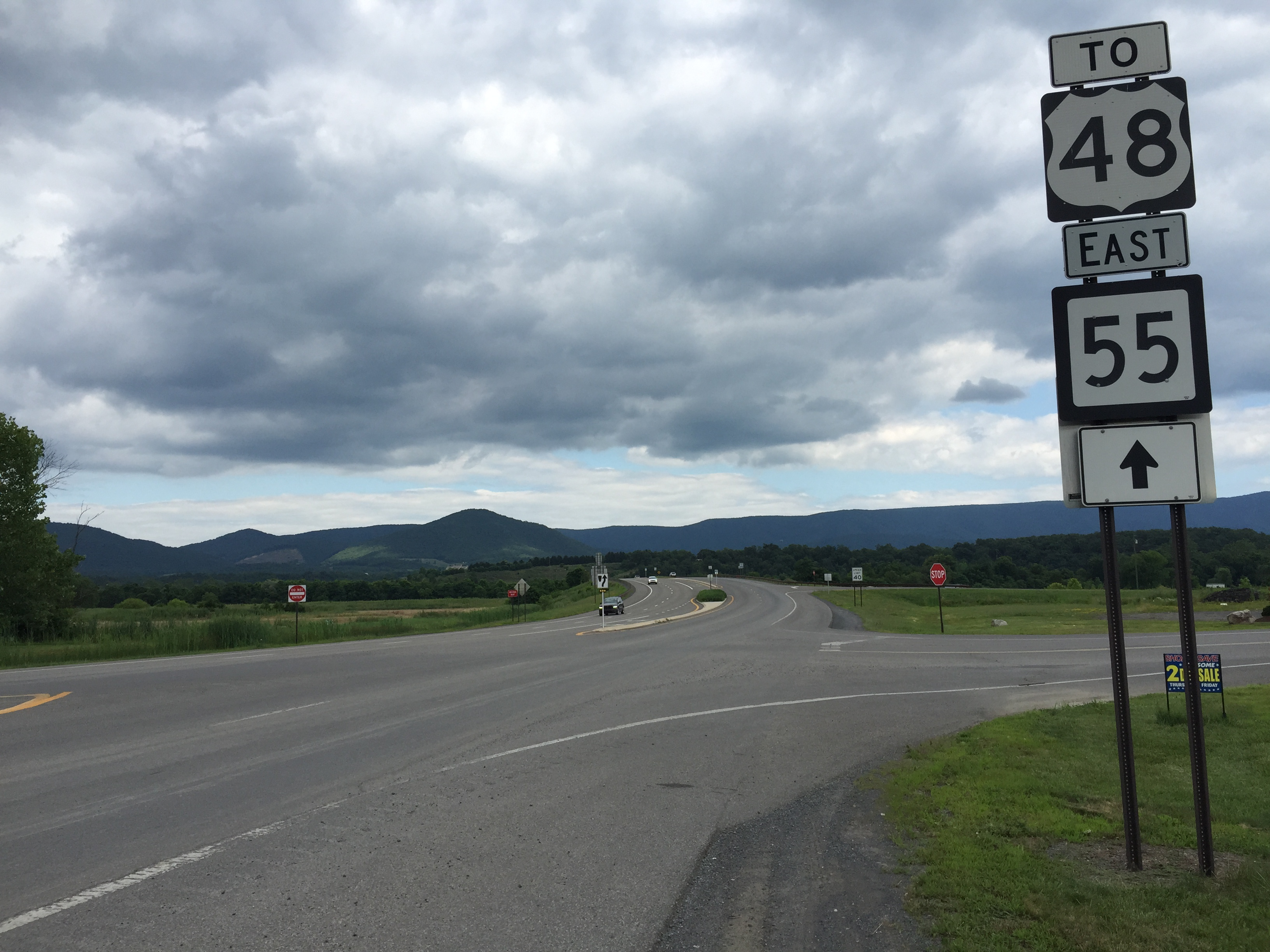
View east along WV 55 east of US 220/WV 28 in Moorefield

West Virginia Route 55 is an east–west state highway in West Virginia. The western terminus of the route is at U.S. Route 19 in Muddlety. The eastern terminus is at the Virginia state line six miles (10 km) east of Wardensville, where WV 55 continues as Virginia State Route 55. From Moorefield to the Virginia state line, WV 55 is concurrent with U.S. Route 48. This portion includes the Clifford Hollow Bridge.

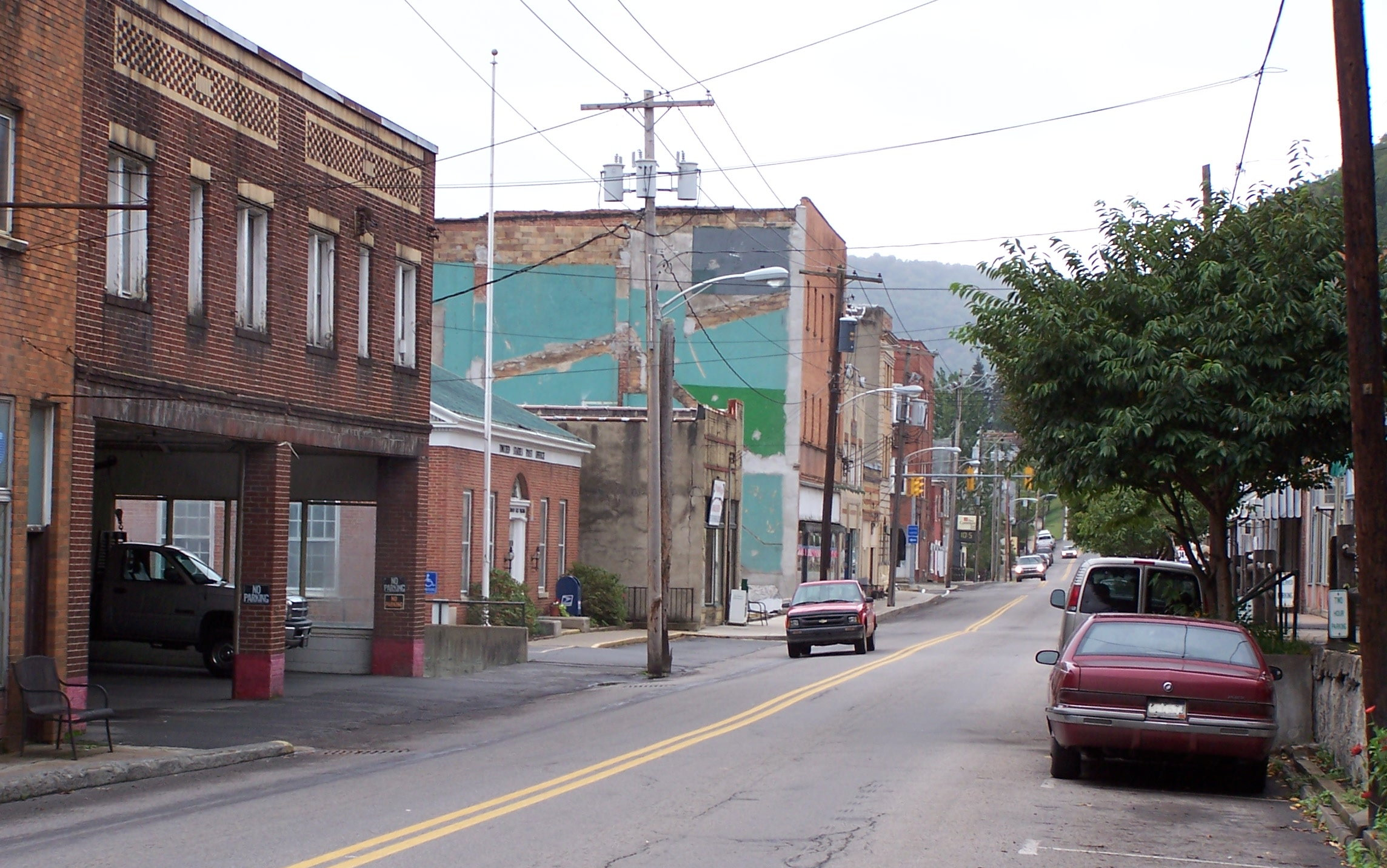
Main Street (WV 39 and WV 55) in Richwood.

== Major intersections ==
County	Location	mi	km	Destinations	Notes
Nicholas	Muddlety			US 19 – Summersville, Sutton	interchange
Nicholas				WV 41 south – Summersville	
Nicholas	Craigsville			WV 20 north – Camden on Gauley, Webster Springs	west end of WV 20 overlap
Nicholas	Fenwick			WV 20 south / WV 39 west – Summersville	east end of WV 20 overlap; west end of WV 39 overlap
see WV 39 and US 219
Randolph	Elkins			US 33 west / US 219 north / US 250 north / WV 92 north / CR 219/34 (11th Street / Elkins-Randolph County Industrial Park Road) – Parsons, Buckhannon, South Elkins	east end of US 219 / US 250 / WV 92 overlap; west end of US 33 overlap
see US 33
Pendleton	Seneca Rocks			US 33 east / WV 28 south – Franklin, Green Bank	east end of US 33 overlap; west end of WV 28 overlap
see WV 28
Hardy	Moorefield			US 220 north / WV 28 north – Romney, Keyser	east end of US 220 / WV 28 overlap
Hardy	Moorefield			US 48 west	interchange; west end of US 48 overlap
Hardy	see Corridor H				
Hardy				US 48 east / SR 55 east – Strasburg, Front Royal, Washington, DC	Virginia state line
1.000 mi = 1.609 km; 1.000 km = 0.621 mi: Concurrency terminus
