= Horner, West Virginia =

- Unincorporated community
- Location within West Virginia Location within the United States
- Coordinates: 39°00′02″N 80°22′57″W
- Country: United States
- State: West Virginia
- County: Lewis
- Elevation: 1,047 ft (319 m)
- Time zone: UTC-5 (Eastern (EST))
  - Summer (DST): UTC-4 (EDT)
- ZIP code: 26372
- Area codes: 304 & 681
- GNIS feature ID: 1554743

Horner is an unincorporated community in Lewis County, West Virginia, United States. Horner is located on U.S. Routes 33 and 119, 5 miles (8.0 km) southeast of Weston. Horner has a post office with ZIP code 26372.

The community was named after Seymore Horner, the original owner of the town site.
