= Clifford Hollow Bridge =

Bridge in Hardy County, West Virginia, US

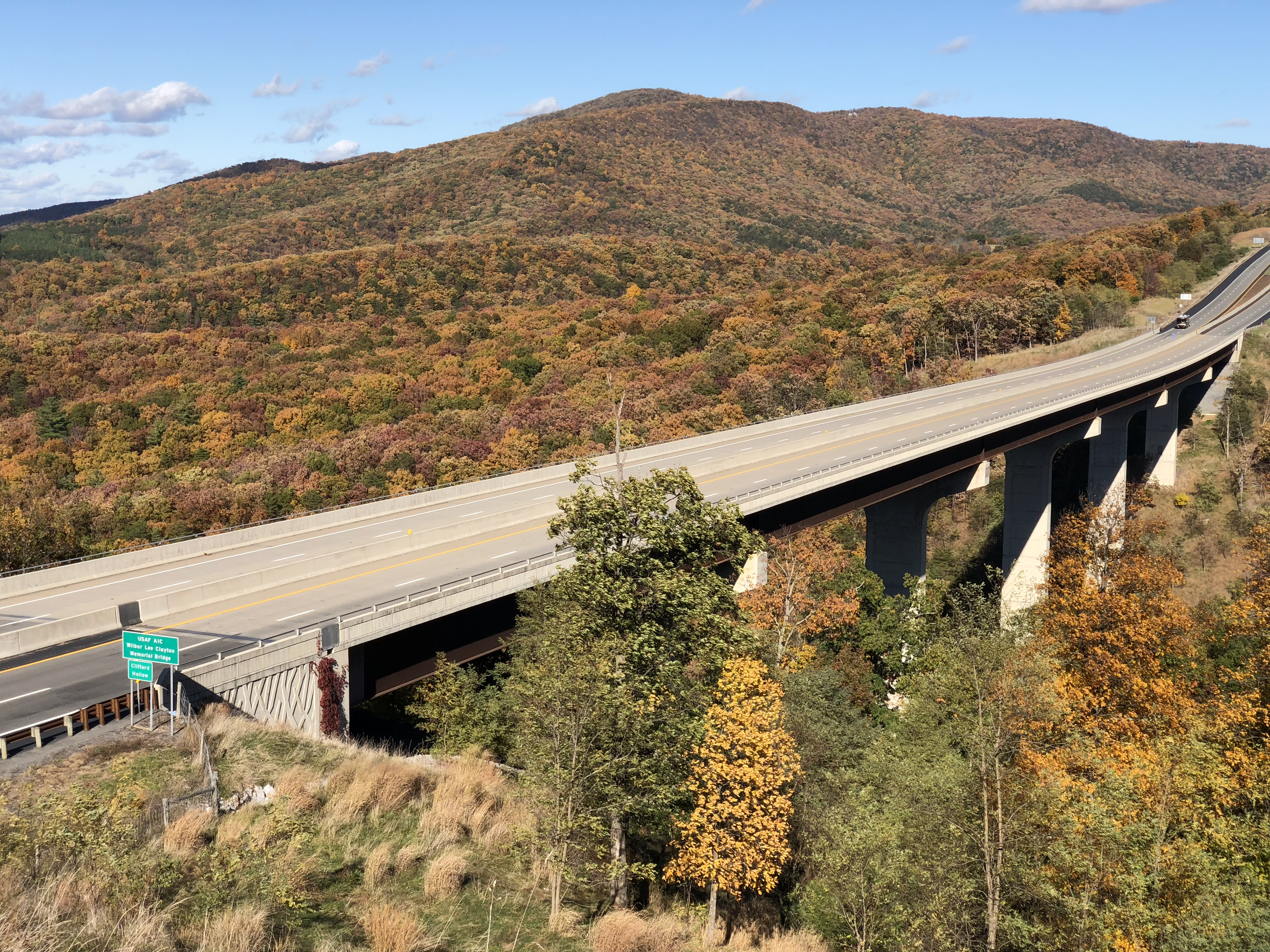
- Clifford Hollow Bridge in October 2019.
- Coordinates: 39°05′40″N 78°52′46″W
- Carries: US 48 / WV 55
- Crosses: Clifford Hollow
- Locale: Hardy County, West Virginia
- Maintained by: West Virginia Division of Highways

Characteristics
- Design: Steel girder
- Total length: 1,522 feet (464 m)

History
- Opened: 2003

Clifford Hollow Bridge is a four-lane, 1,522-foot-long (464 m) bridge in Hardy County, West Virginia. It carries Corridor H (U.S. Route 48 and West Virginia Route 55) across Clifford Hollow approximately 5 miles (8.0 km) east of Moorefield.

The bridge was completed in 2003. It rises nearly 300 feet (91 m) above the valley below and is supported by a girder-substring system with end spans of 210 feet (64 m) and four interior spans at 275.5 feet (84.0 m).

Clifford Hollow Bridge was awarded winning long-span steel bridge in the 2005 National Steel Bridge Alliance (NSBA) Prize Bridge Award Competition.
