= Haddix Run =

Stream in West Virginia, U.S.

Coordinates: 39°04′24″N 79°41′26″W

Haddix Run is a stream in the U.S. state of West Virginia.

The stream most likely was named after the local Haddix family.

== See also ==
- List of rivers of West Virginia
