= Lorentz, West Virginia =

- Unincorporated community
- Location within West Virginia Location within the United States
- Coordinates: 39°00′39″N 80°18′08″W
- Country: United States
- State: West Virginia
- County: Upshur
- Elevation: 1,447 ft (441 m)
- Time zone: UTC-5 (Eastern (EST))
  - Summer (DST): UTC-4 (EDT)
- ZIP code: 26229
- Area codes: 304 & 681
- GNIS feature ID: 1542457

Lorentz is an unincorporated community in Upshur County, West Virginia, United States. Lorentz is located on U.S. routes 33 and 119, 4 miles (6.4 km) west-northwest of Buckhannon. Lorentz has a post office with ZIP code 26229.

The community was named after Jacob Lorentz, a businessperson in the banking industry.

== Climate ==
The climate in this area is characterized by relatively high temperatures and evenly distributed precipitation throughout the year. According to the Köppen Climate Classification system, Lorentz has a Humid subtropical climate, abbreviated "Cfa" on climate maps.

Climate data for Lorentz, West Virginia
Month	Jan	Feb	Mar	Apr	May	Jun	Jul	Aug	Sep	Oct	Nov	Dec	Year
Mean daily maximum °C (°F)	6 (42)	7 (44)	12 (53)	18 (64)	23 (74)	27 (80)	28 (83)	28 (82)	25 (77)	19 (66)	12 (54)	7 (44)	18 (64)
Mean daily minimum °C (°F)	−6 (22)	−6 (22)	−1 (30)	3 (38)	9 (48)	13 (56)	16 (60)	14 (58)	11 (52)	4 (40)	−1 (31)	−4 (24)	4 (40)
Average precipitation cm (inches)	10 (4)	8.9 (3.5)	11 (4.3)	10 (4)	12 (4.7)	13 (5.1)	13 (5.3)	11 (4.4)	9.1 (3.6)	8.6 (3.4)	8.6 (3.4)	9.9 (3.9)	126 (49.5)
Source: Weatherbase
