= South Elkins, West Virginia =

Neighborhood in Elkins, West Virginia

Coordinates: 38°55′N 79°51′W

South Elkins is a neighborhood in the city of Elkins, West Virginia, located across the Tygart Valley River from downtown. The town of South Elkins was incorporated in 1899 and consolidated with the city of Elkins in 1901.
