= Old Tavern, Virginia =

Unincorporated community in Virginia, US

Coordinates: 38°49′53″N 77°48′43″W

Old Tavern is an unincorporated community in Fauquier County, in the U.S. state of Virginia.
