= Kerens, West Virginia =

- Unincorporated community
- Location within West Virginia Location within the United States
- Coordinates: 39°00′45″N 79°48′49″W
- Country: United States
- State: West Virginia
- County: Randolph
- Elevation: 1,949 ft (594 m)
- Time zone: UTC-5 (Eastern (EST))
  - Summer (DST): UTC-4 (EDT)
- ZIP code: 26276
- Area codes: 304 & 681
- GNIS feature ID: 1554864

Kerens is an unincorporated community in Randolph County, West Virginia, United States. Kerens is 6.5 miles (10.5 km) north-northeast of Elkins, along Leading Creek. Kerens has a post office with ZIP code 26276.

The community was named in honor of Richard C. Kerens, a railroad official.
