= Lebanon Church, Virginia =

- CDP
- Interactive map of Lebanon Church, Virginia
- Coordinates: 39°03′18″N 78°22′05″W
- Country: United States
- State: Virginia
- County: Shenandoah
- Time zone: UTC−5 (Eastern (EST))
  - Summer (DST): UTC−4 (EDT)
- FIPS code: 51-04928

Lebanon Church is a census-designated place in Shenandoah County, in the U.S. state of Virginia. The John Marshall Highway passes through it and by the Lebanon Church Cemetery.
