= Wheatfield, Virginia =

Unincorporated community in Virginia, US

Coordinates: 39°04′24″N 78°22′20″W

Wheatfield is an unincorporated community in Shenandoah County, in the U.S. state of Virginia.
