= White Oak, West Virginia =

White Oak, West Virginia may refer to:

- White Oak, Raleigh County, West Virginia, an unincorporated community in Raleigh County
- White Oak, Ritchie County, West Virginia, an unincorporated community in Ritchie County
- White Oak, Upshur County, West Virginia, an unincorporated community in Upshur County
