= Tennerton, West Virginia =

Tennerton
- Unincorporated community
- Location within the state of West Virginia Tennerton (the United States)
- Coordinates: 38°57′48″N 80°13′26″W
- Country: United States
- State: West Virginia
- County: Upshur
- Time zone: UTC-5 (Eastern (EST))
  - Summer (DST): UTC-4 (EDT)
- ZIP code: 26201

Tennerton is an unincorporated community along the Buckhannon River, directly south of Buckhannon in Upshur County, West Virginia, United States.

Tennerton's public schools are operated by Upshur County Schools.
