= Lerona =

Lerona may refer to:

- Lerona, California, United States
- Lerona, West Virginia, United States
