= Alton, West Virginia =

Unincorporated community in West Virginia, United States

Alton
- Unincorporated community
- Location within the state of West Virginia Alton (the United States)
- Coordinates: 38°49′9″N 80°12′50″W
- Country: United States
- State: West Virginia
- County: Upshur
- Time zone: UTC-5 (Eastern (EST))
  - Summer (DST): UTC-4 (EDT)

Alton is an unincorporated community on the Buckhannon River in Upshur County, West Virginia, United States.

Alton is located at the junction of County Routes 32 and 11/9. The community was originally known as Pringles Mill after the local Pringle family, descendants of John and Samuel Pringle. The Pringle brothers became popular in West Virginia folklore when they took up residence in a sycamore tree later named the Pringle Tree and lived there until the fall of 1767, when John went back to the South Branch Potomac River valley and learned that the French and Indian War was over and that they were no longer wanted as deserters.

There is a church in the hamlet, Alton UMC. There was an office or siding on the Appalachian and Ohio Railroad, but as of 2026, it only carries freight between Grafton, West Virginia and Cowen, West Virginia, primarily coal, lumber, and chemicals.
