= Selbyville, West Virginia =

Selbyville
- Unincorporated community
- Location within the state of West Virginia Selbyville (the United States)
- Coordinates: 38°45′14″N 80°14′11″W
- Country: United States
- State: West Virginia
- County: Upshur
- Time zone: UTC-5 (Eastern (EST))
  - Summer (DST): UTC-4 (EDT)
- ZIP code: 26236
- Area codes: 304 and 681

Selbyville is an unincorporated community along the Right Fork Buckhannon River in Upshur County, West Virginia, United States.

The community was named after Lord Selby.

Selbyville's public schools are operated by Upshur County Schools.
