= Edie McKee Harper =

American photographer

- Born: March 29, 1922; Kansas City, USA
- Died: January 10, 2010 (aged 87)
- Spouse: Charley Harper (m. 1947)

Edie McKee Harper (March 29, 1922 – January 10, 2010) was an American photographer, artist and wildlife conservationist. Harper made her living as an artist for 60 years, working in many mediums, including sculptures, paintings, textiles, jewelry and lithographs, etc.

== Early life ==
Edith Riley K. "Edie" Mckee Harper was born March 29, 1922, in Kansas City, Kansas. Harper was an only child and her family moved frequently in her early years. Eventually, the family settled in Cincinnati, Ohio, after her father got hired for a position with Procter & Gamble. Harper graduated from Wyoming High School in 1939.

== World War II and school ==
Harper attended the Art Academy of Cincinnati for formal art training, where she took printmaking with Maybelle and Wilson Stamper and color theory with Josef Albers. She met her future husband, the artist Charley Harper in 1940 on their first day at the Art Academy of Cincinnati. When WWII came, Harper contributed to the war effort as an Army Corps of Engineers photographer, while Charley Harper was drafted into the Army. She took photographs of different structures on the home front, such as hydro dams and cement test samples. Edie processed the film in the lab for the Corps of Engineers. Photographs from her war work became highly acclaimed and were shown in an exhibition at the Cincinnati Contemporary Art Center in 1961. After the war ended, both Edie and Charley were able to continue their studies and graduate from the Art Academy of Cincinnati in 1947. They married shortly after graduation and eventually had one son, also an artist, Brett Harper. The newly-minted Harpers drove across America on a six-month honeymoon, camping and creating artworks of the places that they visited, like the Grand Canyon. This period inspired a life-long focus on wildlife for both artists for the remainder of their careers.

== Career ==
Following the war, Harper continued to work in photography, but experimented in many alternate mediums, like pottery, textiles, jewelry, sculpture, painting and lithography. Her work is often overshadowed by her famous husband, possibly because of the similar themes and graphic style. She has been called "the most under-appreciated photographer in Cincinnati," by curator David Lusenhop Jr.

== List of works ==
Harper's artwork spans many media, from her black and white photographs from World War II to her acrylic paintings of cats and New and Old Testament readings. Some of Edie's more well-known works include:

- Little Red Riding Hood- 1940s
- Maestro, c. 1945 by Edie Harper, oil on board, 21.25 × 12"{
- 1947 self-portrait
- Woodland Fauna, mural, 1947–1948
- Untitled (123), c. 1950 by Edie Harper. oil on canvas, 18 × 24¼"
- Noazark (1975)
- Third Kind
- Matador
- Little David
- Nine Tails

== Art shows ==
- Solo photograph exhibition, 1961, the Contemporary Arts Center, Cincinnati.
- "Cincinnati modern art & design at mid-century", 2002, at the Aronoff Center for the Arts
- "Graphic Content", 2006, at Cincinnati's Contemporary Arts Center
- "Minimal Realism: Charley and Edie Harper," August 2007 at the Cincinnati Art Museum
- "Harper Ever After," 2013, at the Cincinnati Art Museum
- "Modern Cat", June 2016, at the Cincinnati Art Museum
- "E is for Edie" at The Carnegie, first solo retrospective
- Edie McKee Harper: Modernist at Play, October 16, 2026-January 24, 2027 at the Taft Museum of Art, first solo museum retrospective

== Publications ==
- Edie Harper Coloring Book
- Edie was the illustrator for the children's book, My Nose Is Running, by Louise Bonnett-Rampersaud.
