= Maurice Brooks (naturalist) =

American educator and naturalist

Maurice Graham Brooks (June 16, 1900 – January 10, 1993) was an American educator and naturalist whose name became synonymous with the natural history of Appalachia.

== Biography ==
Brooks was born on the family farm at French Creek, Upshur County, West Virginia, where he maintained a residence for much of the remainder of his life. His father — photographer and local historian Fred E. Brooks — and three of his uncles were also professional naturalists or biologists. One uncle was Albert Nelson Brooks (1897–1966), surveyor and naturalist (and namesake of the Brooks Bird Club).

Maurice Brooks attended Davis and Elkins College and West Virginia Wesleyan College before eventually graduating from West Virginia University (WVU) in 1923. He was also educated at the University of Michigan. He later taught at the University of Virginia and the University of Minnesota.

In 1934, he joined the faculty of WVU as a professor in the Biology Department. In 1938, he moved to the Division of Forestry, where he taught courses in wildlife management until his retirement in 1969.

While perhaps best known for his contributions to ornithology, Brooks also made contributions to Appalachian botany, herpetology, mammalogy, and chemical ecology.

== Awards and accolades ==
- Member, West Virginia Conservation Commission, for eight years.
- Fellow of the American Association for the Advancement of Science.
- Fellow of the American Ornithologists' Union.
- President, Wilson Ornithological Society.
- Order of Vandalia (1970), by West Virginia University.
- West Virginia Man of the Year (1970), by West Virginia State Legislature.
- West Virginian of the Year (1970), by Charleston Gazette Mail.

== Books, monographs and popular articles ==
- The Pteridophytes of West Virginia, (1938); Series: West Virginia University Studies [4]
- Check-list of West Virginia Birds, (1944); Bulletin: Agricultural Experiment Station, College of Agriculture, Forestry, and Home Economics, West Virginia University
- "Notes on the Cheat Mountain salamander", (1948); Copeia 1948:239–244.
- Effect of Black Walnut Trees and their Products on Other Vegetation (1951); Bulletin: Agricultural Experiment Station, College of Agriculture, Forestry and Home Economics, West Virginia University
- "Forests and Forest Research" (1963), West Virginia Geologic and Economic Survey; 33, 171 – 190.
- The Appalachians (1965); Series: The Naturalist's America, Illustrated by Lois Darling and Lo Brooks, Boston: Houghton Mifflin Company
- The Life of the Mountains (1968); Series: Our Living World of Nature, McGraw-Hill
- "Remarkable Dolly Sods" (1969–70), Outdoor West Virginia [Title changed to Wonderful West Virginia, 1970]; Nov 1969, pp 10–13; Jan 1970, pp 10–13; Feb 1970, pp 10–13.

== See also ==
- Cranberry Glades
