= Appalachian and Ohio Railroad =

Railroad in West Virginia, United States

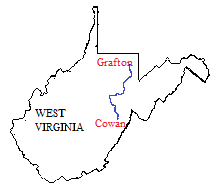
Map of the Appalachian and Ohio Rail line

The Appalachian and Ohio Railroad (reporting mark AO) is a class III railroad operating in West Virginia.

Originally the Cowen and Pickens Subdivisions of the Baltimore & Ohio Railroad, the railroad was a part of CSX until it was leased to Watco, which began operating the railroad on March 25, 2005. Watco only held the line for a short time before turning the lease from CSX over to Four Rivers Transportation, now P&L Transportation, on May 15, 2006.

The railroad operates 158 miles of track between Grafton and Cowen. It has one active branch, a portion of the Pickens Subdivision that connects Alexander to the main line at Hampton.

The A&O's main customers are coal mines, although it carries smaller amounts of chemicals and wood. Among the six coal mines it serves is the Sago Mine, site of the Sago Mine disaster in 2006.

It connects with three other railroads:

- CSX, at Grafton
- Beech Mountain Railroad (BEEM), at Alexander
- West Virginia Central Railroad (WVC), at Tygart

Two of these railroads are currently active, the WVC regularly bringing freight trains to the interchange at Tygart and CSX. With the closure of the coal mine serviced by BEEM, A&O no longer serves the line for revenue service.

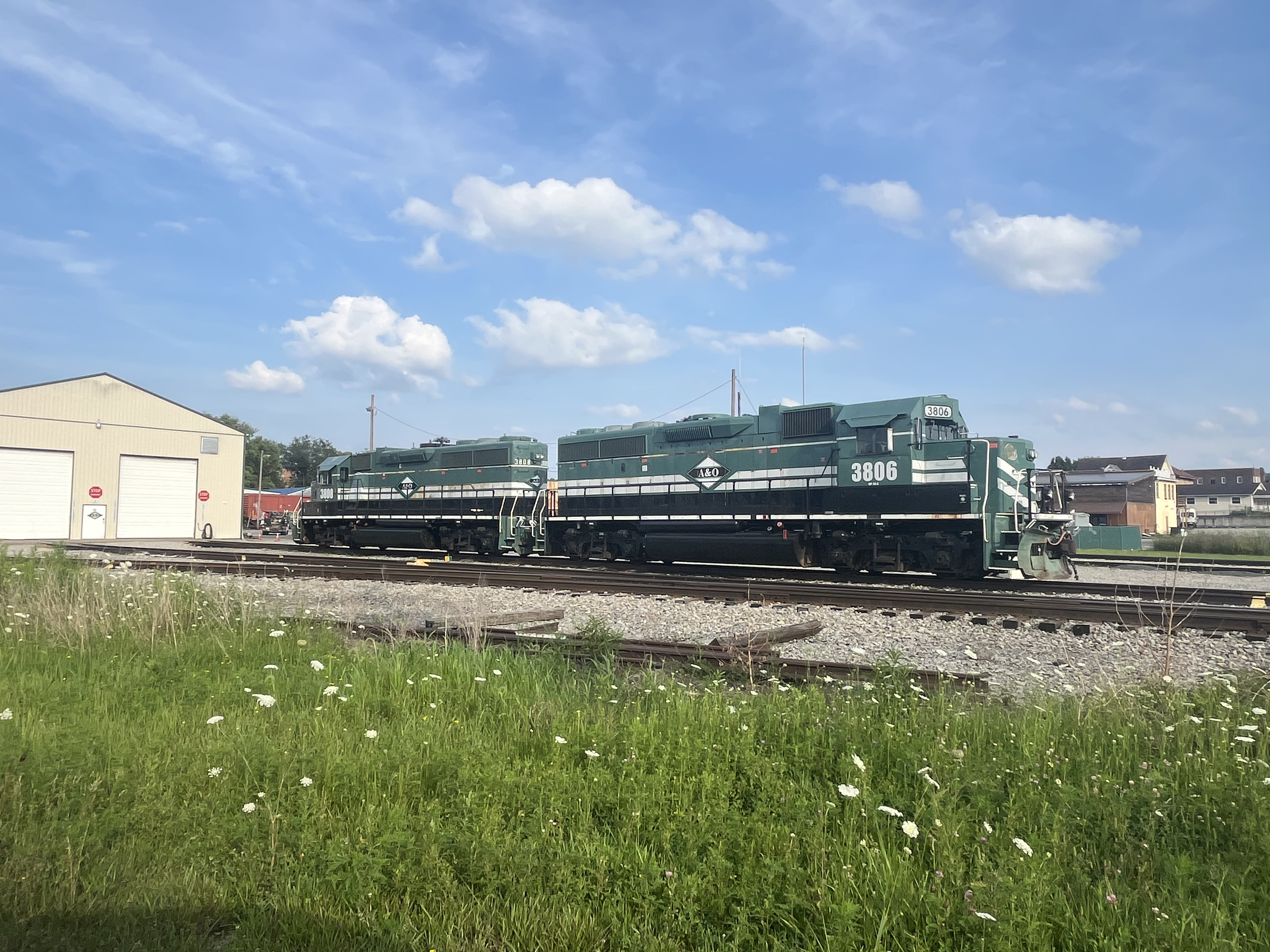

Locomotive Roster

The A&O railroad uses CSX locomotives to move the empty and loaded cars coal trains to and from customers. They had lease four CEFX EMD SD90MACs (#s 125, 130, 133-134) for helper services in the Burnsville area, but have since been returned to CEFX. Two GP40-3s (#s2105, 2113), two road slugs (#s 2102, 2114) six GMTX EMD GP38-2s (#s 2631, 2634, 2638, 2662, 2665 and 2670), for various switching and local tasks. All fourteen EMD SD50s (#5101-5102, 5104, 5106-5110, 5114-5119) went to other Watco operations.
