= Nebo, West Virginia =

Nebo, West Virginia may refer to the following communities in West Virginia:

- Nebo, Clay County, West Virginia, an unincorporated community in Clay County
- Nebo, Upshur County, West Virginia, an unincorporated community in Upshur County
