= Ruraldale =

Ruraldale may refer to:

- Ruraldale, Ohio, an unincorporated community in Muskingum County
- Ruraldale, West Virginia, an unincorporated community in Upshur County
