= Deanville =

Deanville may refer to:

- Deanville, Texas, an unincorporated community in Burleson County
- Deanville, Pennsylvania, an unincorporated community in Armstrong County
- Deanville, West Virginia, an unincorporated community in Upshur County
