= Eden, West Virginia =

Eden, West Virginia may refer to:

- Eden, Ohio County, West Virginia, an unincorporated community
- Eden, Upshur County, West Virginia, an unincorporated community
