= Sand Run =

Sand Run may refer to:

- Sand Run (Cuyahoga River tributary), a stream in Summit County, Ohio, United States
- Sand Run, Ohio, an unincorporated community in Hocking County
- Sand Run, West Virginia, an unincorporated community in Upshur County
