= Greenville, West Virginia =

Greenville, West Virginia may refer to:

- Greenville, Logan County, West Virginia, an unincorporated community in Logan County
- Greenville, Monroe County, West Virginia, an unincorporated community in Monroe County
- An alternate name for Greencastle, West Virginia, an unincorporated community in Wirt County
