= Midvale =

Midvale may refer to:

== Places ==
- Midvale, Western Australia
- Midvale Ridge, an area of south central England

=== United States ===
- Midvale, Idaho
- Midvale, Montana
- Midvale, Ohio
- Midvale, Utah, the largest city with the name in the United States
- Midvale, Washington
- Midvale, West Virginia

== Other uses ==
- Midvale (DC Comics), the home of Supergirl
- "Midvale" (Supergirl), an episode of the television series Supergirl
- Midvale Steel

== See also ==
- Midville (disambiguation)
- Middle Valley (disambiguation)
