= Reger (disambiguation) =

Reger is a surname of German origin.

Reger may also refer to:

- 4347 Reger, an asteroid
- Reger, Missouri
- Reger, West Virginia
- Reger-Chor, a German choir
