= Adrian, West Virginia =

Unincorporated community in West Virginia, United States

- Unincorporated community
- Location within West Virginia Location within the United States
- Coordinates: 38°54′19″N 80°16′32″W
- Country: United States
- State: West Virginia
- County: Upshur
- Elevation: 1,447 ft (441 m)
- Time zone: UTC-5 (Eastern (EST))
  - Summer (DST): UTC-4 (EDT)
- ZIP code: 26210
- Area codes: 304 & 681
- GNIS feature ID: 1553699

Adrian is an unincorporated community in Upshur County, West Virginia, United States. Adrian is located on West Virginia Route 20, 6.5 miles (10.5 km) southwest of Buckhannon. Adrian has a post office with ZIP code 26210. As of the 2020 census, Adrian had a population of 183.

Some say the origin of the name Adrian is obscure, while others believe the community has the name of an early settler.

Adrian is located along Bull Run at its confluences with New Found Run and French Creek, and it is also located along County Route 20. The Elk River Railroad (formerly the Coal and Coke Railway) also passes through the community.
