= Shooks Run =

Stream in West Virginia, U.S.

Coordinates: 39°09′08″N 80°02′37″W

Shooks Run is a stream in the U.S. state of West Virginia. It is a tributary to the Tygart Valley River.

Shooks Run was named after Monus Shook, a pioneer citizen.
