= Freeman, West Virginia =

Freeman, West Virginia may refer to:

- Freeman, Mercer County, West Virginia, a neighborhood of Bramwell, West Virginia
- Freeman, Upshur County, West Virginia, an unincorporated community in Upshur County, West Virginia
