= Alexander, West Virginia =

Unincorporated community in West Virginia, United States

- Unincorporated community
- Location within West Virginia Location within the United States
- Coordinates: 38°46′58″N 80°13′21″W
- Country: United States
- State: West Virginia
- County: Upshur
- Elevation: 1,850 ft (560 m)
- Time zone: UTC-5 (Eastern (EST))
  - Summer (DST): UTC-4 (EDT)
- Area codes: 304 & 681
- GNIS feature ID: 1549559

Alexander is an unincorporated community in Upshur County, West Virginia, United States. Alexander is located on County Route 11 and the Buckhannon River, 14.6 miles (23.5 km) south of Buckhannon. The coal hauling Beech Mountain Railroad (BEEM) also runs through and interchanges with the Appalachian and Ohio Railroad (A&O) in Alexander.

The community was named after John M. Alexander, a businessperson in the local lumber industry.
