= Frenchton, West Virginia =

Unincorporated community in West Virginia, United States

- Unincorporated community
- Location within West Virginia Location within the United States
- Coordinates: 38°52′22″N 80°21′23″W
- Country: United States
- State: West Virginia
- County: Upshur
- Elevation: 1,493 ft (455 m)
- Time zone: UTC-5 (Eastern (EST))
  - Summer (DST): UTC-4 (EDT)
- ZIP code: 26219
- Area codes: 304 & 681
- GNIS feature ID: 1539263

Frenchton is an unincorporated community in Upshur County, West Virginia, United States. Frenchton is 10.5 miles (16.9 km) southwest of Buckhannon. Frenchton has a post office with ZIP code 26219.

The community derives its name from nearby French Creek.
