= Hunter Fork =

Creek in West Virginia, United States

Coordinates: 39°04′23″N 79°54′53″W

Hunter Fork is a creek in Barbour County, West Virginia. It is a tributary of Sugar Creek, which flows into the Tygart Valley River.

Hunter Fork was so named on account of it being an area in which game is hunted.

A historic school named Hunter Fork School is built on the bank of Hunter Fork in Barbour County.

== See also ==
- List of rivers of West Virginia
