= Motawi Tileworks =

American ceramic art company

Motawi Tileworks was founded by Nawal Motawi (B.F.A. University of Michigan) in 1992. The company handcrafts art tiles in its Ann Arbor, Michigan studio. These tiles are known for their American designs, inspired by works of the Arts and Crafts Movement, and include such subjects as nature, art and architecture. Some of the artists whose work has been adapted by Motawi include Charley Harper, Dard Hunter and Frank Lloyd Wright.

Most tiles produced by Motawi are either styled in “Relief”, a low-relief sculpture colored with a single glaze, or “Polychrome”, a separation of several colors by a small ridge of clay.
