= Ellamore, West Virginia =

Unincorporated community in West Virginia, United States

- Unincorporated community
- Location within West Virginia Location within the United States
- Coordinates: 38°55′27″N 80°05′25″W
- Country: United States
- State: West Virginia
- Counties: Randolph and Upshur
- Elevation: 1,857 ft (566 m)

Population
  - Total: 102
- Time zone: UTC-5 (Eastern (EST))
  - Summer (DST): UTC-4 (EDT)
- ZIP code: 26267
- Area codes: 304 & 681
- GNIS feature ID: 1554388

Ellamore is an unincorporated community in Randolph and Upshur counties, West Virginia, United States. Ellamore is located on County Route 151 along the Middle Fork River, 8 miles (13 km) southeast of Buckhannon. Ellamore had a post office, which closed on July 11, 2009.

== History ==
The community was named for a lumber baron's wife, Ella Moore.
