= Gormley (disambiguation) =

Gormley is a surname of Irish origin. It may also refer to:

- Tad Gormley Stadium, New Orleans, Louisiana
- Gormley, Ontario, a community in York Region, Ontario, Canada
  - Gormley GO Station, a commuter rail station operated by GO Transit in the neighbourhood
- Gormley, West Virginia
- Gormley (horse) (born 2014), thoroughbred racehorse
