= Teeterville =

Teeterville may refer to:

- Teeterville, Ontario, a community in Norfolk County, Ontario, Canada
- Teeterville, Georgia, an unincorporated community in Lanier County, Georgia, United States
- Teeterville Public School, a school under the jurisdiction of Grand Erie District School Board in Norfolk County, Ontario, Canada
- Teeterville Pioneer Museum, a museum in Norfolk County, Ontario
- Teterville, Kansas or Teeterville, a ghost town whose post office operated 1927–1962
