= Daysville =

Daysville may refer to:

- Daysville, Illinois, an unincorporated community in Ogle County
- Daysville, West Virginia, an unincorporated community in Upshur County+

== See also ==
- Dayville (disambiguation)
