= Tygart Junction, West Virginia =

Tygart Junction
- Ghost town
- Location within the state of West Virginia Tygart Junction (the United States)
- Coordinates: 39°5′54″N 80°4′30″W
- Country: United States
- State: West Virginia
- County: Barbour
- Elevation: 1,335 ft (407 m)
- Time zone: UTC-5 (Eastern (EST))
  - Summer (DST): UTC-4 (EDT)
- GNIS ID: 1555846

Tygart Junction was an unincorporated community in Barbour County, West Virginia, USA, which was abandoned over a century ago. It was at the site of a B&O railroad junction at the confluence of the Buckhannon River with the Tygart Valley River.
