= Valley Bend, Randolph County, West Virginia =

Valley Bend, West Virginia
- Census-designated place
- Location within West Virginia Location within the United States
- Coordinates: 38°46′18″N 79°55′31″W
- Country: United States
- State: West Virginia
- County: Randolph

Area
  - Total: 1.408 sq mi (3.65 km^{2})
  - Land: 1.408 sq mi (3.65 km^{2})
  - Water: 0 sq mi (0 km^{2})
- Elevation: 2,028 ft (618 m)

Population (2020)
  - Total: 470
  - Density: 330/sq mi (130/km^{2})
- Time zone: UTC-5 (Eastern (EST))
  - Summer (DST): UTC-4 (EDT)
- ZIP code: 26293
- Area codes: 304 & 681
- GNIS feature ID: 2652421

Valley Bend is a census-designated place (CDP) in Randolph County, West Virginia, United States. Valley Bend is located on U.S. routes 219 and 250, as well as state routes 55 and 92, 3.5 miles (5.6 km) northwest of Mill Creek. Valley Bend has a post office with ZIP code 26293. As of the 2020 census, its population was 470 (down from 485 at the 2010 census).

The community was named for a nearby meander in the Tygart Valley River.
