= Blount, West Virginia =

Unincorporated community in West Virginia, United States

- Unincorporated community
- Location within West Virginia Location within the United States
- Coordinates: 38°19′16″N 81°25′35″W
- Country: United States
- State: West Virginia
- County: Kanawha
- Elevation: 791 ft (241 m)
- Time zone: UTC-5 (Eastern (EST))
  - Summer (DST): UTC-4 (EDT)
- ZIP code: 25025
- Area codes: 304 & 681
- GNIS feature ID: 1536116

Blount is an unincorporated community in Kanawha County, West Virginia, United States. Blount is 11 miles (18 km) east-southeast of Charleston. Blount had a post office, founded by Harry and Stella Blount which opened on October 30, 1946, and closed on October 24, 2009.
