= Ivy, West Virginia =

Ivy
- Unincorporated community
- Location within the state of West Virginia Ivy (the United States)
- Coordinates: 38°56′24″N 80°11′4″W
- Country: United States
- State: West Virginia
- County: Upshur
- Elevation: 1,690 ft (520 m)
- Time zone: UTC-5 (Eastern (EST))
  - Summer (DST): UTC-4 (EDT)
- GNIS ID: 1554787

Ivy is an unincorporated community in Upshur County, West Virginia, United States.
