= Salem Township, Greenwood County, Kansas =

Salem Township
- Township
- Location in Greenwood County
- Coordinates: 38°01′15″N 096°26′01″W
- Country: United States
- State: Kansas
- County: Greenwood

Area
  - Total: 90.72 sq mi (234.96 km^{2})
  - Land: 89.91 sq mi (232.87 km^{2})
  - Water: 0.81 sq mi (2.1 km^{2}) 0.89%
- Elevation: 1,565 ft (477 m)

Population (2020)
  - Total: 25
  - Density: 0.28/sq mi (0.11/km^{2})
- GNIS feature ID: 0474421

Salem Township is a township in Greenwood County, Kansas, United States. As of the 2020 census, its population was 25.

== Geography ==
Salem Township covers an area of 90.72 square miles (235.0 km^{2}) and contains no incorporated settlements. The ghost town of Teterville is located in the township.

The streams of Battle Creek and Swing Creek run through this township.
