= Craddock, West Virginia =

Unincorporated community in West Virginia, United States

Craddock
- Unincorporated community
- Location within the state of West Virginia Craddock (the United States)
- Coordinates: 38°43′21″N 80°15′58″W
- Country: United States
- State: West Virginia
- County: Upshur
- Elevation: 2,054 ft (626 m)
- Time zone: UTC-5 (Eastern (EST))
  - Summer (DST): UTC-4 (EDT)
- GNIS ID: 1554212

Craddock is an unincorporated community in Upshur County, West Virginia, United States.
