= McCuetown, West Virginia =

McCuetown
- Unincorporated community
- Location within the state of West Virginia McCuetown (the United States)
- Coordinates: 38°56′59″N 80°19′54″W
- Country: United States
- State: West Virginia
- County: Upshur
- Elevation: 1,237 ft (377 m)
- Time zone: UTC-5 (Eastern (EST))
  - Summer (DST): UTC-4 (EDT)
- GNIS ID: 1555082

McCuetown is an unincorporated community in Upshur County, West Virginia, United States.
