= Abbott, West Virginia =

Unincorporated community in West Virginia, United States

Abbott
- Unincorporated community
- Location within the state of West Virginia Abbott (the United States)
- Coordinates: 38°55′18″N 80°19′17″W
- Country: United States
- State: West Virginia
- County: Upshur
- Elevation: 1,489 ft (454 m)
- Time zone: UTC-5 (Eastern (EST))
  - Summer (DST): UTC-4 (EDT)
- GNIS ID: 1553685

Abbott is an unincorporated community in Upshur County, West Virginia, United States.

== History ==
A post office was established at Abbott in 1901, and remained in operation until 1942. The postmaster, Charles A. Abbott, gave the community his name.
