= White Oak, Upshur County, West Virginia =

White Oak, West Virginia
- Unincorporated community
- Location within West Virginia Location within the United States
- Coordinates: 39°04′20″N 80°15′21″W
- Country: United States
- State: West Virginia
- County: Upshur
- Elevation: 1,093 ft (333 m)
- Time zone: UTC-5 (Eastern (EST))
  - Summer (DST): UTC-4 (EDT)
- Area codes: 304 & 681
- GNIS feature ID: 1696807

White Oak is an unincorporated community in Upshur County, West Virginia, United States. White Oak is 5.5 miles (8.9 km) north-northwest of Buckhannon.
