= Post Mill, West Virginia =

Post Mill
- Unincorporated community
- Location within the state of West Virginia Post Mill (the United States)
- Coordinates: 39°0′47″N 80°11′33″W
- Country: United States
- State: West Virginia
- County: Upshur
- Elevation: 1,421 ft (433 m)
- Time zone: UTC-5 (Eastern (EST))
  - Summer (DST): UTC-4 (EDT)
- GNIS ID: 1696757

Post Mill was an unincorporated community in Upshur County, West Virginia, United States.
