= Maybelle =

Maybelle is a feminine given name that may refer to

- Maybelle Blair (born 1927), American baseball player
- Maybelle Carter (1909–1978), American country musician
- Maybelle Gilliland (1906–1971), American track athlete
- Maybelle Goodlander (1882–1959), American photographer
- Maybelle Marston (1895–1983), American contralto
- Maybelle Stephens Mitchell (1872–1919), American suffragist
- Maybelle Maud Park (1871–1946), American physician
- Maybelle Reichardt (1907–1999), American discus thrower
- Maybelle Stamper (1907–1995), American printmaker
- Big Maybelle (1924–1972), American R&B singer

== See also ==
- Maybelle and Ezra Carter House in Scott County, Virginia, U.S.
