= Hinkleville, West Virginia =

Hinkleville
- Unincorporated community
- Location within the state of West Virginia Hinkleville (the United States)
- Coordinates: 38°55′36″N 80°15′44″W
- Country: United States
- State: West Virginia
- County: Upshur
- Elevation: 1,608 ft (490 m)
- Time zone: UTC-5 (Eastern (EST))
  - Summer (DST): UTC-4 (EDT)
- GNIS ID: 1540316

Hinkleville is an unincorporated community in Upshur County, West Virginia, United States. As of the 2020 census, Hinkleville had a population of 366.

The community was named after Abraham Hinkle, the proprietor of a local sawmill.
