= Falling Rock, West Virginia =

Unincorporated community in West Virginia, United States

- Unincorporated community
- Location within West Virginia Location within the United States
- Coordinates: 38°28′08″N 81°24′06″W
- Country: United States
- State: West Virginia
- County: Kanawha
- Elevation: 623 ft (190 m)
- Time zone: UTC-5 (Eastern (EST))
  - Summer (DST): UTC-4 (EDT)
- ZIP code: 25079
- Area codes: 304 & 681

Falling Rock is an unincorporated community in Kanawha County, West Virginia, United States. Falling Rock is located at the confluence of Falling Rock Creek with the Elk River 3 miles (4.8 km) southwest of Clendenin along US Route 19. Falling Rock has a post office with ZIP code 25079.

The community takes its name from nearby Falling Rock Creek.
