= Kanawha Head, West Virginia =

- Unincorporated community
- Location within West Virginia Location within the United States
- Coordinates: 38°46′22″N 80°20′47″W
- Country: United States
- State: West Virginia
- County: Upshur
- Elevation: 1,696 ft (517 m)
- Time zone: UTC-5 (Eastern (EST))
  - Summer (DST): UTC-4 (EDT)
- ZIP code: 26228
- Area codes: 304 & 681
- GNIS feature ID: 1554843

Kanawha Head is an unincorporated community in Upshur County, West Virginia, United States. Kanawha Head is located on West Virginia Route 20, 16.5 miles (26.6 km) south-southwest of Buckhannon. Kanawha Head had a post office with ZIP code 26228.

The community takes its name from the nearby Little Kanawha River.
