= Queens, West Virginia =

Queens
- Unincorporated community
- Location within the state of West Virginia Queens (the United States)
- Coordinates: 38°51′25″N 80°8′12″W
- Country: United States
- State: West Virginia
- County: Upshur
- Elevation: 1,946 ft (593 m)
- Time zone: UTC-5 (Eastern (EST))
  - Summer (DST): UTC-4 (EDT)
- GNIS ID: 1555426

Queens is an unincorporated community in Upshur County, West Virginia, United States.

== Etymology ==
The community was named after Armstead Charles Queen, the proprietor of a local mill.
