= Carter, West Virginia =

Unincorporated community in West Virginia, United States

Carter
- Location within West Virginia Location within the United States
- Coordinates: 38°50′40″N 80°16′56″W
- Country: United States
- State: West Virginia
- County: Upshur

Carter is an unincorporated community in Upshur County, West Virginia, United States. Carter is served by the French Creek Post Office and its Zip Code: 26218.

The unincorporated community of Carter lies at the three-way junction of County Route 11 (Alexander-Helvetia road), Natural Bridge Road, and Waterloo Road.

Carter was named for a prominent family of Baptist preachers originally from Albemarle County, Virginia that settled in Sago in the 1840s. Henry T. Carter at first resided on the farm of a Mr. Alfred Morgan in the Sago area. He later bought land about two miles south and reared a large family. He had married a Miss Emerson. He was a highly respected citizen of the community and was a very industrious man. He was renowned for his reliable memory. For many years, he served as one of the deacons for the Sago Baptist church. His ten children were named John, Mary, Henry, Thomas Addison, Mardonius, George, Page, Eliza, Lena, and Delia. Mardonius died young from scarlet fever.
