= Red Rock, West Virginia =

Red Rock
- Unincorporated community
- Location within the state of West Virginia Red Rock (the United States)
- Coordinates: 39°0′43″N 80°16′34″W
- Country: United States
- State: West Virginia
- County: Upshur
- Elevation: 1,447 ft (441 m)
- Time zone: UTC-5 (Eastern (EST))
  - Summer (DST): UTC-4 (EDT)
- GNIS ID: 1555454

Red Rock is an unincorporated community in Upshur County, West Virginia, United States. It is located about 4.5 kilometres (2.8 mi) northeast of the county seat of Buckhannon, West Virginia.
