= Overhill, West Virginia =

Overhill
- Unincorporated community
- Location within the state of West Virginia Overhill (the United States)
- Coordinates: 38°57′43″N 80°9′5″W
- Country: United States
- State: West Virginia
- County: Upshur
- Elevation: 1,555 ft (474 m)
- Time zone: UTC-5 (Eastern (EST))
  - Summer (DST): UTC-4 (EDT)
- GNIS ID: 1555286

Overhill is an unincorporated community in Upshur County, West Virginia, United States.
