= Tallmansville, West Virginia =

Unincorporated community in West Virginia, US

Tallmansville
- Unincorporated community
- Location within the state of West Virginia Tallmansville (the United States)
- Coordinates: 38°54′48″N 80°10′48″W
- Country: United States
- State: West Virginia
- County: Upshur

Population (2000)
  - Total: 418
- Time zone: UTC-5 (Eastern (EST))
  - Summer (DST): UTC-4 (EDT)
- ZIP codes: 26237

Tallmansville is an unincorporated community in Upshur County, West Virginia, United States. The ZIP code of Tallmansville is 26237; its ZCTA had a population of 418 at the 2000 census.

The community of Tallmansville received its name, honoring their first postmaster Benjamin Tallman, in 1869. According to the Geographic Names Information System, the town has also had the toponyms Stroder and Strader Station in the past.
