= Dodges Corners, Wisconsin =

- Ghost town
- Location within Wisconsin
- Coordinates: 42°51′32″N 88°14′30″W
- Country: United States
- State: Wisconsin
- County: Waukesha
- Elevation: 860 ft (260 m)
- GNIS feature ID: 2760400

Dodges Corners is a ghost town in the village of Vernon, Waukesha County, Wisconsin, United States. One notable native was Maybelle Maud Park (1871-1946), a medical doctor and Wisconsin state official.
