= Imperial, West Virginia =

Imperial
- Unincorporated community
- Location within the state of West Virginia Imperial (the United States)
- Coordinates: 38°51′45″N 80°12′15″W
- Country: United States
- State: West Virginia
- County: Upshur
- Elevation: 1,654 ft (504 m)
- Time zone: UTC-5 (Eastern (EST))
  - Summer (DST): UTC-4 (EDT)
- ZIP codes: 26226
- GNIS ID: 1554764

Imperial is an unincorporated community in Upshur County, West Virginia, United States.

The community most likely was named after the local Imperial Glass Sand Company.

== History ==
=== Industrial Origins ===
The community was a hub for the Imperial Glass Sand Company, which was vital to the glassmaking industry in the Ohio River Valley. The company mined high-quality silica sand from the Oriskany sands formation, which was then shipped by rail to glassworks in places like Bellaire, Ohio.

=== Regional Geography ===
Imperial is one of 68 unincorporated communities in Upshur County. The county itself was created on March 26, 1851, from parts of Barbour, Lewis, and Randolph counties.

Imperial is served by the ZIP code 26226. This ZIP code is primarily associated with the nearby community of French Creek, which serves as the local postal hub for the Imperial area.
