= Evergreen, West Virginia =

Unincorporated community in West Virginia, United States

Evergreen
- Unincorporated community
- Location within the state of West Virginia Evergreen (the United States)
- Coordinates: 38°51′15″N 80°15′29″W
- Country: United States
- State: West Virginia
- County: Upshur
- Elevation: 1,676 ft (511 m)
- Time zone: UTC-5 (Eastern (EST))
  - Summer (DST): UTC-4 (EDT)
- GNIS ID: 1538764

Evergreen is an unincorporated community in Upshur County, West Virginia.
