= Wilsontown, West Virginia =

Wilsontown
- Unincorporated community
- Location within the state of West Virginia Wilsontown (the United States)
- Coordinates: 38°49′16″N 80°20′19″W
- Country: United States
- State: West Virginia
- County: Upshur
- Elevation: 1,549 ft (472 m)
- Time zone: UTC-5 (Eastern (EST))
  - Summer (DST): UTC-4 (EDT)
- GNIS ID: 1549994

Wilsontown is an unincorporated community in Upshur County, West Virginia, United States.
