= Beans Mill, West Virginia =

Unincorporated community in West Virginia, United States

Beans Mill
- Unincorporated community
- Location within the state of West Virginia Beans Mill (the United States)
- Coordinates: 38°49′55″N 80°12′2″W
- Country: United States
- State: West Virginia
- County: Upshur
- Elevation: 1,772 ft (540 m)
- Time zone: UTC-5 (Eastern (EST))
  - Summer (DST): UTC-4 (EDT)
- GNIS ID: 1549581

Beans Mill is an unincorporated community in Upshur County, West Virginia, United States.
