= Tenmile Creek (Buckhannon River tributary) =

Stream in West Virginia, U.S.

Coordinates: 38°52′30″N 80°10′29″W

Tenmile Creek is a stream in the U.S. state of West Virginia. It is a tributary of Buckhannon River.

Tenmile Creek was named for its length, approximately 10 miles (16 km) long.

== See also ==
- List of rivers of West Virginia
