= Midville =

Midville may refer to:

- Midville, Georgia, a city in the United States
- Midville, Lincolnshire, a village in the United Kingdom

== See also ==
- Midvale (disambiguation)
- Mudville (disambiguation)
