= French Creek, West Virginia =

Unincorporated community in West Virginia, United States

French Creek
- Unincorporated community
- Location within the state of West Virginia French Creek (the United States)
- Coordinates: 38°53′8″N 80°17′50″W
- Country: United States
- State: West Virginia
- County: Upshur
- Elevation: 1,460 ft (450 m)
- Time zone: UTC-5 (Eastern (EST))
  - Summer (DST): UTC-4 (EDT)
- ZIP code: 26218
- GNIS feature ID: 1554511

French Creek is an unincorporated community in Upshur County, West Virginia, United States.

French Creek is 9½ miles south of the county seat, Buckhannon, on West Virginia Route 20. It is home to the West Virginia State Wildlife Center — formerly the "French Creek Game Farm" — a zoological park featuring native and introduced fauna. Popular exhibits at the center include American bison, North American river otters, black bears and mountain lions.

== History ==
French Creek was settled in the early 19th century by a number of New England Presbyterians. Family names from these settlers include Gould, Young, Phillips, Burr, Sexton, Brooks, Alden and Loomis. The community's first post office, only the second established in the county, opened in 1822. The community takes its name from nearby French Creek, a tributary of the Buckhannon River watershed. The village was also referred to as Meadeville, as it is located in the magisterial Meade District. French Creek was also known "Snatchburg" for some time in the 1800s, said to be a reference to the perceived rapaciousness of local merchants.

The French Creek Presbyterian Church was listed on the National Register of Historic Places in 1974. The land was donated to the church by the Young family.

Ralph "Boone" Young lived on Bush Run Road in French Creek, where he once kept bobcats and other wild animals. His animals became a visiting point of sort over time. He was a trapper and one of the founders of the Game Farm, (now called the West Virginia State Wildlife Center).

== Notable person ==
- Maurice Graham Brooks (1900–93), biologist, forester and celebrated authority on Appalachian natural history.

== See also ==
- West Virginia State Wildlife Center
