= Lyburn, West Virginia =

- Unincorporated community
- Location within West Virginia Location within the United States
- Coordinates: 37°48′7″N 81°55′52″W
- Country: United States
- State: West Virginia
- County: Logan
- Time zone: UTC-5 (Eastern (EST))
  - Summer (DST): UTC-4 (EDT)
- ZIP code: 25632
- Area codes: 304 and 681
- GNIS feature ID: 1555011

Lyburn is an unincorporated mining community in Logan County, West Virginia, United States. Lyburn is also the home of the Bearwallow trailhead for the Hatfield-Mccoy ATV trail.

== Mining accident ==
In 2002, a slurry pond break in the head of a hollow past Lyburn Post Office Road flooded more than ten residences. The pond, called "Pond 8A" is part of the Tower Mountain Surface Mine, which is operated by Bandmill Coal Corporation, a subsidiary of Massey Energy. The mine was originally permitted by Elkay Mining Company, a Pittston subsidiary, but was recently taken over by Bandmill. There are more than ten ponds on the mine site.
