= Shahan, West Virginia =

Shahan
- Unincorporated community
- Location within the state of West Virginia Shahan (the United States)
- Coordinates: 38°45′43″N 80°10′4″W
- Country: United States
- State: West Virginia
- County: Upshur
- Elevation: 2,028 ft (618 m)
- Time zone: UTC-5 (Eastern (EST))
  - Summer (DST): UTC-4 (EDT)
- GNIS ID: 1555596

Shahan is an unincorporated community in Upshur County, West Virginia, United States.
