= Swamp Run, West Virginia =

Swamp Run
- Unincorporated community
- Location within the state of West Virginia Swamp Run (the United States)
- Coordinates: 39°1′28″N 80°4′29″W
- Country: United States
- State: West Virginia
- County: Upshur
- Elevation: 1,959 ft (597 m)
- Time zone: UTC-5 (Eastern (EST))
  - Summer (DST): UTC-4 (EDT)
- GNIS ID: 1696789

Swamp Run is an unincorporated community in Upshur County, West Virginia, United States.
