= Teter, West Virginia =

Teter
- Unincorporated community
- Location within the state of West Virginia Teter (the United States)
- Coordinates: 39°3′42″N 80°9′27″W
- Country: United States
- State: West Virginia
- County: Upshur
- Elevation: 1,411 ft (430 m)
- Time zone: UTC-5 (Eastern (EST))
  - Summer (DST): UTC-4 (EDT)
- GNIS ID: 1555795

Teter is an unincorporated community in Upshur County, West Virginia, United States.

== See also ==
- Teterville, Kansas
