= White Oak, Ritchie County, West Virginia =

White Oak, West Virginia
- Unincorporated community
- Location within West Virginia Location within the United States
- Coordinates: 39°11′08″N 80°54′24″W
- Country: United States
- State: West Virginia
- County: Ritchie
- Elevation: 817 ft (249 m)
- Time zone: UTC-5 (Eastern (EST))
  - Summer (DST): UTC-4 (EDT)
- Area codes: 304 & 681
- GNIS feature ID: 1689087

White Oak is an unincorporated community in Ritchie County, West Virginia, United States. White Oak is 2.5 miles (4.0 km) east of Pullman.
