= Palace Valley, West Virginia =

Palace Valley
- Unincorporated community
- Location within the state of West Virginia Palace Valley (the United States)
- Coordinates: 39°45′19″N 80°9′26″W
- Country: United States
- State: West Virginia
- County: Upshur
- Elevation: 2,090 ft (640 m)
- Time zone: UTC-5 (Eastern (EST))
  - Summer (DST): UTC-4 (EDT)
- GNIS ID: 1549867

Palace Valley is an unincorporated community in Upshur County, West Virginia, United States.
