= Middle Valley =

Middle Valley may refer to:

- Middle Valley, New Zealand, a locality in the Mackenzie District
- Middle Valley, New Jersey, United States
- Middle Valley, Tennessee, United States

== See also ==
- Midvale (disambiguation)
