= Hodgesville, West Virginia =

Hodgesville
- Unincorporated community
- Hodgesville
- Location within the state of West Virginia Hodgesville (the United States)
- Coordinates: 39°3′57″N 80°11′39″W
- Country: United States
- State: West Virginia
- County: Upshur
- Elevation: 1,424 ft (434 m)
- Time zone: UTC-5 (Eastern (EST))
  - Summer (DST): UTC-4 (EDT)
- GNIS ID: 1540336

Hodgesville is an unincorporated community in Upshur County, West Virginia, United States. It is a crossroads community, at the place where WV Route 20 intersects with Hacker's Creek Road heading west, and Teter Road heading east.

The community has one elementary school, Hodgesville Elementary that houses grades K-5.

Hodgesville is also the home to the Warren District Volunteer Fire Department.
