= Zion, West Virginia =

Zion
- Unincorporated community
- Location within the state of West Virginia Zion (the United States)
- Coordinates: 38°46′24″N 80°15′52″W
- Country: United States
- State: West Virginia
- County: Upshur
- Elevation: 2,293 ft (699 m)
- Time zone: UTC-5 (Eastern (EST))
  - Summer (DST): UTC-4 (EDT)
- GNIS ID: 1696811

Zion is an unincorporated community in Upshur County, West Virginia, United States.
