= Kedron, West Virginia =

Kedron
- Unincorporated community
- Location within the state of West Virginia Kedron (the United States)
- Coordinates: 38°53′45″N 80°7′39″W
- Country: United States
- State: West Virginia
- County: Upshur
- Elevation: 1,841 ft (561 m)
- Time zone: UTC-5 (Eastern (EST))
  - Summer (DST): UTC-4 (EDT)
- GNIS ID: 1554852

Kedron is an unincorporated community in Upshur County, West Virginia, United States.

The community derives its name from Kidron Valley in West Asia.
