= Dayville =

Dayville may refer to one of these U.S. locations:

- Dayville, Alaska, a locale
- Dayville (CDP), Connecticut, a populated place
  - Dayville Historic District, a National Register of Historic Places-listed area within the CDP
- Dayville, Massachusetts, a populated place
- Dayville, Oregon, a city in Grant County

== See also ==
- Daysville
