= Gould, West Virginia =

Unincorporated community in West Virginia, United States

Gould
- Unincorporated community
- Location within the state of West Virginia Gould (the United States)
- Coordinates: 38°54′3″N 80°15′19″W
- Country: United States
- State: West Virginia
- County: Upshur
- Elevation: 1,453 ft (443 m)
- Time zone: UTC-5 (Eastern (EST))
  - Summer (DST): UTC-4 (EDT)
- GNIS ID: 1554587

Gould is an unincorporated community in Upshur County, West Virginia, United States.
