= Five Forks, Upshur County, West Virginia =

Unincorporated community in West Virginia, United States

Five Forks
- Unincorporated community
- Location within the state of West Virginia Five Forks (the United States)
- Coordinates: 39°0′22″N 80°5′59″W
- Country: United States
- State: West Virginia
- County: Upshur
- Elevation: 1,890 ft (580 m)
- Time zone: UTC-5 (Eastern (EST))
  - Summer (DST): UTC-4 (EDT)
- GNIS ID: 1549683

Five Forks is an unincorporated community in Upshur County, West Virginia, United States.
