= Kesling Mill, West Virginia =

Kesling Mill
- Unincorporated community
- Location within the state of West Virginia Kesling Mill (the United States)
- Coordinates: 39°0′19″N 80°8′32″W
- Country: United States
- State: West Virginia
- County: Upshur
- Elevation: 1,430 ft (440 m)
- Time zone: UTC-5 (Eastern (EST))
  - Summer (DST): UTC-4 (EDT)
- GNIS ID: 1554865

Kesling Mill is an unincorporated community in Upshur County, West Virginia, United States.
