= South Buckhannon, West Virginia =

South Buckhannon
- Unincorporated community
- Location within the state of West Virginia South Buckhannon (the United States)
- Coordinates: 38°58′55″N 80°13′16″W
- Country: United States
- State: West Virginia
- County: Upshur
- Elevation: 1,434 ft (437 m)
- Time zone: UTC-5 (Eastern (EST))
  - Summer (DST): UTC-4 (EDT)
- GNIS ID: 1696781

South Buckhannon was an unincorporated community in Upshur County, West Virginia, United States. It has since been annexed and become a neighborhood of Buckhannon, West Virginia.
