= Freeman, Upshur County, West Virginia =

Unincorporated community in West Virginia, United States

Freeman, West Virginia
- Unincorporated community
- Location within West Virginia Location within the United States
- Coordinates: 38°55′04″N 80°19′42″W
- Country: United States
- State: West Virginia
- County: Upshur
- Elevation: 1,519 ft (463 m)
- Time zone: UTC-5 (Eastern (EST))
  - Summer (DST): UTC-4 (EDT)
- Area codes: 304 & 681
- GNIS feature ID: 1554506

Freeman is an unincorporated community in Upshur County, West Virginia, United States. Freeman is 7.5 miles (12.1 km) southwest of Buckhannon, which is the only incorporated city in Upshur County.
