= Yokum, West Virginia =

Yokum
- Unincorporated community
- Location within the state of West Virginia Yokum (the United States)
- Coordinates: 38°58′30″N 80°3′45″W
- Country: United States
- State: West Virginia
- County: Upshur
- Elevation: 1,847 ft (563 m)
- Time zone: UTC-5 (Eastern (EST))
  - Summer (DST): UTC-4 (EDT)
- GNIS ID: 1556039

Yokum is an unincorporated community in Upshur County, West Virginia, United States.
