= Heavener Grove, West Virginia =

Heavener Grove
- Unincorporated community
- Location within the state of West Virginia Heavener Grove (the United States)
- Coordinates: 38°58′46″N 80°10′36″W
- Country: United States
- State: West Virginia
- County: Upshur
- Elevation: 1,703 ft (519 m)
- Time zone: UTC-5 (Eastern (EST))
  - Summer (DST): UTC-4 (EDT)
- GNIS ID: 1554674

Heavener Grove is an unincorporated community in Upshur County, West Virginia, United States.
