= Riffle Creek =

Stream in West Virginia, U.S.

Coordinates: 38°42′01″N 79°58′51″W

Riffle Creek is a stream in the U.S. state of West Virginia. It is a tributary of the Tygart Valley River.

Riffle Creek has the name of Frank Riffle.

== See also ==
- List of rivers of West Virginia
