= Gaines, West Virginia =

Unincorporated community in West Virginia, United States

Gaines
- Unincorporated community
- Location within the state of West Virginia Gaines (the United States)
- Coordinates: 38°46′49″N 80°19′12″W
- Country: United States
- State: West Virginia
- County: Upshur
- Elevation: 1,732 ft (528 m)
- Time zone: UTC-5 (Eastern (EST))
  - Summer (DST): UTC-4 (EDT)
- GNIS ID: 1554522

Gaines is an unincorporated community in Upshur County, West Virginia, United States.

The community was named in honor of U.S. Representative Joseph H. Gaines.
