= Mudville =

Mudville may refer to:

- Mudville, a fictional town in the poem Casey at the Bat
  - Stockton Ports, renamed Mudville Nine from 2000 to 2002
  - Visalia Rawhide, a minor league baseball team in California that plays one game each season as the Mudville Nine
- Mudville (band), a post-trip-hop band from New York City
- Mudville, Holliston, Massachusetts

== See also ==
- Midville (disambiguation)
