= Charley Harper =

American Modernist artist (1922–2007)

- Born: Charles Burton Harper; August 4, 1922; Frenchton, West Virginia
- Died: June 10, 2007 (aged 84); Cincinnati, Ohio, U.S.
- Education: Art Academy of Cincinnati
- Known for: Wildlife art
- Movement: Modernist
- Spouse: Edie McKee Harper (m. 1947)
- Children: Brett Harper
- Awards: Sharonville Fine Arts Council Lifetime Achievement Award
- Website: www.charleyharperartstudio.com

An example of Charley Harper's work ("Red & Fed")

Charley Harper (August 4, 1922 – June 10, 2007) was a Cincinnati-based American Modernist artist. He was best known for his highly stylized wildlife prints, posters, and book illustrations. Born Charles Burton Harper in Frenchton, West Virginia, in 1922, Harper's upbringing on his family farm influenced his work to his last days. He left his farm home to study art at the Art Academy of Cincinnati and won the academy's first Stephen H. Wilder Traveling Scholarship. Also, during his time at the Academy, and supposedly on the first day, Charley met fellow artist Edie McKee, whom he married shortly after graduation in 1947.

In 1953, a Ford Motor Company publication offered this biographical sketch: "While Charles Harper was a freshman at West Virginia Wesleyan College, he was advised, after an aptitude test, to study journalism. Something inside him said no, and the following year he enrolled in the Cincinnati Art Academy. After a [WWII] tour of duty with the 104th Infantry in Europe, he, aided by an art scholarship, went on a four-months' painting tour of the country with his bride. He worked in a Cincinnati studio as a commercial artist by day and in his home as a fine artist by night."

Charley and Edie's honeymoon travel, mainly in the West and South, was supported by the Stephen H. Wilder Scholarship the Academy awarded to Charley for post-graduate travels. Charley Harper returned to the Art Academy of Cincinnati as a teacher and also worked for a commercial firm before working on his own. He and his wife worked out of their Roselawn and Finneytown homes, and later, with their only child, Brett Harper, formed Harper Studios.

During his career, Charley Harper illustrated numerous books, notably The Golden Book of Biology, magazines such as Ford Times, as well as many prints, posters, and other works. As his subjects are mainly natural, with birds prominently featured, Charley often created works for many nature-based organizations, among them the National Park Service, Cincinnati Zoo, Cincinnati Nature Center, Cornell Lab of Ornithology, Hamilton County (Ohio) Park District, and Hawk Mountain Sanctuary in Pennsylvania. He also designed interpretive displays for Everglades National Park.

Charley Harper died in Cincinnati on Sunday, June 10, 2007, at age 84, after contending with pneumonia for some months.

== Style ==
In a style he called "minimal realism", Charley Harper captured the essence of his subjects with the fewest possible visual elements. When asked to describe his unique visual style, Charley responded:

When I look at a wildlife or nature subject, I don't see the feathers in the wings, I just count the wings. I see exciting shapes, color combinations, patterns, textures, fascinating behavior, and endless possibilities for making interesting pictures. I regard the picture as an ecosystem in which all the elements are interrelated, interdependent, perfectly balanced, without trimming or unutilized parts; and herein lies the lure of painting; in a world of chaos, the picture is one small rectangle in which the artist can create an ordered universe.

He contrasted his nature-oriented artwork with the realism of John James Audubon, drawing influence from Cubism, Minimalism, Einsteinian physics and countless other developments in Modern art and science. His style distilled and simplified complex organisms and natural subjects, yet they are often arranged in a complex fashion. On the subject of his simplified forms, Harper noted:

I don't think there was much resistance to the way I simplified things. I think everybody understood that. Some people liked it and others didn't care for it. There's some who want to count all the feathers in the wings and then others who never think about counting the feathers, like me.

The results are bold, colorful, and often whimsical. The designer Todd Oldham wrote of Harper, "Charley's inspired yet the accurate color sense is undeniable, and when combined with the precision he exacts on rendering only the most important details, one is always left with a sense of awe." Charley, on numerous examples, also went outside the medium of graphic art and included short prose poems for the artwork he made.

Examples of Harper's style may be seen in the example above, as well as the following United States National Park Service posters: In 2002 his artwork was selected for the International Migratory Bird Day conservation theme- Exploring Habitats.

== Honors ==
In honor of Charley Harper's work, December 8, 2006, was declared "Charley Harper Day" by the mayor of Cincinnati, Mark Mallory.

In 2003, the Sharonville Fine Arts Council awarded Harper a Lifetime Achievement Award.

In 2007, an exhibition of the Harpers' early work was held at the Cincinnati Art Museum.

In 2011, the first exhibition of Harper's works in Germany took place at Kunstverein in Hamburg.

In 2020, Harper was posthumously awarded the John A. Ruthven Medal of Distinction.

In 2021, an exhibit of some of Harper's work at the Cincinnati Museum Center.

Great Parks of Hamilton County (Ohio) named part of Winton Woods, Harper Meadows, after Harper. The area contains many reservable shelters, a playground, a snow sledding hill, and is adjacent to the lake, and the hike/bike trail.
