= Nebo, Upshur County, West Virginia =

Nebo, West Virginia
- Unincorporated community
- Location within West Virginia Location within the United States
- Coordinates: 38°59′18″N 80°05′04″W
- Country: United States
- State: West Virginia
- County: Upshur
- Elevation: 2,103 ft (641 m)
- Time zone: UTC-5 (Eastern (EST))
  - Summer (DST): UTC-4 (EDT)
- Area codes: 304 & 681
- GNIS feature ID: 1549846

Nebo is an unincorporated community in Upshur County, West Virginia, United States. Nebo is 7.5 miles (12.1 km) east of Buckhannon.
