= Reger, West Virginia =

Reger
- Unincorporated community
- Location within the state of West Virginia Reger (the United States)
- Coordinates: 38°58′55″N 80°11′27″W
- Country: United States
- State: West Virginia
- County: Upshur
- Elevation: 1,617 ft (493 m)
- Time zone: UTC-5 (Eastern (EST))
  - Summer (DST): UTC-4 (EDT)
- GNIS ID: 1555462

Reger is an unincorporated community in Upshur County, West Virginia, United States.
