= French Creek (Buckhannon River tributary) =

Stream in West Virginia, U.S.

Coordinates: 38°56′12″N 80°14′15″W

French Creek is a stream in the U.S. state of West Virginia. It is a tributary of the Buckhannon River.

French Creek most likely was named for the fact French explorers visited the area in the 18th century.

== See also ==
- List of rivers of West Virginia
- French Creek, West Virginia
