= Greenville, Logan County, West Virginia =

Greenville, West Virginia
- Census-designated place
- Location within West Virginia Location within the United States
- Coordinates: 37°43′15″N 81°52′18″W
- Country: United States
- State: West Virginia
- County: Logan

Area
  - Total: 0.16 sq mi (0.41 km^{2})
  - Land: 0.14 sq mi (0.37 km^{2})
  - Water: 0.015 sq mi (0.04 km^{2})
- Elevation: 755 ft (230 m)

Population (2020)
  - Total: 243
- Time zone: UTC-5 (Eastern (EST))
  - Summer (DST): UTC-4 (EDT)
- ZIP Code: 25635 (Man)
- Area codes: 304 & 681
- GNIS feature ID: 1539722
- FIPS code: 54-33604

Greenville is an unincorporated community and census-designated place (CDP) in Logan County, West Virginia, United States. It was first listed as a CDP prior to the 2020 census.

== Geography ==
Greenville is located in southern Logan County on the west side of the Guyandotte River 1.5 miles (2.4 km) south of Man and 14 miles (23 km) south of Logan, the county seat.

According to the U.S. Census Bureau, the Greenville CDP has a total area of 0.2 square miles (0.4 km^{2}), of which 0.02 square miles (0.04 km^{2}), or 9.92%, are water.
