= White Oak, Raleigh County, West Virginia =

White Oak, West Virginia
- Unincorporated community
- Location within West Virginia Location within the United States
- Coordinates: 37°41′34″N 81°04′22″W
- Country: United States
- State: West Virginia
- County: Raleigh
- Elevation: 2,838 ft (865 m)
- Time zone: UTC-5 (Eastern (EST))
  - Summer (DST): UTC-4 (EDT)
- ZIP code: 25989
- Area codes: 304 & 681
- GNIS feature ID: 1549031

White Oak is an unincorporated community in Raleigh County, West Virginia, United States. White Oak is located on West Virginia Route 3, 1.5 miles (2.4 km) southeast of Shady Spring. White Oak has a post office with ZIP code 25989.
