= Conley Run =

Stream in West Virginia, United States

Coordinates: 38°34′28″N 80°02′12″W

Conley Run is a stream in the U.S. state of West Virginia.

Conley Run most likely was named after Darby Connolly, a settler who was killed by Indians.

== See also ==
- List of rivers of West Virginia
