= Davisville, West Virginia =

Unincorporated community in West Virginia, United States

Davisville
- Unincorporated community
- Location within the state of West Virginia Davisville (the United States)
- Coordinates: 39°12′4″N 81°29′54″W
- Country: United States
- State: West Virginia
- County: Wood
- Time zone: UTC-5 (Eastern (EST))
  - Summer (DST): UTC-4 (EDT)
- ZIP codes: 26142

Davisville (also Clairville or Claysville) is an unincorporated community in Wood County, West Virginia, United States. Its elevation is 620 feet (189 m). It has a post office with the ZIP code 26142. The North Bend Rail Trail passes through the community.
