= Ruraldale, West Virginia =

Ruraldale
- Unincorporated community
- Location within the state of West Virginia Ruraldale (the United States)
- Coordinates: 39°4′1″N 80°13′54″W
- Country: United States
- State: West Virginia
- County: Upshur
- Elevation: 1,188 ft (362 m)
- Time zone: UTC-5 (Eastern (EST))
  - Summer (DST): UTC-4 (EDT)
- GNIS ID: 1555540

Ruraldale is an unincorporated community in Upshur County, West Virginia, United States. It lies along Hacker's Creek Road. Ruraldale is home to one place of worship, Pleasant Valley Methodist Church.
