= Sand Run, West Virginia =

Sand Run
- Unincorporated community
- Location within the state of West Virginia Sand Run (the United States)
- Coordinates: 38°55′23″N 80°7′27″W
- Country: United States
- State: West Virginia
- County: Upshur
- Elevation: 1,962 ft (598 m)
- Time zone: UTC-5 (Eastern (EST))
  - Summer (DST): UTC-4 (EDT)
- GNIS ID: 1555564

Sand Run is an unincorporated community in Upshur County, West Virginia, United States.
