= Maybelle Maud Park =

American physician

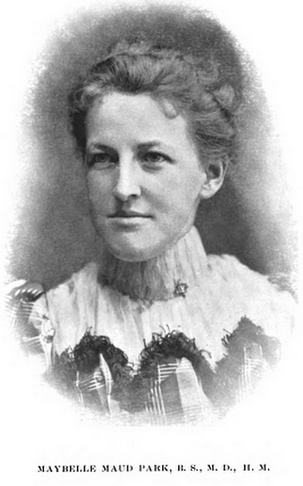
- Maybelle Maud Park, from a 1900 publication.
- Born: January 7, 1871; Dodges Corners, Wisconsin
- Died: 1946 (aged 74–75)
- Occupation: medical doctor
- Known for: Founding director of Wisconsin's child welfare department (1922-1923)

Maybelle Maud Park (January 7, 1871 – 1946) was an American medical doctor based in Wisconsin. She served as director of the child welfare department of the State Board of Control when it was founded in 1922.

== Early life ==
Maybelle Maud Park was born in Dodges Corners, Wisconsin, youngest of the eight children of John Wait Park and Sarah Luella Thomas Park. Her older sister Meriel graduated from the University of Wisconsin in 1884, and two of their brothers earned law degrees there. Another sister, Dora Park Putnam, was an artist based in Milwaukee.

Maybelle Park attended Carroll College in Waukesha, then the University of Wisconsin, where she earned a bachelor of science degree in 1891. She earned her medical degree at the Women's Medical College of Pennsylvania in 1894, and did further studies in Philadelphia for a Master of Homeopathics, granted in 1895.

== Career ==
Park presented a paper on the homeopathic treatment of smallpox at the Organon and Materia Medica Society of Philadelphia meeting in 1895. She was elected County Physician of Waukesha County, Wisconsin, in 1897, and re-elected to the post in 1898. She was the first woman to serve as County Physician in the state. From 1901 to 1908 she was assistant physician at the Waukesha Springs Sanitarium.

Park spoke to community groups on public health topics, and in support of women's suffrage. In an 1896 speech on "Modern Surgery" before the Woman's Club of Waukesha, she explained her belief that "Bacteria will be found to be the benefactor not the terror of the human race, turning noxious, toxic substances into inert forms which can be taken up by plants and in that form again used by animals."

By 1914, Park had moved to Seattle, Washington, where she was assistant medical inspector for the public schools, and served on the advisory board of the Theodora Home, a shelter for mothers and children in Ravenna Heights. She was an officer of the Seattle Council of Women Voters, and a member of the Medical Women's Club of Seattle, the King County Medical Society, and the Washington State Medical Association.

Park moved back to Wisconsin in 1922, to organize and direct the new Juvenile Department of the State Board of Control. She inspected orphanages and reformatories throughout the state, and lectured on her work, before she resigned in 1923, when her salary was cut in the state's budget. In 1928 she was back in the Pacific Northwest, as an officer of the Washington Society for Mental Hygiene.

== Personal life ==
In 1907, Maybelle M. Park traveled in Europe with a friend, Miss Kober. Park was living in Seattle in June 1941, when she traveled to Wisconsin to be honored at a luncheon and presented with a "golden jubilee" certificate, marking fifty years since her graduation from the University of Wisconsin. She died in 1946, aged 75 years; her gravesite is with her parents', in Waukesha County.
