= Deanville, West Virginia =

Unincorporated community in West Virginia, United States

Deanville
- Unincorporated community
- Location within the state of West Virginia Deanville (the United States)
- Coordinates: 38°59′23″N 80°12′23″W
- Country: United States
- State: West Virginia
- County: Upshur
- Elevation: 1,444 ft (440 m)
- Time zone: UTC-5 (Eastern (EST))
  - Summer (DST): UTC-4 (EDT)
- GNIS ID: 1554275

Deanville is an unincorporated community in Upshur County, West Virginia, United States.
