= Lerona, West Virginia =

- Unincorporated community
- Location within the state of West Virginia Lerona, West Virginia (the United States)
- Coordinates: 37°29′58″N 80°58′44″W
- Country: United States
- State: West Virginia
- County: Mercer
- Elevation: 2,533 ft (772 m)
- Time zone: UTC-5 (Eastern (EST))
  - Summer (DST): UTC-4 (EDT)
- ZIP code: 25971
- Area codes: 304 & 681
- GNIS feature ID: 1554943

Lerona is an unincorporated community in Mercer County, West Virginia, United States. Lerona is located on West Virginia Route 20, 5.5 miles (8.9 km) north-northeast of Athens. Lerona has a post office with ZIP code 25971.
