= Cutright Run =

Stream in West Virginia, U.S.

Coordinates: 38°57′04″N 80°13′52″W

Cutright Run is a stream in the U.S. state of West Virginia.

Cutright Run was named after John Cutright, an early settler.

== See also ==
- List of rivers of West Virginia
