= Teterville, Kansas =

Ghost town in Greenwood County, Kansas

- Ghost town
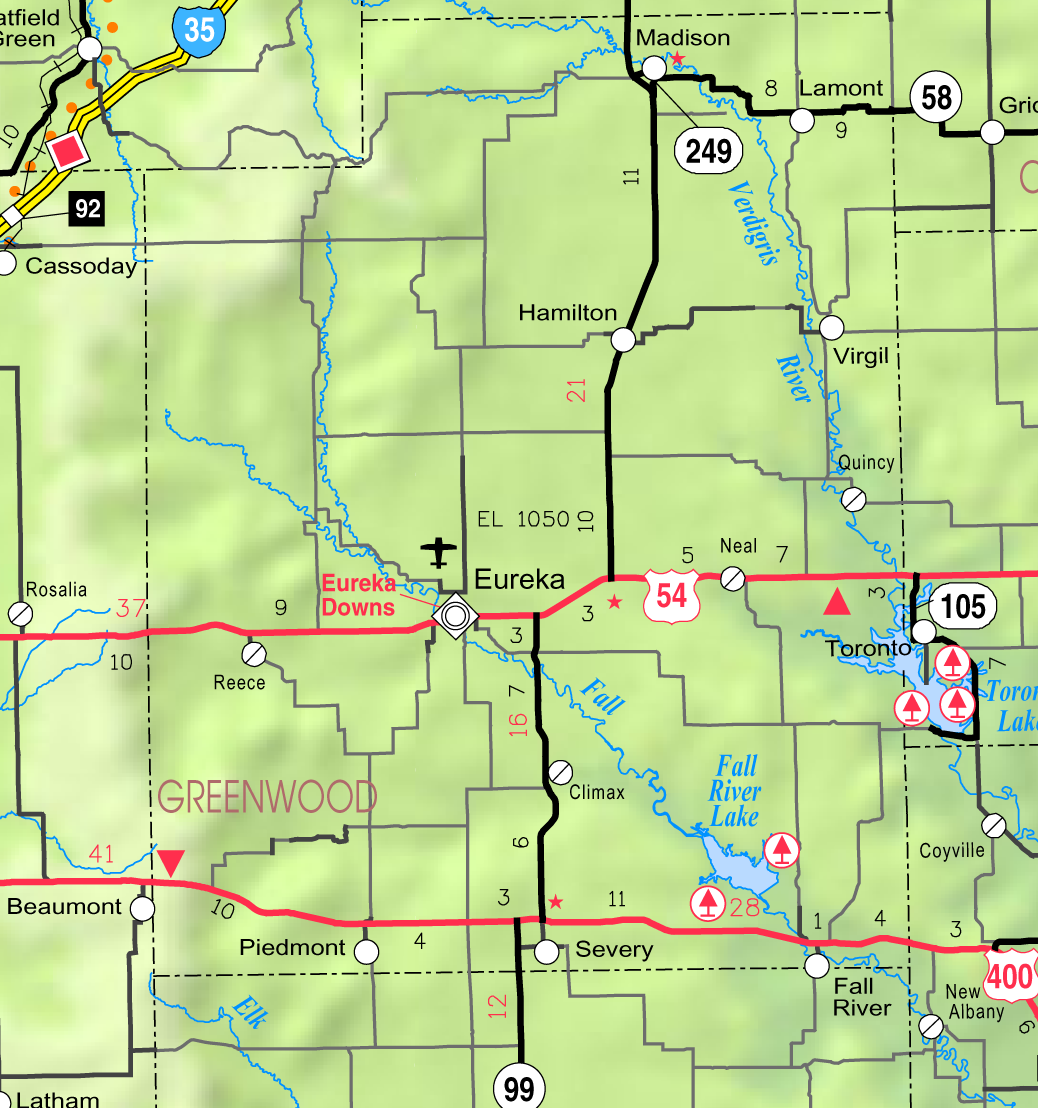
- KDOT map of Greenwood County (legend)

- Location within Kansas Location within the United States
- Coordinates: 38°2′35″N 96°25′14″W
- Country: United States
- State: Kansas
- County: Greenwood
- Elevation: 1,608 ft (490 m)

Population
  - Total: 0
- Time zone: UTC-6 (CST)
  - Summer (DST): UTC-5 (CDT)
- Area code: 620
- FIPS code: 20-70275
- GNIS ID: 484837

Teterville is a ghost town in Greenwood County, Kansas, United States. It is located approximately 11 miles east of Cassoday. No buildings remain of this former community.

== History ==
Teterville was founded as an "oil town" sometime after the Teeter Oil Field was discovered circa 1920. The oil field was named in honor of James Teter, who owned about 6900 acres of land in Greenwood County. A post office was opened in Teterville in 1927, and remained in operation until being discontinued in 1962.

== Points of interest ==
- Teter Rock. It is located 0.9 miles (1.4 km) south of Teterhill Road on top of a hill at 38°1′46.5″N 96°25′24.9″W (38.029583, -96.423583). It is accessible by the public using a rural road on private land. In 1954, the current monument was erected by the Greenwood County Historical Society to replace the earlier landmark created in the 1870s or 1880s by James Wesley Teter (1849–1929).
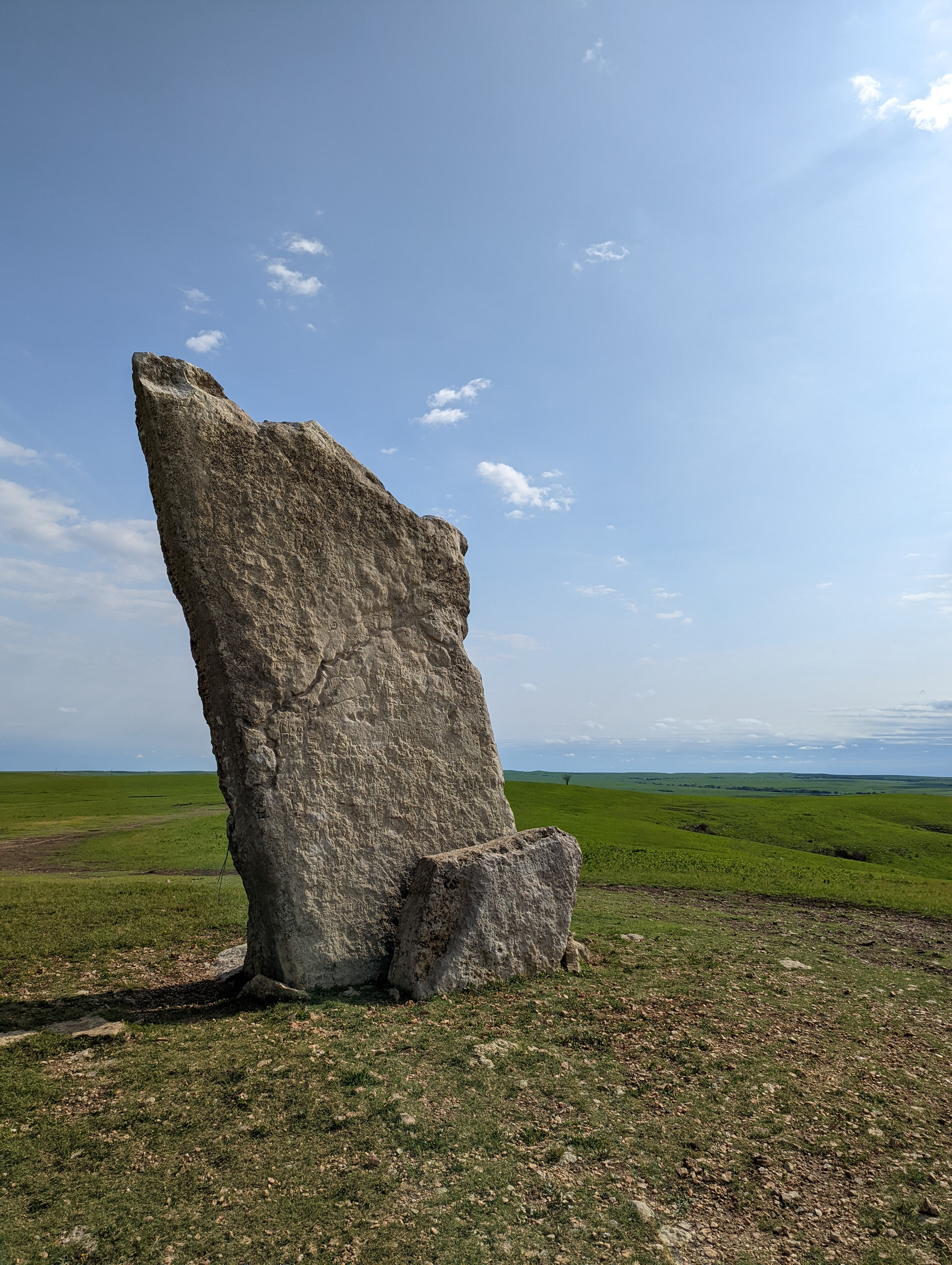
Teter Rock, near the townsite of Teterville, Greenwood County, Kansas, USA

== See also ==
- Salem Township, Greenwood County, Kansas (location of Teterville)
- Teter, West Virginia (founded by relatives of James Teter)
