= Hampton, West Virginia =

Hampton
- Unincorporated community
- Location within the state of West Virginia Hampton (the United States)
- Coordinates: 38°56′17″N 80°14′23″W
- Country: United States
- State: West Virginia
- County: Upshur
- Elevation: 1,457 ft (444 m)
- Time zone: UTC-5 (Eastern (EST))
  - Summer (DST): UTC-4 (EDT)
- GNIS ID: 1554634

Hampton is an unincorporated community in Upshur County, West Virginia, United States.

A variant name was Ivanhoe; the present name is in honor of Hampton Fisher. A post office called Ivanhoe was established in 1891, and remained in operation until 1976.
