= Daysville, West Virginia =

Unincorporated community in West Virginia, United States

Daysville
- Unincorporated community
- Location within the state of West Virginia Daysville (the United States)
- Coordinates: 38°57′38″N 80°9′39″W
- Country: United States
- State: West Virginia
- County: Upshur
- Elevation: 1,604 ft (489 m)
- Time zone: UTC-5 (Eastern (EST))
  - Summer (DST): UTC-4 (EDT)
- GNIS ID: 1554270

Daysville is an unincorporated community in Upshur County, West Virginia, United States.
