= Lerona, California =

Unincorporated community in California, United States

Lerona
- Unincorporated community
- Location in California Lerona (the United States)
- Coordinates: 37°07′46″N 119°25′52″W
- Country: United States
- State: California
- County: Fresno
- Elevation: 2,790 ft (850 m)

Lerona is an unincorporated community that is located in Fresno County, California, United States. It is located 6.5 miles (10 km) west-northwest of Shaver Lake Heights, at an elevation of 2789 feet (850 m).

Lerona was a flag stop and station on the San Joaquin & Eastern railroad line. The origin of the name is unknown.

The Lerona School District was founded in 1923.
