= Midvale, West Virginia =

Midvale
- Unincorporated community
- Location within the state of West Virginia Midvale (the United States)
- Coordinates: 38°56′14″N 80°5′23″W
- Country: United States
- State: West Virginia
- County: Upshur
- Elevation: 1,847 ft (563 m)
- Time zone: UTC-5 (Eastern (EST))
  - Summer (DST): UTC-4 (EDT)
- GNIS ID: 1555115

Midvale is an unincorporated community in Upshur County, West Virginia, United States.
