= Gormley, West Virginia =

Unincorporated community in West Virginia, United States

Gormley
- Unincorporated community
- Location within the state of West Virginia Gormley (the United States)
- Coordinates: 38°58′20″N 80°5′20″W
- Country: United States
- State: West Virginia
- County: Upshur
- Elevation: 2,110 ft (640 m)
- Time zone: UTC-5 (Eastern (EST))
  - Summer (DST): UTC-4 (EDT)
- GNIS ID: 1554586

Gormley is an unincorporated community in Upshur County, West Virginia, United States.
