= Upshur County Schools =

School district in West Virginia, United States

Upshur County Schools is a school district in Upshur County, West Virginia, United States. The Superintendent is Christine Miller, Assistant Superintendent is Russ Collett, the Board President is Jan Craig, the Board Vice-President is Sherry Dean, and the treasurer is Sarah Wills.

== Schools ==
=== High schools ===
- Buckhannon-Upshur High School
- Fred W. Eberle Technical Center

=== Middle schools ===
- Buckhannon-Upshur Middle School

=== Elementary schools ===
- Buckhannon Academy Elementary School
- French Creek Elementary School
- Hodgesville Elementary School
- Rock Cave Elementary School
- Tennerton Elementary School
- Union Elementary School
- Washington District Elementary School
