= Tygart Valley River =

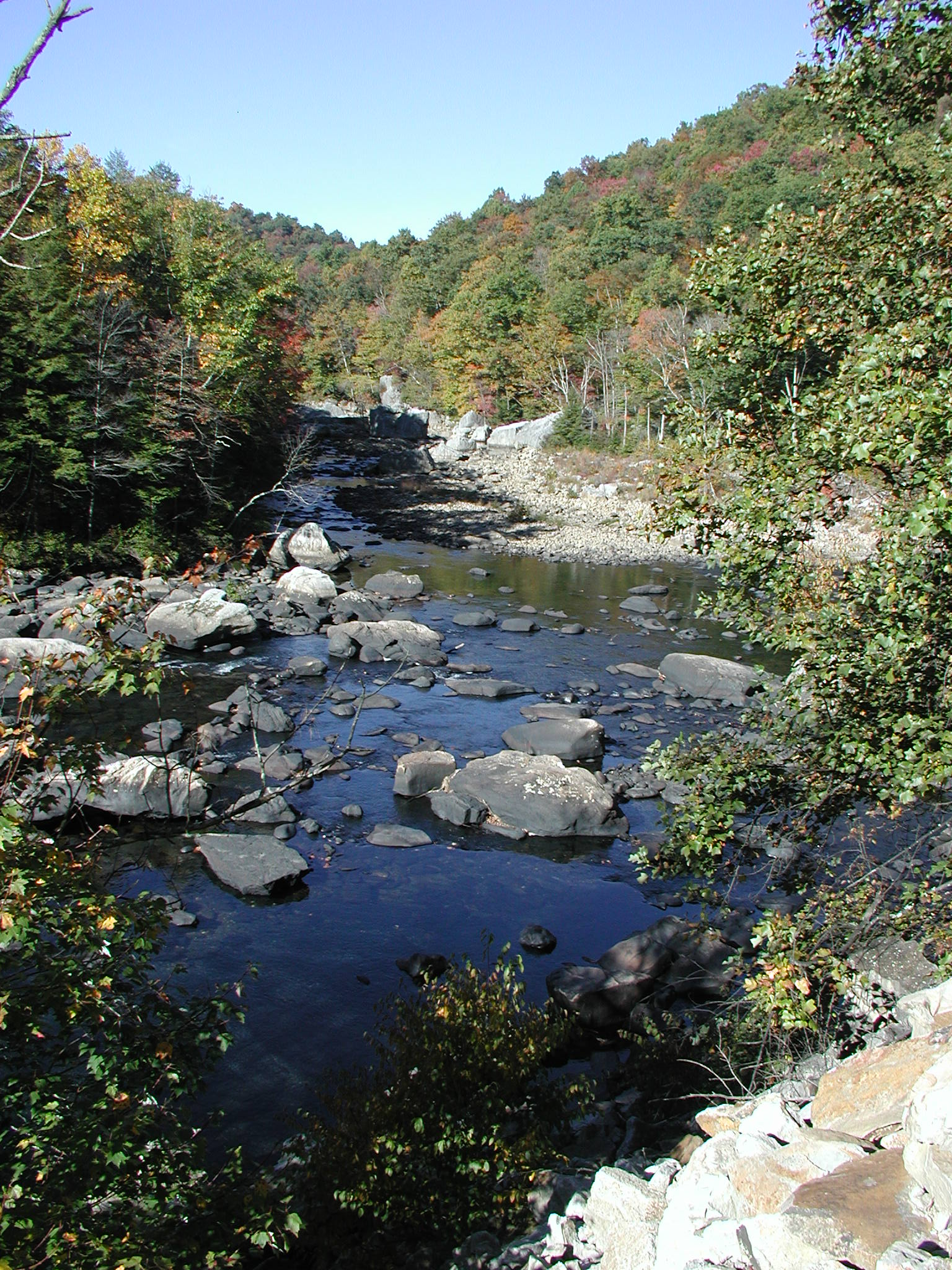
- The Tygart Valley River at the mouth of the Buckhannon River (just above center). Photo taken along the B&O Railroad between Belington and Philippi.

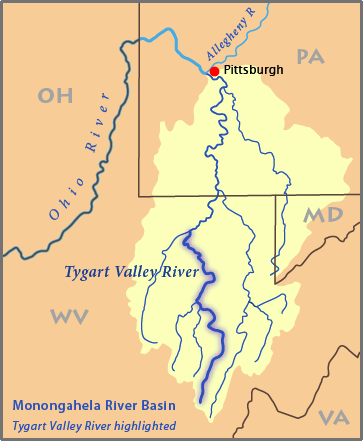
- Map of the Monongahela River basin, with the Tygart Valley River highlighted

Location
- Country: United States
- State: West Virginia
- Counties: Barbour, Marion, Pocahontas, Taylor, Randolph

Physical characteristics
- Source: Allegheny Mountains
  - location: Pocahontas County, WV
  - coordinates: 38°28′06″N 79°58′51″W
  - elevation: 4,540 ft (1,380 m)
- Mouth: Monongahela River
  - location: Fairmont, WV
  - coordinates: 39°27′54″N 80°09′11″W
  - elevation: 863 ft (263 m)
- Length: 135 mi (217 km)
- Basin size: 1,329 mi^{2} (3,440 km^{2})
- Discharge
  - location: mouth
  - average: 2,855.07 cu ft/s (80.847 m^{3}/s) (estimate)

Basin features
- Tributaries
  - left: Middle Fork River, Buckhannon River
  - right: Conley Run, Riffle Creek

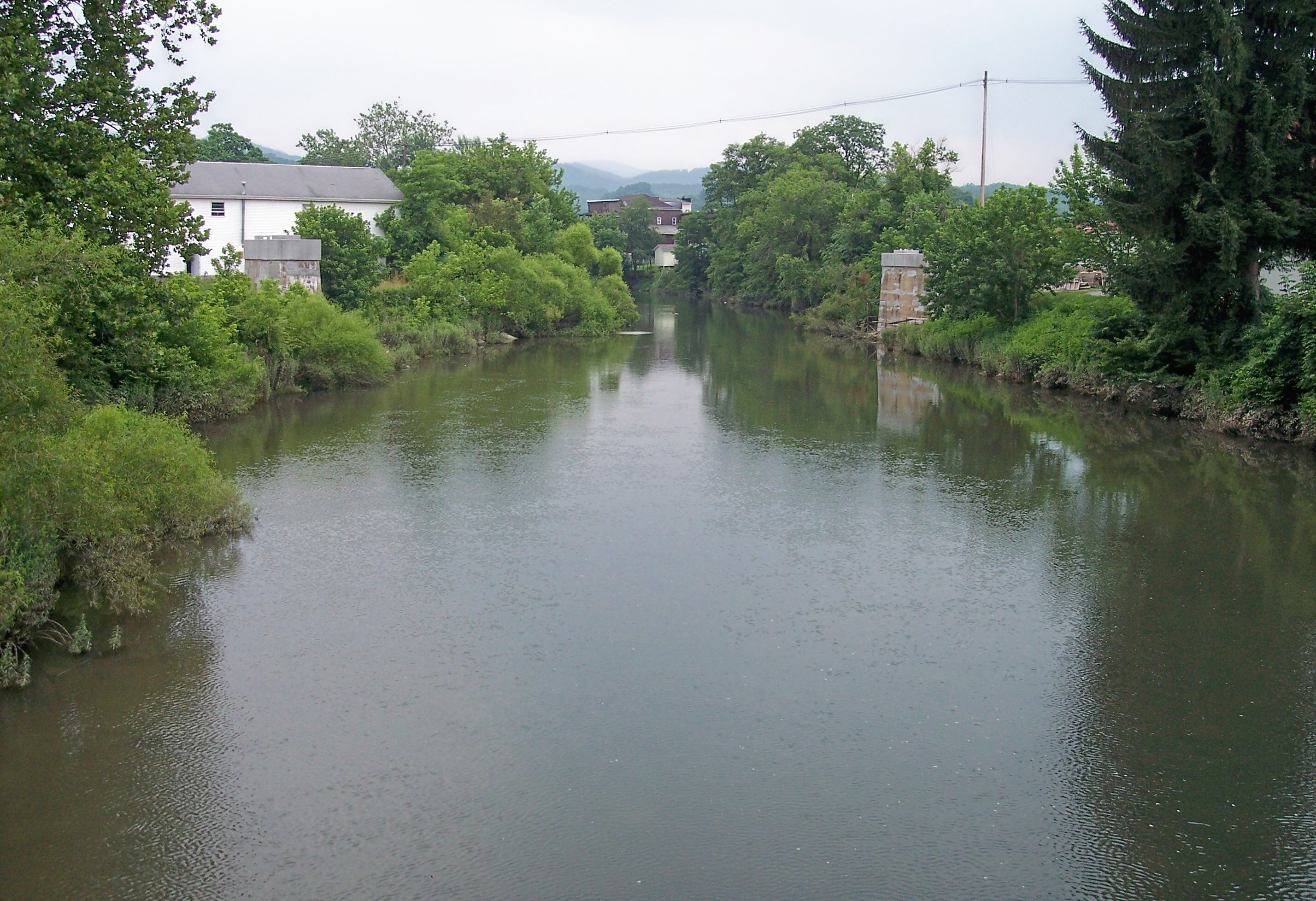
The Tygart Valley River in Elkins in 2006

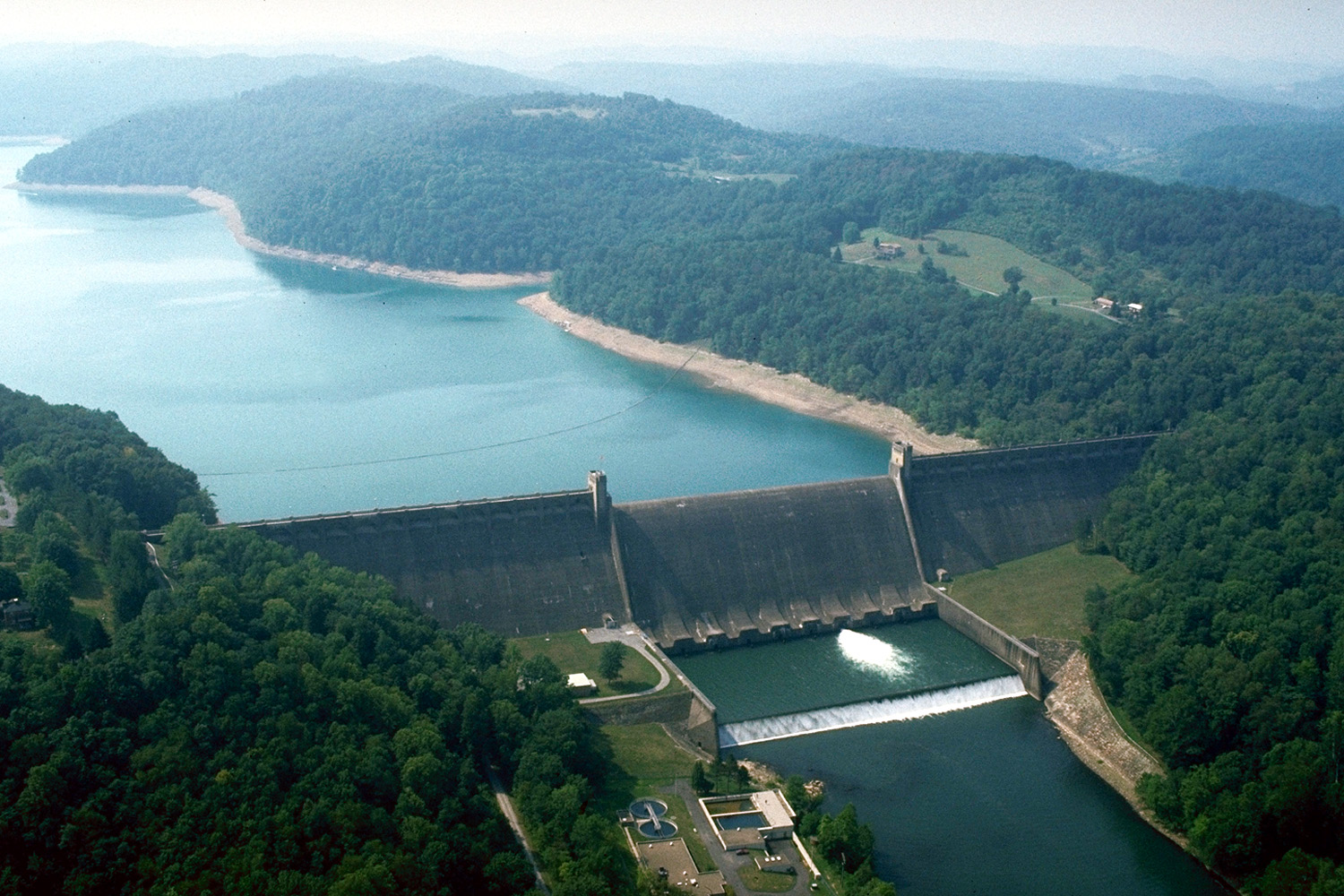
Tygart River Lake and Dam near Grafton, West Virginia. View is upriver to the south.

The Tygart Valley River — also known as the Tygart River — is a principal tributary of the Monongahela River, approximately 135 miles (217 km) long, in east-central West Virginia in the United States. Via the Monongahela and Ohio rivers, it is part of the watershed of the Mississippi River, draining an area of 1,329 square miles (3,440 km^{2}) in the Allegheny Mountains and the unglaciated portion of the Allegheny Plateau.

== Course ==
The Tygart Valley River rises in the Allegheny Mountains in Pocahontas County and flows generally north-northwestwardly through Randolph, Barbour, Taylor and Marion counties, past the towns of Huttonsville, Mill Creek, Beverly, Elkins, Junior, Belington, Philippi, Arden, and Grafton, to Fairmont, where it joins the West Fork River to form the Monongahela River. (The Tygart is thus the "East Fork" of the Monongahela.) Downstream of Elkins, the Tygart passes through a gap between Rich Mountain and Laurel Mountain, which are considered to be part of the westernmost ridge of the Allegheny Mountains and the boundary between the Alleghenies and the Allegheny Plateau.

Along its course the river collects Leading Creek at Elkins; the Middle Fork River and the Buckhannon River (its largest tributary) in Barbour County; and Sandy Creek and Three Fork Creek in Taylor County. Just upstream of Grafton, the river was impounded by a U.S. Army Corps of Engineers dam in 1938 to form Tygart Lake. Valley Falls State Park is along the river between Grafton and Fairmont.

== Discharge ==
At its mouth, the river has an estimated mean annual flow volume of 2,855 cubic feet per second (80.8 m^{3}/s). At the United States Geological Survey's stream gauge in Philippi, the annual mean flow of the river between 1940 and 2005 was 1,922 cubic feet per second (54.4 m^{3}/s). The river's highest flow during the period was estimated at 61,000 cu ft/s (1,700 m^{3}/s) on November 5, 1985. The lowest recorded flow was 4.9 cu ft/s (0.14 m^{3}/s) on several days in October 1953.

At an upstream gauge near the community of Dailey in Randolph County, the annual mean flow of the river between 1915 and 2005 was 358 cu ft/s (10.1 m^{3}/s). The highest recorded flow during the period was 19,900 cu ft/s (560 m^{3}/s) on May 17, 1996. Readings of zero were recorded for several months during the autumns of 1930 and 1953.

== History ==
The Tygart Valley was first settled by Europeans in 1753 when David Tygart (for whom the valley and river are named) and Robert Files (or Foyle) located (separately) with their families in the vicinity of present-day Beverly. Although there had been no recent history of conflicts between whites and Indians in that immediate area, that summer a party of Indians traveling the Shawnee Trail discovered the Files cabin and killed seven members of the family. One son escaped and alerted the Tygart family, allowing all to escape. No other white settlement was attempted in modern Randolph County until 1772. It has been thought that Tygart was again among those settling then, but this is not certain.

The brothers John and Samuel Pringle later associated with the Pringle Tree, who in 1761 had taken up residence along the Buckhannon tributary of the Tygart in modern Upshur County, acted as their contemporary Daniel Boone was doing in Kentucky and guided numerous immigrant settlers into the main valley of the Tygart which at that time abounded in game and fertile bottomlands. Settlers of the 1770s and 1780s included the Connelly, Hadden, Jackson, Nelson, Riffle, Stalnaker, Warwick, Westfall, Whiteman and Wilson families.

One settler, John Jackson [1715–1801] from County Londonderry, Ireland, was great-grandfather to Thomas "Stonewall" Jackson.

Several minor actions occurred in the valley during the American Civil War, including the Battle of Philippi, the Battle of Laurel Hill and the Battle of Cheat Mountain, all in 1861.

== Variant names and spellings ==
The United States Board on Geographic Names settled on "Tygart River" as the stream's name in 1902, and changed it to "Tygart Valley River" in 1950. According to the Geographic Names Information System, the Tygart Valley River has also been known historically as:

- Muddy River
- Tagret Valley River
- Tigar Valley Fork
- Tigar Valley River
- Tigarts Valley River
- Tigers Valley River
- Tigert Valley River
- Tigris Valley River
- Tygars Valley
- Tygars Valley River
- Tygart River
- Tygart's River
- Tygart's Valley River
- Tygarts Valley River
- Tygarts-Valley River
- Tyger Valley Fork
- Tyger Valley River
- Tygers Valley
- Tygers Valley River
- Tygerts River
- Tygerts Valley River
- Tygharts Valley River
- Valley River

== See also ==
- List of rivers of West Virginia
