= Upshur County, West Virginia =

County in West Virginia, United States

- County
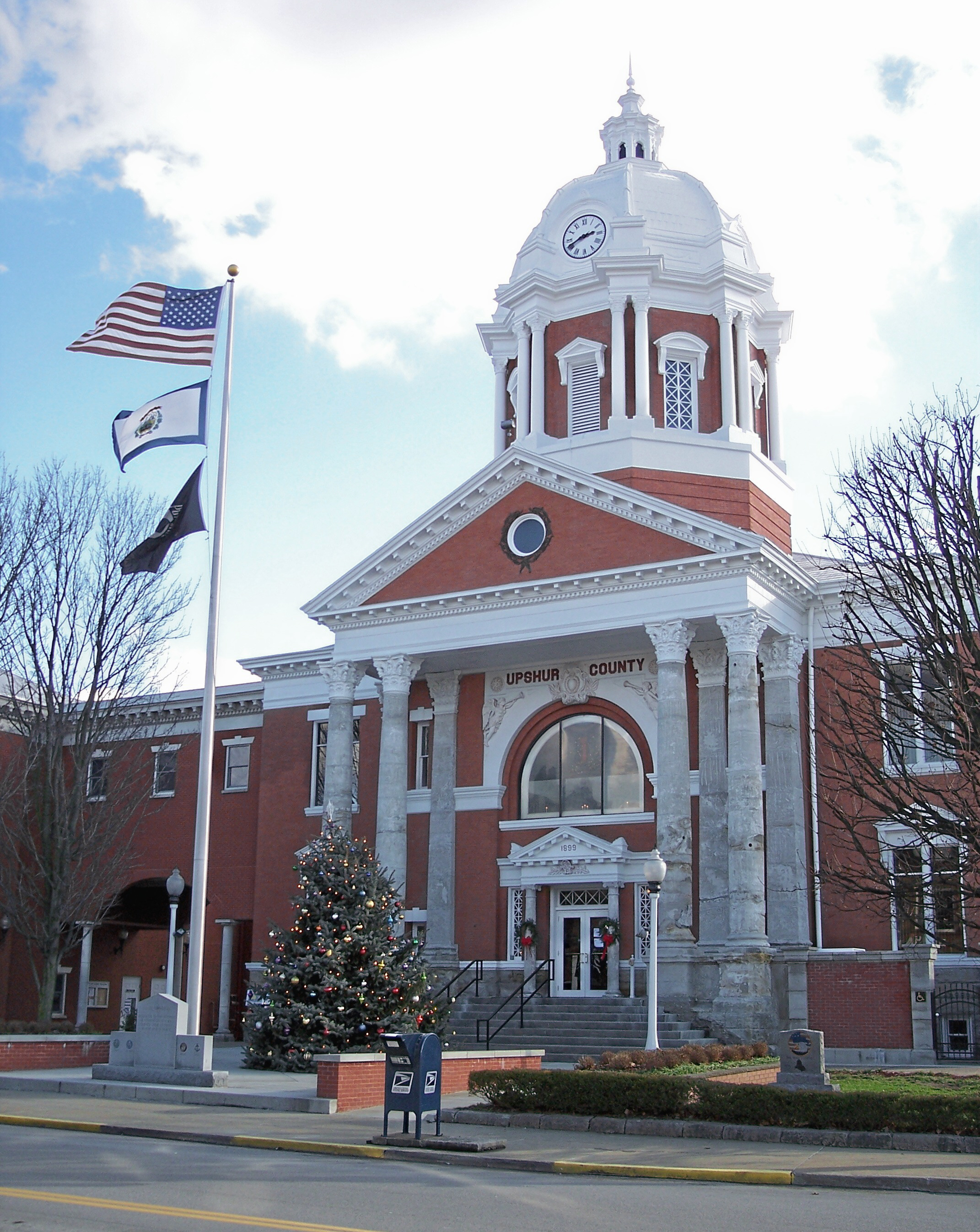
- The Upshur County Courthouse, designed by architect Harrison Albright pictured in Buckhannon in 2006

- Seal

- Location within the U.S. state of West Virginia
- Coordinates: 38°54′N 80°14′W
- Country: United States
- State: West Virginia
- Founded: March 26, 1851
- Named for: Abel Parker Upshur
- Seat: Buckhannon
- Largest city: Buckhannon

Area
  - Total: 355 sq mi (920 km^{2})
  - Land: 355 sq mi (920 km^{2})
  - Water: 0.1 sq mi (0.26 km^{2}) 0.03%

Population (2020)
  - Total: 23,816
  - Estimate (2025): 23,758 ▼
  - Density: 67.1/sq mi (25.9/km^{2})
- Time zone: UTC−5 (Eastern)
  - Summer (DST): UTC−4 (EDT)
- Congressional district: 2nd
- Website: www.upshurcounty.org

Upshur County is a county in the U.S. state of West Virginia. As of the 2020 census, the population was 23,816. Its county seat is Buckhannon. The county was formed in 1851 from Randolph, Barbour, and Lewis counties and named for Abel Parker Upshur, a distinguished statesman and jurist of Virginia. Upshur served as United States Secretary of State and Secretary of the Navy under President John Tyler.

== Geography ==
According to the United States Census Bureau, the county has a total area of 355 square miles (920 km^{2}), of which 354.9 square miles (919 km^{2}) is land and 0.1 square miles (0.26 km^{2}) (0.03%) is water. The county falls within the United States National Radio Quiet Zone. The highest elevation in Upshur County is 3,160 feet or 963 meters, near Sugar Run on the Randolph and Upshur County lines just outside Palace Valley and Hemlock. It is reported there as an elevation marker at the site.

In 1863, West Virginia's counties were divided into civil townships, with the intention of encouraging local government. This proved impractical in the heavily rural state, and in 1872 the townships were converted into magisterial districts. Upshur County was divided into six districts: Banks, Buckhannon, Meade, Union, Warren, and Washington. In the 1990s, the six historic magisterial districts were consolidated into three new districts: First, Second, and Third.

=== Major highways ===
- U.S. Highway 33
- U.S. Highway 48
- U.S. Highway 119
- West Virginia Route 4
- West Virginia Route 20

=== Adjacent counties ===
- Harrison County (north)
- Barbour County (northeast)
- Randolph County (southeast)
- Webster County (south)
- Lewis County (west)

== Demographics ==
Historical population
Census	Pop.	Note	%±
1860	7,292		—
1870	8,023		10.0%
1880	10,249		27.7%
1890	12,714		24.1%
1900	14,696		15.6%
1910	16,629		13.2%
1920	17,851		7.3%
1930	17,944		0.5%
1940	18,360		2.3%
1950	19,242		4.8%
1960	18,292		−4.9%
1970	19,092		4.4%
1980	23,427		22.7%
1990	22,867		−2.4%
2000	23,404		2.3%
2010	24,254		3.6%
2020	23,816		−1.8%
2025 (est.)	23,758	▼	−0.2%
U.S. Decennial Census; 1790–1960 1900–1990; 1990–2000 2010–2020

=== 2020 census ===
As of the 2020 census, the county had a population of 23,816. Of the residents, 20.9% were under the age of 18 and 21.0% were 65 years of age or older; the median age was 41.9 years. For every 100 females there were 96.4 males, and for every 100 females age 18 and over there were 95.9 males.

The racial makeup of the county was 94.4% White, 0.9% Black or African American, 0.2% American Indian and Alaska Native, 0.4% Asian, 0.4% from some other race, and 3.8% from two or more races. Hispanic or Latino residents of any race comprised 1.3% of the population.

There were 9,598 households in the county, of which 27.6% had children under the age of 18 living with them and 25.0% had a female householder with no spouse or partner present. About 28.4% of all households were made up of individuals and 13.9% had someone living alone who was 65 years of age or older.

There were 11,178 housing units, of which 14.1% were vacant. Among occupied housing units, 73.8% were owner-occupied and 26.2% were renter-occupied. The homeowner vacancy rate was 1.8% and the rental vacancy rate was 11.3%.

Upshur County, West Virginia – Racial and ethnic composition Note: the US Census treats Hispanic/Latino as an ethnic category. This table excludes Latinos from the racial categories and assigns them to a separate category. Hispanics/Latinos may be of any race.
Race / Ethnicity (NH = Non-Hispanic)	Pop 2000	Pop 2010	Pop 2020	% 2000	% 2010	% 2020
White alone (NH)	22,876	23,494	22,349	97.74%	96.87%	93.84%
Black or African American alone (NH)	143	145	211	0.61%	0.60%	0.89%
Native American or Alaska Native alone (NH)	37	51	37	0.16%	0.21%	0.16%
Asian alone (NH)	71	85	87	0.30%	0.35%	0.37%
Pacific Islander alone (NH)	1	1	5	0.00%	0.00%	0.02%
Other race alone (NH)	8	7	28	0.03%	0.03%	0.12%
Mixed race or Multiracial (NH)	131	221	783	0.56%	0.91%	3.29%
Hispanic or Latino (any race)	137	250	316	0.59%	1.03%	1.33%
Total	23,404	24,254	23,816	100.00%	100.00%	100.00%

=== 2010 census ===
As of the 2010 United States census, there were 24,254 people, 9,619 households, and 6,528 families living in the county. The population density was 68.4 inhabitants per square mile (26.4/km^{2}). There were 11,099 housing units at an average density of 31.3 units per square mile (12.1 units/km^{2}). The racial makeup of the county was 97.6% white, 0.7% black or African American, 0.4% Asian, 0.2% American Indian, 0.2% from other races, and 1.0% from two or more races. Those of Hispanic or Latino origin made up 1.0% of the population. In terms of ancestry, 18.1% were German, 13.8% were American, 10.6% were Irish, and 8.6% were English.

Of the 9,619 households, 28.7% had children under the age of 18 living with them, 54.0% were married couples living together, 9.6% had a female householder with no husband present, 32.1% were non-families, and 26.9% of all households were made up of individuals. The average household size was 2.40 and the average family size was 2.88. The median age was 40.9 years.

The median income for a household in the county was $36,114 and the median income for a family was $44,937. Males had a median income of $36,517 versus $25,420 for females. The per capita income for the county was $18,823. About 14.1% of families and 19.3% of the population were below the poverty line, including 26.7% of those under age 18 and 14.1% of those age 65 or over.

=== 2000 census ===
As of the census of 2000, there were 24,254 people, 9,619 households, and 6,528 families living in the county. The population density was 68.4 people per square mile (26.4 people/km^{2}). There were 11,099 housing units at an average density of 31.3 units per square mile (12.1 units/km^{2}). The racial makeup of the county was 97.6% White, 0.7% Black or African American, 0.2% Native American, 0.2% Asian, 0.2% from other races, and 1% from two or more races. 1% of the population were Hispanic or Latino of any race.

There were 9,619 households, out of which 28.7% had children under the age of 18 living with them, 54% were married couples living together, 9.6% had a female householder with no husband present, and 32.1% were non-families. 26.9% of all households were made up of individuals, and 12.2% had someone living alone who was 65 years of age or older. The average household size was 2.4 and the average family size was 2.88.

In the county, the population was spread out, with 24.7% from age 0 to 19, 7.60% from 20 to 24, 22.6% from 25 to 44, 28.3% from 45 to 64, and 16.6% who were 65 years of age or older. The median age was 41 years. For every 100 females there were 97 males.

The median income for a household in the county was $39,381, whereas the median income for families was 44,937 . Males had a median income of $36,517 versus $25,420 for females. The per capita income for the county was $19,498. About 14.1% of families and 19.3% of the population were below the poverty line, including 26.7% of those under age 18 and 14.1% of those age 65 or over.

== Communities ==
=== City ===
- Buckhannon (county seat)

=== Magisterial districts ===
==== Current ====
- First
- Second
- Third

==== Historic ====
Upshur County was divided into six townships on July 31, 1863. They were replaced in the 1990s.

- Banks District, named for Nathaniel Prentiss Banks
- Buckhannon District, named for the county seat, the City of Buckhannon
- Meade District, named for General George Gordon Meade
- Union District, named for military soldiers serving the Union cause
- Warren District, named for Gouverneur Kemble Warren
- Washington District, named for President George Washington

=== Census-designated places ===
- Adrian
- Hinkleville
- Rock Cave

=== Unincorporated communities ===
- Abbott
- Alexander
- Alton
- Arlington
- Beans Mill
- Canaan
- Carter
- Craddock
- Daysville
- Deanville
- Eden
- Ellamore
- Evergreen
- Excelsior
- Five Forks
- Freeman
- French Creek
- Frenchton
- Gaines
- Gale
- Goodwin
- Gormley
- Goshen
- Gould
- Hampton
- Heavener Grove
- Hemlock
- Hodgesville
- Holly Grove
- Hoover Town
- Imperial
- Ivy
- Kanawha Head
- Kedron
- Kesling Mill
- Lorentz
- McCuetown
- Midvale
- Nebo
- Newlonton
- Overhill
- Palace Valley
- Post Mill
- Queens
- Red Rock
- Reger
- Rocky Ford
- Ruraldale
- Sago
- Sand Run
- Selbyville
- Shahan
- South Buckhannon
- Swamp Run
- Tallmansville
- Tenmile
- Tennerton
- Teter
- Vegan
- White Oak
- Wilsontown
- Yokum
- Zion

== Politics ==
Whereas most of West Virginia has seen a rapid and continuing shift to the Republican Party since the 1990s, Upshur County – though strongly Democratic during the Second Party System – has ever since statehood been a Republican stronghold due to its powerful Unionist sympathies from Civil War days, and the association of the Democratic Party with the “Slave Power” and creating a war the yeoman residents had no desire to fight. The solitary post-Civil War Democrat to win the county has been Lyndon Johnson in 1964, and he won by only 168 votes. Since 1864, only two other Democrats – Jimmy Carter in 1976 and Bill Clinton in 1996 – have topped forty percent in the county.

United States presidential election results for Upshur County, West Virginia
Year	Republican		Democratic		Third party(ies)	
Year	No.	%	No.	%	No.	%
1912	835	23.88%	895	25.59%	1,767	50.53%
1916	2,553	70.14%	1,019	27.99%	68	1.87%
1920	4,936	77.17%	1,418	22.17%	42	0.66%
1924	4,930	70.24%	1,952	27.81%	137	1.95%
1928	5,277	75.20%	1,683	23.98%	57	0.81%
1932	5,077	61.23%	3,147	37.95%	68	0.82%
1936	5,745	64.30%	3,163	35.40%	26	0.29%
1940	6,086	68.02%	2,862	31.98%	0	0.00%
1944	5,332	72.47%	2,026	27.53%	0	0.00%
1948	5,068	68.31%	2,323	31.31%	28	0.38%
1952	5,938	72.66%	2,234	27.34%	0	0.00%
1956	5,707	73.28%	2,081	26.72%	0	0.00%
1960	5,123	66.42%	2,590	33.58%	0	0.00%
1964	3,606	48.86%	3,774	51.14%	0	0.00%
1968	4,565	62.44%	2,319	31.72%	427	5.84%
1972	6,449	78.23%	1,795	21.77%	0	0.00%
1976	4,789	57.68%	3,513	42.32%	0	0.00%
1980	4,751	58.66%	2,867	35.40%	481	5.94%
1984	5,951	70.29%	2,468	29.15%	47	0.56%
1988	4,813	60.97%	3,065	38.83%	16	0.20%
1992	3,505	42.47%	3,161	38.30%	1,587	19.23%
1996	3,325	44.65%	3,052	40.98%	1,070	14.37%
2000	5,165	63.58%	2,770	34.10%	188	2.31%
2004	6,191	66.62%	3,034	32.65%	68	0.73%
2008	5,911	65.89%	2,925	32.61%	135	1.50%
2012	5,939	71.57%	2,158	26.01%	201	2.42%
2016	7,005	75.34%	1,766	18.99%	527	5.67%
2020	7,771	76.01%	2,256	22.07%	196	1.92%
2024	7,633	77.42%	2,033	20.62%	193	1.96%

== Economy ==
Economy includes coal mining and timber, as well as higher education—the Upshur County seat of Buckhannon is home to the small, private, liberal arts institution West Virginia Wesleyan College. The West Virginia State Wildlife Center in French Creek also generates some income as a popular tourist attraction. Upshur County also gained international attention during the Sago Mine disaster in 2006; the blast and ensuing aftermath trapped 13 coal miners for nearly two days, only one of whom survived.

== See also ==
- Upshur County Schools
- National Register of Historic Places listings in Upshur County, West Virginia
- Sago Mine disaster
- West Virginia Wesleyan College
- West Virginia State Wildlife Center
