= Buckhannon River =

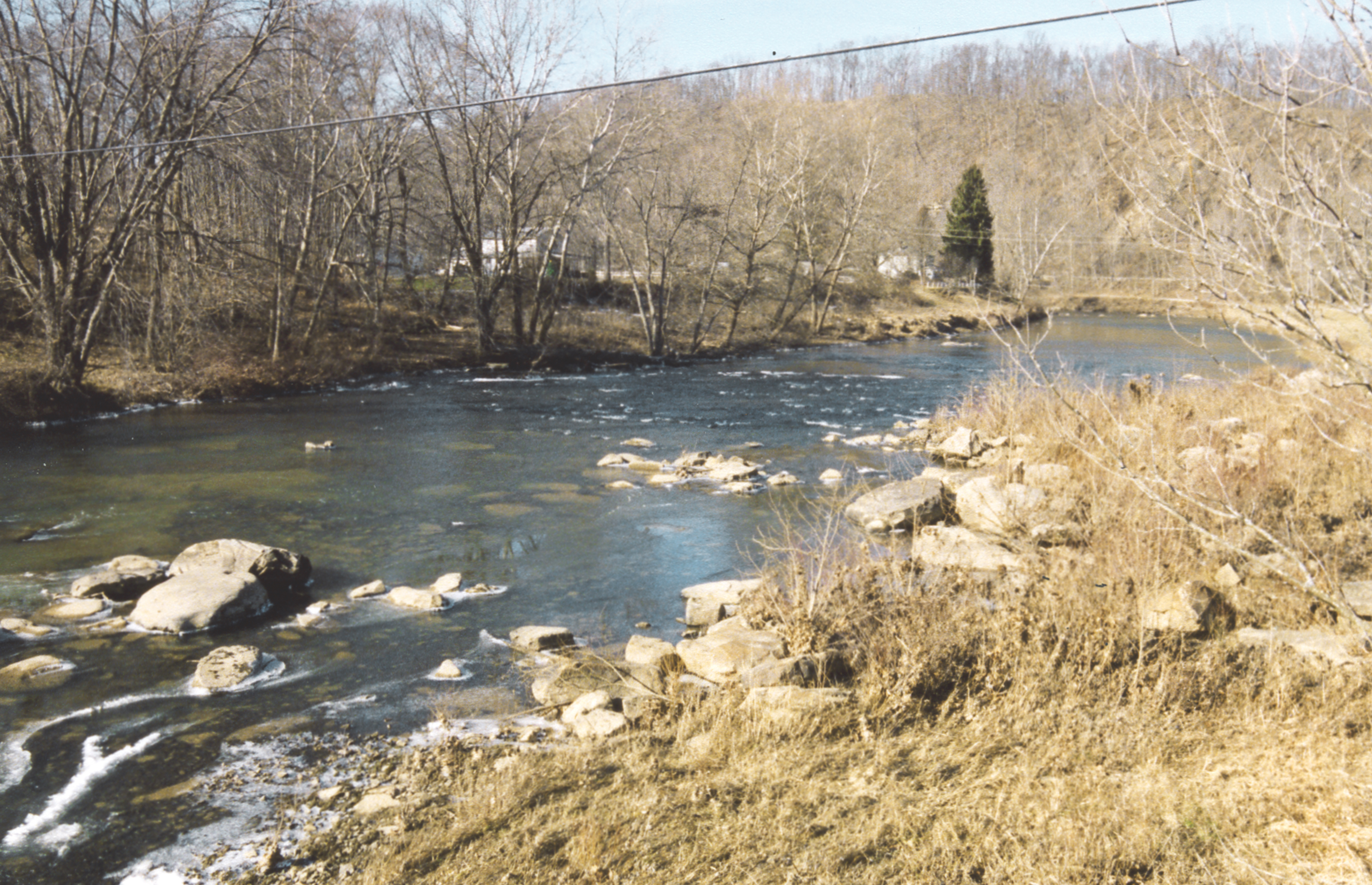
- The Buckhannon River in Rangoon in 2005

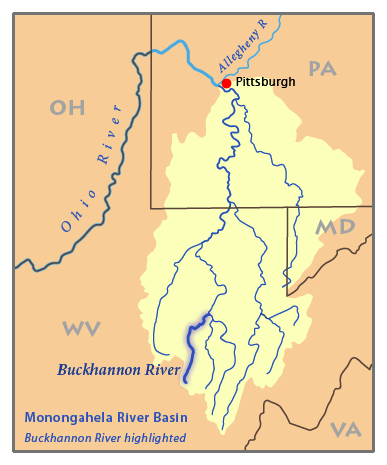
- Map of the Monongahela River basin, highlighting the Buckhannon River

Location
- Country: United States
- State: West Virginia
- Counties: Upshur, Barbour

Physical characteristics
- Source: Confluence of Left Fork Buckhannon River and Right Fork Buckhannon River
  - location: Alexander, Upshur County
  - coordinates: 38°47′03″N 80°13′20″W
  - elevation: 1,837 ft (560 m)
- Mouth: Tygart Valley River
  - location: southwestern Barbour County
  - coordinates: 39°05′49″N 80°04′35″W
  - elevation: 1,325 ft (404 m)
- Length: 45 mi (72 km)
- Basin size: 309 sq mi (800 km^{2})

Basin features
- Tributaries
  - left: Cutright Run

The Buckhannon River is a 45.4-mile-long (73.1 km) tributary of the Tygart Valley River in north-central West Virginia, United States. Via the Tygart Valley, Monongahela and Ohio rivers, it is part of the watershed of the Mississippi River, draining an area of 309 square miles (800 km^{2}) on the unglaciated portion of the Allegheny Plateau. It provides drinking water for much of Upshur County.

== Geography ==
The Buckhannon River is formed at the community of Alexander in southern Upshur County by the confluence of the Left Fork Buckhannon River and the Right Fork Buckhannon River, both of which rise in southwestern Randolph County at elevations of 3,658 feet (1,115 m) and 3,401 feet (1,037 m), respectively, and flow generally north-northwestwardly into southern Upshur County. The Right Fork flows through the communities of Pickens and Selbyville and collects tributaries known as the Middle Fork Right Fork Buckhannon River and the Left Fork Right Fork Buckhannon River; the Left Fork of the Right Fork flows through the community of Helvetia.

From Alexander the Buckhannon River flows generally northwardly, past Sago, to the city of Buckhannon, then northeastwardly into southwestern Barbour County, past Boulder (Rangoon Post Office) and Carrollton, where it is crossed by the Carrollton Covered Bridge. It joins the Tygart Valley River just downstream of Carrollton, about 4 miles (6 km) southwest of Philippi, at the site of the former community of Tygart Junction.

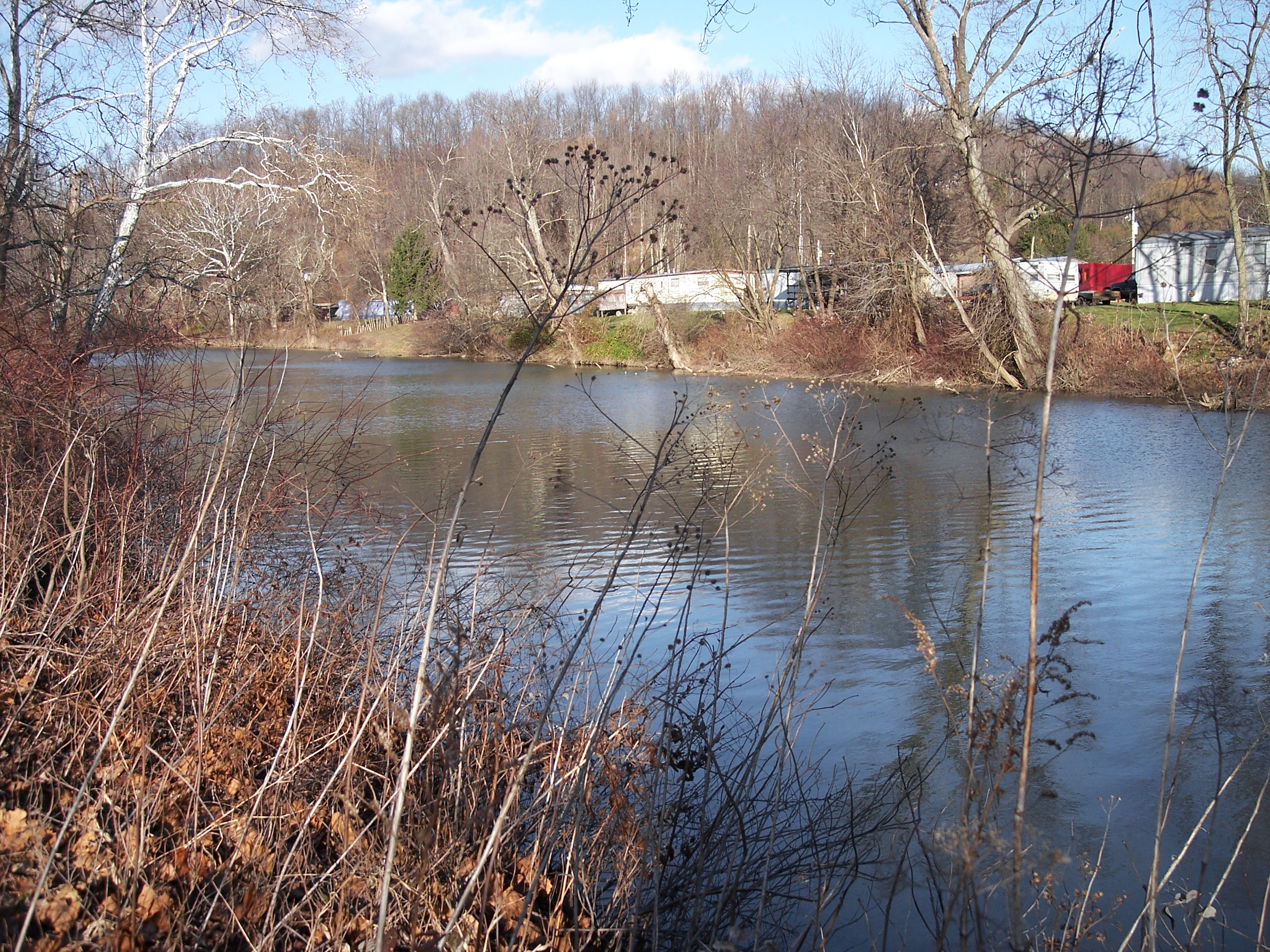
The Buckhannon River in Buckhannon in 2006

According to the West Virginia Department of Environmental Protection, approximately 79.5% of the Buckhannon River's watershed is forested, mostly deciduous; approximately 18.1% is used for agriculture and pasture; and less than 1% is urban.

== Name ==
The city of Buckhannon was officially named for Buckongahelas (c. 1720–1805), the legendary Lenape Chief. A statue of Buckongahelas and his fallen son, crafted by Buckhannon sculptor Ross Straight, was erected in Buckhannon West Virginia’s Jawbone Park in 2000.

== Fish life ==
The uppermost (southernmost) stretch of the river downstream of Alexander drops approximately 400 feet (120 m) in its first 13 miles (21 km) and is boulder-strewn, providing habitat for trout (particularly brown trout), smallmouth bass, and rock bass. A low dam, installed for the provision of drinking water, forms a pool stretching upstream of Buckhannon to Sago; downstream of Sago, the Buckhannon is considered to be one of the best streams for muskellunge fishing in West Virginia. For 20 miles (32 km) downstream of Buckhannon, the river generally moves slowly between vegetation-covered banks over numerous submerged logs, providing habitat for muskies as well as smallmouth bass, rock bass, and carp. In its lowermost course above its mouth, the river assumes a higher gradient and is home to smallmouth bass, rock bass, and sunfish.

== Variant names and spellings ==
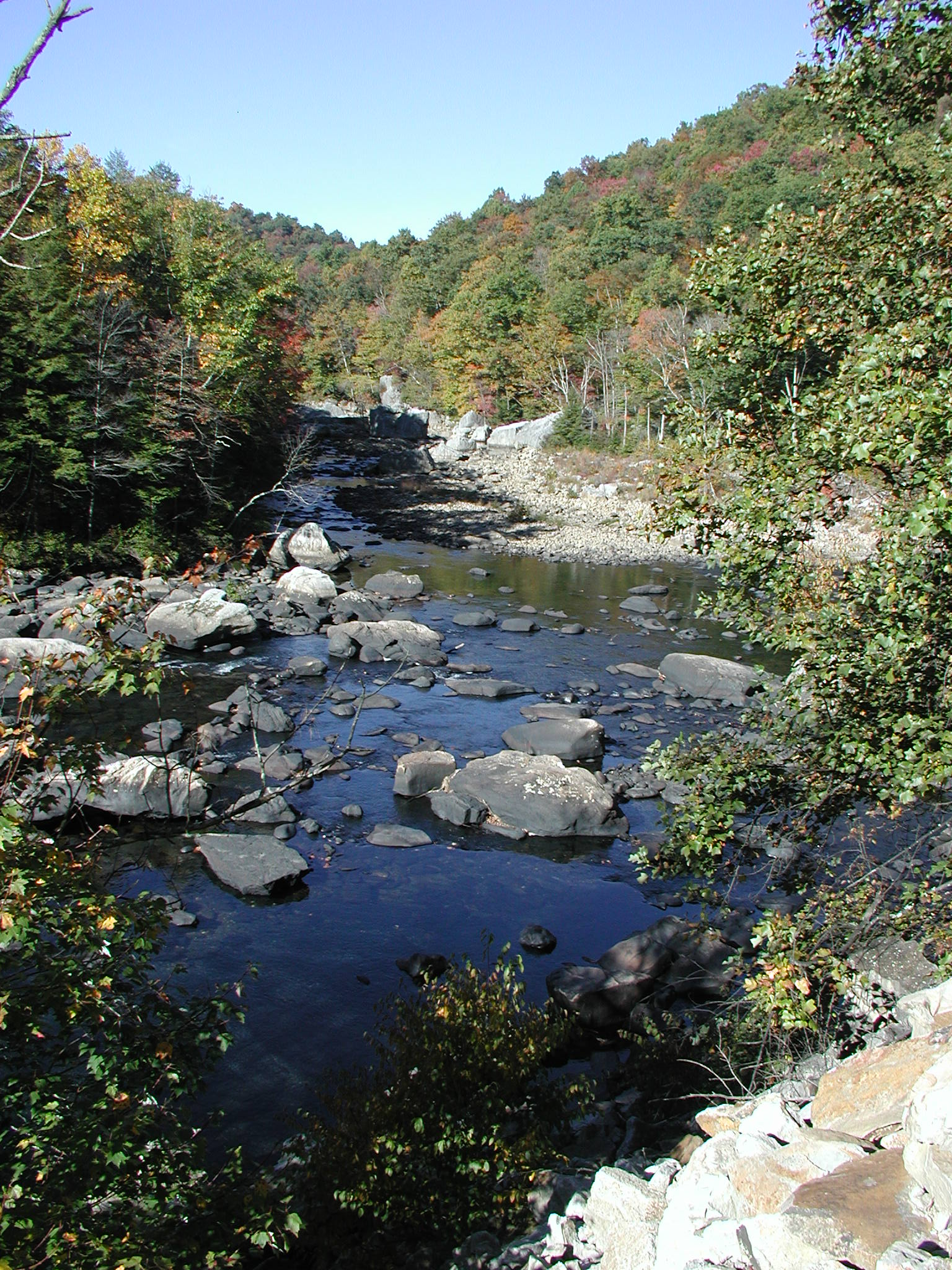
Mouth of the Buckhannon River (just above center) as it discharges into the Tygart Valley River. Photo taken along the B&O Railroad between Belington and Philippi

According to the Geographic Names Information System & official historic markers, the Buckhannon River has also been known as:

- Buckongehanon River
- Buckanan River
- Buckhanan River
- Buckhannans Fork
- Buckhanon River

== See also ==
- List of West Virginia rivers
