= Area codes 304 and 681 =

Telephone area codes of West Virginia

Coordinates: 38.479395°N 81.013184°W

West Virginia's area codes (red area)

Area codes 304 and 681 are telephone area codes in the North American Numbering Plan (NANP) for the entirety of the U.S. state of West Virginia. The numbering plan area was established in October 1947 with area code 304, as one of the 86 original North American area codes. Area code 681 was added to the same area as an overlay in 2009.

== History ==
Due to West Virginia's low population, the state still needed only one area code in the early 21st century. With the growth of telecommunication services, in particular proliferation of cell and mobile phones and fax machines, news reports in 2007 indicated that West Virginia would soon need a new area code.

On January 29, 2008, the West Virginia Public Service Commission voted to split numbering plan area 304, while commission chairman dissented in favor of an overlay. The proposed split had Charleston, Parkersburg and points south (Huntington, Bluefield, Beckley) staying with area code 304, while the northern and eastern portions of the state (Wheeling, Morgantown, Martinsburg, Clarksburg) would have received a new area code. Telecommunications service providers were also in favor of an overlay. They wanted to spare their northern West Virginia customers, particularly in rural areas, the burden of having to change telephone numbers, which would have required reprogramming of all cell phones.

Over the following two weeks, numerous state and local government officials and various business interests voiced opposition to a split, in favor of the overlay option, with Governor Joe Manchin supporting the overlay. Several telecommunications providers appealed to the Public Service Commission for an overlay, which was unanimously approved by all three commissioners on February 13, 2008. It was the first example of an entire state previously served by a single code installing an overlay plan.

Area code 932 was once reserved for use as a future area code in West Virginia, but since then central office code 932 was assigned in Charleston. West Virginia's numbering plan is not projected to exhaust in the foreseeable future.

Implementation details of the new area code were announced by the North American Numbering Plan Administrator (NANPA) in Planning Letter 375 of March 2008. Permissive ten-digit local dialing of numbers in the existing 304 area code began no later than July 26, 2008. During this period, local 304 calls could still be dialed with just seven digits. Mandatory ten-digit local dialing of existing 304 numbers took effect on February 28, 2009. New numbers for area code 681 became available on March 28, 2009, one month after the start of mandatory ten-digit dialing.

== Service area and central office codes ==
Cities	Area code 304 prefixes	Area code 681 prefixes
Adrian	924	
Advent	988	
Albright	329, 441, 507, 698	441
Alderson	445	335, 642
Alum Creek	306, 756, 915	655
Anawalt	383, 448	
Ansted	658	218, 496, 775
Apple Grove	576	388
Arbovale	456	206, 776
Arnoldsburg	655	578
Athens	301, 384, 396, 819, 898	771, 786
Auburn	349	966
Augusta	496	816
Baker	434, 897	517
Barboursville	302, 733, 736, 762, 948, 955, 963	410, 476, 687
Beaver	223	
Beckley	207, 222, 223, 228, 237, 250, 251, 252, 253, 254, 255, 256, 362, 461, 573, 575, 578, 673, 683, 712, 731, 770, 860, 890, 894, 923, 929	207, 220, 222, 238, 254, 305, 368, 463, 474, 494, 666
Belington	606, 823	453
Belle	220, 359, 949	322, 505
Belleville	210, 295, 299, 420, 422, 424, 428, 464, 480, 481, 482, 483, 485, 488, 490, 494, 580, 615, 718, 834, 865, 893	
Belmont	305, 665, 973	
Benwood	214, 215, 218, 230, 231, 232, 233, 234, 238, 242, 243, 277, 280, 281, 312, 331, 559, 639, 650, 780, 830, 905, 907, 909, 966, 975	327, 437, 508, 618, 880
Berea	349	966
Berkeley Springs	246, 258, 500, 867, 944	401
Bethany	217, 336, 394, 407, 408, 547, 829	226, 490
Beverly	335, 338, 339	
Birch River	332, 649	269, 337
Blacksville	432, 798	375, 545
Blount	965, 968	686
Bluefield	308, 320, 323, 324, 325, 327, 409, 589, 800, 809, 817, 887, 888, 910, 920, 921, 922, 952, 960, 977	210, 232, 251, 255, 282, 284, 289, 323, 338, 374, 429, 499, 510, 621, 877
Bramwell	248, 827	
Branchland	778	325
Brandywine	249, 607	690
Bridgeport	608, 808, 842, 848, 933	342, 842
Bruceton Mills	379	441
Buckhannon	439, 460, 471, 472, 473, 516, 609, 613, 878	276
Buffalo	430, 458, 570, 814, 937	451
Burlington	289	320
Burnsville	713, 852, 853	316
Cairo	628	447
Caldwell	536	
Cameron	686	312
Capon Bridge	856	448
Cass	572	202, 482
Chapmanville	310, 855	366
Charles Town	724, 725, 728, 885, 930	252, 544, 677
Charleston	205, 206, 220, 304, 330, 340, 341, 342, 343, 344, 345, 346, 347, 348, 351, 352, 353, 356, 357, 359, 380, 382, 388, 389, 391, 395, 400, 410, 414, 415, 419, 421, 435, 437, 444, 450, 513, 533, 539, 541, 542, 543, 545, 546, 549, 550, 552, 553, 556, 558, 560, 561, 590, 610, 719, 720, 741, 744, 746, 747, 769, 776, 807, 833, 836, 837, 859, 881, 925, 926, 932, 935, 941, 949, 951, 954, 957, 982, 984, 988, 989, 993	205, 215, 217, 245, 265, 273, 280, 313, 317, 319, 322, 340, 341, 344, 381, 385, 387, 427, 466, 467, 479, 505, 518, 519, 523, 542, 549, 552, 553, 557, 558, 587, 661, 710, 781, 799, 833, 895, 910, 945, 990
Chester	387, 459, 714, 912	223, 382, 486
Clarksburg	203, 300, 326, 423, 476, 620, 622, 623, 624, 625, 626, 627, 629, 631, 641, 669, 672, 677, 695, 709, 715, 838, 841, 844, 918, 931, 969, 979	253, 345, 395, 405, 455, 456, 477, 600, 610, 622, 667, 810, 896, 949
Clay	587, 978	337, 501
Clendenin	548	230, 324
Cowen	226	288, 365
Coxs Mills	349	966
Crab Orchard	223, 683	394, 539
Craigsville	742	716
Crawford	315	
Daniels	763	
Davis	259, 866	435, 481
Davisville	679	445
Davy	297, 656	729
Delbarton	475	416
Dille	332	337
Dryfork	866	481
Duck	332	
Dunbar	766, 767, 768	
Dunlow	385	224, 546
Dunmore	572	
East Bank	595, 734	221, 502, 595
East Lynn	849	916
Eglon	735	680
Elbert	448, 585, 970	434
Elizabeth	275	236, 470
Elk Garden	446	290
Elkins	614, 621, 630, 635, 636, 637, 642, 704, 801, 940	264, 298, 465, 683
Elkview	965, 968	381, 518
Ellenboro	869	421
Enterprise	566	
Fairmont	333, 363, 365, 366, 367, 368, 502, 534, 566, 612, 657, 694, 816, 987	214, 332, 404, 443, 460, 489, 526, 530, 753, 758, 839
Fairview	449, 503, 798, 879	492, 545, 801
Falling Rock	965, 968	381, 518
Falling Waters	240, 270, 271, 274, 279, 283, 820, 886, 995	242, 261, 353, 398
Farmington	504, 825	440, 525
Fayetteville	574, 663, 900	227, 301
Flat Top	787	292
Flemington	739	
Follansbee	394, 407, 505, 527	354
Folsom	795	
Fort Ashby	298, 303, 738, 999	
Fort Gay	648, 764	
Frankford	497	299, 409
Franklin	321, 358, 668, 802, 902	524
French Creek	315, 924	
Gassaway	364, 803	685
Gauley Bridge	632	516
Genoa	648, 764	224
Gilbert	664	491
Glen Dale	221, 810, 843, 845, 990	512
Glen Daniel	934	459, 503
Glenville	462, 804	241
Gormania	693	412, 531
Grafton	265, 506, 518, 903	309, 330
Grantsville	354, 681	442
Greenville	832	364
Hacker Valley	493	800
Hamlin	824	351
Harman	227	259
Harpers Ferry	535	540, 662
Harrisville	643	408
Hedgesville	754	258, 452, 900
Helvetia	335, 338, 339	
Hernshaw	949	
Hillsboro	653	413
Hinton	309, 466, 660	~~561~~, ~~562~~, ~~563~~, ~~564~~, ~~565~~, 644
Holden	946	
Hundred	775	277
Huntington	208, 241, 302, 360, 361, 399, 412, 416, 417, 429, 453, 486, 521, 522, 523, 525, 526, 528, 529, 537, 540, 544, 563, 617, 633, 634, 638, 654, 690, 691, 696, 697, 710, 730, 733, 736, 751, 762, 781, 840, 908, 939, 942, 948, 955, 962, 963, 972	203, 204, 219, 279, 286, 294, 347, 356, 360, 362, 373, 378, 410, 432, 464, 476, 480, 498, 500, 520, 521, 529, 535, 554, 560, 571, 684, 687, 689, 888
Hurricane	397, 562	233, 770
Iaeger	828, 938, 967	946
Inwood	229, 821	246, 310
Ivydale	286	861
Jolo	828, 967	488
Kanawha Falls	779	216, 485
Kanawha Head	315, 924	
Kenna	988	
Kenova	429, 453, 486, 908	500, 689
Kermit	393	735
Keyser	209, 597, 788, 790, 813	266, 379, 620
Kiahsville	385	
Kingwood	329, 441, 507, 698, 996	350, 461, ~~566~~, ~~567~~, ~~568~~, ~~569~~, ~~570~~
Lerona	396	
Letart	600, 882, 895, 971	515, 675
Levels	492	263
Lewisburg	520, 536, 645, 646, 647, 661, 667, 793, 992	318, 418, 430, 484, 548
Logan	239, 571, 601, 687, 688, 752, 784, 785, 792, 831, 896, 928, 953	278, 307, 357, 392, 407, 438, 457, 471, 472, 514, 527, 536, 538
Lost City	434, 897	517
Lost Creek	805, 884	
Lumberport	584, 783, 806	695
Lyburn	946	
Madison	245, 247, 307, 369, 569	682
Maidsville	328, 708, 879	384
Man	583	352, 506, 788
Mannington	508, 795, 986	257
Marlinton	799	396, 875
Martinsburg	240, 260, 261, 262, 263, 264, 267, 268, 270, 271, 274, 279, 283, 350, 378, 433, 579, 582, 596, 616, 671, 676, 702, 707, 754, 820, 839, 886, 901, 995	242, 247, 248, 252, 260, 261, 283, 353, 389, 398, 446, 513, 534, ~~572~~, 575
Mason	773, 882, 971	268, 346, 515
Matewan	426, 475	308
Matoaka	467, 827	
Maysville	749	419
McMechen	214, 215, 218, 221, 230, 231, 232, 233, 234, 280, 281, 312, 331, 559, 639, 650, 780, 810, 830, 843, 845, 905, 907, 966, 990	327, 437, 508, 512, 880
Meadow Bridge	484	
Meadowbrook	783	
Middlebourne	313, 758	585
Milton	390, 743	281, 390
Mineral Wells	489, 861, 863	297, 314
Montgomery	442, 499, 981	377, 450
Moorefield	530, 538, 703	231, 267, 271
Morgantown	212, 216, 225, 244, 276, 282, 284, 285, 288, 290, 291, 292, 293, 296, 319, 322, 328, 376, 381, 413, 418, 427, 554, 581, 594, 598, 599, 680, 685, 692, 708, 777, 826, 906, 943, 974, 983, 985	209, 212, 285, 304, 331, 333, 349, 376, 384, 668, 867, 999
Moundsville	221, 810, 843, 845, 990	512
Mount Carbon	779	216, 485
Mount Clare	805, 884	
Mount Hope	640, 877	249, 422
Mullens	294, 774	296, 369, 532
New Cumberland	316, 564	223, 486
New Martinsville	398, 447, 451, 455, 510, 815	302
Newburg	509, 892	
Newton	565	
Nitro	201, 204, 721, 722, 727, 729, 755, 759, 769, 776, 945	234, 363, 424, 478, 777
Northfork	585, 827, 862, 970	239
Oak Hill	465, 469	823
Oceana	682	334, 458
Omar	946	
Ona	302, 948, 955, 963	275, 410, 476, 687
Paden City	317, 337	699
Parkersburg	210, 295, 299, 420, 422, 424, 428, 480, 481, 482, 483, 485, 488, 490, 494, 580, 588, 615, 699, 718, 834, 861, 863, 865, 893, 916, 917, 991	200, 229, 287, 295, 297, 314, 315, 326, 359, 361, 391, 393, 417, 468, 473, 507, 509, 528, 537, 541, 551, 556, ~~573~~, ~~574~~, 588, 660, 733, 797
Parsons	478	399
Paw Paw	947	343, 444
Paynesville	297, 828, 967	329, 434
Pennsboro	659, 835	483
Petersburg	257, 851	493, 892
Peterstown	753, 858, 898, 994	425
Philippi	314, 457, 470	380
Piedmont	355	339, 371
Pine Grove	889	403
Pineville	202, 732	250
Poca	204, 755, 759, 769, 776	
Point Pleasant	593, 674, 675, 812, 857	237, 383, 487
Prichard	648, 764	
Princeton	396, 425, 431, 487, 557, 716, 818, 898, 913, 961	300, 439, 786
Pursglove	328, 708, 879, 983	384
Rainelle	438	291, 397
Ravenswood	273, 440, 512, 868	372
Reader	386	414
Red Creek	866	481
Reedsville	864, 980	681
Richwood	846	628, 844
Ridgeley	303, 726, 738	293, 386
Rio	434, 897	517
Ripley	372, 373, 377, 514, 531, 532, 761, 786	358, 462
Riverton	567	
Rivesville	278, 602	370, 779
Robson	779	
Rockport	474	899
Romney	515, 822	589
Rowlesburg	318, 454	
Rupert	392, 717	262, 303
St. Albans	201, 204, 721, 722, 727, 729, 755, 759, 945	234, 363, 424, 478, 777
St. Marys	684	612
Salem	370, 782	321, 676
Scott Depot	757, 760, 964	234, 235, 424, 478, 691
Shepherdstown	270, 271, 274, 279, 283, 754, 870, 876, 886	240, 547
Shinnston	371, 592	469
Sistersville	401, 652	415
Slatyfork	572	202, 482
Smithfield	334	722
Smithville	477	336
Sod	524	655
South Charleston	744, 746, 747, 756, 766, 767, 768	
Spencer	498, 519, 591, 927	274, 428
Sumerco	306, 524, 915	671
Summersville	495, 618, 619, 651, 872, 880, 883	208, 355, 543
Surveyor	683	
Sutton	402, 644, 678, 689, 701, 750, 765	454
Terra Alta	403, 789, 791	270, 406
Thomas	463	228, 435, 887
Tornado	201, 306, 721, 722, 727, 729, 756, 915, 945	363, 655, 777
Triadelphia	217, 219, 238, 242, 243, 277, 336, 547, 909, 975	226, 618
Tunnelton	568, 603	
Union	772	272
Valley Bend	335, 338, 339	
Valley Grove	217, 219, 336, 547	226
Vienna	295, 580, 588, 699, 916, 917, 991	200, 229, 287, 295, 315, 326, 361, 391, 393, 417, 468, 473, 507, 509, 528, 537, 541, 551, 556, ~~573~~, ~~574~~, 588, 660, 733, 797
Walker	679	445
Walkersville	452, 550	
Wallace	783, 795, 796	
Walton	577, 891	
Wana	662, 798	545, 619
War	875	225, 329, 488
Wardensville	874	717
Washington	861, 863	297, 314
Waverly	464, 679	359, 445
Wayne	272, 501, 706	
Webster Springs	847	213, 256
Weirton	224, 374, 468, 479, 491, 604, 670, 723, 740, 748, 794, 797, 914, 919	223, 328, 348, 486, 522
Welch	297, 436, 448, 585, 705, 970	201, 329, 434, 871
Wellsburg	394, 407, 605, 737	243, 423
West Columbia	882, 971	515
West Milford	404, 745	
West Union	405, 666, 771, 871, 873	431, 688
Weston	266, 269, 406, 517, 805, 884, 904, 997	306, 367, 433, 475, 495, 533, 822
Wheeling	214, 215, 218, 219, 230, 231, 232, 233, 234, 238, 242, 243, 277, 280, 281, 312, 331, 551, 559, 639, 650, 780, 830, 905, 907, 909, 966, 975	327, 437, 508, 618, 880
White Oak	763	
White Sulphur Springs	536, 956	426
Whitesville	854	400
Williamson	235, 236, 443, 475, 899	821
Williamstown	200, 375, 464, 850	359, 449
Wilsondale	385	224
Winfield	586, 936	504
Worthington	213, 287, 566	402
Yawkey	524	671

West Virginia area codes: 304/681
	North: 234/330, 724/878, 227/240/301, 220/740	
West: 606, 220/749	304/681	East: 227/240/301, 540/826
	South: 276	
Kentucky area codes: 270/364, 502, 606, 859
Maryland area codes: 301/240/227, 410/443/667
Ohio area codes: 216, 330/234, 419/567, 440/436, 513/283, 614/380, 740/220, 937/326
Pennsylvania area codes: 215/267/445, 412, 570/272, 610/484/835, 717/223, 724, 814/582, 878
Virginia area codes: 276, 434, 540/826, 703/571, 757/948, 804/686
