= Mabie =

Mabie may refer to:

- Mabie, Dumfries and Galloway, Scotland, a collection of mountain biking routes
- Mabie, California, United States, a census-designated place
- Mabie, West Virginia, United States, an unincorporated community
- Mabie (surname)
