= Spangler (disambiguation) =

Spangler is a surname.

Spangler may also refer to:

== Places ==
- Spangler, Pennsylvania, a former town and borough
- Spangler, West Virginia, an unincorporated community
- Spangler Hills, California, a low mountain range

== Other uses ==
- USS Spangler (DE-696), a US Navy destroyer
- Spangler Center, a Harvard Business School building on the campus of Harvard University
- Spangler Arlington Brugh, birth name of Robert Taylor (actor) (1911–1969)
- Bankhaus Spängler, the oldest private bank in Austria
- Spangler Candy Company, located in Bryan, Ohio, United States

== See also ==
- Spangler Woods, a location used during the American Civil War Battle of Gettysburg
