= Jimtown, Randolph County, West Virginia =

Jimtown
- Unincorporated community
- Location within the state of West Virginia Jimtown (the United States)
- Coordinates: 38°55′6″N 80°0′3″W
- Country: United States
- State: West Virginia
- County: Randolph
- Elevation: 2,392 ft (729 m)

Population (2000)
  - Total: 1,002
- Time zone: UTC-5 (Eastern (EST))
  - Summer (DST): UTC-4 (EDT)
- ZIP code: 26257 (Coalton, WV)
- Area codes: 304 & 681
- GNIS feature ID: 1554810

Jimtown is an unincorporated community on U.S. Highway 33 in Randolph County, West Virginia, United States.

== Geography ==
Jimtown is located in Roaring Creek District of Randolph County on present day County Route 151 (formerly U.S. Route 33), approximately seven miles west of Elkins.

== History ==
Jimtown was formerly known as Fair Hope for the one-room school (late 1800s – c. 1952) which was located at the present-day intersection of Fair Hope, Findley, and Yeager roads. It was named for James Jefferson "Squire Jim" Phillips (1855–1937), a farmer who served as a justice of the peace for Roaring Creek District and whose family owned a majority of the land that now encompasses the community.

== Community ==
Jimtown is served by the Norton-Harding-Jimtown Public Service District, which provides water services to the area. Major roads include County Route 151, which bisects the community, and Jimtown Road, which connects Jimtown to nearby Coalton.

=== Church Bell ===
On September 22, 2007, the school house bell from the old Norton Grade School in Norton, West Virginia, was placed in the steeple at Phillips Chapel. The number 28 C.S. Bell Company steel alloy bell, cast on July 8, 1921, was purchased for the school around 1929 by the West Virginia Coal and Coke Company, the same company which donated the land for the church.

== Phillips Cemetery ==
The Phillips Cemetery was established by the Moses J. Phillips family around the 1870s as a burial ground for the poor and indigent. Civil War veteran, farmer, and coal miner Moses J. Phillips served as a county Overseer of the Poor from 1872 through 1877. The oldest known grave is that of War of 1812 veteran Dudley A. Gibson, which dates back to the year of 1873. Both Union and Confederate veterans of the Civil War are buried there.
