= Sullivan, West Virginia =

Sullivan, West Virginia may refer to:

- Sullivan, Raleigh County, West Virginia, an unincorporated community in Raleigh County
- Sullivan, Randolph County, West Virginia, an unincorporated community in Randolph County
