= Pumpkintown =

Pumpkintown may refer to:

- Pumpkintown, South Carolina, an unincorporated community in Pickens County
- Pumpkintown, West Virginia, an unincorporated community in Randolph County
