= Fahrion =

Fahrion is a surname. Notable people with the surname include:

- Frank G. Fahrion (1894–1970), United States Navy admiral
- João Fahrion (1898–1970), Brazilian painter, engraver, draughtsman, and illustrator
- Muriel Fahrion (born 1958), American illustrator and designer

== See also ==
- Farion
