= Randolph County, West Virginia =

County in West Virginia, United States

Randolph County
- County
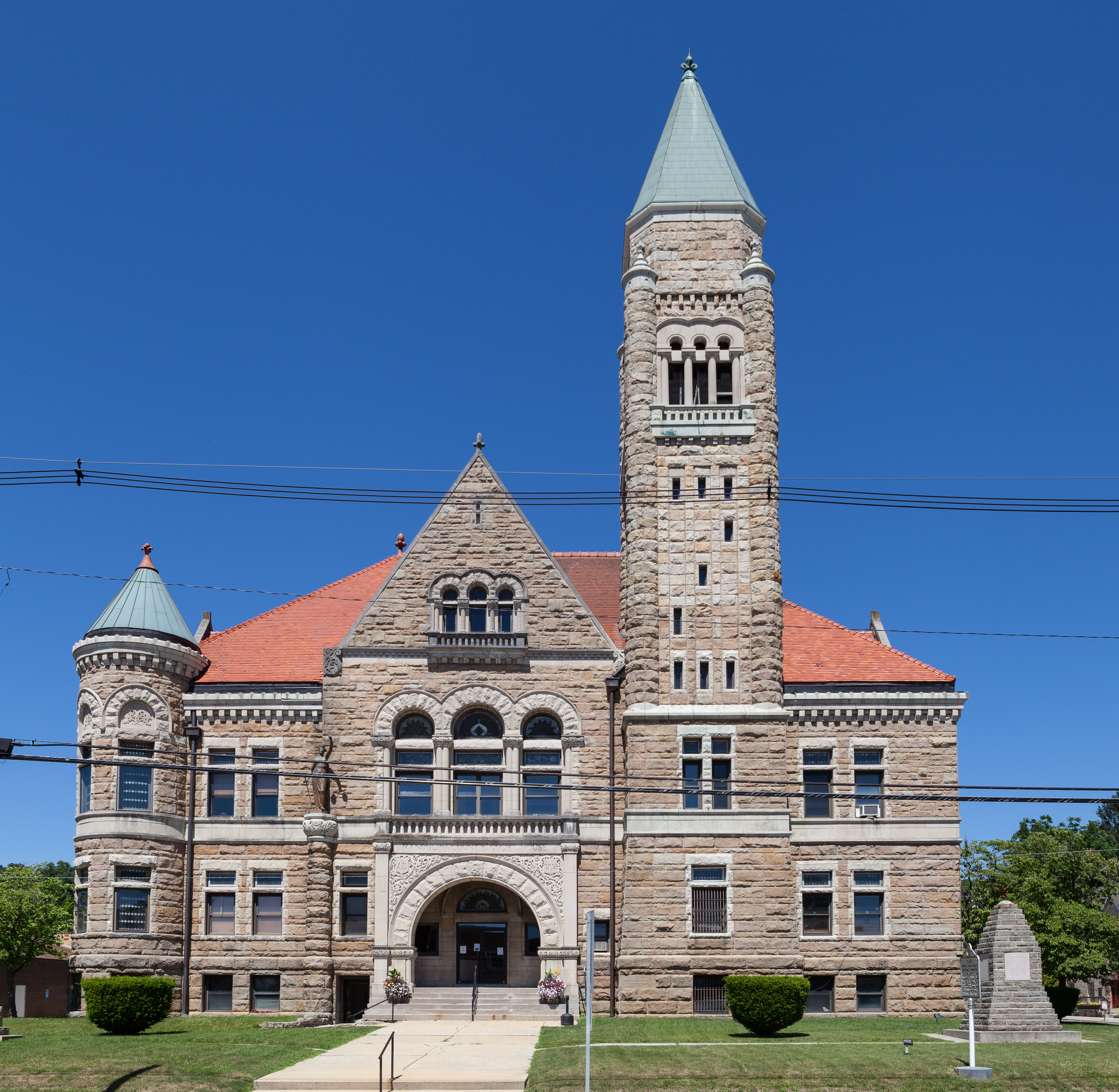
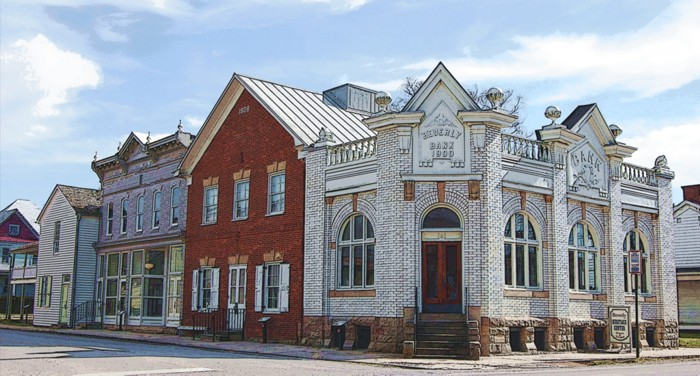
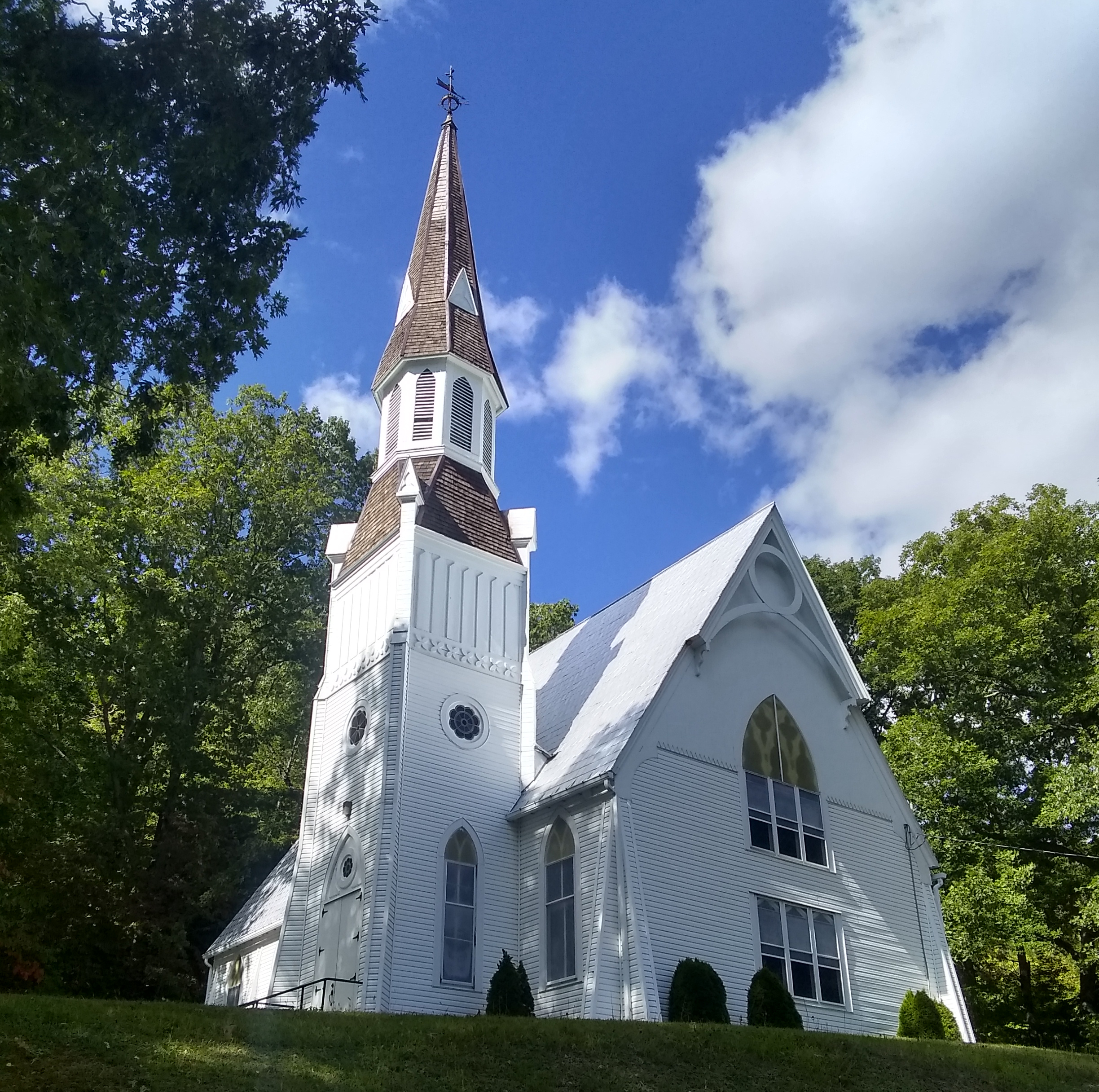
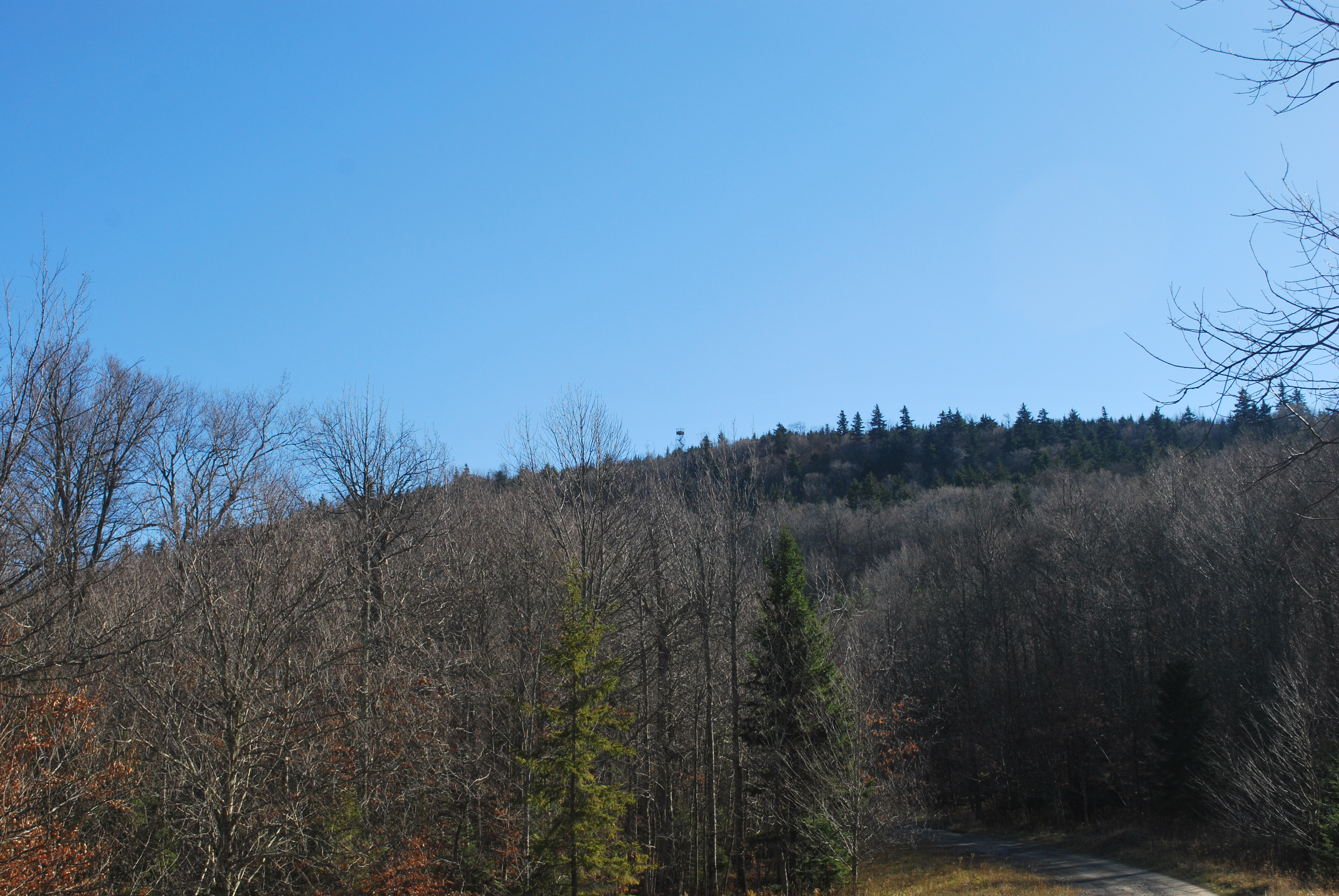
- Randolph County Courthouse in Elkins Beverly Historic District Tygarts Valley Church Old town square in Helvetia Barton Knob

- Seal

- Location of Randolph County in West Virginia

- West Virginia's location within the U.S.
- Country: United States
- State: West Virginia
- Founded: October 16, 1787
- Named for: Edmund Jennings Randolph
- Seat: Elkins
- and largest city

Government
  - Commission President: David Kesling (D)
  - County Commission: Cris Siler (R); Chris See (D)

Area
  - Total: 1,040 sq mi (2,700 km^{2})
  - Land: 1,040 sq mi (2,700 km^{2})
  - Water: 0.3 sq mi (0.78 km^{2}) 0.03%
  - Rank: 1st

Population (2020)
  - Total: 27,932
  - Estimate (2025): 26,882 ▼
  - Rank: 21st
  - Density: 26.9/sq mi (10.4/km^{2})
- Time zone: UTC−5 (Eastern)
  - Summer (DST): UTC−4 (EDT)
- Area codes: 304, 681
- Congressional district: 2nd
- Senate district: 11th
- House of Delegates district: 66th, 67th
- Website: https://randolphctywv.gov/

Randolph County is a county located in the U.S. state of West Virginia. As of the 2020 census, the population was 27,932. Its county seat is Elkins. The county was founded in 1787 and is named for Edmund Jennings Randolph.

Randolph County comprises the Elkins, West Virginia, Micropolitan Statistical Area.

== History ==
The first attempt by Europeans to settle in present-day Randolph County came in 1752 or '53 when David Tygart — for whom the Tygart Valley River was named — and Robert Foyle (later called Files) located (separately) with their families in the vicinity of present-day Beverly. Although there had been no recent history of conflicts between Europeans and Native Americans in that immediate area, that summer a party of Native Americans traveling the Shawnee Trail discovered the Foyle cabin and killed seven members of the family. One son escaped and alerted the Tygart family, allowing all to escape. (The Tygart-Foyle settlements were the first European settlements attempted anywhere within the Monongahela River watershed in present-day West Virginia.) No other European settlement was attempted in present Randolph County until 1772.

Thomas Skidmore (ca. 1733–1807), born in Maryland, obtained a title to 400 acres of land (“by virtue of a settlement”) in the future Elkins area before 1778. This land, on the east side of the Tygart Valley River, was surveyed by John Poage in 1780 and included the land that is now most of downtown Elkins. Thus, Skidmore was probably the first European settler in what became Elkins.

When Randolph County, Virginia (now West Virginia) was created out of the vast Harrison County on October 16, 1787, it included not only present-day Randolph County, but parts of what are now eight other counties. It took its name from the surname of the then Governor of Virginia. The name of the new county seat, originally Randolph Court House, or Edmundton (the latter from the Governor's given name), was changed to Beverly by 1790. Beverly remained the county seat until 1890 when county government was moved to Elkins.

Minor actions of the American Civil War which took place in Randolph County include the Battle of Rich Mountain and a part of the Battle of Cheat Mountain, both in 1861. These operations came in the course of the Western Virginia Campaign.

Randolph was one of fifty Virginia counties that were admitted to the Union as the state of West Virginia on June 20, 1863. Later that year, the new state's counties were divided into civil townships, with the intention of encouraging local government. This proved impractical in the heavily rural state, and in 1872 the townships were converted into magisterial districts. Randolph County was divided into nine districts: Beverly, Clarke, Clay, Dry Fork, Green, Mingo Flats, Reynolds, Scott, and Union. Several of these were renamed during the 1870s: Clark became Valley Bend, Clay became New Interest, Green became Leadsville, Mingo Flats was abbreviated to Mingo, Reynolds became Huttonsville, Scott became Roaring Creek, and Union became Middle Fork.

== Geography ==
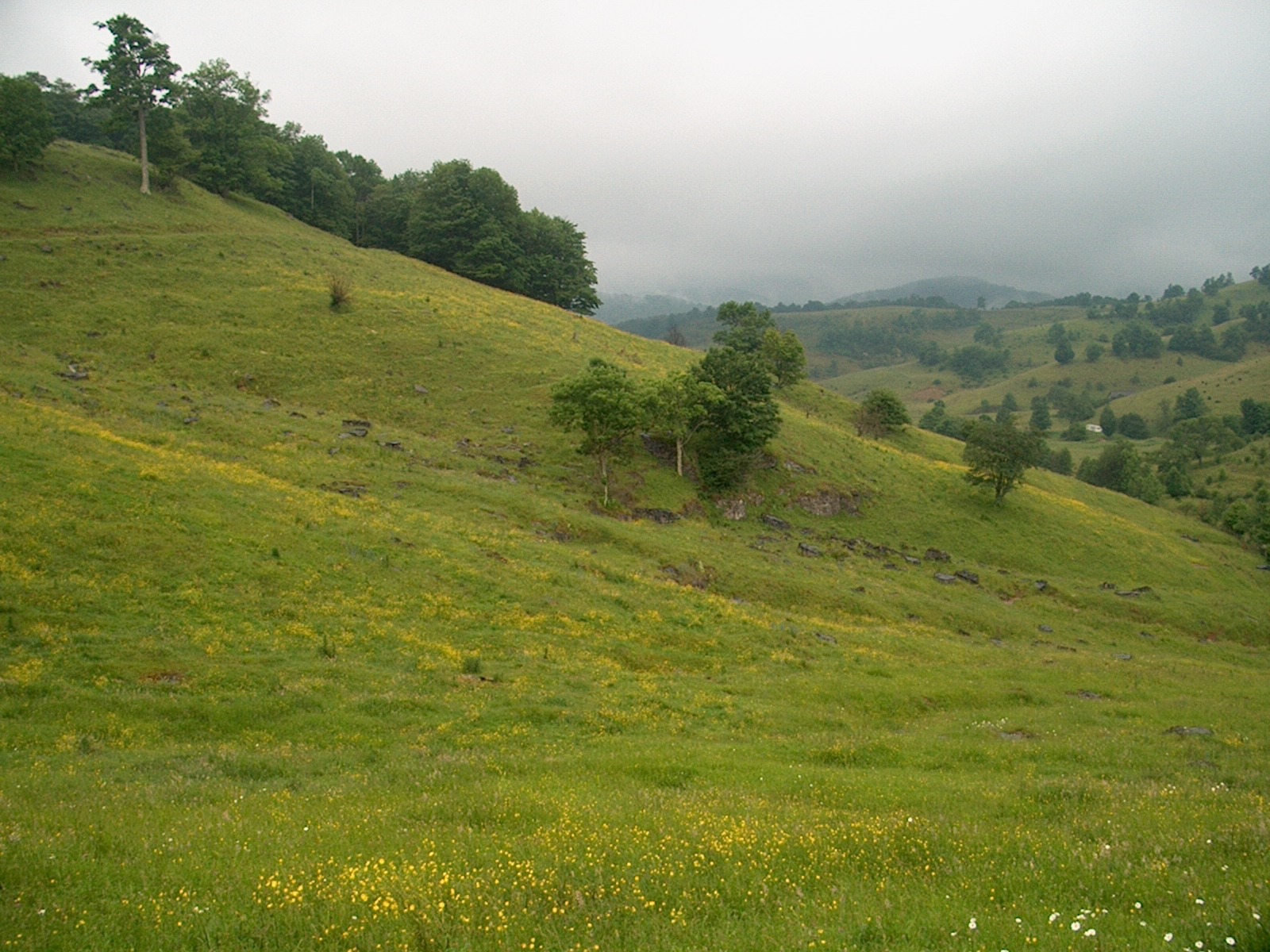
Wildflowers add a splash of color to grazing fields near Osceola in July.

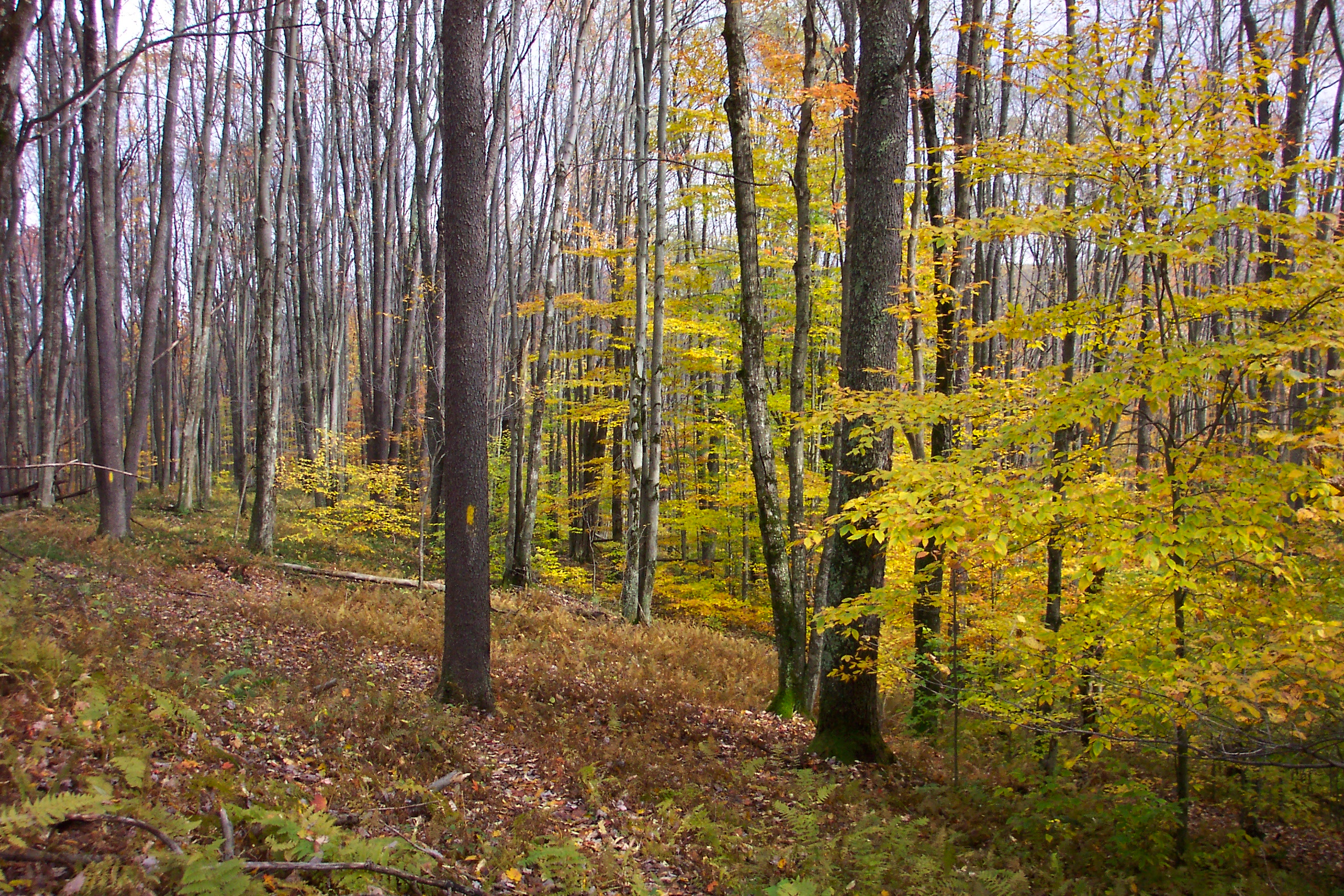
Fall in the forest

According to the United States Census Bureau, the county has a total area of 1,040 square miles (2,700 km^{2}), of which 1,040 square miles (2,700 km^{2}) is land and 0.3 square miles (0.78 km^{2}) (0.03%) is water. It is the largest county in West Virginia by area.

=== Rivers ===
- Tygart Valley River
- Shavers Fork
- Laurel Fork

=== Mountains ===
- Point Mountain
- Cheat Mountain
  - White Top, a knob of Cheat Mountain
- Laurel Mountain
- Rich Mountain
- Shavers Mountain
  - Gaudineer Knob, a knob of Shavers Mountain

=== Caves and caverns ===
- Bowden Cave
- Sinks of Gandy

=== National Natural Landmarks ===
- Blister Run Swamp
- Gaudineer Scenic Area
- Shavers Mountain Spruce-Hemlock Stand

=== Major highways ===
- U.S. Highway 33
- U.S. Highway 48
- U.S. Highway 219
- U.S. Highway 250
- West Virginia Route 15
- West Virginia Route 32
- West Virginia Route 55
- West Virginia Route 92

=== Adjacent counties ===
- Tucker County (northeast)
- Pendleton County (east)
- Pocahontas County (south)
- Webster County (southwest)
- Upshur County (west)
- Barbour County (northwest)

=== National protected area ===
- Monongahela National Forest (part)
- United States National Radio Quiet Zone (part)

== Demographics ==
Historical population
Census	Pop.	Note	%±
1790	951		—
1800	1,826		92.0%
1810	2,854		56.3%
1820	3,357		17.6%
1830	5,000		48.9%
1840	6,208		24.2%
1850	5,243		−15.5%
1860	4,990		−4.8%
1870	5,563		11.5%
1880	8,102		45.6%
1890	11,633		43.6%
1900	17,670		51.9%
1910	26,028		47.3%
1920	26,084		0.2%
1930	25,049		−4.0%
1940	30,259		20.8%
1950	30,558		1.0%
1960	26,349		−13.8%
1970	24,596		−6.7%
1980	28,734		16.8%
1990	27,803		−3.2%
2000	28,262		1.7%
2010	29,405		4.0%
2020	27,932		−5.0%
2025 (est.)	26,882	▼	−3.8%
U.S. Decennial Census; 1790–1960 1900–1990; 1990–2000 2010–2020

=== 2020 census ===
As of the 2020 census, the county had a population of 27,932. Of the residents, 18.6% were under the age of 18 and 22.3% were 65 years of age or older; the median age was 44.4 years. For every 100 females there were 108.3 males, and for every 100 females age 18 and over there were 109.0 males.

The racial makeup of the county was 93.6% White, 1.6% Black or African American, 0.2% American Indian and Alaska Native, 0.4% Asian, 0.5% from some other race, and 3.8% from two or more races. Hispanic or Latino residents of any race comprised 1.1% of the population.

There were 10,980 households in the county, of which 25.8% had children under the age of 18 living with them and 25.9% had a female householder with no spouse or partner present. About 30.4% of all households were made up of individuals and 15.4% had someone living alone who was 65 years of age or older.

There were 13,035 housing units, of which 15.8% were vacant. Among occupied housing units, 72.8% were owner-occupied and 27.2% were renter-occupied. The homeowner vacancy rate was 1.8% and the rental vacancy rate was 11.5%.

Randolph County, West Virginia – Racial and ethnic composition Note: the US Census treats Hispanic/Latino as an ethnic category. This table excludes Latinos from the racial categories and assigns them to a separate category. Hispanics/Latinos may be of any race.
Race / Ethnicity (NH = Non-Hispanic)	Pop 2000	Pop 2010	Pop 2020	% 2000	% 2010	% 2020
White alone (NH)	27,479	28,474	26,033	97.23%	96.83%	93.20%
Black or African American alone (NH)	296	343	424	1.05%	1.17%	1.52%
Native American or Alaska Native alone (NH)	40	63	56	0.14%	0.21%	0.20%
Asian alone (NH)	106	99	96	0.38%	0.34%	0.34%
Pacific Islander alone (NH)	4	0	1	0.01%	0.00%	0.00%
Other race alone (NH)	16	14	85	0.06%	0.05%	0.30%
Mixed race or Multiracial (NH)	130	220	925	0.46%	0.75%	3.31%
Hispanic or Latino (any race)	191	192	312	0.68%	0.65%	1.12%
Total	28,262	29,405	27,932	100.00%	100.00%	100.00%

=== Income and poverty ===
The median income for a household in the county was $47,343 and the poverty rate was 15.2%.

=== 2010 census ===
As of the 2010 United States census, there were 29,405 people, 11,695 households, and 7,753 families living in the county. The population density was 28.3 inhabitants per square mile (10.9/km^{2}). There were 14,189 housing units at an average density of 13.6 per square mile (5.3/km^{2}). The racial makeup of the county was 97.3% white, 1.2% black or African American, 0.3% Asian, 0.2% American Indian, 0.1% from other races, and 0.8% from two or more races. Those of Hispanic or Latino origin made up 0.7% of the population. In terms of ancestry, 26.3% were German, 15.9% were Irish, 12.0% were English, 10.2% were American, and 5.4% were Italian.

Of the 11,695 households, 27.1% had children under the age of 18 living with them, 51.0% were married couples living together, 10.5% had a female householder with no husband present, 33.7% were non-families, and 28.4% of all households were made up of individuals. The average household size was 2.32 and the average family size was 2.81. The median age was 43.4 years.

The median income for a household in the county was $36,176 and the median income for a family was $47,071. Males had a median income of $34,903 versus $25,988 for females. The per capita income for the county was $18,472. About 12.7% of families and 17.1% of the population were below the poverty line, including 26.1% of those under age 18 and 11.4% of those age 65 or over.

=== 2000 census ===
As of the 2000 census, there were 28,262 people, 11,072 households, and 7,661 families living in the county. The population density was 27 people per square mile (10 people/km^{2}). There were 13,478 housing units at an average density of 13 per square mile (5.0/km^{2}). The racial makeup of the county was 97.69% White, 1.07% Black or African American, 0.16% Native American, 0.38% Asian, 0.01% Pacific Islander, 0.16% from other races, and 0.53% from two or more races. 0.68% of the population were Hispanic or Latino of any race.

There were 11,072 households, out of which 29.80% had children under the age of 18 living with them, 54.70% were married couples living together, 9.80% had a female householder with no husband present, and 30.80% were non-families. 26.30% of all households were made up of individuals, and 11.90% had someone living alone who was 65 years of age or older. The average household size was 2.41 and the average family size was 2.89.

In the county, the population was spread out, with 22.30% under the age of 18, 8.70% from 18 to 24, 28.50% from 25 to 44, 25.40% from 45 to 64, and 15.10% who were 65 years of age or older. The median age was 39 years. For every 100 females there were 101.30 males. For every 100 females age 18 and over, there were 99.70 males.

The median income for a household in the county was $27,299, and the median income for a family was $32,632. Males had a median income of $24,751 versus $17,819 for females. The per capita income for the county was $14,918. About 13.40% of families and 18.00% of the population were below the poverty line, including 24.30% of those under age 18 and 12.90% of those age 65 or over.

== Politics ==
United States presidential election results for Randolph County, West Virginia
Year	Republican		Democratic		Third party(ies)	
Year	No.	%	No.	%	No.	%
1912	756	14.82%	2,563	50.25%	1,782	34.93%
1916	2,165	39.78%	3,024	55.57%	253	4.65%
1920	4,158	46.11%	4,676	51.85%	184	2.04%
1924	3,526	36.59%	5,314	55.14%	797	8.27%
1928	4,436	46.22%	5,085	52.99%	76	0.79%
1932	3,418	31.29%	7,397	67.72%	108	0.99%
1936	3,711	31.34%	8,109	68.48%	22	0.19%
1940	4,196	33.14%	8,465	66.86%	0	0.00%
1944	3,681	36.88%	6,299	63.12%	0	0.00%
1948	3,802	36.52%	6,586	63.25%	24	0.23%
1952	5,452	43.87%	6,976	56.13%	0	0.00%
1956	5,448	48.88%	5,697	51.12%	0	0.00%
1960	5,018	41.79%	6,989	58.21%	0	0.00%
1964	2,984	27.14%	8,012	72.86%	0	0.00%
1968	4,508	41.11%	5,562	50.72%	897	8.18%
1972	6,923	64.51%	3,809	35.49%	0	0.00%
1976	4,822	39.89%	7,265	60.11%	0	0.00%
1980	4,374	40.05%	5,937	54.36%	610	5.59%
1984	6,100	55.64%	4,839	44.14%	25	0.23%
1988	4,746	47.38%	5,233	52.24%	38	0.38%
1992	3,496	34.20%	5,097	49.86%	1,629	15.94%
1996	3,348	33.18%	5,469	54.21%	1,272	12.61%
2000	5,248	55.00%	4,028	42.21%	266	2.79%
2004	6,512	56.68%	4,892	42.58%	86	0.75%
2008	6,060	55.94%	4,539	41.90%	234	2.16%
2012	6,160	63.00%	3,342	34.18%	276	2.82%
2016	7,629	69.55%	2,735	24.93%	605	5.52%
2020	8,673	71.09%	3,362	27.56%	165	1.35%
2024	8,356	72.07%	3,008	25.94%	230	1.98%

== Communities ==
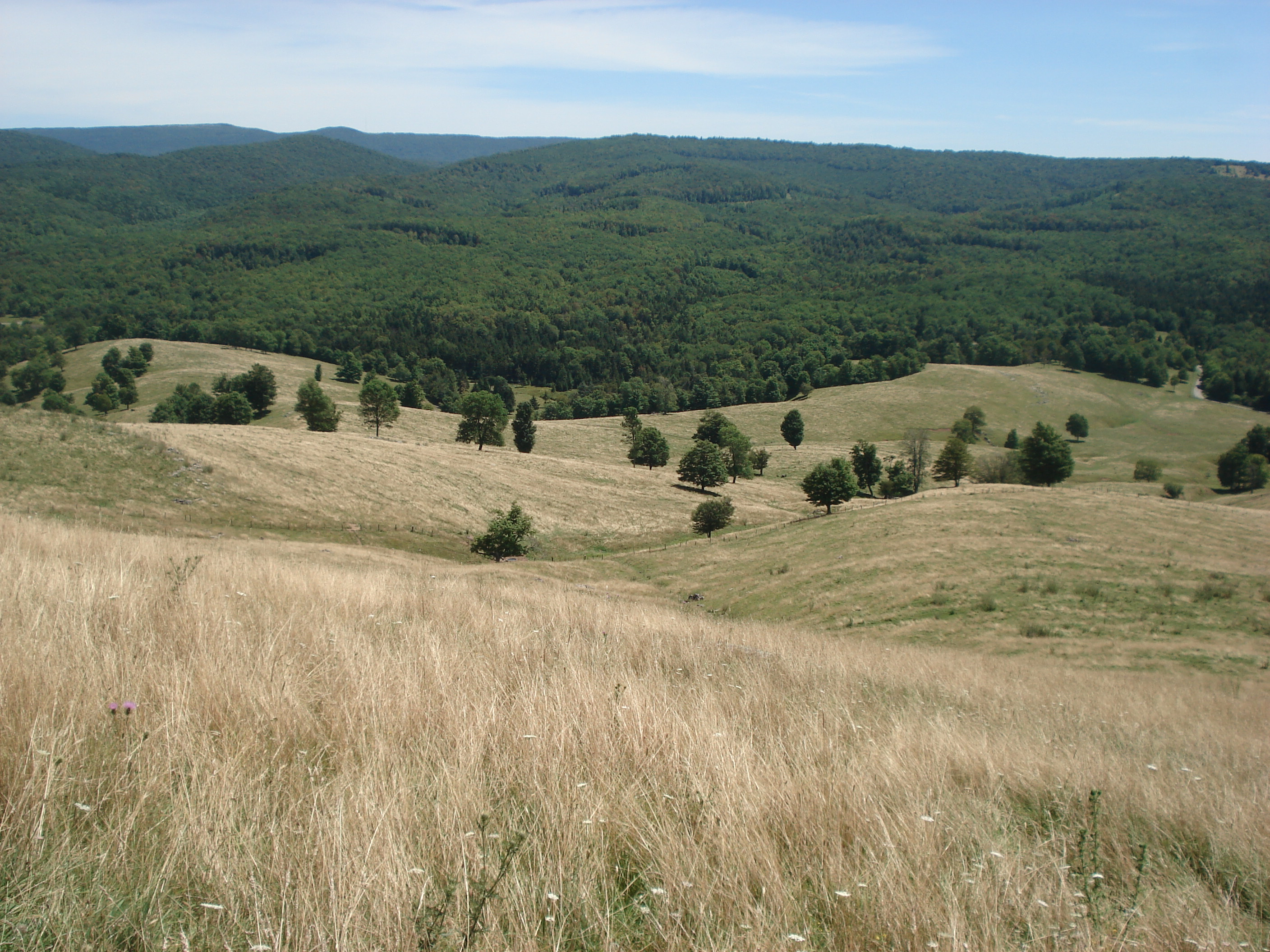
View from atop Yokum Knob, Randolph County, West Virginia

=== City ===
- Elkins (county seat)

=== Towns ===
- Beverly
- Harman
- Huttonsville
- Mill Creek
- Montrose
- Womelsdorf (Coalton)

=== Magisterial districts ===
- Beverly
- Dry Fork
- Huttonsville
- Leadsville
- Middle Fork
- Mingo
- New Interest
- Roaring Creek
- Valley Bend

=== Census-designated places ===
- Bowden
- Dailey
- East Dailey
- Helvetia
- Pickens
- Valley Bend
- Valley Head
- Whitmer

=== Unincorporated communities ===
- Adolph
- Aggregates
- Alpena
- Arnold Hill
- Bemis
- Brady Gate
- Bruxton
- Canfield
- Cassity
- Crystal Springs
- Czar
- Dryfork
- Elkins Junction
- Elkwater
- Ellamore
- Evenwood
- Faulkner
- Glady
- Horton
- Jimtown
- Kerens
- Little Italy
- Mabie
- Mingo
- Monterville
- Newlonton
- Norton
- Osceola
- Pumpkintown
- Read
- Spangler
- Sullivan
- Tigheville
- Upper Mingo
- Weaver
- Whyte

== Notable people ==
- Herman Ball, football player
- Lemuel Chenoweth, master covered bridge builder
- William Wallace Barron, former governor who was indicted for bribery and jury tampering.
- Dellos Clinton "Sheriff" Gainer, major league baseball player
- Marshall Goldberg, football player
- Wilma Lee Cooper Grand Ole Opry and WWVA Jamboree star
- Stoney Cooper, Grand Ole Opry and WWVA Jamboree star
- Eldora Marie Bolyard Nuzum, American newspaper editor and interviewer of U.S. Presidents

== See also ==
- Becky Creek Wildlife Management Area
- National Register of Historic Places listings in Randolph County, West Virginia
