= Cassity, West Virginia =

Unincorporated community in West Virginia, United States

- Unincorporated community
- Location within West Virginia Location within the United States
- Coordinates: 38°49′34″N 80°02′05″W
- Country: United States
- State: West Virginia
- County: Randolph
- Elevation: 2,028 ft (618 m)
- Time zone: UTC-5 (Eastern (EST))
  - Summer (DST): UTC-4 (EDT)
- Area codes: 304 & 681
- GNIS feature ID: 1554084

Cassity is an unincorporated community in Randolph County, West Virginia, United States. Cassity is located at the confluence of the Cassity Fork and the Middle Fork River along County Route 35, 8.7 miles (14.0 km) west of Beverly.
