= Arnold Hill =

Arnold Hill may refer to:

- Arnold Hill, West Virginia, an unincorporated community in Randolph County
- Arnold Hill Academy, a mixed secondary school and sixth form located in the county of Nottinghamshire, England

== See also ==
- Arnold Hills (1857–1927), English businessman, sportsman, philanthropist, and promoter of vegetarianism
