= Wreck on the Highway =

Wreck on the Highway may refer to:

- "Wreck on the Highway" (1938 song), written by Dorsey Dixon and most notably performed by Roy Acuff
- "Wreck on the Highway" (1980 song), written and performed by Bruce Springsteen
