= Jimtown =

Jimtown is the name of several communities in the United States, including:

- Jimtown, Delaware
- Jimtown, Indiana
- Jimtown, Missouri
- Jimtown, Ohio
- Jimtown, Oregon
- Jimtown, West Virginia (disambiguation), multiple locations
- Jimtown, Wisconsin
