= Jimtown, West Virginia =

Jimtown is the name of several communities in the U.S. state of West Virginia.

- Jimtown, Harrison County, West Virginia
- Jimtown, Morgan County, West Virginia
- Jimtown, Randolph County, West Virginia
