= Monterville, West Virginia =

- Unincorporated community
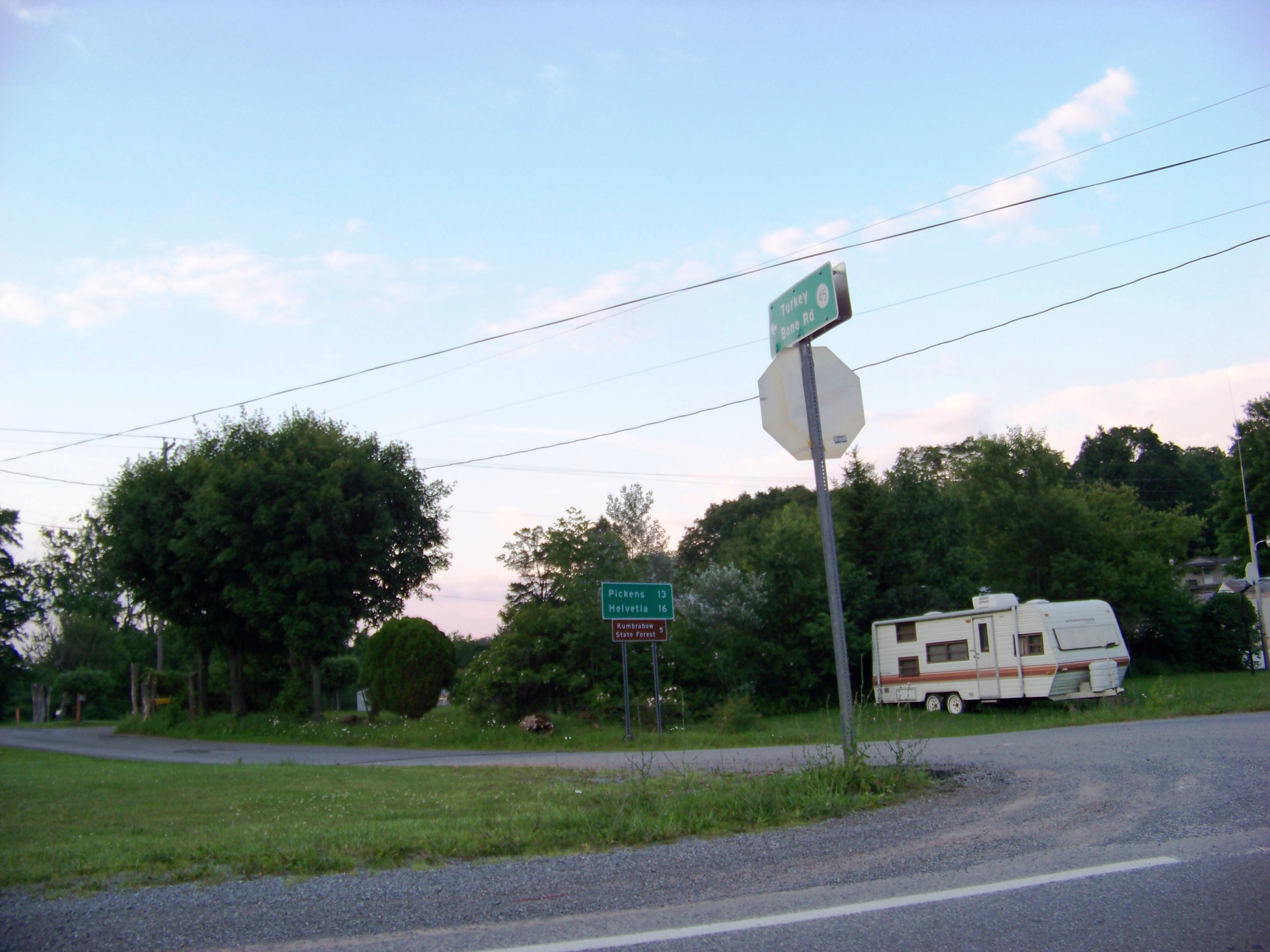

- Location within West Virginia Location within the United States
- Coordinates: 38°33′32″N 80°06′18″W
- Country: United States
- State: West Virginia
- County: Randolph
- Elevation: 3,271 ft (997 m)
- Time zone: UTC-5 (Eastern (EST))
  - Summer (DST): UTC-4 (EDT)
- ZIP code: 26282
- Area codes: 304 & 681
- GNIS feature ID: 1555153

Monterville is an unincorporated community in Randolph County, West Virginia, United States. Monterville is 12.5 miles (20.1 km) southwest of Huttonsville. Monterville had a post office, which closed on June 20, 2009.

John Ernest Monterville Bing, an early postmaster, gave the community his name.
