= Osceola, West Virginia =

Osceola
- Unincorporated community
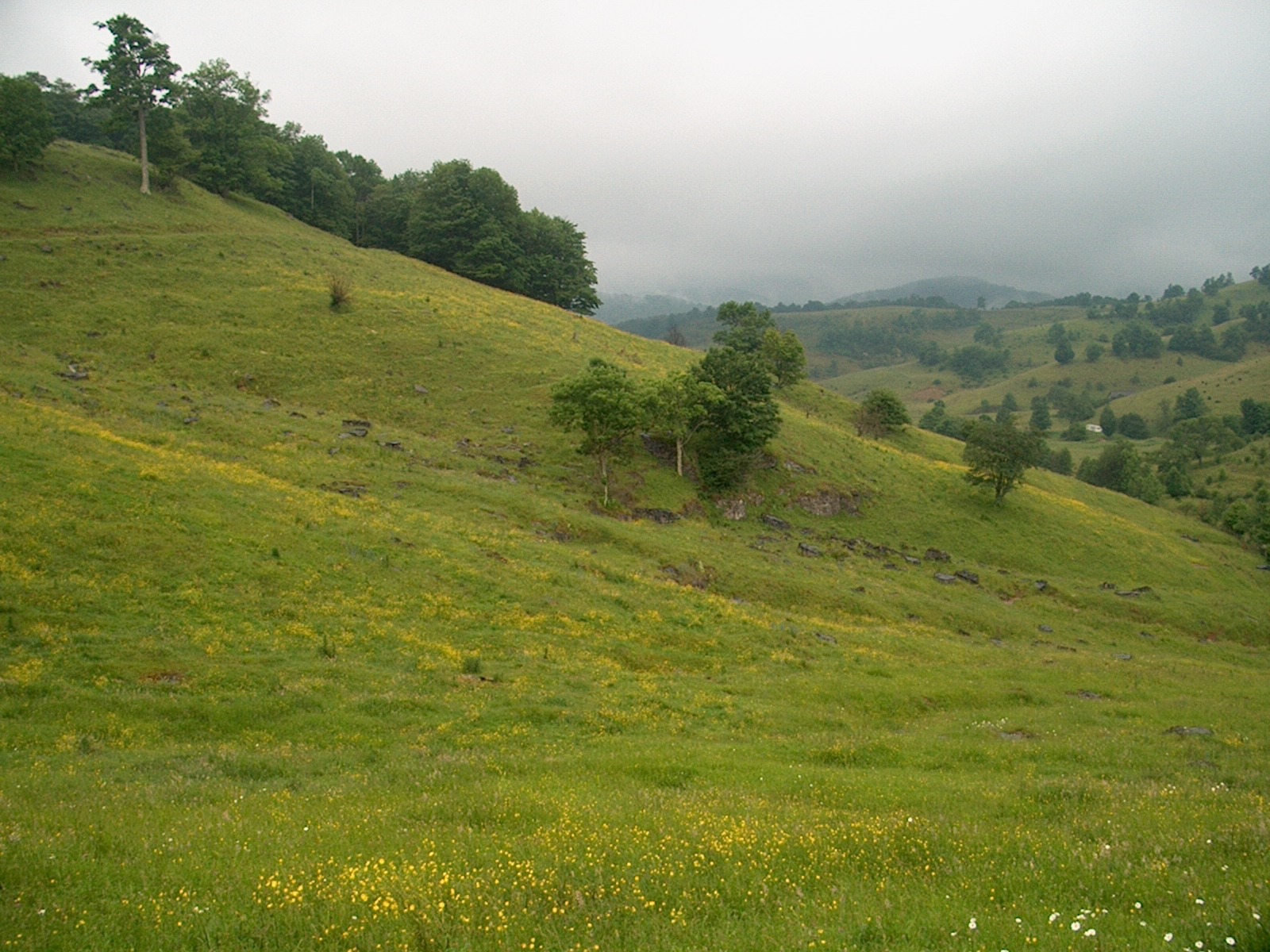
- Wildflowers add a splash of color to grazing fields near Osceola, West Virginia in July 2006

- Location within the state of West Virginia Osceola (the United States)
- Coordinates: 38°42′50″N 79°38′00″W
- Country: United States
- State: West Virginia
- County: Randolph
- Time zone: UTC-5 (Eastern (EST))
  - Summer (DST): UTC-4 (EDT)

Osceola is a former logging community in eastern Randolph County, West Virginia, USA. It was located within what is now the Monongahela National Forest on Gandy Creek at the southern extremity of Little Middle Mountain and Yokum Knob.

The community was named after Osceola, a Seminole chief.

During the period 1900 to 1915, Osceola was a sizable lumbering town of several hundred loggers, timbermen, sawmill operators and saloonkeepers who made the most of the then booming timber industry. Today, virtually no trace of the former settlement is evident. A few scattered hunting camps and farmhouses occupy the area.

Osceola was very near the celebrated Sinks of Gandy Creek and modern maps as often designate the place as “The Sinks”.
