= Newlonton, West Virginia =

Newlonton
- Unincorporated community
- Location within the state of West Virginia Newlonton (the United States)
- Coordinates: 38°44′40″N 80°14′8″W
- Country: United States
- State: West Virginia
- County: Randolph
- Elevation: 1,906 ft (581 m)
- Time zone: UTC-5 (Eastern (EST))
  - Summer (DST): UTC-4 (EDT)
- GNIS ID: 1544153

Newlonton is an unincorporated community in Randolph County, West Virginia, United States.
