= Valley Head, West Virginia =

- Census-designated place
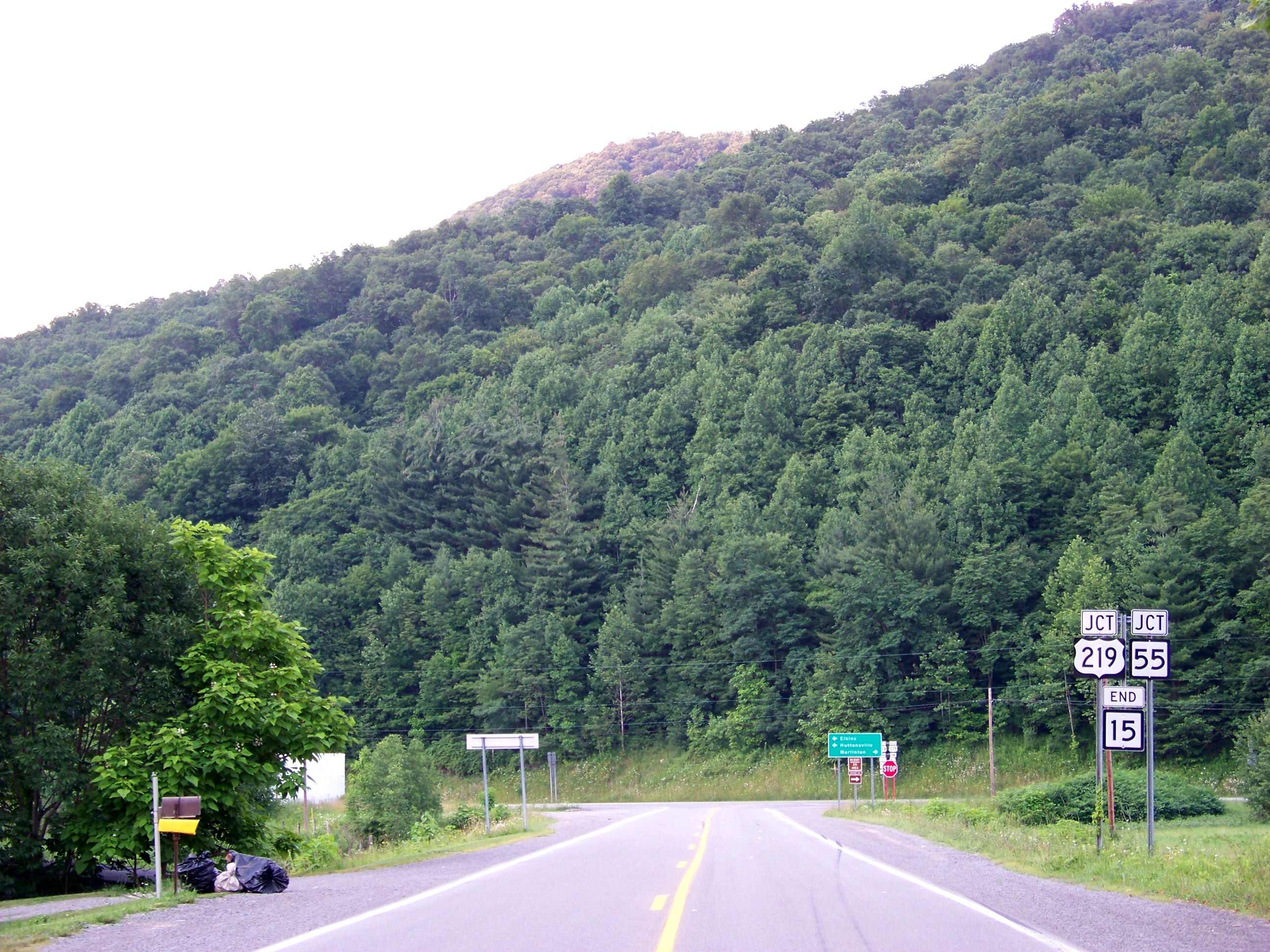
- Outside Valley Head

- Location within West Virginia Location within the United States
- Coordinates: 38°32′42″N 80°02′09″W
- Country: United States
- State: West Virginia
- County: Randolph

Area
  - Total: 0.975 sq mi (2.53 km^{2})
  - Land: 0.975 sq mi (2.53 km^{2})
  - Water: 0 sq mi (0 km^{2})
- Elevation: 2,372 ft (723 m)

Population (2020)
  - Total: 207
  - Density: 212/sq mi (82.0/km^{2})
- Time zone: UTC-5 (Eastern (EST))
  - Summer (DST): UTC-4 (EDT)
- ZIP code: 26294
- Area codes: 304 & 681
- GNIS feature ID: 1555870

Valley Head is a census-designated place (CDP) in Randolph County, West Virginia, United States. Valley Head is located on U.S. Route 219, 12 miles (19 km) south-southwest of Huttonsville. Valley Head has a post office with ZIP code 26294. As of the 2020 census, its population was 207 (down from 267 at the 2010 census).

The community was named for the nearby headwaters of the Tygart Valley River.

== Notable people ==
- Country musician and Grand Ole Opry member Wilma Lee Cooper was born in Valley Head in 1921.
- Banking executive Jean Yokum was born in Valley Head in 1931.

== Climate ==
The climate in this area has mild differences between highs and lows, and there is adequate rainfall year-round. According to the Köppen Climate Classification system, Valley Head has a marine west coast climate, abbreviated "Cfb" on climate maps.

Climate data for Valley Head, West Virginia, 2000–2012 normals: 2425ft (739m)
| Month | Jan | Feb | Mar | Apr | May | Jun | Jul | Aug | Sep | Oct | Nov | Dec | Year |
|---|---|---|---|---|---|---|---|---|---|---|---|---|---|
| Record high °F (°C) | 66 (19) | 73 (23) | 76 (24) | 84 (29) | 85 (29) | 88 (31) | 92 (33) | 86 (30) | 84 (29) | 80 (27) | 78 (26) | 72 (22) | 92 (33) |
| Mean maximum °F (°C) | 59.0 (15.0) | 60.3 (15.7) | 69.4 (20.8) | 79.8 (26.6) | 81.1 (27.3) | 83.8 (28.8) | 84.5 (29.2) | 83.1 (28.4) | 80.3 (26.8) | 75.6 (24.2) | 71.0 (21.7) | 61.1 (16.2) | 85.5 (29.7) |
| Mean daily maximum °F (°C) | 36.0 (2.2) | 40.0 (4.4) | 49.3 (9.6) | 61.3 (16.3) | 69.0 (20.6) | 74.8 (23.8) | 77.3 (25.2) | 76.4 (24.7) | 70.9 (21.6) | 60.9 (16.1) | 51.9 (11.1) | 39.6 (4.2) | 59.0 (15.0) |
| Daily mean °F (°C) | 26.8 (−2.9) | 29.9 (−1.2) | 37.7 (3.2) | 48.3 (9.1) | 56.6 (13.7) | 63.2 (17.3) | 66.8 (19.3) | 66.2 (19.0) | 60.0 (15.6) | 49.3 (9.6) | 40.3 (4.6) | 30.7 (−0.7) | 48.0 (8.9) |
| Mean daily minimum °F (°C) | 17.6 (−8.0) | 19.8 (−6.8) | 26.0 (−3.3) | 35.4 (1.9) | 44.2 (6.8) | 51.6 (10.9) | 56.4 (13.6) | 56.0 (13.3) | 49.1 (9.5) | 37.6 (3.1) | 28.8 (−1.8) | 21.8 (−5.7) | 37.0 (2.8) |
| Mean minimum °F (°C) | −3.2 (−19.6) | 1.4 (−17.0) | 10.4 (−12.0) | 23.3 (−4.8) | 30.7 (−0.7) | 42.0 (5.6) | 47.8 (8.8) | 47.8 (8.8) | 36.2 (2.3) | 24.7 (−4.1) | 15.4 (−9.2) | 3.6 (−15.8) | −5.4 (−20.8) |
| Record low °F (°C) | −14 (−26) | −13 (−25) | 2 (−17) | 16 (−9) | 25 (−4) | 35 (2) | 43 (6) | 43 (6) | 32 (0) | 20 (−7) | 3 (−16) | −3 (−19) | −14 (−26) |
| Average precipitation inches (mm) | 3.70 (94) | 3.22 (82) | 4.24 (108) | 4.17 (106) | 5.34 (136) | 4.72 (120) | 6.05 (154) | 4.41 (112) | 3.38 (86) | 3.14 (80) | 3.42 (87) | 3.59 (91) | 49.38 (1,256) |
| Average snowfall inches (cm) | 20.9 (53) | 13.2 (34) | 12.1 (31) | 2.1 (5.3) | 0.0 (0.0) | 0.0 (0.0) | 0.0 (0.0) | 0.0 (0.0) | 0.0 (0.0) | 0.5 (1.3) | 3.2 (8.1) | 15.4 (39) | 67.4 (171.7) |
Source 1: XMACIS2
Source 2: NOAA (precip/snowfall)
