= Mabie, West Virginia =

- Unincorporated community
- Location within West Virginia Location within the United States
- Coordinates: 38°52′35″N 79°58′59″W
- Country: United States
- State: West Virginia
- County: Randolph
- Elevation: 2,251 ft (686 m)
- Time zone: UTC-5 (Eastern (EST))
  - Summer (DST): UTC-4 (EDT)
- ZIP code: 26278
- Area codes: 304 & 681
- GNIS feature ID: 1555016

Mabie is an unincorporated community in Randolph County, West Virginia, United States. Mabie is 1.5 miles (2.4 km) southwest of Womelsdorf (Coalton). Mabie has a post office with ZIP code 26278. The town was originally named Roaring Creek after the stream that passes through the community, but the name was later changed to Mabie after W. H. Mabie built a sawmill there in 1897.

== History ==
The first settlers arrived in the area beginning 1786 for the purpose of clearing the land for farming. Later, newcomers were drawn to the area by its vast timber and mineral resources. At one time, old growth forests with trees up to six or seven feet in diameter surrounded the community, and a seam of coal twelve feet thick was discovered in 1876. The original Staunton and Parkersburg Turnpike bisects the community before it crosses Rich Mountain. The Battle of Rich Mountain was fought nearby on July 11, 1861.
