= Spangler =

Spangler is a surname. Notable people with the surname include:

- Aaron Spangler (born 1971), American sculptor and printmaker
- Al Spangler (born 1933), American baseball player
- Amy Spangler (born 1949), American breastfeeding activist, nurse, author, and teacher
- Angela Bradburn-Spangler (born 1968), American high jumper
- Clemmie Spangler (1932–2018), American businessman
- David Spangler (congressman) (1796–1856), American politician from Ohio
- David Spangler (philosopher) (born 1945), American spiritualist
- Donald H. Spangler (1918–1942), United States Naval officer
- Edmund Spangler (1825–1875), alleged conspirator of the Abraham Lincoln assassination
- Gary Spangler (born ?), American music executive
- Gene Spangler (1922–2010), American football player
- Harrison E. Spangler (1879–1965), American politician and chairman of the Republican National Committee
- Jacob Spangler (1767–1843), American politician from Pennsylvania
- James M. Spangler (1848–1915), American inventor and janitor; designed the first portable electric vacuum cleaner
- Jean Spangler (1923–disappeared 1949), American dancer, model, and actress
- Jenny Spangler (born 1963), American long-distance runner
- Ken Spangler (born 1967), Canadian hockey player
- Lester Spangler (1906–1933), American race car driver
- Lisa Spangler (born 1994), American mixed martial artist
- Matthew Spangler (born ?), American playwright, director, and professor
- Paul Spangler (1899–1994), American naval surgeon and long-distance runner
- Robert Spangler (1933–2001), American serial killer
- Robert Spangler (American football) (1917–1992), American football and basketball player, and coach
- Ryan Spangler (born 1991), American basketball player
- Spanky Spangler (born ?), American stunt man and actor
- Steve Spangler (born 1966), American television personality, scientist, author, and businessman
- Tommy Spangler (born 1961), American football coach

== Fictional characters ==
- Edwin Spangler, television role from Malcolm in the Middle
- Moist von Lipwig, (alias Albert Spangler), character from Terry Pratchett’s Discworld series of novels
