= Sinks of Gandy =

Cave in West Virginia, US

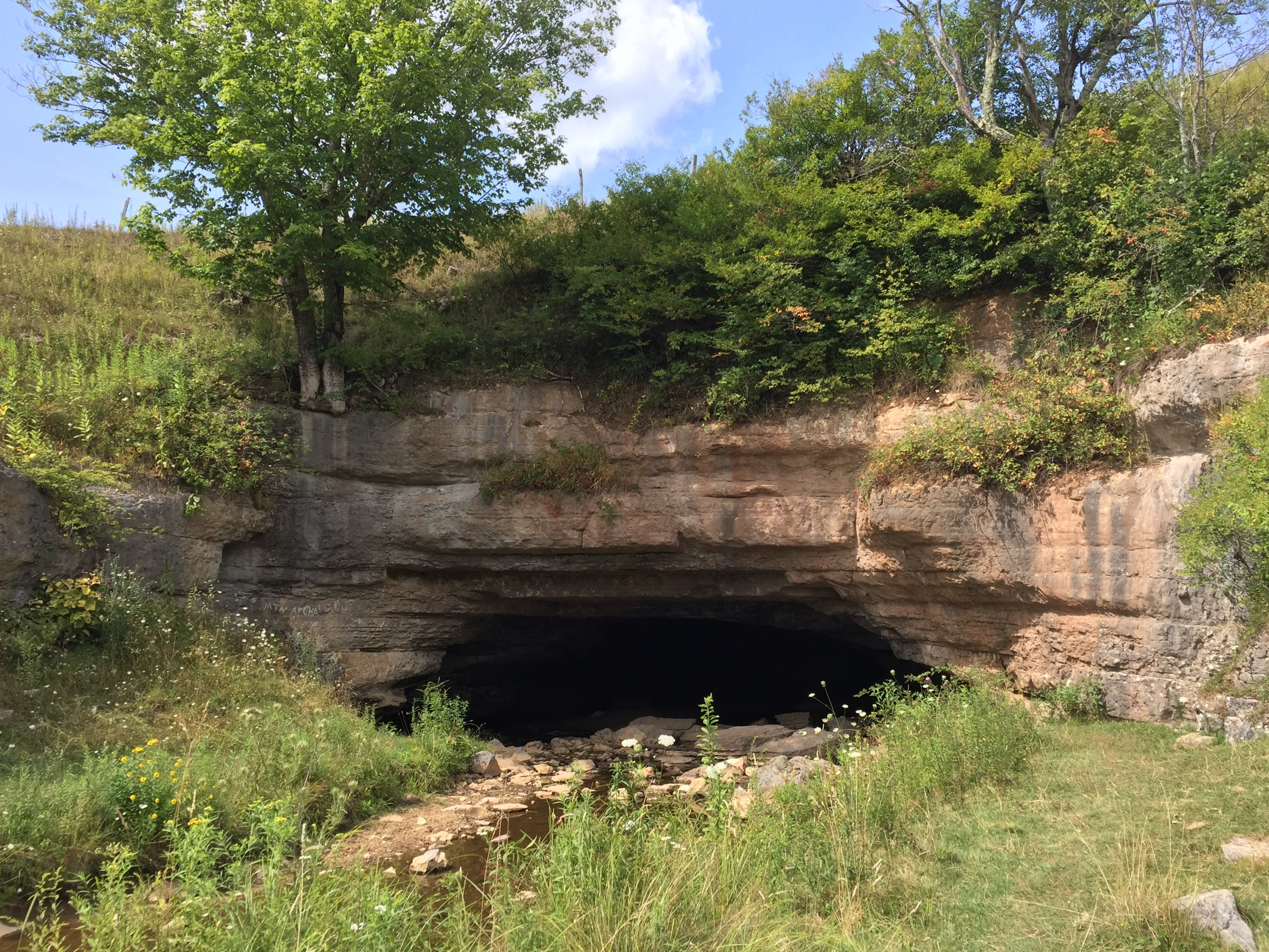
- Upper Entrance to the Sinks of Gandy
- Interactive map of Sinks of Gandy
- Location: Osceola, West Virginia, U.S.
- Coordinates: 38°42′53″N 79°38′33″W
- Length: 8,114 feet (2,473 m)
- Discovery: Before 1830s
- Geology: Greenbrier Limestone
- Entrances: 3
- Access: Private land; Access generally uncontrolled

The Sinks of Gandy — also called the Sinks of Gandy Creek, or simply "The Sinks" — are a modestly celebrated cave and underground stream at Osceola in eastern Randolph County, West Virginia, United States. The Sinks are on private property within the Monongahela National Forest.

== Description ==
The Sinks are a natural tunnel accommodating Gandy Creek, a tributary of Dry Fork, for about 3,000 feet (910 meters) as it passes under a spur of Yokum Knob to reemerge on the opposite side of Randolph County Route 40 (Dry Fork Road). The southern (upstream) entrance to the Sinks, about 30 feet (9.1 m) wide and 15 feet (4.6 m) high, is in a low ledge of limestone in a large depressed meadow. It consists of a simple longitudinal passage, from 4 to 35 feet (11 m) high, with a few minor side passages, not much apparent from the main passage. The main cave passage averages 40 to 60 feet (18 m) wide, but in some places up to 100 feet (30 m) wide. In some sections the stream occupies the entire floor of the passage, but in other sections it is confined to a narrow trench. The northern (downstream) entrance is offset about 100 feet (30 m) to the east of the stream channel, which exits under some boulders, making a second (wet) avenue of egress.

== History ==
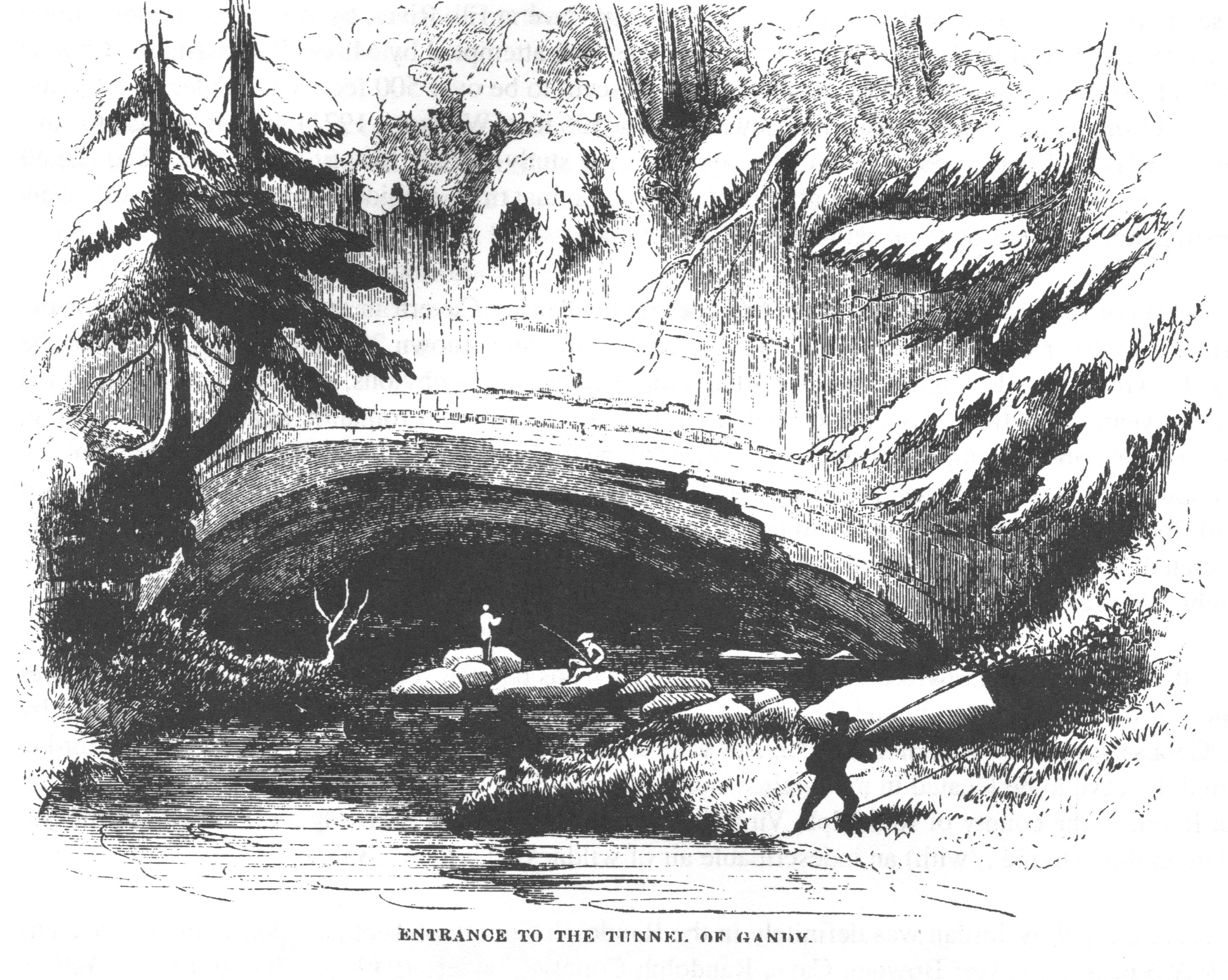
The "Tunnel of Gandy" as it appeared in the 1850s. Source: Strother's 1873 Harper's article, "The Mountains".

Gandy Creek — and thus the Sinks themselves — were named for Uriah Gandy (or Gandee) who settled in the area around 1781. Local settlers were certainly well aware of the Sinks by the 1830s. The earliest recorded reference to the Sinks may be a November 1833 letter sent by Randolph County physician Benjamin Dolbeare to the Virginia Historical and Philosophical Society in Richmond. Dolbeare described several local caves including one as follows (with original spellings).

"Between, what is here called, the Aleghany and Rich Mountains, heads a branch of the dry fork a tributary of Cheat River, a ridge extends itself quiet across, from one mountain to the other, and this branc[h], after keeping its course about 3 miles runs under this ridge which [is] about ¾ of mile wide at its base, and very high."

The Sinks were noted locally as the site of the last known killings of elk by hunters in what is now Randolph County, probably about 1830 and 1835. (The last elk killed in all of West Virginia were shot around 1843 in nearby Canaan Valley.)

In March 1864, a minor incident of the Civil War occurred at the Sinks. Eight men of General Imboden's Confederate command, who had been waylaying wagon trains in the north, crossed into neighboring Tucker County where they robbed a general store about 3 miles from the town of Saint George. They were pursued by a Union captain and lieutenant who closed on them the next day at the Sinks. Three rebels were killed in the ensuing shootout, two captured and the stolen property recovered.

The Sinks first came to widespread public notice by way of a tongue-in-cheek account of a pleasure expedition to the region published by David Hunter Strother in Harper's Magazine in 1872 and 1873, although the visit upon which it is based probably occurred around 1854. This story, entitled "The Mountains", details the high jinx of a group of lively "Virginia gentlemen" who bumble through the then-virgin forest, annoying the sullen local "mountaineers", in search of the "tunnel of Gandy". This semi-fictionalized narrative treated the locals in rather xenophobic terms and recounted a lurid tale of cattle rustling, abduction and desperate escape in the cave and the surrounding area.

The Sinks again became the object of a popularization effort when West Virginia writer Jack Preble published a series of articles and booklets about them between the 1940s and the 1960s. Preble's anecdotal and romanticizing approach was little more reliable than Strother's at giving an accurate account of the cave. It was also during this period that the West Virginia Highway Department began, with an eye toward the tourist potential, to replace the designation of "Osceola" with that of "The Sinks" on its official roadmaps.

The Sinks were first formally surveyed and mapped by members of the National Speleological Society on 1 September 1940 resulting in a figure of 3,056 feet (931 m) of passage. The cave was resurveyed in 1990 resulting in 5,058 additional feet for a total of 8,114 feet (2,473 m) of passage. This makes the Sinks the 669th longest surveyed cave in the U.S. as of 10 March 2014

== Access ==
Both entrances to the Sinks are located on private land. The upstream entrance is owned by the Teter family and the downstream exit (formerly owned by the Tingler family) is owned by the Keplinger family. (This same Teter family owned this land way back in 1854 when David Hunter Strother visited.) The location of the cave is not identified by any signage in the area. A parking lot on Dry Fork Road (County Route 40) for the Sinks is located at 38°42′55.8″N 79°38′15.7″W, with a trail to the upstream end starting nearby.

The cave is relatively forgiving to inexperienced visitors. Because of its straightforward layout, most visitors can traverse it safely with simple household flashlights. A combination of scrambling and wading is required to pass some stretches, however, and many a visitor cannot locate the dry, downstream entrance (about 200 feet (61 m) back and to the right from the wet stream exit) and is therefore compelled to return the way he came in.
