= Jean Yokum =

American financial executive (1931–2021)

Jean M. Yokum (March 8, 1931 – August 19, 2021) was an American banking executive.

== Early years ==
Norma Jean Mace was born in 1931 in Valley Head, West Virginia. She was a straight-A high school student and married Charles M. Yokum in 1948 after graduating. She worked as a bookkeeper in a general store owned by Charles' father before she and Charles moved to Poquoson, Virginia when he was drafted for the Korean War and stationed at Langley Air Force Base.

== Career ==
In 1953, Yokum was hired as a teller at the Langley Federal Credit Union (LFCU) in Hampton, Virginia. She took on the role of assistant bookkeeper before becoming the director of accounting. She completed a three-year course through the Credit Union Business School in Wisconsin. She served as the credit union's assistant manager and in 1979 was appointed president and CEO. The National Association of Federal Credit Unions named her Credit Union Professional of the Year in 1983. During her tenure, the financial institution's assets grew from $76 million in 1979 to $1.6 billion in 2011. Yokum retired from LFCU in 2012. The credit union's Jean M. Yokum $5,000 College Scholarship is named for her.

== Community activism ==
Yokum chaired the boards of the Peninsula Retail Merchants Association and Peninsula Family Services and served on the boards of the USO of Hampton Roads and the Virginia Air and Space Center. She also served on community services boards and on the boards of state and national credit union associations. She served on the board of the Defense Credit Union Council (DCUC) for 20 years and was its chair. She received the Virginia Credit Union League's James P. Kirsch Lifetime Achievement Award in 2010. She was inducted into the DCUC Hall of Honor in 2013. She owned over 1000 pairs of shoes.
