= USS Fall River (CA-131) =

Heavy cruiser of the United States Navy

Coordinates: 41.7049606°N 71.1624407°W

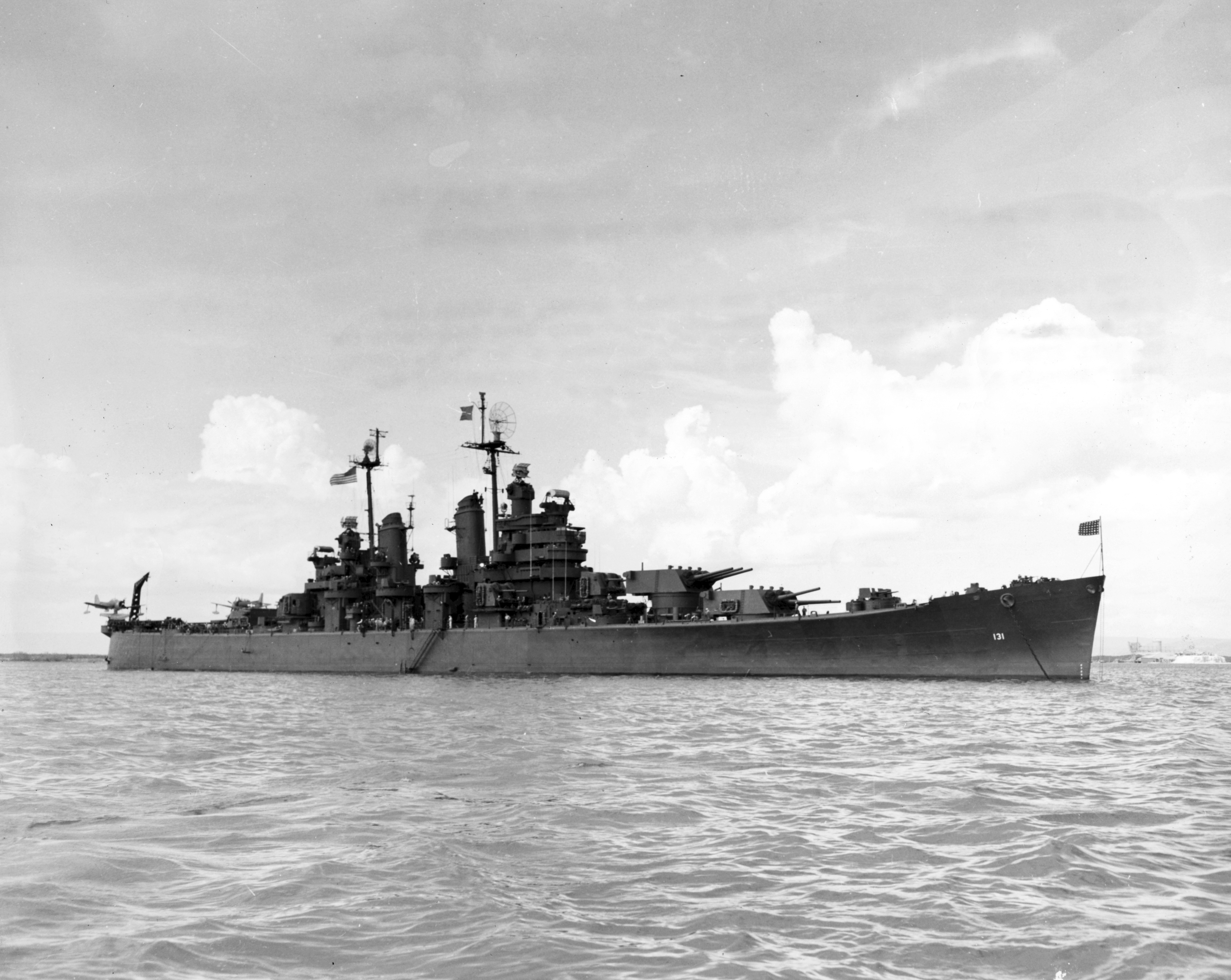
- USS Fall River on 12 August 1945

History

United States
- Name: Fall River
- Namesake: City of Fall River, Massachusetts
- Ordered: 9 July 1942
- Builder: New York Shipbuilding
- Laid down: 12 April 1943
- Launched: 13 August 1944
- Commissioned: 1 July 1945
- Decommissioned: 31 October 1947
- Stricken: 19 February 1971
- Identification: Callsign: NTDM; Hull number: CA-131
- Honors and awards: See Awards
- Fate: Scrapped, 28 August 1972
- Notes: Bow resides at Battleship Cove

General characteristics
- Class & type: Baltimore-class cruiser
- Displacement: 13,600 long tons (13,818 t)
- Length: 674 ft 11 in (205.71 m)
- Beam: 70 ft 10 in (21.59 m)
- Draft: 20 ft 6 in (6.25 m)
- Propulsion: General Electric geared turbines, 120,000 shp (89 MW), 4 screws
- Speed: 33 knots (61 km/h; 38 mph)
- Complement: 1,142 officers and enlisted
- Armament: 9 × 8"/55 caliber guns (3×3); 12 × 5"/38 caliber guns (6×2); 48 × Bofors 40 mm guns (12×4); 24 × single Oerlikon 20 mm cannons
- Armor: Belt: 6 in (150 mm); Turrets: 8 in (200 mm); Deck: 2.5 in (64 mm); Conning tower: 6.5 in (170 mm)

USS Fall River (CA-131) was a Baltimore-class heavy cruiser of the United States Navy. It was launched on 13 August 1944 by the New York Shipbuilding Corporation of Camden, New Jersey; sponsored by Mrs. Alexander C. Murray, wife of Fall River mayor Alexander C. Murray; and commissioned on 1 July 1945, Captain David Stolz Crawford in command.

== Service history ==
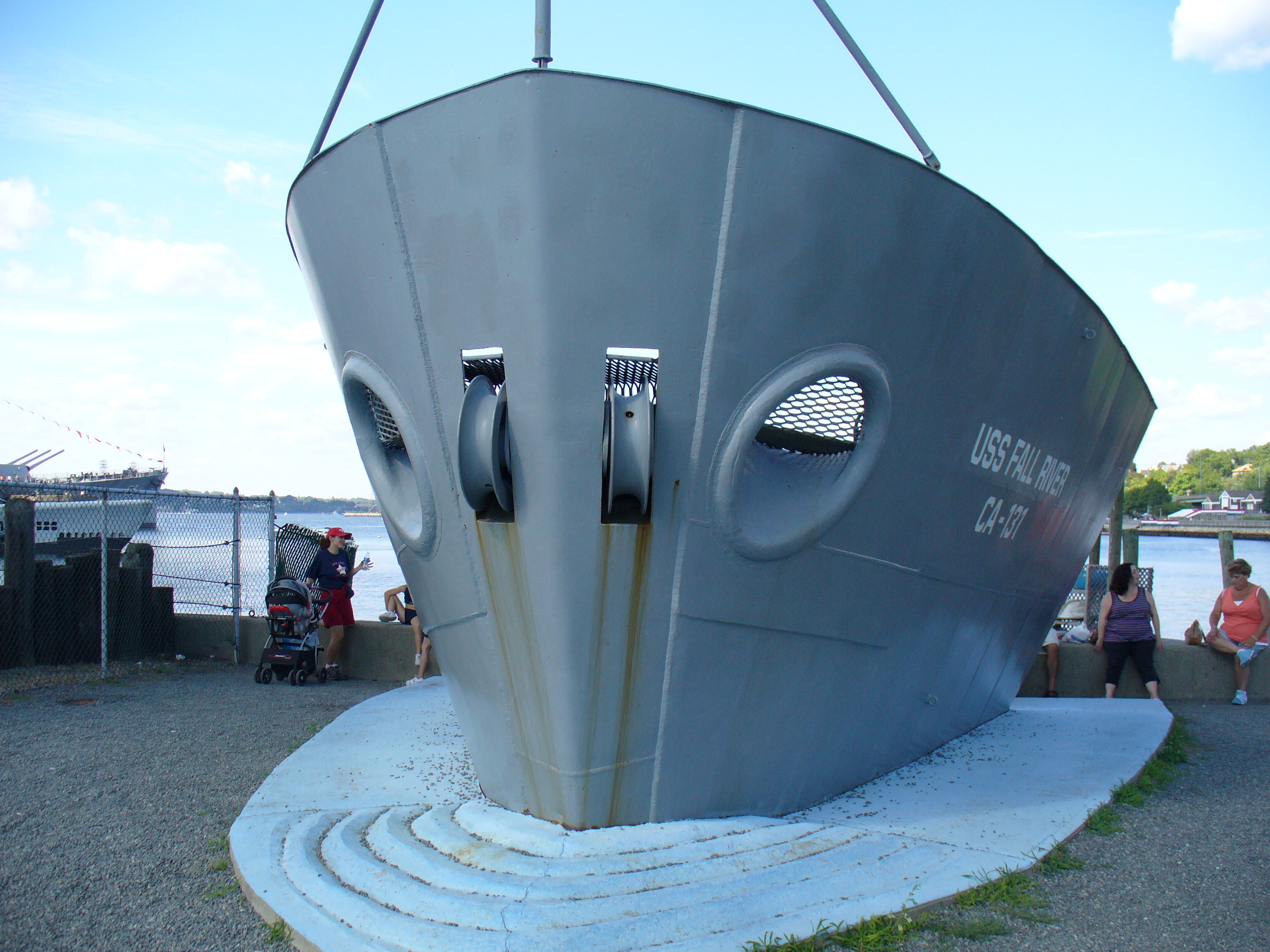
Bow of USS Fall River at Battleship Cove

On 31 October 1945, Fall River arrived at Norfolk, out of which she sailed in experimental development operations until 31 January 1946. The cruiser was assigned to JTF 1, organized to conduct Operation Crossroads, atomic weapons tests in the Marshall Islands in the summer of 1946. To prepare for this duty, Fall River sailed to San Pedro, California, where from 16 February to 6 March she was altered to provide flagship accommodations. Arriving at Pearl Harbor on 17 March, she embarked Rear Admiral Frank G. Fahrion, commander of the target vessel's group for the tests, and with him sailed in the Marshalls between 21 May and 14 September.

After west coast training, Fall River served a tour of duty in the Far East as flagship of Cruiser Division 1 from 12 January 1947 to 17 June 1947. Authorized during World War II but completed too late to see service in that conflict, the Fall River was caught in the post-war economizing measures, despite her recent completion and lack of wartime damage. She returned to Puget Sound Navy Yard, where she was placed out of commission in reserve on 31 October 1947. Proposals to convert her into an Albany-class guided missile cruiser were cancelled when sister ship Columbus was determined to be in better material condition. Fall River continued to reside in the reserve fleet until stricken on 19 February 1971, and sold on 28 August 1972 to Zidell Explorations Corp., Portland, Oregon.

The tip of her bow is now on display at Battleship Cove.

== Awards ==
- American Campaign Medal
- World War II Victory Medal
- Navy Occupation Medal
- China Service Medal
