= Pickens, West Virginia =

- Census-designated place
- Location within West Virginia Location within the United States
- Coordinates: 38°39′18″N 80°12′42″W
- Country: United States
- State: West Virginia
- County: Randolph

Area
  - Total: 2.031 sq mi (5.26 km^{2})
  - Land: 2.031 sq mi (5.26 km^{2})
  - Water: 0 sq mi (0 km^{2})
- Elevation: 2,687 ft (819 m)

Population (2020)
  - Total: 41
  - Density: 20/sq mi (7.8/km^{2})
- Time zone: UTC-5 (Eastern (EST))
  - Summer (DST): UTC-4 (EDT)
- ZIP code: 26230
- Area codes: 304 & 681
- GNIS feature ID: 1544793

Pickens is a census-designated place (CDP) in Randolph County, West Virginia, United States. Pickens is 13 miles (21 km) west-southwest of Huttonsville. It is the home of the Cunningham-Roberts Museum. Pickens has a post office with ZIP code 26230. As of the 2020 census, its population was 41 (down from 66 at the 2010 census).

== History ==
In 1891, George M. Whitescarver (1831–1914), a railroad official and coal and timber magnate, along with several other investors, purchased a large tract of land in Randolph County from James Pickens Jr. Here they built several planing mills and a sawmill that had a capacity of ten million feet per year. Pickens was founded and named the following year, by which time the railroad had been extended to that point.

== Events ==
Pickens hosts West Virginia's yearly maple syrup festival.

== Climate ==
Pickens experiences mild-to-warm, humid summers and cold, snowy winters, with abundant precipitation falling evenly throughout the year. Due to its elevation, latitude, and position within the Allegheny Mountains, summer temperatures rarely reach 90 °F, while winters typically see well over 100 inches of snowfall. According to the Köppen Climate Classification system, Pickens has a humid continental climate, abbreviated "Dfb" on climate maps.

Climate data for Pickens 2 N, West Virginia, 1991–2020 normals, 1996-2020 precip/snowfall: 2880ft (878m)
Month	Jan	Feb	Mar	Apr	May	Jun	Jul	Aug	Sep	Oct	Nov	Dec	Year
Record high °F (°C)	67 (19)	71 (22)	78 (26)	85 (29)	85 (29)	87 (31)	91 (33)	89 (32)	94 (34)	80 (27)	78 (26)	72 (22)	94 (34)
Mean maximum °F (°C)	61.0 (16.1)	61.4 (16.3)	68.3 (20.2)	77.7 (25.4)	79.6 (26.4)	82.9 (28.3)	83.7 (28.7)	84.2 (29.0)	81.9 (27.7)	74.4 (23.6)	68.1 (20.1)	62.1 (16.7)	84.1 (28.9)
Mean daily maximum °F (°C)	36.4 (2.4)	38.7 (3.7)	47.5 (8.6)	58.2 (14.6)	67.1 (19.5)	74.0 (23.3)	76.9 (24.9)	76.5 (24.7)	72.2 (22.3)	61.2 (16.2)	49.2 (9.6)	41.1 (5.1)	58.3 (14.6)
Daily mean °F (°C)	28.3 (−2.1)	30.4 (−0.9)	38.6 (3.7)	49.1 (9.5)	58.3 (14.6)	65.5 (18.6)	68.9 (20.5)	67.7 (19.8)	62.7 (17.1)	51.9 (11.1)	40.9 (4.9)	33.6 (0.9)	49.7 (9.8)
Mean daily minimum °F (°C)	20.1 (−6.6)	22.1 (−5.5)	29.6 (−1.3)	40.0 (4.4)	49.5 (9.7)	57.0 (13.9)	60.9 (16.1)	58.9 (14.9)	53.3 (11.8)	42.6 (5.9)	32.7 (0.4)	26.1 (−3.3)	41.1 (5.0)
Mean minimum °F (°C)	−0.6 (−18.1)	1.8 (−16.8)	9.1 (−12.7)	21.4 (−5.9)	33.4 (0.8)	44.1 (6.7)	50.4 (10.2)	49.8 (9.9)	40.1 (4.5)	27.5 (−2.5)	14.9 (−9.5)	4.8 (−15.1)	−2.5 (−19.2)
Record low °F (°C)	−11 (−24)	−13 (−25)	0 (−18)	14 (−10)	28 (−2)	34 (1)	42 (6)	44 (7)	33 (1)	22 (−6)	2 (−17)	−6 (−21)	−13 (−25)
Average precipitation inches (mm)	5.50 (140)	4.42 (112)	5.49 (139)	5.93 (151)	7.17 (182)	5.91 (150)	6.64 (169)	4.91 (125)	4.97 (126)	3.99 (101)	4.57 (116)	5.17 (131)	64.67 (1,642)
Average snowfall inches (cm)	33.0 (84)	23.8 (60)	16.3 (41)	6.1 (15)	trace	0.0 (0.0)	0.0 (0.0)	0.0 (0.0)	0.0 (0.0)	2.1 (5.3)	8.5 (22)	24.4 (62)	114.2 (289.3)
Source 1: NOAA
Source 2: XMACIS (precip/snowfall, temp records & monthly max/mins)

== Notable people ==
- Admiral Frank G. Fahrion, USN, was born in Pickens.
- John Joseph Swint (1879–1962), fourth bishop of the Roman Catholic Diocese of Wheeling and later named archbishop ad personam by Pope Pius XII, was born and raised in Pickens.
- Hans Lineweaver (1907–2009), physical chemist known for popularizing the double-reciprocal plot, was born in Pickens.
