= County Route 151 (Randolph and Upshur Counties, West Virginia) =

County highway in West Virginia, USA

CR 151

Route information
- Length: 22.54 mi (36.27 km)

Major junctions
- East end: US 33 near Norton
- West end: WV 20 at Buckhannon

Location
- Country: United States
- State: West Virginia
- Counties: Upshur, Randolph

Highway system
- County Routes in West Virginia

County Route 151 (CR 151) is an east–west county highway serving Randolph and Upshur counties in the U.S. state of West Virginia. The western terminus of the route is at WV 20 in Buckhannon, West Virginia. The eastern terminus is at U.S. Route 33 near Norton, West Virginia. CR 151 is the former alignment of US 33 which was bypassed by the completion of Corridor H of the Appalachian Development Highway System between Buckhannon and Elkins in 1994, and was designated as part of the Staunton-Parkersburg Turnpike National Scenic Byway in 2005.
