= Czar, West Virginia =

Unincorporated community in West Virginia, United States

Czar
- Unincorporated community
- Location within the state of West Virginia Czar (the United States)
- Coordinates: 38°43′48″N 80°11′13″W
- Country: United States
- State: West Virginia
- County: Randolph
- Elevation: 2,168 ft (661 m)
- Time zone: UTC-5 (Eastern (EST))
  - Summer (DST): UTC-4 (EDT)
- GNIS feature ID: 1554249

Czar (/siːzɑːr/) is an unincorporated community in Randolph County, West Virginia, United States, near the Upshur County line.

The origin of the name "Czar" is obscure. The name may be a corruption of the given name Zar.
