= Hans Lineweaver =

American biochemist

- Born: December 25, 1907; Pickens, West Virginia
- Died: June 10, 2009 (aged 101); Walnut Creek, California
- Education: George Washington University (BA, 1933), Johns Hopkins University (PhD 1936)
- Known for: Double-reciprocal plot
- Children: 11 great-greatgrandchildren at the time of his death
- Scientific career
- Fields: Biochemistry
- Workplaces: U.S. Department of Agriculture, Western Regional Research Center, Albany, California

Hans Lineweaver (December 25, 1907 – June 10, 2009) was an American physical chemist, who is credited with introducing the double-reciprocal plot or Lineweaver–Burk plot. The paper containing the equation was co-authored by Dean Burk, and was entitled "The Determination of Enzyme Dissociation Constants (1934)". It remains the most frequently cited paper to appear in the Journal of the American Chemical Society. Lineweaver and Burk collaborated with the eminent statistician W. Edwards Deming on the statistical analysis of their data: they used the plot for illustrating the results, not for the analysis itself.

Linearizations of the Henri-Michaelis-Menten law of enzyme kinetics were important in the era before general availability of computers to determine the parameters V_{max} and K_{m} from experimental data, even though there are significant statistical problems involved in this procedure. These are still used for data presentation. All three possible methods of linearization (now often called Lineweaver-Burk, Eadie-Hofstee and Hanes plots, respectively) were originally proposed by Barnet Woolf, who was unable to formally publish them due to injuries received in a car accident. However, he had discussed them with his close friend and fellow member of the British Communist Party, J. B. S. Haldane, who referred to them in his seminal book on enzyme kinetics. However, the linearizations were largely ignored until they were re-invented by the authors whose name they now bear.

Lineweaver developed the Lineweaver–Burk equation in 1934 while still a graduate student, working as a laboratory assistant under Burk at the U.S. Department of Agriculture in Washington, D.C. He was an internationally recognized authority on food technology as applied to the processing, preservation and safety of poultry and eggs.

== Early life ==
Lineweaver received his Bachelor of Arts degree in chemistry from George Washington University in 1930, and continued on to receive his Master of Arts degree there in 1933. He obtained his PhD in physical chemistry from Johns Hopkins University in 1936. In 1929, a year before graduating, he was appointed a junior scientific aide to the U.S. Department of Agriculture, and worked as a chemist in the fertilizer section of the Bureau of Chemistry and Soils. In 1930, Lineweaver was transferred to the Food Research Division of the USDA as an associate chemist, pursuing enzyme research. In 1939, he was transferred to the newly built Western Regional Research Laboratory of the USDA in Albany, California, as senior biochemist and head of the enzyme section in the biochemical division. During and after World War II, Lineweaver collaborated with the Quartermasters Corps of the Armed Services in enzyme work related to poultry and powdered egg flavor and processing. In 1948, he was appointed chief of the WRRL Poultry Laboratory in 1949, a position he held until his retirement in 1973, after 44 years of continuous service for the U.S. Department of Agriculture.

During his career, Lineweaver was the author or co-author of nearly 100 technical publications and six patents, over half of which concern aspects of poultry and eggs, such as effects of processing on tenderness, and the remainder with enzymology or other aspects of biochemistry, including, for example, a review of pectic enzymes. He and his team developed the first USDA-approved method of pasteurizing egg white, and established a process of converting waste feathers into feed. He has received honors, citations and awards, including the Nicholas Appert Award from the Institute of food Technologists (IFT) in 1973. Hans was a President of the IFT in 1971, and was appointed by the State Department to chair the U.S. Delegation to the 12th World Poultry Congress in Australia in 1962. He was an active member or chairman of organizations including the American Chemical Society, the Poultry Science Association, the World Poultry Science Association, the Poultry and Egg National Board, the Institute of American Poultry Industries, and the American Society of Biological Chemists.

== Personal life ==
Hans Lineweaver was born in Pickens, West Virginia, on Christmas Day, 1907, the second child of Rev. Dr. Jesse Luther and Lucille Lineweaver. He was married in 1936 to Margaret Peggy Coon of Baltimore, MD, and was the father of 2, the grandfather of 15, the great-grandfather of 29 at the time of his death, and the great-great-grandfather of 11. He lived in retirement in Walnut Creek, California. Lineweaver died in Walnut Creek on June 10, 2009, at age 101.
