= Tigheville, West Virginia =

Tigheville
- Unincorporated community
- Location within the state of West Virginia Tigheville (the United States)
- Coordinates: 38°58′47″N 79°55′11″W
- Country: United States
- State: West Virginia
- County: Randolph
- Elevation: 1,955 ft (596 m)
- Time zone: UTC-5 (Eastern (EST))
  - Summer (DST): UTC-4 (EDT)
- GNIS ID: 1555813

Tigheville is an unincorporated community in Randolph County, West Virginia, United States.
