= Read, West Virginia =

Read
- Unincorporated community
- Location within the state of West Virginia Read (the United States)
- Coordinates: 38°57′11″N 79°50′34″W
- Country: United States
- State: West Virginia
- County: Randolph
- Elevation: 1,916 ft (584 m)
- Time zone: UTC-5 (Eastern (EST))
  - Summer (DST): UTC-4 (EDT)
- GNIS ID: 1555450

Read is an unincorporated community in Randolph County, West Virginia, United States.
