= John Joseph Swint =

American prelate

His Excellency, The Most Reverend John Joseph Swint
- Archbishop (personal title); Bishop of Wheeling; Titular Bishop of Sura
- See: Diocese of Wheeling
- In office: December 11, 1922; November 23, 1962
- Predecessor: Patrick James Donahue
- Successor: Joseph Howard Hodges
- Previous post: Auxiliary Bishop of Wheeling (May to December 1922)

Orders
- Ordination: June 23, 1904 by Patrick James Donahue
- Consecration: May 11, 1922 by Michael Joseph Curley

Personal details
- Born: December 15, 1879 Pickens, West Virginia, US
- Died: November 23, 1962 (aged 82) Wheeling, West Virginia, US
- Denomination: Roman Catholic
- Education: St. Charles College; St. Mary's Seminary
- Motto: Ut omnes unum sint (That they all may be one)

John Joseph Swint (December 15, 1879 – November 23, 1962) was an American prelate of the Roman Catholic Church. He served as bishop of the Diocese of Wheeling in West Virginia from December 1922 until his death in 1962. He was auxiliary bishop of the same diocese from May to December 1922.

== Biography ==
=== Early life ===
One of nine children, John Swint was born on December 15, 1879, in Pickens, West Virginia, to Peter and Caroline (née Winkler) Swint, who were immigrants from Central Europe. He studied at St. Charles College in Ellicott City, Maryland, obtaining a Bachelor of Arts in 1899. He then enrolled at St. Mary's Seminary in Baltimore, earning a Bachelor of Sacred Theology in 1904.

=== Priesthood ===
Swint was ordained to the priesthood in Wheeling, West Virginia, by Bishop Patrick James Donahue for the Diocese of Wheeling on June 23, 1904. After studying at the Apostolic Mission House in Washington, D.C. for a year, he returned to West Virginia and served as pastor of St. Patrick Parish in Hinton from 1905 to 1908. Swint was named as head of the Diocesan Apostolate in 1908, then became pastor of St. Patrick Parish in Weston, West Virginia, in 1914.

=== Auxiliary Bishop and Bishop of Wheeling ===
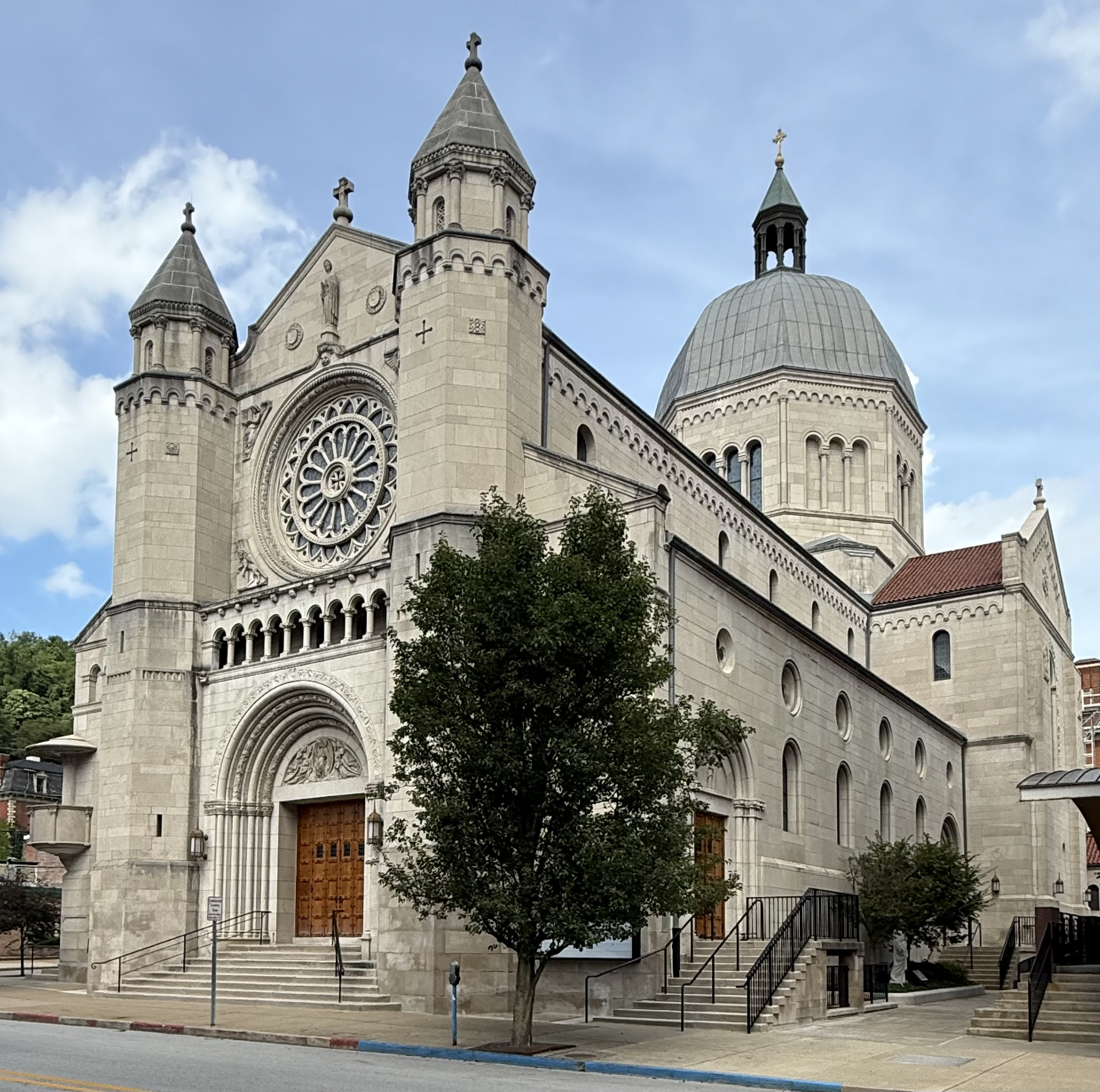
Cathedral of Saint Joseph, Wheeling, West Virginia (2025)

On February 22, 1922, Swint was appointed as auxiliary bishop of Wheeling and titular bishop of Sura by Pope Pius XI. He received his episcopal consecration on May 11, 1922, from Archbishop Michael Curley, with Bishops Denis J. O'Connell and Hugh Boyle serving as co-consecrators, at St. Joseph's Cathedral in Wheeling. Following the death of Donahue, Swint was named the fourth bishop of Wheeling by Pope Pius XI on December 11, 1922.

Nicknamed "God's Bricklayer," Swint established twenty-five parishes, seven missions, two hospitals, two nursing homes, the Sacred Heart Children's Home in Wheeling, and the diocesan chapter of Catholic Charities. He held the seventh (1923) and eighth (1933) diocesan synods.

Swint laid the cornerstone for a new cathedral in Wheeling in 1924, dedicating the Cathedral of Saint Joseph in 1926. He also invited the Franciscans of the Immaculate Conception, the Sisters of St. Joseph, and the Pallottine Missionary Sisters into the diocese. The Vatican named Swint as an assistant at the pontifical throne in 1929.

In 1948, Swint threatened to excommunicate any Catholic women from the diocese who participated in the state competition for the Miss America pageant. He called the pageant "pagan" and stated that if "nakedness" were removed from the pageant, it would "fall to pieces". Two women withdrew from competition, but one contestant, Mariruth Ford, ignored his ban and participated, winning the title of Miss West Virginia.

In July 1952, Swint condemned the planned opening of a Planned Parenthood clinic in Parkersburg, West Virginia, that would provide contraception services to women. He said it was part of a national plan by doctors to break the Catholic Church's ban on birth control. Swint was given the personal title of archbishop by the Vatican on March 12, 1954.

=== Death ===
John Swint died in Wheeling on November 23, 1962, at age 82.

== Publications ==
- The Moral Law (1933)
- The Parables of the Kingdom (1934)
- The Bread from Heaven (1935)
- Christ the Organizer of the Church (1936)
- Back to Christ (1940)
- Forgotten Truths (1940)
- The Sweetest Story Ever Told (1947)

Catholic Church titles
Preceded by Patrick James Donahue	Bishop of Wheeling; 1922—1962	Succeeded by Joseph Howard Hodges
