= Brady Gate, West Virginia =

Unincorporated community in West Virginia, United States

Brady Gate
- Unincorporated community
- Location within the state of West Virginia Brady Gate (the United States)
- Coordinates: 38°32′51″N 80°4′38″W
- Country: United States
- State: West Virginia
- County: Randolph
- Elevation: 2,884 ft (879 m)
- Time zone: UTC-5 (Eastern (EST))
  - Summer (DST): UTC-4 (EDT)
- GNIS ID: 1553962

Brady Gate is an unincorporated community in Randolph County, West Virginia, United States.
