= Weaver, West Virginia =

Weaver
- Unincorporated community
- Location within the state of West Virginia Weaver (the United States)
- Coordinates: 38°58′9″N 79°55′51″W
- Country: United States
- State: West Virginia
- County: Randolph
- Elevation: 1,936 ft (590 m)
- Time zone: UTC-5 (Eastern (EST))
  - Summer (DST): UTC-4 (EDT)
- GNIS ID: 1555929

Weaver is an unincorporated community in Randolph County, West Virginia, United States.

The community was named after Henry Weaver, a mining official.
