= Whyte, West Virginia =

Whyte
- Unincorporated community
- Location within the state of West Virginia Whyte (the United States)
- Coordinates: 38°59′20″N 79°49′53″W
- Country: United States
- State: West Virginia
- County: Randolph
- Elevation: 1,936 ft (590 m)
- Time zone: UTC-5 (Eastern (EST))
  - Summer (DST): UTC-4 (EDT)
- GNIS ID: 1553441

Whyte is an unincorporated community in Randolph County, West Virginia, United States.
