= Patrick James Donahue =

English-born prelate

His Excellency, The Right Reverend Patrick James Donahue
- Bishop of Wheeling
- Church: Roman Catholic Church
- See: Diocese of Wheeling
- In office: April 8, 1894—October 4, 1922
- Predecessor: John Joseph Kain
- Successor: John Joseph Swint

Orders
- Ordination: December 19, 1885 by James Gibbons
- Consecration: April 8, 1894 by James Gibbons

Personal details
- Born: April 15, 1849 Little Malvern, Worcestershire, England
- Died: October 4, 1922 (aged 73) Wheeling, West Virginia, USA
- Education: St. Gregory's College; George Washington University Law School; St. Mary's Seminary
- Motto: Caritas xte urge nos (The love of Christ compels us)

Patrick James Donahue (April 15, 1849 – October 4, 1922) was an English-born prelate of the Roman Catholic Church. He served as bishop of the Diocese of Wheeling in West Virginia from 1894 until his death in 1922.

== Biography ==
=== Early life ===
Patrick Donahue was born on April 15, 1849, in Little Malvern, Worcestershire, in the United Kingdom. He became a student at St. Michael's Priory in Hereford, England, at age 14 and entered St. Gregory's College near Bath, England two years later. After graduating in 1869, he taught English and mathematics.

In 1873, Donahue immigrated to the United States and settled in Washington, D.C. He enrolled at George Washington University Law School in Washington and was admitted to the bar in 1876. He then practiced for the next seven years. In 1883, after deciding to prepare for the priesthood, Donahue entered St. Mary's Seminary in Baltimore, Maryland.

=== Priesthood ===
Donahue was ordained to the priesthood in Baltimore for the Archdiocese of Baltimore by Archbishop James Gibbons on December 19, 1885. After his ordination, Donahue served as an assistant priest at St. John's Parish in Baltimore. He served as chancellor of the archdiocese from 1886 to 1891, and rector of Assumption of the Blessed Mary Cathedral in Baltimore from 1891 to 1894.

=== Bishop of Wheeling ===
On January 22, 1894, Donahue was appointed the third bishop of Wheeling by Pope Leo XIII. He received his episcopal consecration on April 8, 1894, at Assumption of the Blessed Virgin Mary Cathedral from Gibbons, with Bishops John Foley and Leo Haid serving as co-consecrators.

Donahue established 38 parishes, six missions, four hospitals, two monasteries, an orphanage and several schools in the diocese. He also established the first official diocesan periodical, The Church Calendar, in 1895 and held the sixth diocesan synod in 1899. The number of priests serving the diocese more than tripled and the number of Catholics increased from 20,000 to 62,000. For all these many achievements, he earned the nickname of the "Great Builder."

Donohue's friendship with New York philanthropist Sara Tracy resulted in a large cash donation to found Wheeling Jesuit University in Wheeling. Tracy and Donahue had met on a transatlantic voyage in 1899 and became friends over a long game of chess. At the end of the trip, Tracy gave Donahue $5,000 to use in his diocese. The start of several donations, Tracy bequeathed her estate to Donahue in 1905.

=== Death ===
Patrick Donahue died on October 4, 1922, in Wheeling from heart disease at age 72.

Catholic Church titles
Preceded by John Joseph Kain	Bishop of Wheeling; 1894—1922	Succeeded by John Joseph Swint
