= USS Fahrion =

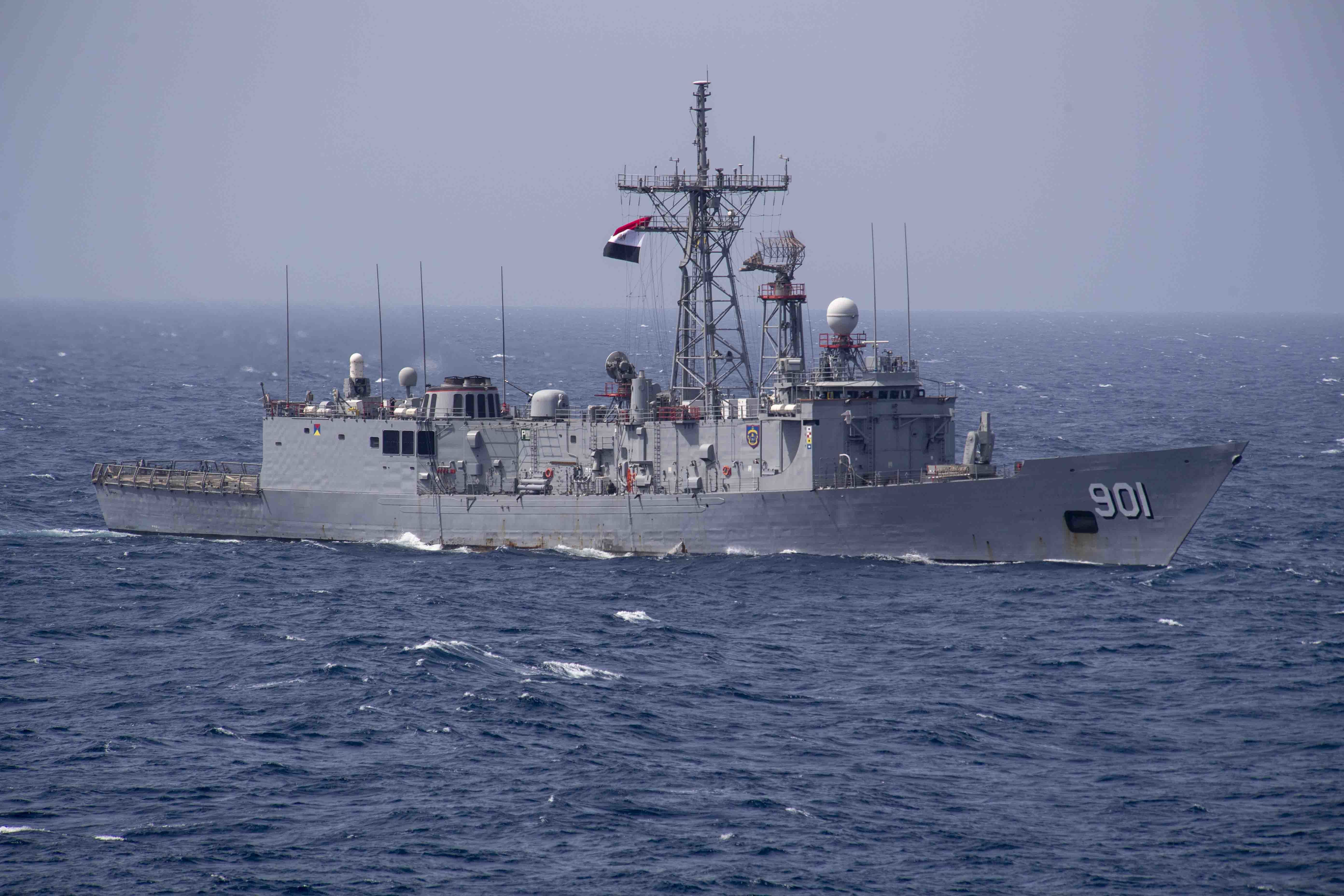
- ENS Sharm El-Sheik in the Red Sea in March 2021

History

United States
- Name: Fahrion
- Namesake: Admiral Frank George Fahrion (1894–1970)
- Ordered: 28 February 1977
- Builder: Todd Pacific Shipyards, Seattle, Washington
- Laid down: 1 December 1978
- Launched: 24 August 1979
- Sponsored by: Mrs. Kathleen Dwyer Fahrion, Admiral Fahrion's widow
- Acquired: 29 December 1981
- Commissioned: 16 January 1982
- Decommissioned: 31 March 1998
- Stricken: 31 March 1998
- Home port: Mayport, Florida (former)
- Identification: Hull symbol:FFG-22; Code letters:NFGF
- Motto: "Tenacity"
- Fate: transferred to Egyptian Navy, 31 March 1998
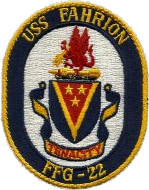
- Badge

Egypt
- Name: Sharm El-Sheik
- Namesake: City of Sharm El-Sheik
- Acquired: 31 March 1998
- Identification: F901
- Status: in active service, as of 2018

General characteristics
- Class & type: Oliver Hazard Perry-class frigate
- Displacement: 4,100 long tons (4,200 t), full load
- Length: 445 feet (136 m), overall
- Beam: 45 feet (14 m)
- Draft: 22 feet (6.7 m)
- Propulsion: 2 × General Electric LM2500-30 gas turbines generating 41,000 shp (31 MW) through a single shaft and variable pitch propeller; 2 × Auxiliary Propulsion Units, 350 hp (260 kW) retractable electric azimuth thrusters for maneuvering and docking.
- Speed: over 29 knots (54 km/h)
- Range: 5,000 nautical miles at 18 knots (9,300 km at 33 km/h)
- Complement: 15 officers and 190 enlisted, plus SH-60 LAMPS detachment of roughly six officer pilots and 15 enlisted maintainers
- Sensors & processing systems: AN/SPS-49 air-search radar; AN/SPS-55 surface-search radar; CAS and STIR fire-control radar; AN/SQS-56 sonar.
- Electronic warfare & decoys: AN/SLQ-32
- Armament: As built: 1 × OTO Melara Mk 75 76 mm/62 caliber naval gun; 2 × Mk 32 triple-tube (324 mm) launchers for Mark 46 torpedoes; 1 × Vulcan Phalanx CIWS; 4 × .50-cal (12.7 mm) machine guns.; 1 × Mk 13 Mod 4 single-arm launcher for Harpoon anti-ship missiles and SM-1MR Standard anti-ship/air missiles (40 round magazine); Note: As of 2004, Mk 13 systems removed from all active US vessels of this class.
- Aircraft carried: 1 × SH-2F LAMPS I

USS Fahrion (FFG-22), fourteenth ship of the Oliver Hazard Perry-class of guided-missile frigates, was named for Admiral Frank George Fahrion (1894–1970).

Ordered from Todd Pacific, Seattle, WA on 28 February 1977 as part of the FY77 program, Fahrion was laid down on 1 December 1978, launched on 24 August 1979, and commissioned on 16 January 1982. Transferred to Egypt on 15 March 1998 as ENS Sharm El-Sheik (F901), she was formally decommissioned and stricken on 31 March 1998. As of March 2021, Sharm El-Sheik remained in active service with the Egyptian Navy.

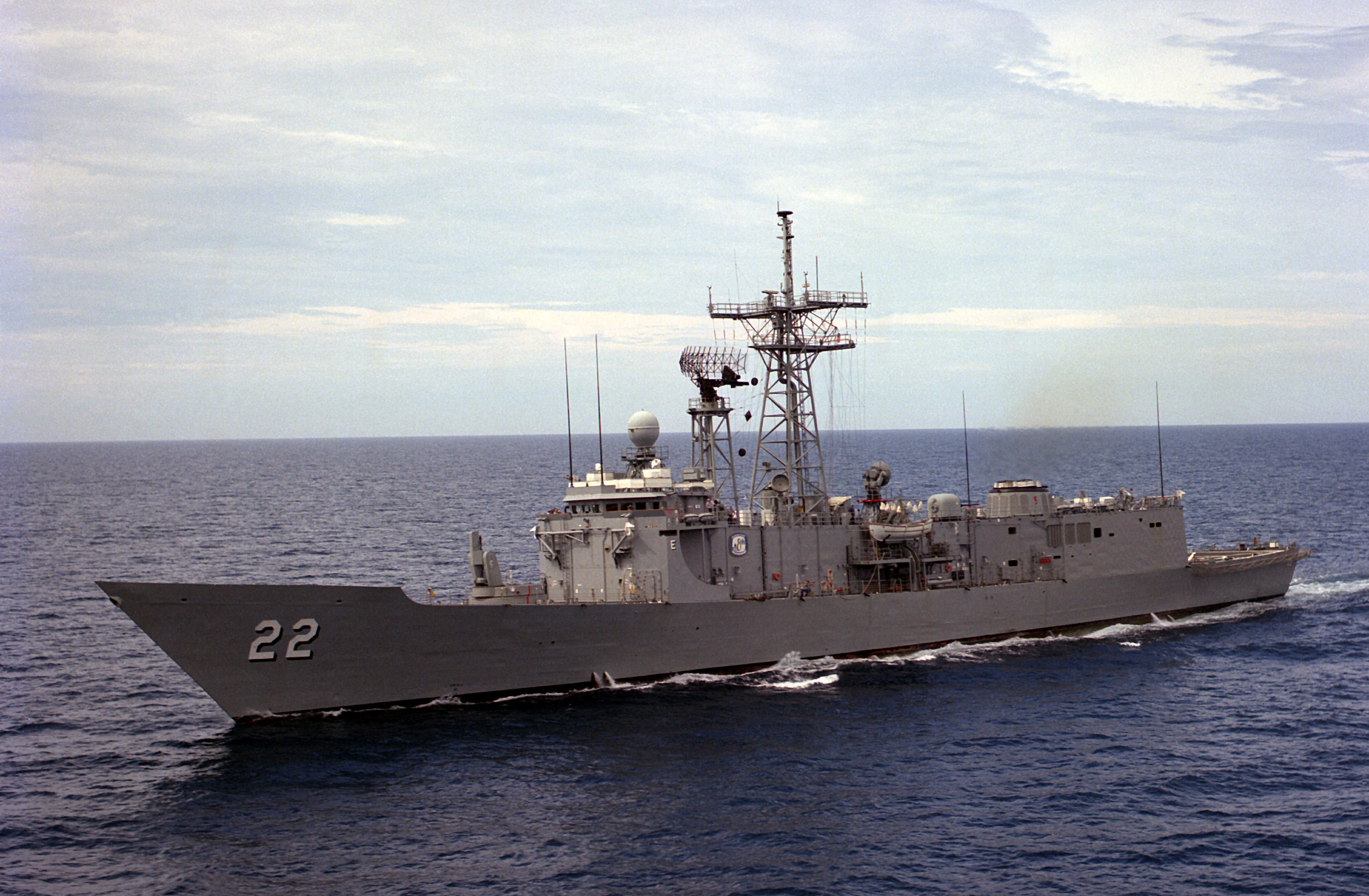
USS Fahrion in American service in 1985.

Fahrion (FFG-22) was the first ship of that name in the US Navy.

== Operations and Missions ==
- Multinational Peacekeeping Force Beirut Lebanon - Oct. 1983 - March 1984
- Operation Earnest Will -MEF 2–86
- Operation Earnest Will -MEF 2–88 (May 1988 – Sept 1988)
- Baltops 89 (June 1989 – Sept 1989)
- Great Lakes Cruise (June 1990 – September 1990)
- Operation Abel Vigil (June 1994 – August 1994)
- UNITAS 36–95 (27 June 1995-December 1995)
- Great Lakes Cruise (June 1997 – September 1997)
