= Norton, West Virginia =

- Unincorporated community
- Location within West Virginia Location within the United States
- Coordinates: 38°55′54″N 79°57′56″W
- Country: United States
- State: West Virginia
- County: Randolph
- Elevation: 1,982 ft (604 m)

Population
  - Total: 281
- Time zone: UTC-5 (Eastern (EST))
  - Summer (DST): UTC-4 (EDT)
- ZIP code: 26285
- Area codes: 304 & 681
- GNIS feature ID: 1544239

Norton is an unincorporated community in Randolph County, West Virginia, United States. Norton is 6.5 miles (10.5 km) west of Elkins, at the junction of County Route 151 and Corridor H. Norton had a post office, which closed on November 12, 2011. It is a former coal town operated by the West Virginia Coal and Coke Company from the early 1900s until the late 1950s. Besides the mine, the town was once home to a company store, a company bank, and the Norton Grade School. The denominationally unaffiliated Norton Community Church still serves the town.
