= Pumpkintown, West Virginia =

Pumpkintown
- Unincorporated community
- Location within the state of West Virginia Pumpkintown (the United States)
- Coordinates: 38°53′34″N 80°1′27″W
- Country: United States
- State: West Virginia
- County: Randolph
- Elevation: 2,523 ft (769 m)
- Time zone: UTC-5 (Eastern (EST))
  - Summer (DST): UTC-4 (EDT)
- GNIS ID: 1545314

Pumpkintown is an unincorporated community in Randolph County, West Virginia, United States.
