= Spangler, West Virginia =

Spangler
- Unincorporated community
- Location within the state of West Virginia Spangler (the United States)
- Coordinates: 38°36′22″N 80°1′25″W
- Country: United States
- State: West Virginia
- County: Randolph
- Elevation: 2,185 ft (666 m)
- Time zone: UTC-5 (Eastern (EST))
  - Summer (DST): UTC-4 (EDT)
- GNIS ID: 1555677

Spangler is an unincorporated community in Randolph County, West Virginia, United States.

== Climate ==
The climate in this area has mild differences between highs and lows, and there is adequate rainfall year-round. According to the Köppen Climate Classification system, Spangler has a marine west coast climate, abbreviated "Cfb" on climate maps.
