= Gary Spangler =

- Occupation: Music executive
- Years active: 1997 – present
- Organization: Republic Records

Gary Spangler is an American music executive and the executive vice president of Republic Records, a division of Universal Music Group.

== Career ==
Spangler began his career in the music industry at age 17 in 1996 as a DJ working in Santa Cruz, California.

From 1997 to 2006, he worked at music promotion company Lawman Promotions in San Francisco. He later became vice president of the company. He also worked for KYLD, based in the same city.

In 2006, he joined Republic Records as vice president of crossover promotion, where he created campaigns for Drake, Taylor Swift, and Lil Wayne, among others. In 2012, he was named senior vice president promotion & operations. He became executive vice president of promotion in 2016, overseeing promotion and strategy for Republic Records and Island Records. In 2021, he was promoted to executive vice president of Republic.

== Notable features ==
In 2015, he was featured on Billboard's Forty Under Forty Power Players list. He appeared on Variety's 2018 Hitmakers List for his work promoting several Post Malone and Drake songs, and again in 2019 for his work on Ariana Grande's singles "7 Rings" and "Thank U, Next" as well as Shawn Mendes' and Camila Cabello's "Senorita". In 2020, he was named to Variety's Hitmakers Impact List. Billboard named him Executive of the Week in February 2021 for the pop radio promotion of Ariana Grande and The Weeknd.

== Philanthropy ==
As of 2018, Spangler is a member of the Ryan Seacrest Foundation's advisory board.
