= Wilma Lee Cooper =

American country music entertainer (1921–2011)

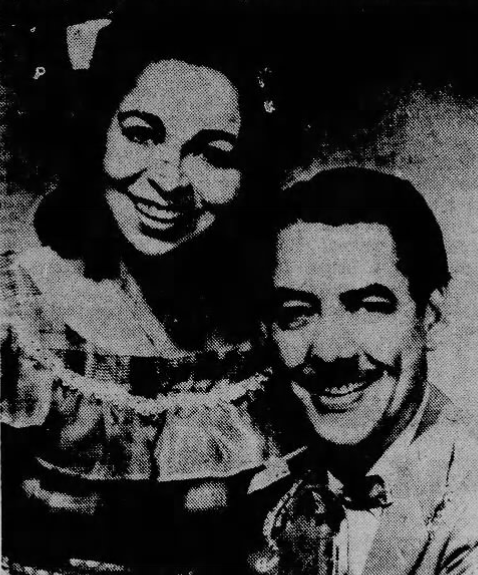
- Cooper (left) with Stoney Cooper in 1966

Background information
- Also known as: Wilma Cooper
- Born: Wilma Lee Leary or Willma Leigh Leary; February 7, 1921; Valley Head, West Virginia, U.S.
- Died: September 13, 2011 (aged 90); Sweetwater, Tennessee, U.S.
- Genre: Country
- Occupations: Musician, guitarist, singer
- Instruments: Guitar
- Years active: 1938–2001
- Labels: Library of Congress, Hickory
- Formerly of: Stoney Cooper

Wilma Lee Leary (February 7, 1921 – September 13, 2011), known professionally as Wilma Lee Cooper, was an American country music entertainer. She was a guitarist, banjo player and vocalist, and was given the title of "First Lady of Bluegrass" by the Smithsonian Institution in 1974. In 1994 She was awarded the Distinguished Achievement Award from the IBMA. She was posthumously inducted into the International Bluegrass Music Hall of Fame in 2023.

== Biography ==
Leary, according to the 1930 U.S. Census, was born Willma Leigh Leary in Valley Head, West Virginia whose mother was a schoolteacher and father who was a coal miner. Wilma's mother played pump organ. She had two siblings, Jerry and Peggy. She began singing at the age of five.

She sang in her youth with her family's gospel music group, The Leary Family, which included her parents and sisters. They recorded for the Library Of Congress in 1938. That year, they were also recognized at the National Folk Festival in Washington, D.C., having been chosen through a competition to represent the state of West Virginia.

In 1941, Leary married fiddler and vocalist Dale T. "Stoney" Cooper, who was a musical accompanist for the Leary Family, and the duo formed their own group; Wilma Lee & Stoney Cooper and the Clinch Mountain Clan. There were many similarities between Wilma's recordings and Roy Acuff. This is seen in the use Acuff's repertory and prominent featuring of the dobro on her recordings. 16 tracks were recorded during her first time in the studio, five of which were also previously recorded by Acuff.

They were regulars for ten years on Wheeling, West Virginia's WWVA-AM's rival to the Grand Ole Opry, WWVA Jamboree, beginning in 1947 before joining the Opry in 1957. They were hired to do a series of transcribed shows to be aired across the country, a project that would considerably increase their reach and help them gain a large following.

Wilma Lee and Stoney Cooper had remarkable record success in the late 1950s and early 1960s on Hickory Records given both their traditional country sound (which has rarely been as commercially successful) and the damage rock-n-roll was doing to country music's popularity at the time. They scored seven hit records between 1956 and 1961, with four top ten hits on Billboard charts, notably "Big Midnight Special" and "There's a Big Wheel". They remained connected to the Leary Family tradition as well, recording popular gospel songs like "The Tramp on the Street" and "Walking My Lord Up Calvary's Hill".

Stoney Cooper died in 1977 but Wilma Lee stayed on the Opry as a solo star and on occasion recorded an album for a bluegrass record label. In 2001 she suffered a stroke while performing on the Opry stage which ended her career, but Cooper defied doctors who said she would never walk again and eventually returned to the Opry to greet and thank the crowds.

The Cooper's daughter, Carol Lee Cooper, was the lead singer for the Grand Ole Opry's backup vocal group, The Carol Lee Singers until she announced her retirement live on the Opry on March 24, 2012.

Wilma Lee Cooper died from natural causes on September 13, 2011, at her home in Sweetwater, Tennessee. She had been a member of the Opry since 1957. She was 90 years old. Her last solo performance on the Opry was at the Ryman Auditorium on February 24, 2001. Wilma Lee joined the Opry cast at the grand re-opening of the Opry House on September 28, 2010, for a group sing-along.

== Discography ==
=== Singles with Stoney Cooper ===
Year	Single	US Country	US Cash Box Country
1956	"Cheated Too"	14	—
1958	"Come Walk with Me" (with Carolee And The Clinch Mtn. Clan)	4	11
1959	"Big Midnight Special"	4	4
1959	"There's a Big Wheel"	3	3
1960	"Johnny, My Love (Grandma's Diary)"	17	12
1960	"This Ole House"	16	23
1961	"Wreck on the Highway"	8	27

LP Gusto Records PO-242 (1975) Wilma Lee and Stoney Cooper – Walking my Lord up Calvary's Hill
