= Mabie (surname) =

Mabie is a surname. Notable people with the surname include:

- Benjamin H. Mabie, American politician
- Don Mabie (born 1947), Canadian artist
- Hamilton Wright Mabie (1846–1916), American essayist, editor, critic, and lecturer
