= Wreck on the Highway (1938 song) =

Song performed by Roy Acuff

"Wreck on the Highway" is a classic bluegrass song most commonly associated with Roy Acuff.

"Wreck on the Highway" tells the story of an automobile accident, with implication of alcohol abuse ("whiskey and blood run together") and moral religious language ("Their soul has been called by the Master... But I didn't hear nobody pray... It'll be too late if tomorrow you'll fall by a crash by the way...And you can't hear nobody pray").

"Wreck on the Highway" was written in 1937 by Dorsey Dixon after a serious accident near Rockingham, North Carolina and was first recorded (under the title "Didn't Hear Nobody Pray") in Charlotte, North Carolina in 1938.

It was recorded in 1940 by the Chicago-based country duo Karl and Harty (Karl Davis and Harty Taylor). The best-known version was recorded by Roy Acuff And His Smoky Mountain Boys in Hollywood in 1942.

Bill Haley and the 4 Aces of Western Swing recorded a cover in 1949 that went unreleased until the 1977 LP Golden Country Origins. Wilma Lee Cooper and her husband Stoney Cooper released a version as the B side of their 1961 single "Night After Night". George Jones and Gene Pitney recorded a version (under the name "George and Gene"), released as a single in 1965, Hank Locklin recorded the song for his 1962 album A Tribute to Roy Acuff, King of Country Music, and the Louvin Brothers also recorded the song.

The Nitty Gritty Dirt Band included the song on their 1972 album Will the Circle be Unbroken; Roy Acuff took the lead vocal. Ricky Skaggs and The Whites recorded the song on their 2007 album Salt of the Earth, and Merle Haggard and Chester Smith released a duet of the song on their country-gospel album California Blend. And many other country artists have performed and recorded the song.

According to both Dave Marsh and Patrick Humphries, Bruce Springsteen's song "Wreck on the Highway" on his 1980 album The River was directly inspired by Dorsey Dixon's song. The two songs have the same title, same theme (the singer coming across a fatal highway crash), and same mood (gloomy, reflective), although the lyrics and melodies are altogether different.
