= Cassity Fork =

Stream in West Virginia, United States

Location
- Country: United States
- State: West Virginia

Physical characteristics
- Source
  - coordinates: 38°49′36″N 80°02′13″W

Cassity Fork is a stream in the U.S. state of West Virginia.

Cassity Fork was named in honor of one Mr. Cassidy, a pioneer settler.

== See also ==
- List of rivers of West Virginia
