= Frank G. Fahrion =

United States Navy admiral (1894–1970)

Frank George Fahrion
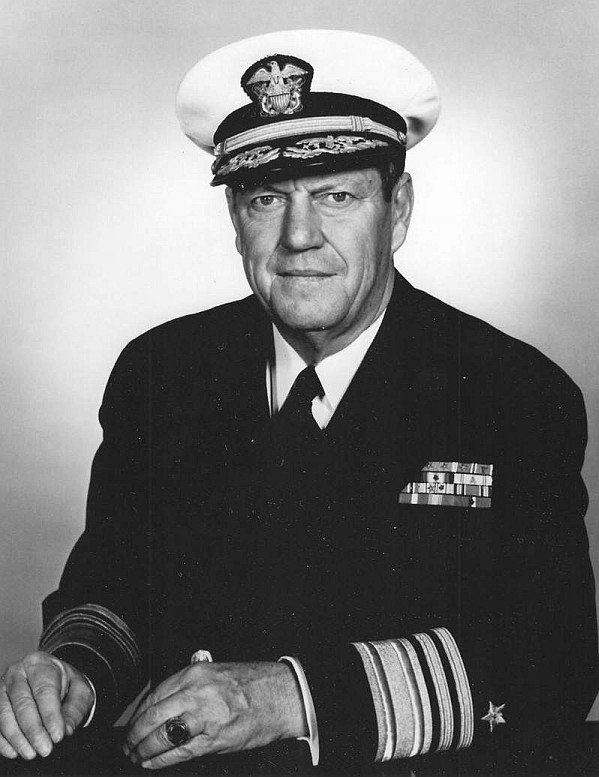
- Admiral Frank G. Fahrion
- Born: 17 April 1894; Pickens, West Virginia, US
- Died: 16 January 1970 (aged 75); La Jolla, California, US
- Burial place: Arlington National Cemetery
- Military career
- Allegiance: United States
- Branch: United States Navy
- Service years: 1917–1956
- Rank: Admiral
- Commands: USS North Carolina
- Conflicts: World War II
- Awards: Legion of Merit (3); Bronze Star Medal (2)

Frank George Fahrion (17 April 1894 – 16 January 1970) was a four star Admiral in the United States Navy. He was the eponym of the frigate USS Fahrion (FFG-22).

== Biography ==
Fahrion was born on 17 April 1894 in Pickens, West Virginia. He graduated from the United States Naval Academy in 1917 and served on a succession of destroyers. Prior to the attack on Pearl Harbor, he led a destroyer division which was escorting convoys to Iceland and the Mid-Atlantic rendezvous with British escorts. In October 1941, he embarked on the destroyer USS Anderson.

=== World War II ===
During World War II, Fahrion was the Destroyer Screen Commander for the Yorktown aircraft carrier task force in the early central Pacific raids on the Gilbert Islands. He was awarded the Legion of Merit for his service as the chief of staff to Commander North Pacific Force. He earned a Gold Star in lieu of a second Legion of Merit for the skillful direction, research development and manufacturing phases of the successful torpedo program, whilst commanding the Naval Torpedo Station in Newport, Rhode Island from February 1943 to July 1944. The Bronze Star Medal for Valor was won by Fahrion as the commanding officer of the battleship USS North Carolina during fleet raids ranging from the Philippines to Iwo Jima and Okinawa. He was advanced to flag rank in January 1945. In recognition of his skillful and intensive direct naval gunfire support missions whilst commanding Cruiser Division Four throughout the Okinawa Campaign, Admiral Fahrion received a Gold Star in lieu of a second Bronze Star Medal.

After World War II ended, Admiral Fahrion was awarded a Gold Star in lieu of a third Legion of Merit for superbly organizing and directing the target and salvage units of the Joint Task Force One during "Operation Crossroads," the atomic bomb tests of July 1946 at Bikini Atoll, Marshall Islands. His flagship was USS Fall River.

=== Post World War II ===
Before retiring, Fahrion served as the inspector general, Pacific and U.S. Pacific Fleet: Commander Destroyers, U.S. Pacific Fleet (1946–1948), and as the superintendent of the Naval Gun Factory, Washington, D.C. In July 1950, he assumed command of the Destroyer Force, U.S. Atlantic Fleet. Finally, from January 1952 to his retirement on 1 May 1956, he served as the Commander Amphibious Force, U.S. Atlantic Fleet.

After retiring from the Navy, Fahrion settled with his wife in La Jolla, California, where he died on 16 January 1970. He was buried at Arlington National Cemetery.
