= Jimtown, Harrison County, West Virginia =

- Unincorporated community
- Location within West Virginia Location within the United States
- Coordinates: 39°23′55″N 80°24′12″W
- Country: United States
- State: West Virginia
- County: Harrison
- Time zone: UTC-5 (Eastern (EST))
  - Summer (DST): UTC-4 (EDT)
- GNIS feature ID: 1549761

Jimtown is an unincorporated community on Jones Creek in Harrison County, West Virginia, United States. Jimtown lies along County Route 6.
