= Sullivan, Randolph County, West Virginia =

Sullivan, West Virginia
- Unincorporated community
- Location within West Virginia Location within the United States
- Coordinates: 38°54′26″N 79°52′11″W
- Country: United States
- State: West Virginia
- County: Randolph
- Elevation: 1,962 ft (598 m)
- Time zone: UTC-5 (Eastern (EST))
  - Summer (DST): UTC-4 (EDT)
- Area codes: 304 & 681
- GNIS feature ID: 1555740

Sullivan is an unincorporated community in Randolph County, West Virginia, United States. Sullivan is 2 miles (3.2 km) southwest of downtown Elkins.
