= Arnold Hill, West Virginia =

Unincorporated community in West Virginia, United States

- Unincorporated community
- Location within West Virginia Location within the United States
- Coordinates: 38°53′0″N 79°51′49″W
- Country: United States
- State: West Virginia
- County: Randolph
- Elevation: 1,942 ft (592 m)
- Time zone: UTC-5 (Eastern (EST))
  - Summer (DST): UTC-4 (EDT)
- GNIS ID: 1553750

Arnold Hill is an unincorporated community in Randolph County, West Virginia, United States.
