= Stoney Cooper =

American musician

Background information
- Birth name: Dale Troy Cooper
- Born: October 16, 1918; Harman, West Virginia, U.S.
- Died: March 22, 1977 (aged 58)
- Genres: Country
- Occupation: Singer
- Instrument(s): Fiddle, guitar
- Years active: 1947–1969
- Labels: Hickory
- Formerly of: Wilma Lee Cooper

Dale Troy Cooper (October 16, 1918 – March 22, 1977), known professionally as Stoney Cooper, was an American country star and member of the Grand Ole Opry. He played the fiddle and the guitar.

== Biography ==
Cooper was the son of Kenny and Stella (Raines) Cooper of Harman, West Virginia, United States. His family was among the first settlers of Randolph and Pendleton counties, and these roots in the Appalachian mountains had an impact upon his music.

While in high school, Cooper was a member of the Leary Family Singers. In 1939, he married Wilma Lee Leary. They became Wilma Lee and Stoney Cooper, one of the biggest country music acts of the 1940s through the 1960s. They had one daughter, Carol Lee Cooper.

In 1947, they were cast members of WWVA Jamboree in Wheeling, West Virginia until 1957. Their band was called The Clinch Mountain Clan. In 1948, Cooper signed a recording contract with Columbia with the help of Fred Rose that lasted to 1955. In 1954, Cooper joined the Grand Ole Opry.

He also recorded for Rich-R-Tone, Hickory Records and Decca.

== Death ==
In 1973, Stoney's health began to fail; he suffered a series of heart attacks and spent long periods in the hospital. Finally, he suffered a heart attack on February 4, 1977, from which he died in the intensive care unit of a Nashville hospital on March 22, 1977.

== Discography ==
=== Singles with Wilma Lee Cooper ===
Year	Single	US Country
1956	"Cheated Too"	14
1958	"Come Walk with Me" (with Carol Lee)	4
1959	"Big Midnight Special"	4
1959	"There's a Big Wheel"	3
1960	"Johnny, My Love (Grandma's Diary)"	17
1960	"This Ole House"	16
1961	"Wreck on the Highway"	8

== Bibliography ==
- The Country Music Encyclopedia, Melvin Shestack. 1974, KBO Publishers, Inc., ISBN 978-0690004427
- Country Music, U.S.A., Bill C. Malone. 1985, University of Texas Press, ISBN 978-0-292-72329-0
