= Womelsdorf (Coalton), West Virginia =

- Town
- Location of Womelsdorf (Coalton) in Randolph County, West Virginia.
- Coordinates: 38°53′49″N 79°57′50″W
- Country: United States
- State: West Virginia
- County: Randolph

Area
  - Total: 0.41 sq mi (1.07 km^{2})
  - Land: 0.41 sq mi (1.07 km^{2})
  - Water: 0 sq mi (0.00 km^{2})
- Elevation: 2,159 ft (658 m)

Population (2020)
  - Total: 189
  - Estimate (2021): 189
  - Density: 579.5/sq mi (223.73/km^{2})
- Time zone: UTC-5 (Eastern (EST))
  - Summer (DST): UTC-4 (EDT)
- ZIP code: 26257
- Area code: 304
- FIPS code: 54-88324
- GNIS feature ID: 2391491

Womelsdorf (Coalton) is a town in Randolph County, West Virginia, United States. The population was 190 at the 2020 census.

Womelsdorf was the name of a mining official; the variant name of Coalton was given on account of local mining operations.

== Geography ==
Womelsdorf (Coalton) is located at 38°53′49″N 79°57′50″W (38.896849, -79.963780).

According to the United States Census Bureau, the town has a total area of 0.41 square miles (1.06 km^{2}), all land.

== Demographics ==
Historical population
Census	Pop.	Note	%±
1910	665		—
1920	833		25.3%
1930	373		−55.2%
1940	417		11.8%
1950	407		−2.4%
1960	354		−13.0%
1970	234		−33.9%
1980	306		30.8%
1990	277		−9.5%
2000	247		−10.8%
2010	250		1.2%
2020	189		−24.4%
2021 (est.)	189	Steady	0.0%
U.S. Decennial Census

=== 2010 census ===
At the 2010 census there were 250 people, 97 households, and 68 families living in the town. The population density was 609.8 inhabitants per square mile (235.4/km^{2}). There were 111 housing units at an average density of 270.7 per square mile (104.5/km^{2}). The racial makeup of the town was 99.4% White, 0.4% Native American. Of the 97 households 28.9% had children under the age of 18 living with them, 50.5% were married couples living together, 15.5% had a female householder with no husband present, 4.1% had a male householder with no wife present, and 29.9% were non-families. 25.8% of households were one person and 17.6% were one person aged 65 or older. The average household size was 2.58 and the average family size was 3.10.

The median age in the town was 47 years. 20.4% of residents were under the age of 18; 7.2% were between the ages of 18 and 24; 18% were from 25 to 44; 34.4% were from 45 to 64; and 20% were 65 or older. The gender makeup of the town was 48.0% male and 52.0% female.

=== 2000 census ===
At the 2000 census there were 247 people, 100 households, and 70 families living in the town. The population density was 577.4 inhabitants per square mile (221.8/km^{2}). There were 109 housing units at an average density of 254.8 per square mile (97.9/km^{2}). The racial makeup of the town was 99.19% White, 0.40% Native American, and 0.40% from two or more races. Of the 100 households 30.0% had children under the age of 18 living with them, 55.0% were married couples living together, 12.0% had a female householder with no husband present, and 30.0% were non-families. 27.0% of households were one person and 13.0% were one person aged 65 or older. The average household size was 2.47 and the average family size was 3.03.

The age distribution was 22.7% under the age of 18, 6.5% from 18 to 24, 25.5% from 25 to 44, 30.4% from 45 to 64, and 15.0% 65 or older. The median age was 40 years. For every 100 females, there were 107.6 males. For every 100 females age 18 and over, there were 101.1 males.

The median household income was $28,462 and the median family income was $36,875. Males had a median income of $27,188 versus $15,469 for females. The per capita income for the town was $13,997. About 7.8% of families and 10.3% of the population were below the poverty line, including 14.3% of those under the age of eighteen and 11.3% of those sixty five or over.
