= List of Phi Chi chapters =

Phi Chi, one of the oldest medical fraternities in the world, was established on March 5, 1905. It was formed by the merger of two professional medical fraternities with the same name. Phi Chi Society (Phi Chi East) was founded on March 31, 1889, at the University of Vermont. Phi Chi Medical Fraternity (Phi Chi South) was founded on October 26, 1894, at the Louisville Medical College. These two organizations did not know they shared a similar name when they were founded.

On March 5, 1905, in Burlington, Vermont, Phi Chi Society and Phi Chi Medical Fraternity, Inc., were consolidated taking the name Phi Chi Medical Fraternity, Inc. Phi Chi East had five active chapters at the time of the merger. Phi Chi South had eighteen active chapters at the time of the merger. Phi Chi also merged with the Pi Mu Honor Society on October 7, 1922, acquiring a new chapter and absorbing six chapters.

== Chapters ==
When the Phi Chi Society and Phi Chi Medical Fraternity combined in 1905, it was decided that when the names of any two chapters conflicted, the chapter with precedence would retain its single-letter name and the chapter with the later chapter date would duplicate its name. The result was retaining the Alpha chapter (1889) at the University of Vermont as named, and renaming the former Alpha chapter of Louisville (1894) as Alpha Alpha chapter, and so forth.

Following is a list of chapters. Active chapters are indicated in bold. Inactive chapters are in italics.

Chapter	Charter date and range	Institution	Location	Status	Ref.
Alpha	March 31, 1889 – 1967	University of Vermont College of Medicine	Burlington, Vermont	Inactive	(Note: Chapter was originally part of the Phi Chi Society (Phi Chi East).)
Alpha Alpha	October 26, 1894 – 1908	Louisville Medical College	Louisville, Kentucky	Inactive	(Note: Chapter was originally part of Phi Chi Medical Fraternity (Phi Chi South).) (Note: Alpha Alpha incorporates Alpha, Beta, Gamma, Delta, and Epsilon of Phi Chi Southern.)
Beta Beta (see Pi Sigma)	November 15, 1895 –1913	Baltimore Medical College, University of Maryland	Baltimore, Maryland	Consolidated	(Note: Merged with Pi Sigma chapter.)
Beta First (see Gamma)	December 12, 1896 – 1909	Kentucky School of Medicine	Louisville, Kentucky	Consolidated, Reissued	(Note: Merged with Gamma chapter when the University of Louisville absorbed the medical school.)
Gamma First (see Gamma Epsilon)	December 19, 1896 – 1907	University of Louisville	Louisville, Kentucky	Consolidated, Reissued	(Note: Gamma and Epsilon consolidated to form Gamma Epsilon when Louisville and Kentucky combined their medical schools.)
Delta First	February 26, 1897 – 1908	Hospital College of Medicine	Louisville, Kentucky	Reissued	(Note: Chapter closed when the college combined with Louisville Medical College.)
Epsilon First (see Gamma Epsilon)	March 24, 1899 – 1907	Kentucky University Medical Department	Lexington, Kentucky	Consolidated, Reissued	
Theta	March 24, 1899 – 1913	University College of Medicine	Richmond, Virginia	Consolidated	(Note: Theta and Eta consolidated to form Theta Eta chapter when their two institution merged.)
Gamma Gamma	March 13, 1900 – June 30, 1921	Bowdoin Medical College (Medical College of Maine)	Brunswick, Maine	Inactive	(Note: Chapter went inactive when the medical college closed.)
Delta Delta (see Beta Delta)	March 22, 1902 – 1915	University College of Physicians and Surgeons	Baltimore, Maryland	Consolidated	(Note: Merged with Beta Delta chapter.)
Eta Second	February 21, 1902 – 1913	Medical College of Virginia	Richmond, Virginia	Consolidated	
Kappa	February 21, 1902 – 1971	Georgetown University School of Medicine	Washington, D.C.	Inactive	
**Omicron**	December 20, 1902	Tulane University of Louisiana School of Medicine	New Orleans, Louisiana	Active	
Theta Theta (see Pi Sigma)	February 16, 1903 – 1907	Maryland Medical College	Baltimore, Maryland	Consolidated	(Note: Merged with Pi Sigma chapter.)
Mu	February 28, 1903 – 1975	Purdue University School of Medicine	Indianapolis, Indiana	Consolidated	(Note: Chapter was originally chartered at Indiana University.)
Nu (see Iota)	March 5, 1903 – June 1, 1913	Birmingham Medical College	Tuscaloosa, Alabama	Consolidated	(Note: Merged with Iota chapter when the medical college became a post-grad department of the University of Alabama in 1913.)
**Zeta**	April 29, 1903	University of Texas Medical Branch	Galveston, Texas	Active	
**Chi**	December 9, 1903	Sidney Kimmel Medical College	Philadelphia, Pennsylvania	Active	
Iota	February 10, 1904 – 19xx ?; December 29, 1921 – 1963	University of Alabama School of Medicine	Birmingham, Alabama	Inactive	
Phi	February 17, 1904 – 1978	George Washington University Medical School	Washington, D.C.	Inactive	
Lambda	March 1, 1905 – June 1, 1911	University of Pittsburgh School of Medicine	Pittsburgh, Pennsylvania	Inactive	(Note: Chapter was instituted on February 10, 1905, and was chartered in March. It surrendered its charter in June 1911.)
Pi	March 1, 1905 – 1976	Vanderbilt University School of Medicine	Nashville, Tennessee	Inactive	(Note: Chapter was instituted on February 21, 1905, and was chartered in March. It merged with the Lambda chapter of Pi Mu Honor Society with the national merger of the two organizations in 1922.)
Rho	March 1, 1905 – 1944	Rush Medical College	Chicago, Illinois	Inactive	(Note: Chapter went defunct when college operations were suspended during World War II.)
Sigma (see Upsilon)	March 1, 1905 – 1973	Emory University School of Medicine	Atlanta, Georgia	Inactive	(Note: Chapter was chartered at the College of Physicians & Surgeons, Atlanta. It merged with Upsilon in 1913 when the college merged with the Atlanta School of Medicine. In 1917, the Atlanta School of Medicine merged with the Emory University School of Medicine.)
Sigma Theta	March 1, 1905 – 1965	University of North Carolina School of Medicine	Chapel Hill, North Carolina	Inactive	
Tau (see Sigma Kappa)	March 1, 1905 – June 1, 1924	Medical College of the State of South Carolina	Charleston, South Carolina	Reestablished	(Note: Chapter was forced to close because of anti-fraternity policies on campus. It was revived as Sigma Kappa.)
**Psi**	March 1, 1905	University of Michigan Medical School	Ann Arbor, Michigan	Active	
Upsilon (see Sigma)	February 8, 1906 – 1917	Atlanta School of Medicine	Atlanta, Georgia	Consolidated	(Note: Consolidated with the Sigma chapter when the school of medicine merged with the College of Physicians & Surgeons.)
Alpha Theta	February 8, 1906 – 1941	Western Reserve University	Cleveland, Ohio	Inactive	(Note: Chapter was instituted on October 3, 1906)
Sigma Mu Chi	February 8, 1906 – June 1, 1910	Chattanooga Medical College	Chattanooga, Tennessee	Inactive	(Note: Chapter closed when the medical college closed.)
Gamma Epsilon (see Gamma and Epsilon)	1907 – 1909	University of Kentucky	Lexington, Kentucky	Inactive	
Pi Sigma (see Beta Delta)	January 1, 1907 – 1915	University of Maryland	College Park, Maryland	Consolidated	(Note: Chapter consolidated with Beta Delta chapter.)
Xi First	January 1, 1907 – December 10, 1919	Texas Christian University	Fort Worth, Texas	Moved	(Note: The Xi chapter's charter was transferred from Texas Christian to Baylor.)
Phi Sigma	January 1, 1907 – 1973; 1985–1989	Stritch School of Medicine	Chicago, Illinois	Inactive	
Chi Theta (see Upsilon Pi)	January 1, 1907 – October 1, 1917	Medico-Chirurgical College of Philadelphia	Philadelphia, Pennsylvania	Consolidated	(Note: Chapter consolidated with Upsilon Pi chapter when U Penn absorbed Medico-Chirurgical.)
Alpha Delta	1908–1909	Louisville and Hospital College	Louisville, Kentucky	Inactive	(Note: Chapter closed when the University of Louisville absorbed the college.)
Kappa Psi (see Phi Rho)	January 2, 1908 – 1911	College of Physicians & Surgeons	St. Louis, Missouri	Consolidated	(Note: Consolidated with Psi Rho chapter.)
Upsilon Pi	January 2, 1908 – 1969	University of Pennsylvania School of Medicine	Philadelphia, Pennsylvania	Inactive	
Pi Delta Phi First	December 31, 1908 – Fall 1911	University of California, Los Angeles	Los Angeles, California	Moved	(Note: Chapter moved from UCLA to UC Berkeley.)
Phi Beta (see Upsilon Iota)	December 31, 1909 – 1916	University of Illinois	Chicago, Illinois	Consolidated	(Note: Phi Beta became the Upsilon Iota chapter.)
Psi Rho Sigma (see Kappa Rho)	December 31, 1909 – 1913	Northwestern University School of Medicine	Chicago, Illinois	Reestablished	(Note: Chapter was re-established as Kappa Rho in 1920.)
Iota Pi (see Delta Phi)	December 31, 1909 – June 1, 1920	University of Southern California School of Medicine	Los Angeles, California	Reestablished	(Note: Chapter closed when the medical school closed. It was revived as Delta Phi in 1928.)
Kappa Delta	December 31, 1910 – 1967	Johns Hopkins University School of Medicine	Baltimore, Maryland	Inactive	(Note: Chapter was instituted on February 26, 1910 and was chartered in December. It absorbed the Mu chapter of the Pi Mu Honor Society with the national merger of the two organizations in 1922.)
Alpha Mu (see Mu)	December 31, 1910 – 1917	Indiana University School of Medicine	Bloomington, Indiana	Consolidated	(Note: Chapter consolidated with Mu chapter when their school reorganized.)
Theta Upsilon	December 31, 1910 – 1971	Temple University School of Medicine	Philadelphia, Pennsylvania	Inactive	
Phi Rho (see Kappa Psi and Kappa Upsilon)	December 31, 1910 –2014	Saint Louis University School of Medicine	Saint Louis, Missouri	Inactive	(Note: Chapter absorbed Kappa Psi chapter in 1911 and Kappa Upsilon chapter in 1962.)
Pi Delta Phi Second	August 1911 – 1967	University of California, Berkeley	Berkeley, California	Inactive	
Theta Eta	October 1913–1977	Medical College of Virginia School of Medicine	Richmond, Virginia	Inactive	(Note: Absorbed the Beta Gamma chapter of Pi Mu Honor Society with the national merger of the two organizations in 1922.)
Sigma Upsilon	December 30, 1911 – 1937	Stanford University School of Medicine	San Francisco, California	Inactive	(Note: Chapter was instituted on October 12, 1911, and was chartered in December.)
Gamma Second	December 30, 1913 –1962	Ohio State University College of Medicine	Columbus, Ohio	Inactive	(Note: Chapter was instituted on November 15, 1913, and was chartered in December.)
Delta Second	December 30, 1913 – 1957	Tufts University School of Medicine	Boston, Massachusetts	Inactive	(Note: Chapter formed from Phi Theta Chi (local), established on October 2, 1902. It became a chapter of Phi Chi on September 24, 1913 and was chartered in December.)
Beta Second	January 1, 1914 – 19xx ?; December 29, 1921 –1931	University of Oregon Medical School	Portland, Oregon	Inactive	
Epsilon Second	December 30, 1914 – 19xx ?; December 29, 1921 – 1942	Wayne State University School of Medicine	Detroit, Michigan	Inactive	(Note: Chapter was instituted on February 8, 1914, and was chartered in December at the Detroit College of Medicine and Surgery, which became Wayne State.)
**Alpha Beta**	December 30, 1914	University of Tennessee Health Science Center	Memphis, Tennessee	Active	(Note: Absorbed the Kappa chapter of Pi Mu Honor Society with the national merger of the two organizations in 1922.) (Note: Chapter was instituted on April 4, 1914 and was chartered in December.)
Lambda Rho	December 30, 1914 – 19xx ?; December 29, 1921 – 1968	University of Arkansas College of Medicine	Little Rock, Arkansas	Inactive	
Kappa Upsilon (see Phi Rho)	December 30, 1914 – 1954	University of Kansas Medical Center	Lawrence, Kansas	Consolidated	(Note: Consolidated with Psi Rho chapter.)
Beta Delta	1915 – 1950	University of Maryland, Baltimore School of Medicine	Baltimore, Maryland	Inactive	(Note: Chapter formed from the merger of Beta, Delta, and Theta of Pi Chi Eastern and Phi Chi and Pi Sigma of Phi Chi Southern.)
**Chi Upsilon**	December 30, 1916	Creighton University School of Medicine	Omaha, Nebraska	Active	
**Upsilon Nu**	December 30, 1916	University of Nebraska Medical School	Omaha, Nebraska	Active	(Note: Chapter was instituted on November 1, 1916, and was chartered in December.)
Upsilon Zeta	January 24, 1918 – 1971	University of Cincinnati College of Medicine	Cincinnati, Ohio	Inactive	
Upsilon Iota (see Phi Beta)	April 18, 1918– 1952	University of Illinois School of Medicine	Chicago, Illinois	Inactive	
Xi Second	December 10, 1919 – 192x ?	Baylor College of Medicine	Dallas, Texas	Reissused, Reestablished	
Kappa Rho (see Psi Rho Sigma)	April 10, 1920 – 1971	Northwestern University Medical School	Chicago, Illinois	Inactive	(Note: Chapter re-established the defunct Psi Rho Sigma chapter.)
Delta Pi	May 14, 1920 – 1945	University of Utah School of Medicine	Salt Lake City, Utah	Inactive	
**Kappa Chi**	May 22, 1920 – 1974; 1981	University of Minnesota Medical School	Minneapolis, Minnesota	Active	
Upsilon Sigma	October 20, 1920 – 1958	Columbia University College of Physicians and Surgeons	New York, New York	Inactive	(Note: Absorbed the Nu chapter of the Pi Mu Honor Society with the national merger of the two organizations in 1922.)
Epsilon Chi	January 22, 1921 – 19xx ?	Marquette University	Milwaukee, Wisconsin	Inactive	
Rho Delta	November 15, 1921 – 1956	Cornell University Medical School	New York, New York	Inactive	
Beta Chi	December 29, 1921 – 1937	University of Colorado School of Medicine	Denver, Colorado	Inactive	(Note: Chapter was instituted on April 8, 1921 and chartered in December.)
Tau Beta	December 29, 1921 – 1974	University of Wisconsin Medical School	Madison, Wisconsin	Inactive	(Note: Chapter was instituted on June 6, 1921, and was chartered in December.)
Xi Third	December 29, 1921– 1971	University of Texas Southwestern Medical School	Dallas, Texas	Inactive	
Sigma Delta	December 29, 1921 – 1942	University of South Dakota School of Medicine	Vermillion, South Dakota	Inactive	(Note: Chapter was instituted on November 9, 1921, and was chartered in December.)
Eta Upsilon	December 29, 1921 – 1935	Harvard Medical School	Boston, Massachusetts	Inactive	(Note: Chapter was instituted on November 17, 1921 and was chartered in December.)
Beta Upsilon	December 29, 1921 – 1958	Boston University School of Medicine	Boston, Massachusetts	Inactive	(Note: This chapter re-established the Beta chapter of Phi Alpha Gamma fraternity which was originally chartered in 1896 but had gone inactive before the merger of the two fraternities.)
Epsilon Delta	February 25, 1922 – 1939	Washington University School of Medicine	St. Louis, Missouri	Inactive	
Beta Mu	May 15, 1922 – 1944	McGill University Faculty of Medicine	Montreal, Canada	Inactive	
Pi Mu	October 14, 1922 – 1972	University of Virginia School of Medicine	Charlottesville, Virginia	Inactive	(Note: Originated as the Alpha chapter of Pi Mu Honor Society in 1892, joining Phi Chi with the national merger of the two organizations in 1922.)
Omicron Kappa	November 25, 1922 – 1960	University of Oklahoma College of Medicine	Oklahoma City, Oklahoma	Inactive	
Gamma Sigma	December 2, 1922 – 1943	Yale School of Medicine	New Haven, Connecticut	Inactive	
Tau Omicron	December 12, 1922 – 1969	University of Toronto Medical School	Toronto, Ontario, Canada	Inactive	
Mu Gamma	December 29, 1923 – 1951	University of Iowa College of Medicine	Iowa City, Iowa	Inactive	
Theta Pi	1926–1976	University of Mississippi School of Medicine	Jackson, Mississippi	Inactive	
**Sigma Kappa** (see Tau)	June 2, 1927	Medical University of South Carolina	Charleston, South Carolina	Active	(Note: This chapter was revived Tau chapter, which had been at the campus before the school's merger as a unit of the University of South Carolina.)
Nu Sigma	1928–2009	Dalhousie University Faculty of Medicine	Halifax, Nova Scotia, Canada	Inactive	
Delta Phi (see Iota Pi)	1929–1970	University of Southern California School of Medicine	Los Angeles, California	Inactive	(Note: Re-established the defunct Iota Pi chapter.)
Theta Beta Pi	1929–1944	Syracuse University College of Medicine	Syracuse, New York	Inactive	
Delta Kappa Upsilon	1929–1940	University of Kansas Medical Center	Kansas City, Kansas	Inactive	
Delta Upsilon	1930–1978	Duke University School of Medicine	Durham, North Carolina	Inactive	
Alpha Phi Sigma	1931–1978	Medical College of Georgia	Augusta, Georgia	Inactive	
Lambda Sigma	1932–1975	Louisiana State University Medical Center	New Orleans, Louisiana	Inactive	
Gamma Chi	1933–1966	West Virginia University School of Medicine	Morgantown, West Virginia	Inactive	
Omega Upsilon Phi	1934–1973	University at Buffalo School of Medicine and Biomedical Sciences	Buffalo, New York	Inactive	(Note: Chapter formed from Alpha of Omega Upsilon Phi fraternity, established in 1894.)
Tau Kappa	1935–1969	Wake Forest School of Medicine	Winston-Salem, North Carolina	Inactive	
Alpha Mu	1938–1960	The State University of New York Health Science Center at Brooklyn	Brooklyn, New York	Inactive	(Note: Chapter was chartered at the Long Island College of Medicine which became The State University of New York Health Science Center in Brooklyn.)
Xi Chi (see Xi Second)	1943–1975	Baylor College of Medicine	Houston, Texas	Inactive	
Phi Alpha	1948–1978	New York Medical College	Valhalla, New York	Inactive	(Note: This was originally the Alpha chapter of Phi Alpha Gamma and was established in 1894.)
Phi Alpha Gamma	1948–1964	Hahnemann Medical College of Philadelphia	Philadelphia, Pennsylvania	Inactive	(Note: This was originally the Gamma chapter of Phi Alpha Gamma fraternity and was established in 1897.)
**Epsilon Kappa**	February 26, 1948	University of Washington School of Medicine	Seattle, Washington	Active	
Epsilon Beta	1952–1967	University of California Medical School	Los Angeles, California	Inactive	
Beta Alpha	1953–1974	University of Miami School of Medicine	Miami, Florida	Inactive	
Mu Sigma	1955–1967	University of Missouri School of Medicine	Columbia, Missouri	Inactive	
Omega	1960–1968	University of Mexico	Mexico City, Mexico	Inactive	
Upsilon Beta Second	1962–1972	University of Puerto Rico School of Medicine	San Juan, Puerto Rico	Inactive	
Phi Sigma Gamma	1963–1967	University of California, Los Angeles School of Medicine	Los Angeles, California	Inactive	
Upsilon Tau	1970–1973	University of Texas Health Science Center at San Antonio	San Antonio, Texas	Inactive	
Upsilon Alpha	1981–1985	University of Arizona College of Medicine	Tucson, Arizona	Inactive	
**Sigma Chi Mu**	October 19, 2001	American University of the Caribbean School of Medicine	St. Maarten, Netherlands Antilles	Active	
Sigma Tau Chi	2002–2010	St. Christopher College of Medicine	Luton, England	Inactive	
**Iota Mu**	2007	St. George's University	Grenada West Indies	Active	
**Mu Alpha**	2011	Medical University of the Americas	Charlestown, Nevis	Active	
**Sigma Omega**	2013	St. Martinus University Faculty of Medicine	Willemstad, Curaçao	Active	
**Mu Delta**	2014	Avalon University School of Medicine	Willemstad, Curaçao	Active	
**Rho Epsilon Omega**	October 22, 2015	Philadelphia College of Osteopathic Medicine, Georgia Campus	Suwanee, Georgia	Active	
**Alpha Tau**	June 18, 2016	Saint James School of Medicine St. Vincent	Arnos Vale, Saint Vincent and the Grenadines	Active	
**Delta Kappa**	June 12, 2018	Saint James School of Medicine Anguilla	Anguilla	Active	
