= Phi Chi =

International medical fraternity

- ΦΧ
- Founded: March 31, 1889; 137 years ago University of Vermont College of Medicine
- Type: Professional
- Affiliation: Independent
- Former affiliation: PFA
- Status: Active
- Emphasis: Medicine
- Scope: International
- Motto: Φθνομεν Χραισμειν; Phthomen Chraismein "First to Serve"
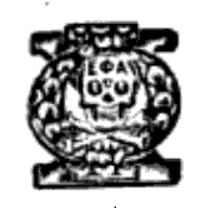
- Member badge
- Colors: Olive green and white
- Symbol: Adult Tiger Beetle (Cicindela patruela), Doodlebug
- Flower: Lily of the valley
- Publication: The Chronicles; formerly The Quarterly
- Chapters: 16
- Headquarters: 2039 Ridgeview Drive; Floyds Knobs, Indiana 47119; United States
- Website: www.phichimed.org

Phi Chi (ΦΧ) is an international co-ed medical fraternity. Phi Chi formed from the 1905 merging of two professional medical fraternities bearing the same name. Phi Chi Society (Phi Chi East) was founded in 1889, at the University of Vermont in Burlington, Vermont. Phi Chi Medical Fraternity (Phi Chi South) was founded in 1894, at the Louisville Medical College in Louisville, Kentucky. Phi Chi has grown to include chapters in five countries. It is a former member of the Professional Fraternity Association.

== History ==
=== Phi Chi Medical Fraternity of the South ===
Alpha (Southern), Louisville, Kentucky, 1895

“October 26, 1894, at four o’clock, p.m., there assembled in the office of Doctor Clinton Kelly” of the faculty of the Louisville Medical College, “A. Harris Kelly, Samuel T. McClung, G. Fowler Border, Joseph N. Powers, George E. Gavin, Charles W. Hibbitt, and Linn L. Kennedy (all of whom became members of Alpha of the Southern Fraternity; now Alpha Alpha) to organize a fraternity.” The first members of the Southern Fraternity consisted of the previously mentioned as well as Carey A. Gray and Walker B. Gossett.

On November 5, 1894, a committee was appointed to draft a constitution and not until November 17, were the first officers elected: Presiding Senior, McClung; Presiding Junior, Gossett; Secretary, Kennedy, and Powers, Treasurer (Judge Advocate and the minor officers had not been provided for). Wedding, Chapman, and Shacklett were elected to membership and included with Gossett and Gray in the charter listing of members. The First Regular Meeting was held on Saturday, December 8, 1894. On December 29, 1894, D.A. Garrison, O. K. Harris, E. Rea Norris, and A.P. Campbell were to complete the charter members.

Beta and Gamma chapters were installed in December 1896. On February 26, 1897, the first Grand Chapter Convention of Southern Phi Chi chapters (Alpha, Beta, Gamma, and Delta) was called; this date later became Founder's Day.

The first volume of The Phi Chi Quarterly, the name of the official fraternal publication, was published on April 1, 1904; its name was changed to The Phi Chi Chronicles in 1989.

=== Phi Chi Medical Fraternity ===
On March 5, 1905, Phi Chi Medical Fraternity (Southern Phi Chi) and Phi Chi Society (Eastern Phi Chi) were joined in Baltimore, Maryland, making Phi Chi the largest medical fraternity in America. Chapter names that conflicted during the joining were resolved by allowing the older chapter to retain its single name and the second chapter to have its name duplicated (Alpha, University of Vermont, 1889; Alpha Alpha, Louisville Medical College, 1894).

On July 1, 1910, the first history of Phi Chi was published. In 1915, the first Phi Chi Directory was published with 37 active chapters (some chapters had been consolidated) and 6,790 initiated members. 1922 saw the merger of Pi Mu Honor Society and Phi Chi, as well as the chartering of the Beta Mu chapter at McGill University, Phi Chi's first Canadian Chapter, on May 15.

In December 1925, the 24th Grand Chapter Convention was held in Montreal, Quebec, Canada. In 1927, the Student Loan Fund was created to provide emergency loans for members in need; it was run by the Phi Chi Welfare Association after its incorporation in 1949.

On February 21, 1948, Phi Alpha Gamma and Phi Chi merged. On February 26, 1960, the fraternity became international with the chartering of the Omega chapter at National Autonomous University of Mexico in Mexico City, Mexico. On May 21, 1962, ΥΒ chapter was chartered at University of Puerto Rico in San Juan, Puerto Rico.

At the XL Grand Chapter Convention in 1973, women medical students were allowed membership. Alpha Alpha and Alpha Beta alumni chapters are chartered in September 1989.

== Symbols ==
Pi Chi's motto is Φθνομεν Χραισμειν (Phthomen Chraismein) or "First to Serve". Its colors are olive green and white. Its symbol is the Adult Tiger Beetle (Cicindela patruela), Doodlebug. Its flower is the Lily of the valley. Its publication is The Chronicle.

== Chapters ==
Phi Chi East was founded in 1889. Phi Chi South was formed in 1894. When the two fraternities combined in 1905, when the name of two chapters conflicted, the chapter with precedence would retain the single letter, and the chapter following shall duplicate its name, such as Alpha (1889), University of Vermont, and Alpha of Louisville (1894), with the latter becoming Alpha Alpha.

== Notable members ==
Name	Original chapter	Notability	Ref.
Irvin Abell	AA 1897	-President American Medical Association 1938 -President American College of Surgeons -President Southeastern Surgical Association -President Kentucky State Medical Association -Named by President Roosevelt as chairman of the national committee to co-operate with the Defense Commission on Public Health in 1940	
Dale Alford	ΛΡ 1939	-86th and 87th US Congress Representative for Arkansas -Keynote speaker for the US as the 51st Inter-Parliamentary Conference in Brasília, Brasil, Appointed by John F. Kennedy	
Edward R. Annis	EX 1938	-117th President American Medical Association 1963 -President World Medical Association 1963 -Director of the Chamber of Commerce of the United States 1969-1975	
David M. Bosworth	A 1921	-Bosworth fracture named in his honor -Awarded membership of Japanese Orthopaedic Association -Only foreign recipient of the Second Order of the Sacred Treasure 1968	
Louis Jermain	EX 1921	-First Dean Marquette University School of Medicine	
Hiram W. Kostmayer	O 1909	-1942-1945 Dean Tulane School of Medicine -Dean, Post-graduate School of Medicine, 1933-37, Tulane	
John McDonald	O 1955	-First Chancellor of the Louisiana State University Medical School, Shreveport, LA -1965-2000 Chancellor of New Orleans Medical Center -Founding member of the American Society for Histocompatibility and Immunogenetics -Founding member of the American Society of Transplant Surgeons -President of the American Society of Transplant Surgeons -2002 55th Recipient of the Roswell Park Medal	
Stuart McGuire	ΘΗ 1891; Beta of Pi Mu Honor Society	-1905-1914 President of the University College of Medicine -1914-1925 President of Medical College of Virginia	
Spurgeon Neel	AB 1942	-Major General US Army -Deputy Surgeon General 1969-1973 -First Commanding General of the U.S. Army Health Services Command	
Kenneth Dew Orr	P 1940	-Major General US Army	
Isidor S. Ravdin	M 1918	-1956 retired as a major general in the Medical Corps, the first person on non-active military service appointed major general	
Donald Tresidder	ΣΥ 1927	-President Stanford University 1943-1948 -Established Stanford Research Institute -Tresidder Peak in Yosemite National Park is named for him	
A. Murat Willis	ΘΗ 1904; Member of Pi Mu Honor Society	-President and founder of Johnston-Willis Hospital, Virginia -President of the Richmond Academy of Medicine	

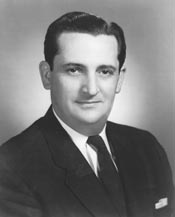
Thomas Alford

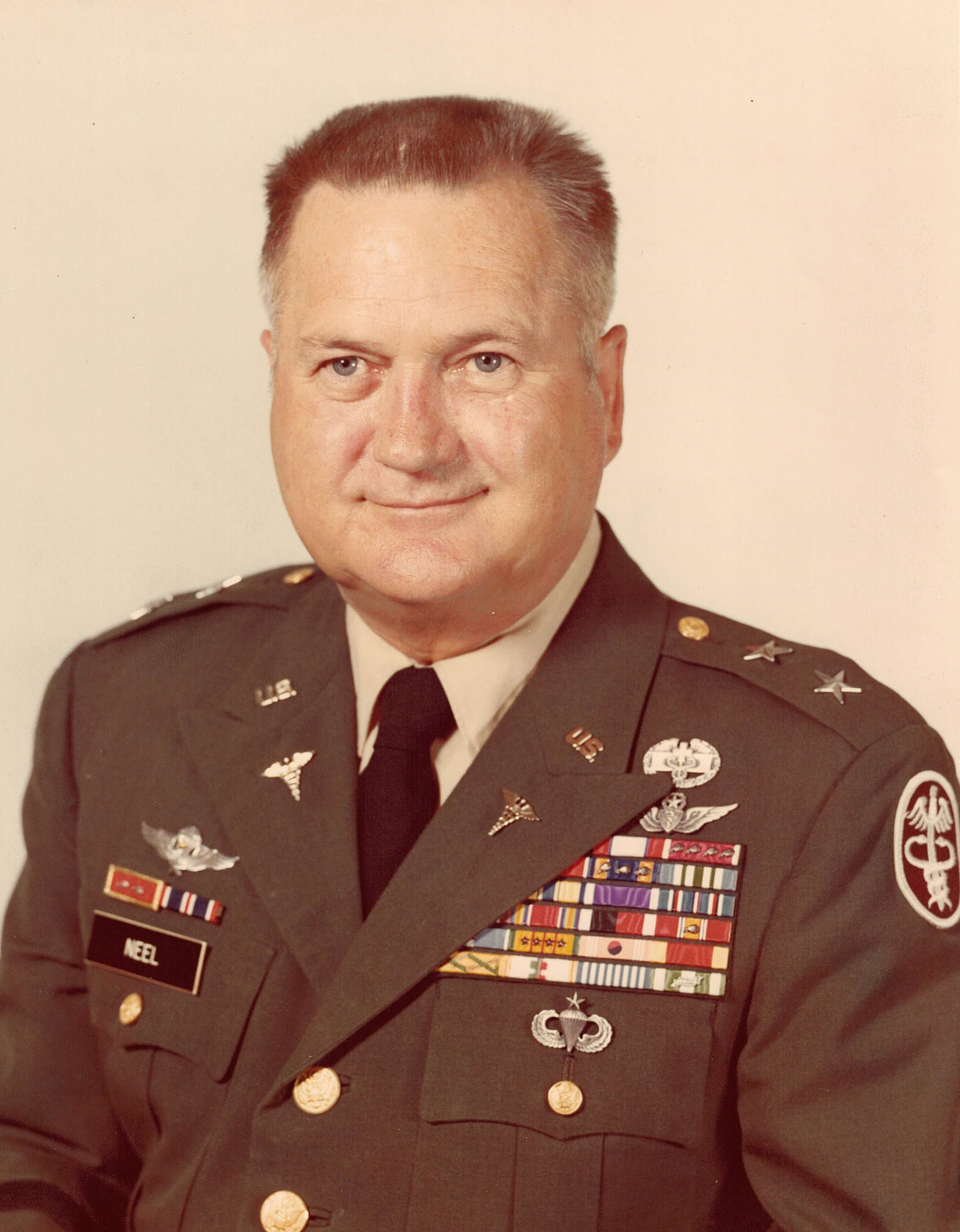
Major General Spurgeon H. Neel Jr.

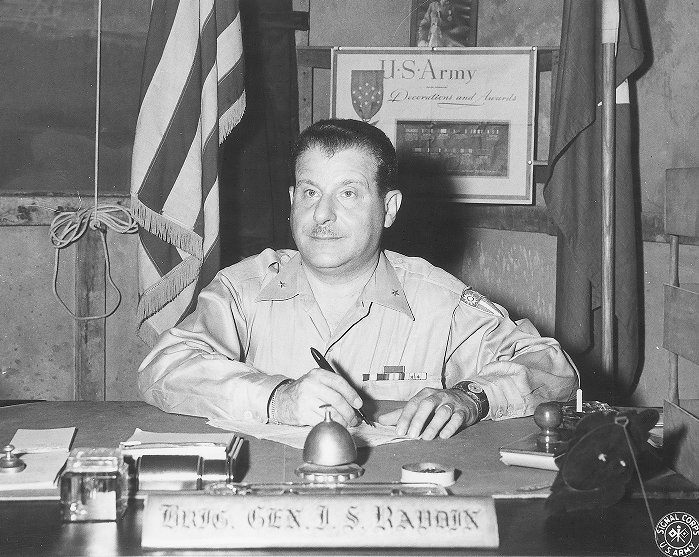
Major General I.S. Ravdin

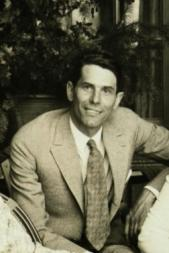
Donald Tresidder

== See also ==
- Professional fraternities and sororities
- List of medical schools in the United States
