= Edward Annis =

Edward Annis may refer to:

- Teddy Hart (Edward Ellsworth Annis, born 1980), Canadian professional wrestler
- Edward R. Annis (1913–2009), Florida surgeon
