= Buckhannon, West Virginia =

City in Upshur County, West Virginia, US

- City
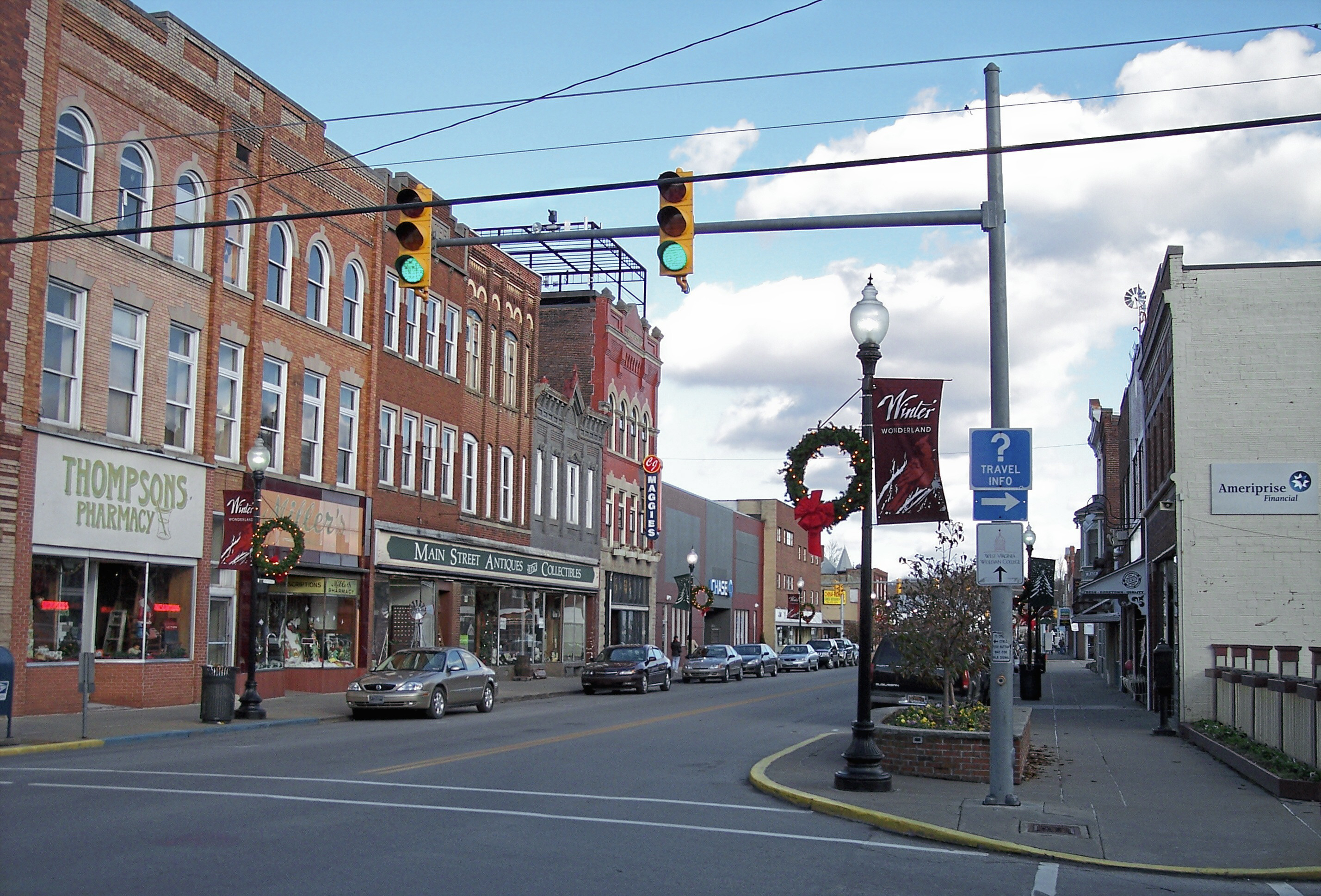
- East Main Street (2006)

- Seal
- Interactive map of Buckhannon, West Virginia
- Location within West Virginia Location within the United States
- Coordinates: 38°59′21″N 80°13′27″W
- Country: United States
- State: West Virginia
- County: Upshur
- Established: 1816
- Chartered: 1852
- Incorporated: March 9, 1933
- Named for: Buckongahelas

Government
  - Mayor: Robbie Skinner

Area
  - Total: 2.85 sq mi (7.38 km^{2})
  - Land: 2.85 sq mi (7.38 km^{2})
  - Water: 0 sq mi (0.00 km^{2})
- Elevation: 1,430 ft (436 m)

Population (2020)
  - Total: 5,186
  - Estimate (2021): 5,265
  - Density: 1,893.4/sq mi (731.03/km^{2})
- Time zone: UTC-5 (Eastern (EST))
  - Summer (DST): UTC-4 (EDT)
- ZIP code: 26201
- Area codes: 304, 681
- FIPS code: 54-11188
- GNIS feature ID: 1536594
- Website: www.buckhannonwv.org

Buckhannon is the only incorporated city in, and the county seat of, Upshur County, West Virginia, United States. Located along the Buckhannon River, the population was 5,299 as of the 2020 census. The city is 46 miles (74 km) southwest of Morgantown, 88 miles (142 km) northeast of the capital city of Charleston, and 100 miles (160 km) south of Pittsburgh, Pennsylvania. It is home to West Virginia Wesleyan College and the West Virginia Strawberry Festival, held annually during the third week of May.

== History ==
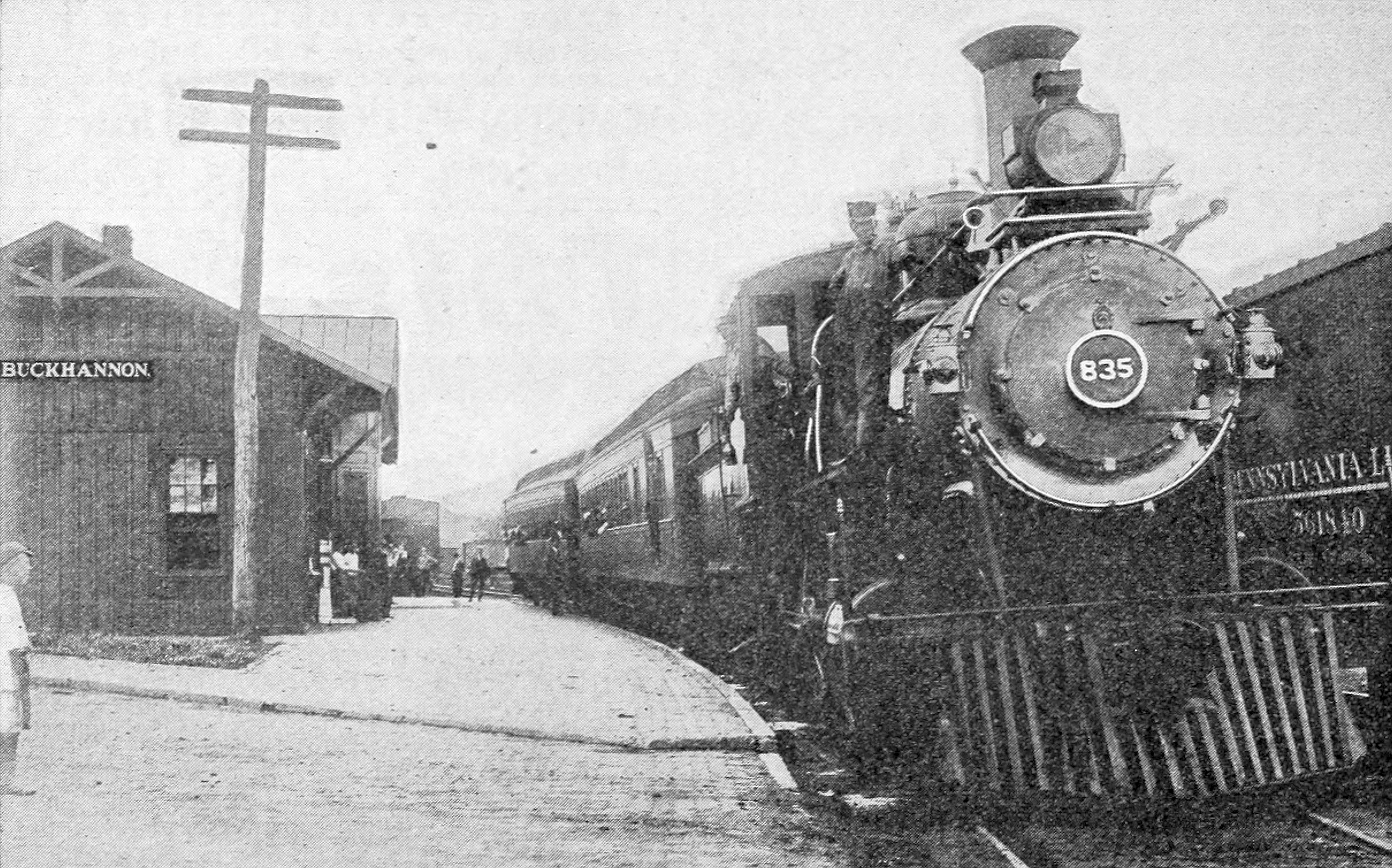
Baltimore and Ohio Railroad "Blue Goose" in Buckhannon, 1914

According to tradition, the first settlers in the Buckhannon River Valley were brothers John and Samuel Pringle. John and Samuel were soldiers serving in the British army during the French and Indian War (Seven Years' War) who, in 1761, deserted their posts at Fort Pitt (present-day Pittsburgh, Pennsylvania). They traveled southward and upstream along the Monongahela and Tygart Valley rivers, continuing up what is now called the Buckhannon River. John and Samuel Pringle are said to have arrived in present-day Upshur County in 1764 and took up residence in the hollow stump of an American sycamore tree later named the Pringle Tree. They lived there for three years, surviving on game and fish. When they ran out of bullets in 1765, John made the journey to settlements along the South Branch Potomac River to purchase more and found out from the locals that the war was over and the brothers were no longer wanted men. After his return, they moved to the South Branch settlements. John later went to Kentucky, but Samuel returned to the river valley in 1769 with his new wife Charity Pringle (née Cutright), her brother John Jr., friends Thomas Hughes, and John and Elizabeth Jackson with their sons George and Edward. (Edward was the grandfather of Thomas "Stonewall" Jackson).

The City of Buckhannon was established on January 15, 1816, possible named for Buckongahelas (1720-1805), the legendary Lenape Chief. A statue of Buckongahelas and his fallen son, crafted by Buckhannon sculptor Ross Straight, was erected in Buckhannon West Virginia’s Jawbone Park in 2000. Most historians think it more likely that the community and river were both named for John Buchannon, a missionary to the area in the 1780s. The city was chartered by the Virginia General Assembly in 1852, and remained part of the Commonwealth of Virginia until the secession of West Virginia on June 20, 1863, during the American Civil War. Because of its near-central geographic location, Buckhannon was long considered a prospective site for the state capital. In 1866, the legislature approved a bill including Buckhannon among the choices for capital, but officials decided the river was not wide enough to accommodate desired commerce and ultimately settled with Charleston as the state capitol.

The first courthouse was built in 1854. It served multiple functions, including as an opera house and town hall. Electricity was installed in 1891 to replace oil lamps, but the building suffered fire damage in the first six months of electrical service, eventually being razed in 1898. In its place, a Classical Revival style courthouse, designed by Charleston architect Harrison Albright, begun construction in 1899 and was completed in 1901. An annex of the same style was added in 1995. In the cornerstone of the main building is a time capsule filled with turn of the 19th century artifacts.

The Sago Mine Disaster, January 2, 2006, killed 12 and left one survivor. Officials said that a lightning strike in the coal caused the explosion. It was the worst mining disaster in the US since a 2001 disaster in Alabama killed 13 people, and the worst disaster in West Virginia since a 1968 incident that killed 78 people. National and international news crews were in the area for upwards of three days to cover rescue and recovery efforts.

The Flood of November 4 1985, Killed 2 in Buckhannon and left thousands of survivors. This was the highest flood recorded in Buckhannon history with the Buckhannon River reaching approximately 30 feet which is 7 feet above flood level. The flooding was due to Hurricane Juan The area was classified as a Major Disaster Area by President Ronald Regan Allowing Federal aid and assistance.

== Geography ==
The city lies in the foothills of the Allegheny Mountains. It is in the Mountain Lakes tourism region.

According to the United States Census Bureau, the city has a total area of 2.83 square miles (7.33 km^{2}), all land.

=== Climate ===
The climate in this area has mild differences between highs and lows, and there is adequate rainfall year-round. According to the Köppen Climate Classification system, Buckhannon has a humid continental climate using the 0 °C (32 °F) isotherm, or a humid subtropical climate using the −3 °C (26.6 °F) isotherm.

Climate data for Buckhannon, West Virginia (1991–2020 normals, extremes 1891–present)
| Month | Jan | Feb | Mar | Apr | May | Jun | Jul | Aug | Sep | Oct | Nov | Dec | Year |
|---|---|---|---|---|---|---|---|---|---|---|---|---|---|
| Record high °F (°C) | 79 (26) | 80 (27) | 86 (30) | 93 (34) | 95 (35) | 96 (36) | 99 (37) | 99 (37) | 100 (38) | 92 (33) | 82 (28) | 79 (26) | 100 (38) |
| Mean maximum °F (°C) | 65.3 (18.5) | 67.4 (19.7) | 75.2 (24.0) | 83.9 (28.8) | 86.8 (30.4) | 89.6 (32.0) | 91.4 (33.0) | 91.0 (32.8) | 89.8 (32.1) | 82.3 (27.9) | 75.2 (24.0) | 66.1 (18.9) | 92.9 (33.8) |
| Mean daily maximum °F (°C) | 40.8 (4.9) | 44.3 (6.8) | 53.2 (11.8) | 65.9 (18.8) | 74.1 (23.4) | 81.0 (27.2) | 84.3 (29.1) | 83.8 (28.8) | 78.6 (25.9) | 66.8 (19.3) | 54.6 (12.6) | 45.0 (7.2) | 64.4 (18.0) |
| Daily mean °F (°C) | 31.0 (−0.6) | 33.5 (0.8) | 41.2 (5.1) | 51.9 (11.1) | 61.4 (16.3) | 69.2 (20.7) | 73.1 (22.8) | 72.0 (22.2) | 65.8 (18.8) | 53.8 (12.1) | 42.9 (6.1) | 35.4 (1.9) | 52.6 (11.4) |
| Mean daily minimum °F (°C) | 21.1 (−6.1) | 22.8 (−5.1) | 29.2 (−1.6) | 37.9 (3.3) | 48.6 (9.2) | 57.4 (14.1) | 62.0 (16.7) | 60.2 (15.7) | 53.0 (11.7) | 40.8 (4.9) | 31.2 (−0.4) | 25.9 (−3.4) | 40.8 (4.9) |
| Mean minimum °F (°C) | −2.3 (−19.1) | 1.3 (−17.1) | 11.7 (−11.3) | 23.6 (−4.7) | 33.2 (0.7) | 43.7 (6.5) | 51.5 (10.8) | 50.0 (10.0) | 39.1 (3.9) | 27.4 (−2.6) | 17.0 (−8.3) | 7.8 (−13.4) | −5.9 (−21.1) |
| Record low °F (°C) | −30 (−34) | −31 (−35) | −13 (−25) | 5 (−15) | 19 (−7) | 29 (−2) | 35 (2) | 34 (1) | 26 (−3) | 11 (−12) | −2 (−19) | −28 (−33) | −31 (−35) |
| Average precipitation inches (mm) | 3.61 (92) | 3.29 (84) | 4.15 (105) | 3.82 (97) | 5.18 (132) | 5.10 (130) | 5.31 (135) | 4.21 (107) | 3.76 (96) | 3.82 (97) | 3.03 (77) | 3.93 (100) | 49.21 (1,250) |
| Average snowfall inches (cm) | 11.9 (30) | 11.3 (29) | 6.7 (17) | 0.7 (1.8) | 0.0 (0.0) | 0.0 (0.0) | 0.0 (0.0) | 0.0 (0.0) | 0.0 (0.0) | 0.1 (0.25) | 1.8 (4.6) | 6.9 (18) | 39.4 (100) |
| Average precipitation days (≥ 0.01 in) | 17.3 | 14.5 | 14.4 | 14.1 | 15.6 | 14.4 | 13.6 | 12.2 | 11.0 | 11.7 | 11.9 | 15.9 | 166.6 |
| Average snowy days (≥ 0.1 in) | 8.4 | 6.2 | 3.6 | 0.6 | 0.0 | 0.0 | 0.0 | 0.0 | 0.0 | 0.1 | 1.5 | 4.9 | 25.3 |
Source: NOAA

== Demographics ==
Historical population
| Census | Pop. | Note | %± |
|---|---|---|---|
| 1860 | 427 | | — |
| 1870 | 475 | | 11.2% |
| 1880 | 761 | | 60.2% |
| 1890 | 1,403 | | 84.4% |
| 1900 | 1,589 | | 13.3% |
| 1910 | 2,225 | | 40.0% |
| 1920 | 3,785 | | 70.1% |
| 1930 | 4,374 | | 15.6% |
| 1940 | 4,450 | | 1.7% |
| 1950 | 6,016 | | 35.2% |
| 1960 | 6,386 | | 6.2% |
| 1970 | 7,261 | | 13.7% |
| 1980 | 6,820 | | −6.1% |
| 1990 | 5,909 | | −13.4% |
| 2000 | 5,725 | | −3.1% |
| 2010 | 5,639 | | −1.5% |
| 2020 | 5,186 | | −8.0% |
| 2021 (est.) | 5,265 | | 1.5% |
U.S. Decennial Census

=== 2020 census ===
As of the 2020 census, Buckhannon had a population of 5,186. The median age was 34.8 years. 17.0% of residents were under the age of 18 and 20.1% of residents were 65 years of age or older. For every 100 females there were 88.2 males, and for every 100 females age 18 and over there were 85.0 males age 18 and over.

99.6% of residents lived in urban areas, while 0.4% lived in rural areas.

There were 2,040 households in Buckhannon, of which 23.1% had children under the age of 18 living in them. Of all households, 33.6% were married-couple households, 21.7% were households with a male householder and no spouse or partner present, and 37.0% were households with a female householder and no spouse or partner present. About 41.2% of all households were made up of individuals and 19.3% had someone living alone who was 65 years of age or older.

There were 2,431 housing units, of which 16.1% were vacant. The homeowner vacancy rate was 4.2% and the rental vacancy rate was 16.1%.

The median income for a household in the city was $46,602 and the poverty rate was 19.5%.

Racial composition as of the 2020 census
| Race | Number | Percent |
|---|---|---|
| White | 4,670 | 90.1% |
| Black or African American | 166 | 3.2% |
| American Indian and Alaska Native | 20 | 0.4% |
| Asian | 51 | 1.0% |
| Native Hawaiian and Other Pacific Islander | 4 | 0.1% |
| Some other race | 44 | 0.8% |
| Two or more races | 231 | 4.5% |
| Hispanic or Latino (of any race) | 136 | 2.6% |

=== 2010 census ===
As of the census of 2010, there were 5,639 people, 2,148 households, and 1,149 families living in the city. The population density was 1,992.6 inhabitants per square mile (769.3/km^{2}). There were 2,398 housing units at an average density of 847.3 per square mile (327.1/km^{2}). The racial makeup of the city was 94.5% White, 2.1% African American, 0.2% Native American, 0.9% Asian, 0.4% from other races, and 1.9% from two or more races. Hispanic or Latino of any race were 2.5% of the population.

There were 2,148 households, of which 22.6% had children under the age of 18 living with them, 38.5% were married couples living together, 11.6% had a female householder with no husband present, 3.4% had a male householder with no wife present, and 46.5% were non-families. 39.9% of all households were made up of individuals, and 18.2% had someone living alone who was 65 years of age or older. The average household size was 2.13 and the average family size was 2.84.

The median age in the city was 33.1 years. 16.1% of residents were under the age of 18; 25.5% were between the ages of 18 and 24; 18.9% were from 25 to 44; 22.5% were from 45 to 64; and 17.1% were 65 years of age or older. The gender makeup of the city was 47.5% male and 52.5% female.

=== 2000 census ===
As of the census of 2000, there were 5,725 people, 2,159 households, and 1,180 families living in the city. The population density was 2,314.2 people per square mile (894.9/km^{2}). There were 2,424 housing units at an average density of 979.8 per square mile (378.9/km^{2}). The racial makeup of the city was 96.16% White, 2.01% African American, 0.10% Native American, 0.84% Asian, 0.02% Pacific Islander, 0.28% from other races, and 0.59% from two or more races. Hispanic or Latino of any race were 0.96% of the population.

There were 2,159 households, out of which 22.6% had children under the age of 18 living with them, 41.1% were married couples living together, 10.9% had a female householder with no husband present, and 45.3% were non-families. 40.0% of all households were made up of individuals, and 19.1% had someone living alone who was 65 years of age or older. The average household size was 2.08 and the average family size was 2.78.

In the city, the population was spread out, with 15.5% under the age of 18, 28.1% from 18 to 24, 19.2% from 25 to 44, 19.8% from 45 to 64, and 17.4% who were 65 years of age or older. The median age was 31 years. For every 100 females, there were 81.3 males. For every 100 females age 18 and over, there were 78.4 males.

The median income for a household in the city was $23,421, and the median income for a family was $36,975. Males had a median income of $30,691 versus $18,041 for females. The per capita income for the city was $12,959. About 15.8% of families and 24.8% of the population were below the poverty line, including 32.7% of those under age 18 and 11.2% of those age 65 or over.

== Government ==
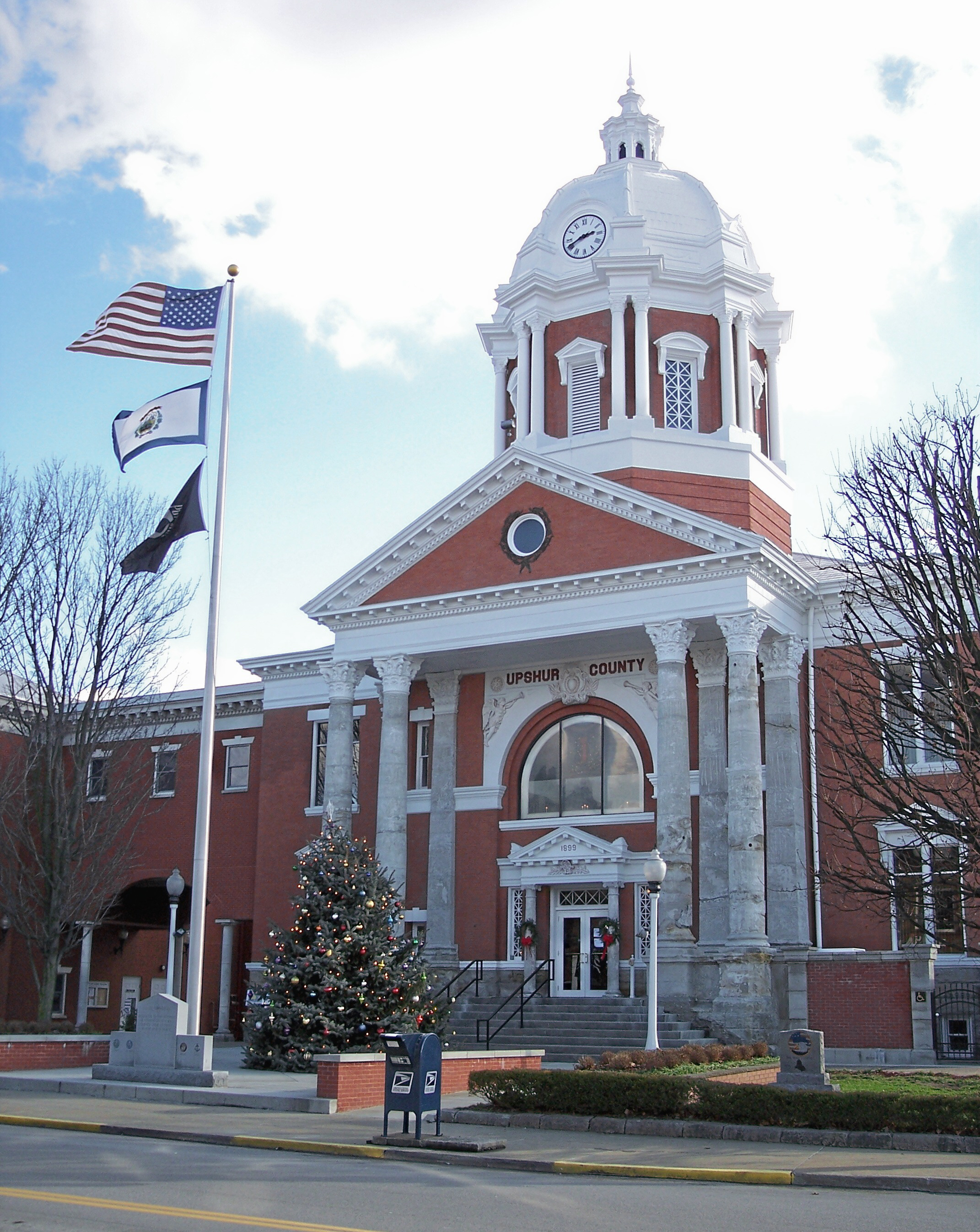
The Upshur County Courthouse in Buckhannon, 2006

Upshur County and Buckhannon have maintained a Republican majority since the days of the American Civil War. On May 23, 1861, the voters of Upshur County voted 7 to 3 against secession from the United States. The majority of soldiers from Upshur served in the Union Army, while over 180 soldiers enlisted in the Confederate Army. In the 1864 presidential election, incumbent President Lincoln won the county handily against General McClellan.

The City of Buckhannon is under a Mayor-council government system. The Mayor of the City of Buckhannon serves as a Strong Mayor. He has a seat on the City Council, which includes five additional elected council members. The City Recorder is also an official. The election of the Mayor occurs every four years in the same year as the presidential elections. By law, the City Recorder succeeds to the Office of Mayor acting as the Chief Executive in the event of the sitting Mayor's death or vacancy. The City Recorder also administers the Mayoral Oath of Office.

The City Council for the City of Buckhannon:

- Robbie Skinner - Mayor (2020–2024)
- Randy Sanders - City Recorder (2019-2022)
- David W. McCauley - Council Member - (2022–2026)
- Pamela M. Cuppari Bucklew - Council Member - (2016–2024)
- Jack Reger - Council Member - (2020–2024)
- CJ Rylands - Council Member - (2020–2024)
- David Thomas - Council Member - (2016–2022)

== Education ==
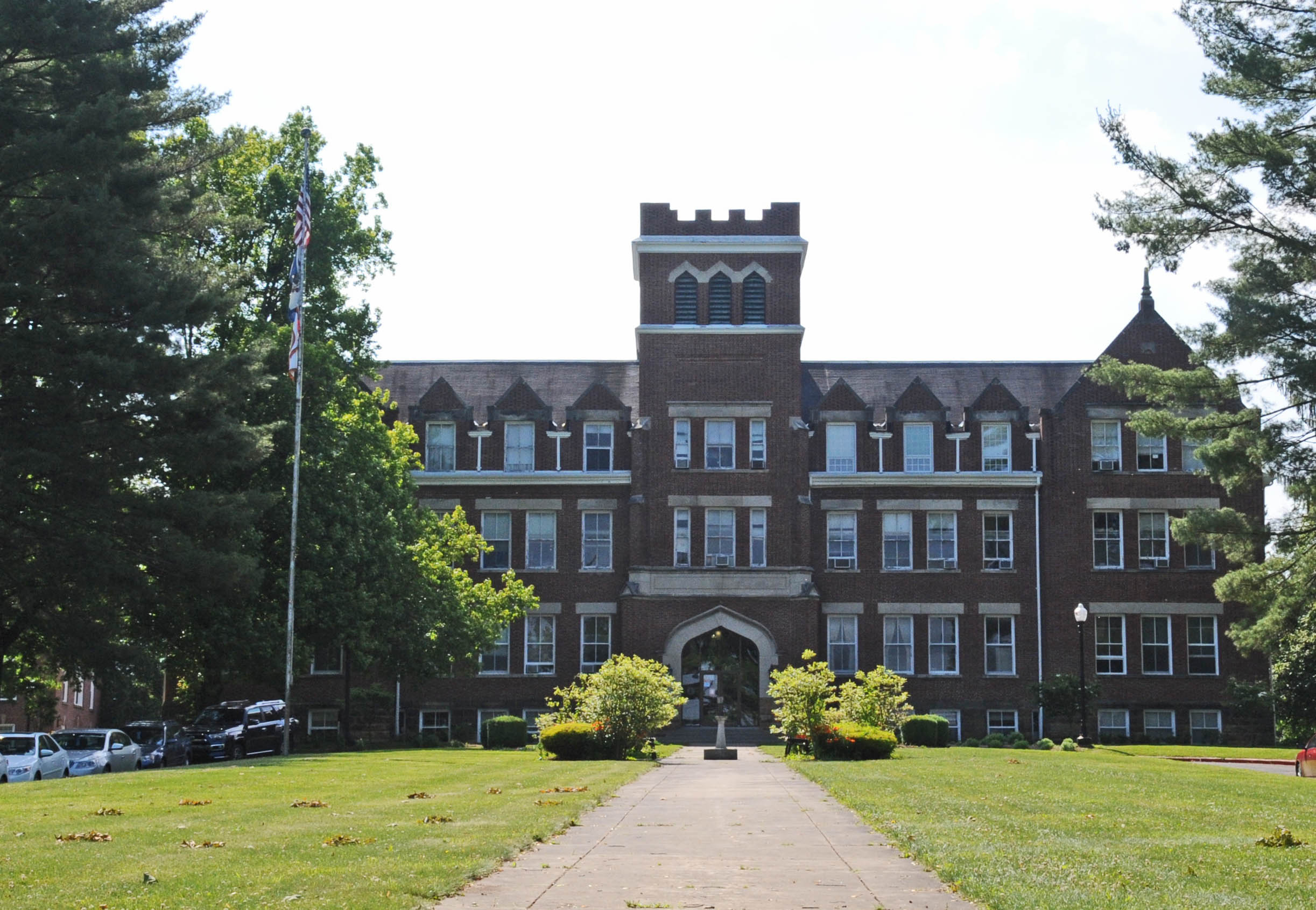
West Virginia Wesleyan College

The institutions of public primary and secondary learning serving the community of Buckhannon are operated by Upshur County Schools. West Virginia Wesleyan College is a private liberal arts college located in Buckhannon.

=== High schools ===
- Buckhannon-Upshur High School
- Fred W. Eberle Technical Center

=== Middle schools ===
- Buckhannon-Upshur Middle School

=== Elementary schools ===
- Buckhannon Academy Elementary School
- French Creek Elementary School
- Hodgesville Elementary School
- Rock Cave Elementary School
- Tennerton Elementary School
- Union Elementary School
- Washington District Elementary School

== Media ==
There are a few radio stations and television stations located in Buckhannon. Some transmitters reach to Weston, WV, Elkins, WV, Parkersburg, WV, Morgantown, WV, Martinsburg, WV and Clay, WV.

- WBRB 101.3 FM
- WFBY 93.5 FM
- WBUC 1460 AM
- WVPW 88.9 FM
- WVWC 92.1 FM

Buckhannon is also home to a local Leased access Cable television station, Channel 3, which is available to Optimum cable subscribers. The station features a community bulletin board with local television advertising and events, as well as religious broadcasting and family television programming.

Buckhannon's main newspaper is the Record Delta.

== Notable people ==
- Kyle Andrews, jazz drummer
- Stephen Coonts, American thriller and suspense novelist
- Scott Munson Cutlip, pioneer in public relations education
- Alston G. Dayton, U.S. Representative, West Virginia 2nd District
- Floyd Farnsworth (1869–1946), politician
- Charley Harper, American Modernist artist
- Olive Ireland Hodges, American missionary teacher in Japan
- Weijia Jiang, White House correspondent and morning anchor for CBS News
- Jean Lee Latham, American writer
- Pare Lorentz, pioneering documentary filmmaker, with film added to the National Film Registry
- Irene McKinney, Poet Laureate of West Virginia, appointed 1994 until her death in February 2012
- Ace Mumford, college football head football coach
- Jayne Anne Phillips, Pulitzer-Prize winning novelist and short story writer
- Kimberly A. Reed, former Chairman and President of the Export–Import Bank of the United States
- Edward Gay Rohrbough, Republican United States Representative
- Cebe Ross, former West Virginia Wesleyan coach
- Chris Wallace, general manager of the Memphis Grizzlies

== In other media ==
- "Ballet for a Girl in Buchannon" (song cycle by Chicago from their 1970 album Chicago II; writer James Pankow misspelled the town name)
- The town was featured in the 2017 German television documentary "Auslandsjournal", as an example of the growing problem of illegal drug use in the US.

== See also ==
- Buckhannon-Upshur High School
- Coal Mining
- WFBY
