= Phi Chi Society =

American medical fraternity

- ΦΧ
- Founded: March 31, 1889; 137 years ago University of Vermont College of Medicine
- Type: Professional
- Affiliation: Independent
- Status: Merged
- Merge date: 1905
- Successor: Phi Chi Medical Fraternity, Inc.
- Emphasis: Medicine
- Scope: National
- Chapters: 5
- Headquarters: 2039 Ridgeview Drive; Floyds Knobs, Indiana 47119; United States

Phi Chi Society (ΦΧ) was an American medical fraternity that was established in 1889 at the University of Vermont. In 1905, it merged with another organization with the same Greek letter name and purpose, forming Phi Chi Medical Fraternity, Inc.

== History ==
Phi Chi Society or what would become known as the Eastern Fraternity of Phi Chi, was founded by Caleb Wakefield Clark with the support of Frederick Luther Osgood, Isaac Newton Fox and Alfred Judson Young, all of the class of 1889 at the University of Vermont. In March 1889, Clark decided that the local fraternity, Delta Mu, needed organized opposition and formulated the plans that resulted in the organization of a quiz class. Just before his death on June 13, 1914, Doctor Clark; in a letter to T. Elmer Grubbs, senior associate editor of the Phi Chi Quarterly, wrote:

"Phi Chi was not formed for purely social reasons and indeed, my aim and desire to bring about such an organization was primarily to get together and discuss things medical and thus get more out of our college course. The new fraternity was to be established to give all possible aid in the dissemination of knowledge and information along medical lines and to broaden and uplift the minds of all, as I keenly felt the need of a Society through which we could work and cooperate.”

Contrary to his expectations however, the society remained a local quiz class until 1896 when a number of members from the University of Vermont met in Baltimore. These agreed to organize a chapter along the lines of the Mother Chapter, asked, and received permission to organize. Thus, Beta was chartered in the Baltimore Medical College. In 1900 Gamma was chartered in the Maine Medical College under similar circumstances. In 1902 and 1903, Beta organized Delta and Theta in Baltimore. These chapters did not have a Grand Chapter, unless the permission of Alpha would constitute Supreme Authority, until 1904 and then only until self-preservation compelled them to. On February 26, 1904, Alpha called a convention of Phi Chi Society chapters to meet in Burlington, Vermont on June 5, 1904, as the first convention of the Grand Chapter.

In 1904, with the chapter of Phi Chi Medical Fraternity Kappa and Phi in Washington and Chi in Philadelphia, Dalferes P. Curry Jr. attempted to gain an entrance into Baltimore for Phi Chi Medical Fraternity. He found there a fraternity called Phi Chi Society but without a Grand Chapter and not very closely united. In his peculiar way, he began operations to enter Baltimore. He knew it was not expedient to attempt to establish another fraternity of the same name in any of the schools where the Eastern Phi Chi already had chapters, so he began to deal directly with its members.

During that year Phi Chi East, called a conference of its chapters and organized a Grand Chapter, retaining the name. Curry pointed out to them that the Southern fraternity, Phi Chi Medical Fraternity was incorporated; the use of the name and seal therefore restricted and they would have to take a new name. The Eastern boys were as shrewd as Curry and offered to confer on the subject of consolidation with the result that the Eastern organization was absorbed in toto, leaving the matter of badge to be settled by a joint committee.

Alpha, of course, being the oldest chapter remained Alpha but all the other chapters changed their names as per agreement. The Southern branch retained the executive power. On March 5, 1905, Phi Chi Medical Fraternity (Southern Phi Chi) and Phi Chi Society (Eastern Phi Chi) are joined in Baltimore, Maryland, making Phi Chi the largest medical fraternity in the United States. Chapter names which conflicted during the joining were resolved by allowing the older chapter to retain its single name and the second chapter to have its name duplicated (Alpha, University of Vermont, 1889; Alpha Alpha, Louisville Medical College, 1894).

== Chapters ==
Following is a list of Phi Chi Society chapters. Inactive chapters and institutions are in italics.

Chapter	Charter date and range	Institution	Location	Status	Ref.
Alpha	1889–1967	University of Vermont College of Medicine	Burlington, Vermont	Merged	(Note: Became the Alpha chapter of Phi Chi of Phi Chi Medical Fraternity after the merger.)
Beta	1895–1913	Baltimore Medical College	Baltimore, Maryland	Merged	(Note: Became Beta Beta chapter of Phi Chi Medical Fraternity after the merger.)
Gamma	1900–1921	Maine Medical College	Brunswick, Maine	Merged	(Note: Became Gamma Gamma chapter of Phi Chi Medical Fraternity after the merger.)
Delta	1902–1915	College of Physicians and Surgeons	Baltimore, Maryland	Merged	(Note: Became Delta Delta chapter of Phi Chi Medical Fraternity after the merger.)
Theta	1903–1907	Maryland Medical College	Baltimore, Maryland	Merged	(Note: Became Theta Theta chapter of Phi Chi Medical Fraternity after the merger.)

== See also ==
- List of Phi Chi chapters
