= Bosworth fracture =

- Specialty: Orthopedic

The Bosworth fracture is a rare fracture of the distal fibula with an associated fixed posterior dislocation of the proximal fibular fragment which becomes trapped behind the posterior tibial tubercle. The injury is caused by severe external rotation of the ankle. The ankle remains externally rotated after the injury, making interpretation of X-rays difficult which can lead to misdiagnosis and incorrect treatment. The injury is most commonly treated by open reduction internal fixation as closed reduction is made difficult by the entrapment of the fibula behind the tibia.

The entrapment of an intact fibula behind the tibia was described by Ashhurst and Bromer in 1922, who attributed the description of the mechanism of injury to Huguier's 1848 publication. The injury involving fibular fracture with posterior dislocation was described by David M. Bosworth in 1947.

== Treatment ==
Because of a fixed dislocation within the proximal fibular fragment posterior of the lateral ridge of the tibia, Bosworth fracture is typically irreducible using closed techniques. As a result, an early open reduction is required to avoid further complications.

== Outlook ==
Complications such as cutaneous necrosis, superficial infection, compartmental syndrome, astragalus avascular necrosis, joint stiffness, superficial fibular nerve lesion, and secondary arthrosis are more common in the Bosworth injury compared to any other type of ankle fracture-dislocation. Delays in surgical reduction or repeated close reduction efforts are risk factors for poor results and an increased risk of complications.
