= Amanda Taylor Norris =

American physician (1849–1944)

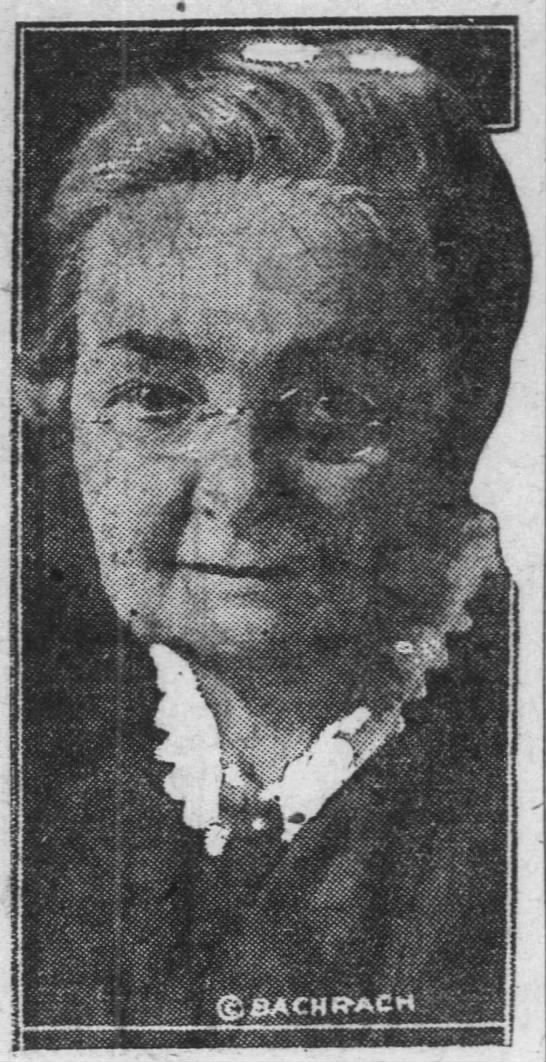
- Born: February 6, 1849; Harford County, Maryland, U.S.
- Died: April 27, 1944 (aged 95); Pikesville, Maryland
- Education: Woman's Medical College of Pennsylvania
- Occupation: Physician
- Known for: First woman physician in Maryland

Amanda E. Taylor Norris (February 6, 1849 – April 27, 1944) was an American physician, the first woman physician in the state of Maryland. After graduating from the Woman's Medical College of Pennsylvania in 1880, she worked in private practice in the Baltimore area, spending nearly two decades teaching at coeducational and women's medical schools there.

== Early life ==
Amanda Taylor Norris was born in 1849 in Harford County, Maryland. Her family was well-off, and she was largely educated at home by a private tutor. A plan for her to stay with relatives and study at a nearby school was abandoned when she became homesick. When she was seventeen, she spent a year studying at a girls' seminary in Carroll County, Maryland.

As a young woman, she married one of her cousins, with whom she had one child.

== Medical career ==
Norris' brother attended medical school in Baltimore, and after attending his graduation in 1875, she read an article about Woman's Medical College of Pennsylvania in Philadelphia and became interested in attending. Her father agreed to support her in attending the college. He assumed she would drop out before completing the program, but she graduated in 1880 and moved back to Maryland, establishing a private practice in Baltimore. With this, she became the first woman physician in Maryland.

While working in private practice as a general practitioner, Norris worked as a professor for 18 years. She was hired to teach anatomy at Maryland Medical College, a coeducational school that operated briefly until the opening of Johns Hopkins Medical School. She then taught at the newly founded Women's Medical College of Baltimore, which opened in 1882. After two years in the school's Throat and Chest Clinic, she became a lecturer and then a professor of pharmaceutical science. After five years in that department, she transitioned to teaching obstetrics in 1891.

In 1894, after nearly two decades of simultaneously teaching and practicing medicine, Norris left her position at the medical college and focused solely on her practice, which she moved from Baltimore to Baltimore County. Having joined the Medical Chirurgical Faculty of Maryland, now the Maryland State Medical Society, in 1886, she was also a member of the Women's Medical Society from 1914 onward.

== Death and legacy ==
Norris became partially paralyzed after a stroke in 1939. A lifelong resident of Maryland, she died in 1944, at age 95.

The Women's Medical Society had honored her for her work over nearly half a century in 1929, emphasizing her accomplishments as unrelated to her gender. In 1995, she was posthumously added to the Maryland Women's Hall of Fame.
