= David M. Bosworth =

American orthopedic surgeon and medical educator (1897–1979)

- Born: 23 January 1897; Harlem, New York
- Died: 11 July 1979 (aged 82); Bennington, Vermont
- Occupations: orthopedic surgeon and medical educator.

David Marsh Bosworth (23 January 1897, in New York City – 11 July 1979, in Vermont) was an American orthopedic surgeon and medical educator. He is remembered for describing the Bosworth fracture.

== Biography ==
David Bosworth was born in New York City in 1897, the son of a minister. He attended the City College of New York and the University of Vermont, graduating B.A. cum laude in 1918. He studied medicine at the University of Vermont College of Medicine, member of Phi Chi medical fraternity, graduating cum laude in 1921, and was elected to Phi Beta Kappa society.

He carried out his internship at the Mary Fletcher Hospital in Burlington, Vermont, and his residency at the Woman's Hospital in New York. He then worked as Instructor of Anatomy at the University of Vermont College of Medicine for three years before becoming Lecturer in Anatomy at Columbia University College of Physicians and Surgeons in 1925 and then orthopedic resident at the New York Orthopaedic Hospital in 1926.

After completing his residency in 1928 he worked in New York, holding staff appointments at St. Luke's Hospital, New York Polyclinic Hospital, St. Vincent's Hospital, Seaview Hospital, the House of St. Giles the Cripple and Richmond Borough Hospital, in addition to being consultant to 22 hospitals. He became Visiting Professor at the University of Vermont in 1942, and was Professor at the New York Polyclinic Medical School and at Flower-Fifth Avenue Medical School. He was also Consultant Surgeon of the New York City Police Department from 1945, Impartial Specialist to the New York Supreme Court and the United States Department of Labor, and examiner for the American Board of Orthopaedic Surgery from 1940 to 1966.

Between 1930 and 1967 he published 94 papers, including work on bone and joint tuberculosis, including the introduction of streptomycin for its treatment. He also published papers on surgery of the hip, spine and shoulder. He described the rare fibular fracture that bears his name in a 1947 series of 5 patients, still the largest series of this ankle injury. He was appointed to the Editorial Board and the Board of Trustees of the Journal of Bone and Joint Surgery, serving as Treasurer.

He was President of the American Orthopaedic Association in 1957, was elected to Alpha Omega Alpha, and was awarded an honorary D.Sc. by the University of Vermont in 1963. He was awarded membership of the Japanese Orthopaedic Association, and became the only foreign recipient of the Second Order of the Sacred Treasure in April 1968.
