= Irvin Abell =

American surgeon (1876–1949)

- Born: September 13, 1876; Lebanon, Kentucky, U.S.
- Died: August 28, 1949 (aged 72); Ontario, Canada
- Resting place: Calvary Cemetery; Louisville, Kentucky, U.S.
- Education: University of Marburg; University of Berlin; Louisville Medical College
- Occupations: Surgeon; professor
- Employer: University of Louisville
- Spouse: Carrie Harting (m. 1907)
- Children: 4
- Military career
- Allegiance: United States
- Branch: U.S. Army Medical Corps
- Rank: Colonel
- Conflicts: World War I

Irvin Abell (September 13, 1876 – August 28, 1949) was a surgeon from Louisville, Kentucky.

== Early life ==
Irvin Abell was born on September 13, 1876, in Lebanon, Kentucky to Sarah Silesia (née Rogers) and William Irvin Abell. The Abell family had lived in Kentucky since 1788. He attended St Augustine's Catholic School in Lebanon. He graduated from St. Mary's College in 1894 with a Master of Arts. Abell graduated from Louisville Medical College in 1897 and then studied in Germany at the University of Marburg and the University of Berlin.

== Career ==
In 1897, Abell interned at Louisville City Hospital. Abell joined the faculty at Louisville Medical College faculty in 1900 and became professor of surgery when the school merged with the University of Louisville in 1908. He remained in the role of professor until he retired in June 1947. He was named to the school's board of trustees in 1935.

During World War I, Abell served in the U.S. Army Medical Corps. He was commanding officer of a base hospital in France, and served as a colonel.

Abell was the first Grand Presiding Senior (president) of Phi Chi medical fraternity (Southern) in 1897.

Abell was president of the American Medical Association from 1938 to 1939, and also served as president of the American College of Surgeons, Southeastern Surgical Association, and the Kentucky State Medical Association. During World War II he chaired the national committee that consulted with the Department of Defense on matters of public health.

Abell wrote the book Retrospect of Surgery In Kentucky.

== Personal life ==
Abell married Carrie Harting of Lexington, Kentucky on October 19, 1907. Together, they had four sons: Irvin Abell Jr., Spalding, William and Jonathan.

Abell died on August 28, 1949, while vacationing at Kamp Kaintuck on Pickerel River in Ontario. He was buried in Calvary Cemetery in Louisville.

== Awards ==
In 1938, Abell received the Laetare Medal, an award given by the University of Notre Dame annually to an "outstanding Catholic layman". Abell received honorary doctor of science degrees from Georgetown University, Manhattan College, Columbia University and University of Louisville. He also received honorary doctor of law degrees from Marquette University and the University of Cincinnati.
