= Maryland Medical College =

Private college in Baltimore, Maryland (1898–1913)

- Type: Private
- Active: 1898–1913
- Location: Baltimore, Maryland, United States
- Colors: Red and green
- Mascot: Medicos

Maryland Medical College was an American medical school that was located in Baltimore, Maryland. Its operated from 1898 to 1913.

== History ==
The Maryland Medical College and the related National Temperance Hospital were established in Baltimore, Maryland in 1898. The project was financed through the sale of $5,000 in capital stock. Its founders included recently resigned faculty members of the Baltimore University School of Medicine and two professional medical doctors: Haughton Baxley, Henry M. Baxley, Joseph H. Branham, Frederick Caruthers, W. Wayland Frames, J. William Funck, G. Milton Linthicum, Edward A. Munoz, B. P. Muse, and John B. Schwwatka. The founders served as the faculty and directors of the college. Branham was its president.

Maryland Medical College opened in September 1898 with seventy students and fourteen professors. Its first commencement was in May 1899 for seventeen graduates. In May 1900, it had 44 graduates from seventeen states and four countries. The college had 150 students by 1904.

However, the Maryland Medical College reportedly acquired many of its students by recruiting those who were failing at other medical schools. As a result, 104 of the 150 students in 1904 were graduating seniors, despite the college's three-year program. In 1912, it had 183 students. The college received a C rating from the American Medical Association, given to "colleges requiring a complete reorganization to make them acceptable". In the spring of 1913, the State Medical Board refused to let the 31 graduates of the college take the examination to practice medicine.

Although there were attempts to merge Maryland Medical College into the University of Maryland, those efforts were unsuccessful. On September 8, 1913, the board of trustees voted to close the Maryland Medical College.

== Campus ==
Maryland Medical College was originally located in the former Newton Academy building at 1114 to 1120 West Baltimore Street in Baltimore, Maryland. The National Temperance Hospital was located on the fourth floor of the college's building. In 1901, the college acquired two buildings at the corner of Calhoun and Fayette, which were converted into the renamed Franklin Square Hospital. In 1905, those buildings were razed for a new hospital facility. Later, the college added a 100-seat lecture hall and a 200-seat amphitheater.

The Flexner Report, published in 1910, noted that the medical school's building was "wretchedly dirty" with "so-called" labs and a "foul" dissecting room. In addition, Maryland Medical College did not have a library, teaching accessories, or a museum.

Maryland Medical School moved to Franklin Square, near the hospital, in 1912. The new fireproof building cost $35,000 and was connected to the hospital. It was 43 feet by 75 feet and was decorated with brick, granite, white marble, and terracotta trimmings.

== Student life ==
Students published a yearbook called The Collegian. Its colors were possibly red and green. The college had chapters of Kappa Psi fraternity, Theta Kappa Psi professional medical fraternity, and the Phi Chi Society medical fraternity.

== Athletics ==
Maryland Medical School participated in collegiate athletics as the Medicos. The school had baseball, basketball, and football teams. Its football team played against the 1899 Virginia Orange and Blue football team, the 1904 George Washington Hatchetites football team, and the 1905 Lehigh Brown and White football team.

== Notable people ==
=== Alumni ===
- Floyd Farnsworth (1904), West Virginia House of Delegates, physician, and author

=== Faculty ===
- Amanda Taylor Norris, demonstrator of anatomy and first woman physician in Maryland

== See also ==
- List of defunct medical schools in the United States
