= Phi Alpha Gamma =

American professional fraternity

- ΦΑΓ
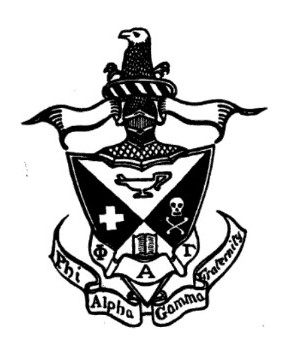
- Founded: March 25, 1894; 131 years ago New York Homeopathic Medical College
- Type: Professional
- Affiliation: Independent
- Status: Merged
- Merge date: February 21, 1948
- Successor: Phi Chi
- Emphasis: Homeopathic Medicine
- Scope: National (United States)
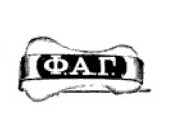
- Member badge
- Colors: Violet
- Flower: Violet
- Publication: The Phi Alpha Gamma Quarterly
- Chapters: 13 (inactive)
- Headquarters: United States

Phi Alpha Gamma (ΦΑΓ) was a professional fraternity for homeopathic medicine founded at the New York Homeopathic Medical College in 1894. Once the largest medical fraternity in the United States, It merged with Phi Chi in 1948.

== History ==
Phi Alpha Gamma was established by seven students at the New York Homeopathic Medical College on March 25, 1894. Its founders were:

- Thomas Drysdale Buchanan
- Thomas Franklin Davies
- Edmund M. De Vol
- Robert Mortimer Jones
- Brooks De Forest Norwood
- Arthur Barr Smith
- Harry Sterns Willard

The fraternity held its first annual convention at Boston University on November 26, 1896. During the convention, it became a national fraternity by chartering Beta chapter at the Boston University School of Medicine. In January 1897, delegates from the Alpha and Beta chapters met delegates from a similar society called Kappa Delta Upsilon, which had been established the month before at the Hahnemann Medical College of Philadelphia and was considering merging with Phi Alpha Gamma.

Phi Alpha Gamma held a Constitutional Convention at the Knickerbocker Athletic Club in New York City on January 26 and 27, 1897 where it adopted a national constitution and chartered Kappa Delta Upsilon as the Gamma chapter. At the convention, the fraternity also adopted the Kappa Delta Upsilon ritual as its own.

In 1897, the Delta and Epsilon chapters were formed by absorbing the two chapters of the local fraternity Pi Kappa Tau, established for students of homeopathic medicine. Eight additional chapters were chartered as various medical schools through 1906, for a total of thirteen chapters. By 1901, it was the largest medical fraternity in the United States. In October 1902, the Beta chapter opened its chapter house at 18 Worcester Square.

The Phi Alpha Gamma Quarterly publication was authorized at the fifth annual convention in 1900, with the first issue arriving in 1902 The fraternity published a directory in 1905 and 1920. It also published a history in 1912.

=== Merger with Phi Chi ===
In 1947, Phi Alpha Gamma was reduced to two active chapters: New York Medical College (Alpha) and Hahnemann Medical College (Gamma). Dr. Albert Saunders of Phi Chi Medical Fraternity worked on the preliminary details of an amalgamation between Phi Alpha Gamma and Phi Chi. At the Phi Chi National Convention of 1947, Saunders's proposal was approved with instructions to the Executive Trustees to complete the merger.

The merger of Phi Alpha Gamma with Phi Chi was completed on February 21, 1948. Phi Chi installed the New York Medical College chapter as Phi Alpha chapter and the Hahnemann Medical College chapter as Phi Alpha Gamma chapter.

Members of the Alpha Mu, Rho Delta, and Upsilon Sigma chapters of the Phi Chi Alumni Association met in New York City for its annual Founders' Day Banquet. During the banquet, Dr. Jacob E. Reisch initiated the 48 charter members of Phi Alpha and the seven charters members of the then-existing Gamma chapter, ceremonially completing the merger of Phi Alpha Gamma into Phi Chi.

== Symbols ==
The Phi Alpha Gamma badge was a middle phalanx from the little finger of a human hand, mounted in gold, with the letters ΦΑΓ in gold upon a field of black enamel. An amended pledge pin and badge were adopted at the seventeenth annual convention.

The fraternity's color was violet, and its flower was the violet.

== Members and governance ==
By 1914, the Phi Alpha Gamma had nearly 3,500 members. The fraternity had four classes of members: undergraduates, alumni, graduates, and honorary. It was overseen by a Grand Chapter that met each year at the fraternity's annual convention.

== Chapters ==
=== Collegiate chapters ===
Phi Alpha Gamma consisted of the following collegiate chapters. Inactive chapters and institutions are indicated in italics.

Chapter	Charter date and range	Institution	Location	Status	Ref.
Alpha	March 25, 1894 – February 21, 1948	New York Homeopathic Medical College	New York City, New York	Merged (ΦΧ)	(Note: Became Phi Alpha chapter of Phi Chi as part of a national merger of the two fraternities.)
Beta	November 26, 1896 – 1921	Boston University, School of Medicine	Boston, Massachusetts	Inactive	(Note: The chapter's charter was withdrawn by the fraternity. It was reestablished as the Beta Upsilon chapter of Phi Chi after the national merger of the two fraternities.)
Gamma	January 26, 1897 – February 21, 1948	Hahnemann Medical College and Hospital of Philadelphia	Philadelphia, Pennsylvania	Merged (ΦΧ)	(Note: Chapter was formed by absorbing Delta Kappa Upsilon (local), established in 1895. It became the Phi Alpha Gamma chapter of Phi Chi after the national merger of the two fraternities.)
Delta	May 24, 1897 – 1909	College of Homeopathic Medicine and Surgery, University of Minnesota	Minneapolis, Minnesota	Inactive	(Note: Chapter formed by absorbing Phi Kappa Tau (local), established in 1896.) (Note: Chapter went inactive when its school closed.)
Epsilon	November 13, 1897–1900; January 25, 1906 – 1919	Homeopathic Medical College, Iowa State University	Iowa City, Iowa	Inactive	(Note: Chapter's charter was withdrawn by the national fraternity but it was reinstated in 1906. However, the chapter went inactive again when Iowa closed its Homeopathy Medical College by forcing its merger with the university's medical school.)
Zeta	November 19, 1897 – 1900	Cleveland Homeopathic Medical College	Cleveland, Ohio	Consolidated	(Note: Zeta chapter and Theta chapter merged to form Zeta Theta chapter when Cleveland Homeopathic Medical College merged Pulte Medical College to form the Cleveland-Pulte Medical College.)
Eta	November 19, 1897 – January 3, 1909	Chicago Homeopathic Medical College	Chicago, Illinois	Consolidated	(Note: Eta chapter merged with Lambda chapter as Eta Lambda chapter with the amalgamation of Chicago Homeopathic Medical College and Hahnemann Medical College of Chicago.)
Theta	March 24, 1899 – 1900	Pulte Medical College	Cincinnati, Ohio	Consolidated	
Iota	March 19, 1899 – 1909	Homeopathic Medical College of Missouri	St. Louis, Missouri	Consolidated	(Note: Iota chapter consolidated with Nu chapter as Iota Nu chapter after the merger of Homeopathic Medical College of Missouri with Kansas City Hahnemann Medical College.)
Kappa	1900–1922	Homeopathic Medical College, University of Michigan	Ann Arbor, Michigan	Inactive	(Note: Chapter closed when the Homeopathic College merged with the University of Michigan Medical School.)
Lambda	1900 – January 3, 1909	Hahnemann Medical College of Chicago	Chicago, Illinois	Consolidated	(Note: Lambda chapter merged with Eta chapter as Eta Lambda chapter with the amalgamation of Chicago Homeopathic Medical College and Hahnemann Medical College of Chicago.)
Zeta Theta	1901–1922	Cleveland-Pulte Medical College	Cleveland, Ohio	Inactive	(Note: Zeta Theta)
Eta Lambda	January 3, 1909 – 1918	Hahnemann Medical College of Chicago	Chicago, Illinois	Inactive	(Note: Chapter formed as a merger of Eta chapter and Lambda chapter with the amalgamation of Chicago Homeopathic Medical College and Hahnemann Medical College of Chicago.)
Mu	1906–1915	Hahnemann Medical College of the Pacific	San Francisco, California	Inactive	(Note: Chapter went inactive when the school merged with the University of California.)
Nu	1906–1909	Kansas City Hahnemann Medical College	Kansas City, Missouri	Consolidated	
Iota Nu	1906–1916	Southwest School of Medicine and Hospital	Kansas City, Missouri	Inactive	

=== Alumni and graduate chapters ===
Chapter	Charter date and range	Location	Status	Ref.
Boston Alumni	1909–191x ?	Boston, Massachusetts	Inactive	
Buffalo Alumni	1909–19xx ?	Buffalo, New York	Inactive	
Chicago Alumni	1909–19xx ?	Chicago, Illinois	Inactive	
New York Alumni	1909–19xx ?	New York City, New York	Inactive	
Philadelphia Alumni	1910–19xx ?	Philadelphia, Pennsylvania	Inactive	
Rochester Alumni	1910–19xx ?	Rochester, New York	Inactive	
Cleveland Alumni	1911–19xx ?	Cleveland, Ohio	Inactive	
Pittsburgh Alumni	1912–19xx ?	Pittsburgh, Pennsylvania	Inactive	
Kansas City Alumni	1912–19xx ?	Kansas City, Missouri	Inactive	
Syracuse Alumni	1913–19xx ?	Syracuse, New York	Inactive	
Metropolitan Base Hospital No. 48 Alumni	c. 1917 – c. 1920	Mars-Sur-Allier, Nievre, France	Inactive	(Note: Members of the New York Alumni chapter formed this chapter in France during World War I.)
Providence Alumni	191x ?–19xx ?	Providence, Rhode Island	Inactive	
Central Iowa Alumni	191x ?–19xx ?	Iowa City, Iowa	Inactive	
Central Ohio Alumni	191x ?–19xx ?	Cincinnati, Ohio	Inactive	
Northern Ohio Alumni	191x ?–19xx ?	Cleveland, Ohio	Inactive	
Michigan Alumni	191x ?–19xx ?	Michigan	Inactive	
Wisconsin Alumni	191x ?–192x ?	Wisconsin	Inactive	
Los Angeles Alumni	192x ?–19xx ?	Los Angeles, California	Inactive	

== See also ==
- Professional fraternities and sororities
