= WVWC =

Coordinates: 38.990°N 80.219°W

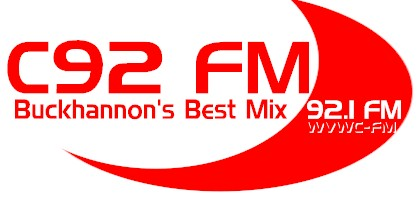
- Buckhannon, West Virginia; United States
- Broadcast area: Buckhannon, West Virginia
- Frequency: 92.1 MHz
- Branding: C-92 FM

Programming
- Format: Adult contemporary

Ownership
- Owner: West Virginia Wesleyan College

History
- First air date: 1982
- Last air date: 2025
- Call sign meaning: West Virginia Wesleyan College

Technical information
- Licensing authority: FCC
- Facility ID: 71674
- Class: D
- ERP: 13 watts
- HAAT: −21 meters (−69 ft)

Links
- Public license information: Public file; LMS
- Website: www.wvwc.edu/programs/communication/radio/

WVWC was an adult contemporary formatted broadcast radio station licensed to and serving Buckhannon, West Virginia, United States. WVWC was owned and operated by West Virginia Wesleyan College.

== History ==
The first iteration of WVWC was a 14,000 watt public radio station founded in 1968. In 1975, West Virginia Wesleyan College agreed to sell the station to the new West Virginia Public Radio Network, and its call sign was changed to WVPW. In 1999, WVWC went to a 24-hour format for the first time in the station's history. The station used voice tracking and an automated system to stay on the air. Summer 2000 was the first summer that C92 was on the air over the summer break, run with a skeleton crew. Over this time the station was managed by Damian Little, a student at WVWC who made C92 sound very commercial, with produced bumpers, IDs and jingles. The live internet stream was added in 1999.

Little was the voice talent for C92 from late 1999 until 2000, was on air from 1999 to 2004 and was general manager from 2000 to 2003.

In early fall 2000, the station's original transmitter caught fire and was distorted, putting the station off the air for two weeks. It was relaunched as C92FM Buckhannon's Best Mix with a new voice-over talent, Dude Walker. The station's new sound was very popular with the local population.

C92FM was in the Buckhannon Strawberry festival parade in 2003.

West Virginia Wesleyan College surrendered the WVWC license in July 2025.
