= Hahnemann Medical College of the Pacific =

Medical school in San Francisco, California

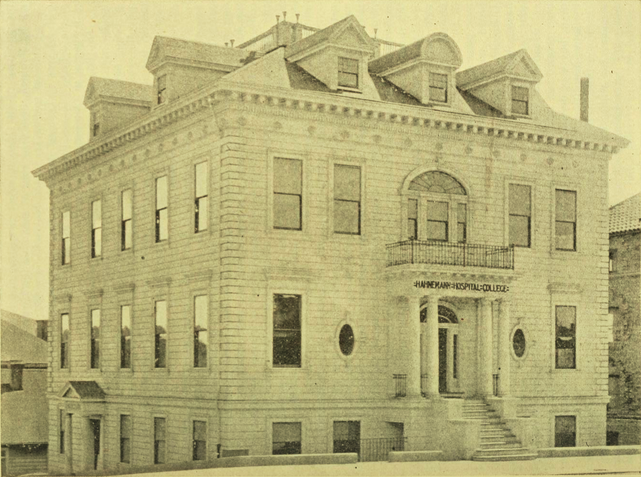
- (1905)
- Former names: Hahnemann Medical College; Hahnemann Hospital College of San Francisco
- Type: Homeopathic medical school
- Active: 1881–1915 when it amalgamated with University of California San Francisco School of Medicine
- Parent institution: American Institute of Homeopathy. Council on Medical Education.
- Affiliations: Hahnemann Hospital, San Francisco
- Location: San Francisco, California; 37.786951°N 122.455552°W

Hahnemann Medical College of the Pacific was a homeopathic medical school in San Francisco, California. It was established in 1881 as Hahnemann Medical College, with the first graduating class in 1884. During the period of 1888–1902, it was known as Hahnemann Hospital College of San Francisco. Its last name change, 1902–1915, was to Hahnemann Medical College of the Pacific.

In 1884, the college was first located at the corner of Stockton Street and Geary Street, but it moved before the end of the year to No. 115 Haight Street. A new four-story building was erected in 1899, costing US$10,000, on a lot of about equal value, situated at the corner of Sacramento and Maple streets. In 1915, the college merged with University of California San Francisco School of Medicine.

The standard for graduation was kept at 75% for years, and eventually, the tendency was to be more strict in the requirements for graduation. Higher requirements for admission were also implemented. When the subject of women's admission was broached, a motion was passed that women should be admitted on an equal footing with men to all the privileges of the college. Early in the College's career, co-education was strengthened by the appointment of woman clinical assistants, lecturers and professors.

Since the college's foundation in 1881, it was the institution behind the homeopathic branch of medicine in the State of California, graduating 309 men and women. It did so with little support in the way of gifts and endowments as compared to other medical colleges on the Pacific coast. The medical education received there being up-to-date, the State rewarded the college by recognizing its graduates as eligible to become licensed physicians.

== Establishment (1881-1883) ==
The Hahnemann Medical College of the Pacific was the outgrowth of urgent needs in the west, understood best by those pioneers of homoeopathy who located here in 1850. The geographical isolation and distance from local centers demanded the establishment of a special school for the teaching of homoeopathy on this Pacific coast.

On January 12, 1881, the first meeting directed toward the creation of this college was held "for the purpose of founding and establishing a homoeopathic college in San Francisco and incorporating under the law as made and provided in the state of California." To forward this object, nine trustees were elected. This institution chose the name of the Hahnemann Medical College of San Francisco and the corporation was to exist for 50 years. The date for beginning the first course of lectures was June 1882.

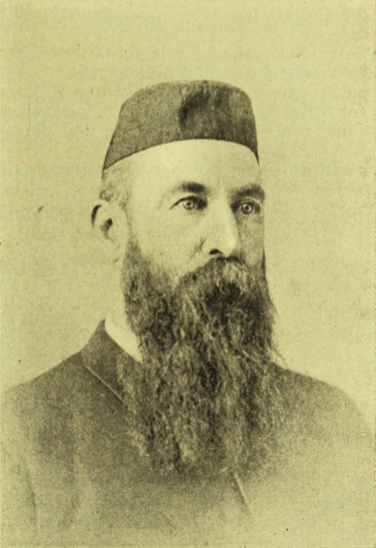
C. B. Currier, M.D.

Monthly meetings were held until July 6, 1881. Because of the discouraging financial and professional interest exhibited, it was not until two years thereafter, March 27, 1883, that five of the directors again assembled. An urgent invitation was called out to every homoeopathic physician interested to meet the directors at the next meeting. Drs. F. É. J. Canney, J. N. Eckel, C. B. Currier and Dr. William Boericke were associated with the cause in the early years.

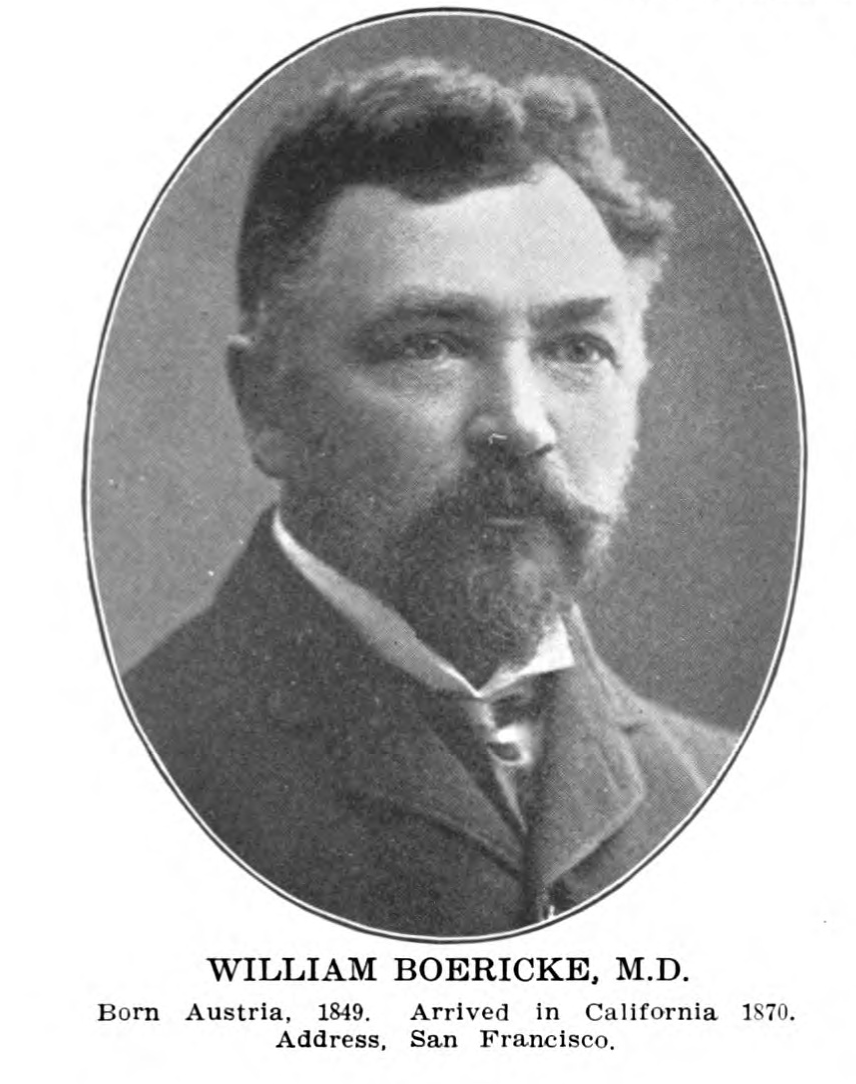
William Boericke, M.D.

In July 1883, though not in compliance with the law until January 1884, US$5,000 capital stock was increased to US$25,000, and the number of the directors was fixed at nine. At this time there appeared in the July, 1883, issue of the California Homoeopath an editorial written by its editor, Dr. William Boericke, clearly reaching out for aid from a united profession. This letter and the consequent subscription to the stock was the beginning of the college.

In March 1884, by resolution, the unsold stock was taken up by the directors of the college, who again filled the breach. On September 25, 1883, the first faculty meeting was called at 209 Powell street. By the unanimous vote of the faculty, Dr. C. B. Currier was elected dean, and with the exception of a couple of years, he served in that capacity for eleven years. By him was conceived the idea for the erection of a new building and by him, plans were formed for the same, but for lack of help from professional friends it was not consummated during his service. The college now chose for its home the building formerly occupied by the university college and built for a Baptist church, on the corner of Stockton and Geary streets. According to a resolution passed at that time, the faculty were to serve without remuneration and that resolution never was repealed.

== First lectures (1884-1886) ==
The Hahnemann Medical College of San Francisco began its first course of lectures on June 3, 1884, to continue five months. A class of sixteen students matriculated. The college was soon removed to No. 115 Haight street, to a building formerly used by the medical department of the University of the Pacific. Here, the home of the college passed from hydropathy to allopathy and from allopathy to homoeopathy. For fifteen years, the college made its home on Haight street, in a building ill-adapted for college work. The class was composed of those who were entering college for the first year and by others who by necessity were compelled to go to other medical colleges in San Francisco, there being no homeopathic institutions. Having admitted such, it permitted a senior class to be formed and a graduation to take place at the close of the year. Preliminary to the opening, a dispensary, long in existence and known as the Pacific Homoeopathic Dispensary, was affiliated with the college and thereby afforded clinical opportunity to the students which they could have received in no other way.

On March 17, 1884, a gift of twenty volumes of medical works by Dr. John Nicolas Eckel formed the nucleus of a library, which numbered several thousand volumes by 1905. Afterward, Dr. Eckel supplemented his original gift, and material additions were made through funds furnished by the faculty in 1887 and by gifts from doctors and others who, in these early days, added these gifts year after year and so created a substantial basis for a library.

The first graduation of the Hahnemann Medical College occurred in October 1884. Effort was made at this time to obtain clinical facilities at the city and county hospital, but notwithstanding the consent of the board of supervisors, the municipal medical authorities denied the privilege.

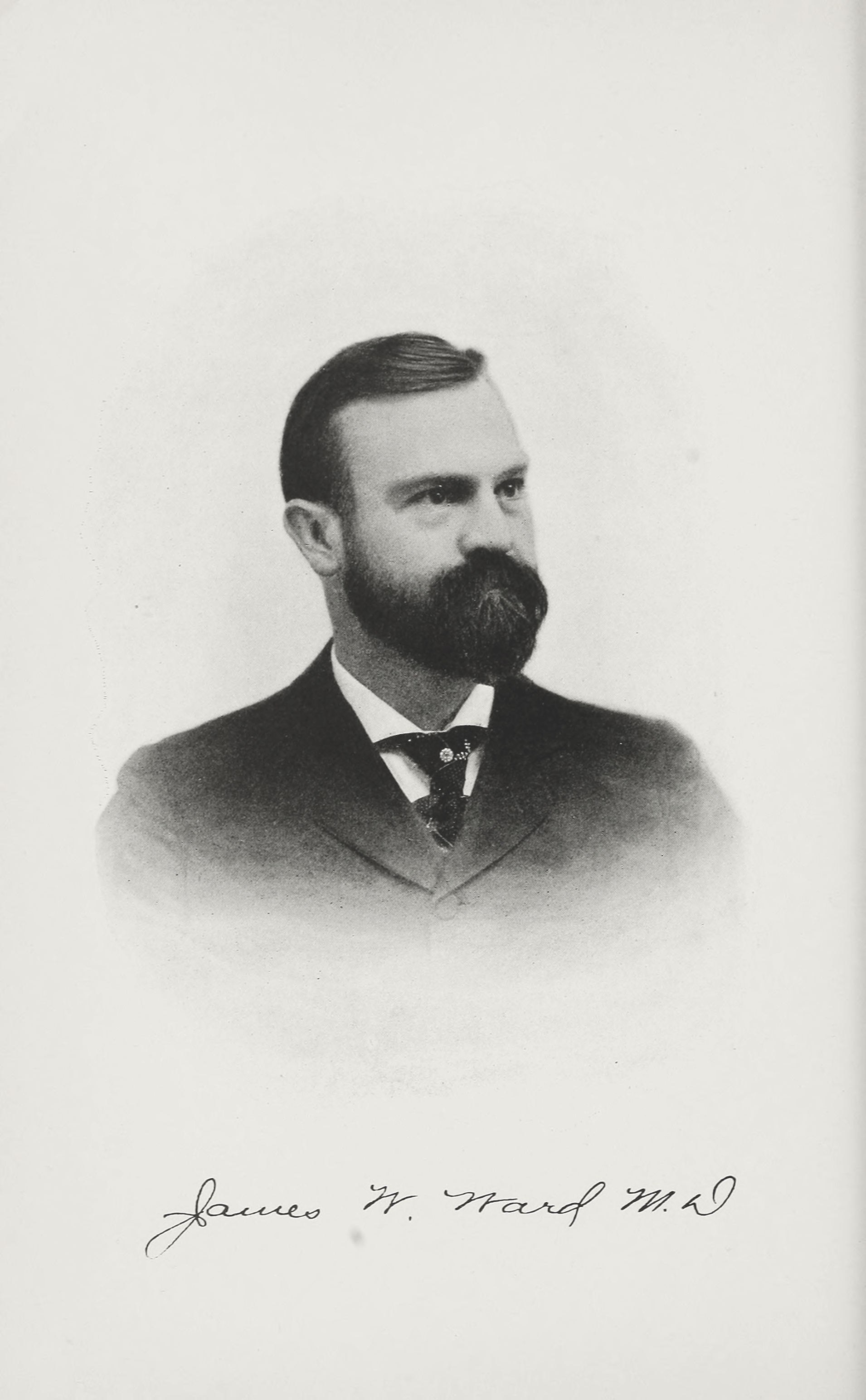
James W. Ward, M.D.

The graduating class of 1885 consisted of four students. As early as this date, a committee was appointed to select a building site for the college. This, however, never materialized.

In 1886, the first delegates to the international committee of the American Institute of Homoeopathy were chosen, consisting of Drs. Boericke and French. During 1885 and 1886, the institution passed through one of those severe professional trials common to young institutions and in sections where professional strife is possible. It arose upon the granting of a pro honore diploma, which caused a break in the faculty and several resignations.

== Hospital development (1887-1890) ==
Early in 1887, the college developed its first hospital enterprise, established in a very modest way a few beds in a small cottage on Sacramento street. It became necessary in order to develop a hospital to change the title of the college and to form a corporation called the "Hahnemann Hospital College of San Francisco". Immediately upon the organization on December 2, 1887, the stock of the Hahnemann Medical College of San Francisco was turned over to the new board and the institution under its new name commenced life, which continued for several years.

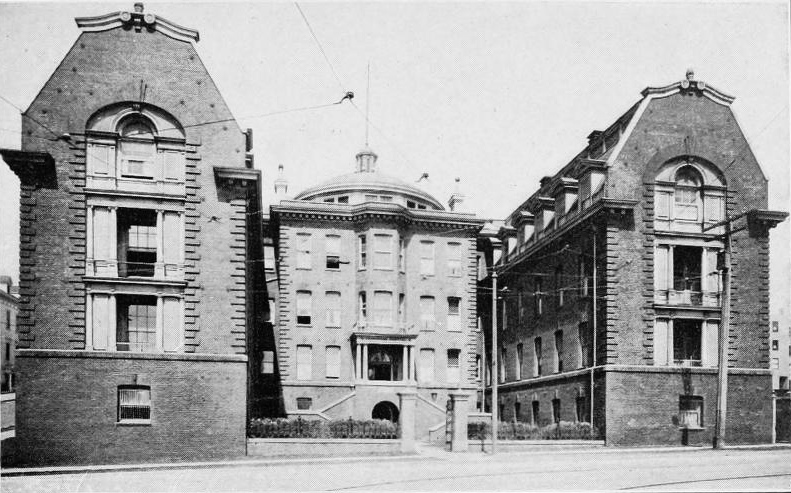
Hahnemann Hospital, San Francisco (1916)

The next step in development of better hospital facilities was the moving of the hospital to Paige street, in 1888, within two blocks of the college, thus affording better opportunities for clinical demonstration. The internal strife which had lasted for some time in the college, the lack of support from professional men throughout the state, the assessment upon the college stock and the constant financial depletion of its professors, caused a dissension within the faculty concerning the propriety of maintaining the hospital. This was increased by the antagonism raised in the vicinity of the hospital by declaring it a nuisance and the arrest and imprisonment of its superintendent, Dr. Ward. His arrest was instituted on the ground of an ordinance which the supervisors of the city and county of San Francisco had enacted, prohibiting the establishment or maintenance of hospitals within certain distances of the city hall. Dr. Ward carried the suit to the Supreme court where the ordinance was found defective and the proceedings were dismissed. A difference of opinion as to the policy of suppressing the hospital became so active, maintained to be absolutely essential by Drs. Ward and James Lilienthal, that they resigned rather than to give consent to the doing away with the clinical arm of the college. It was then closed.

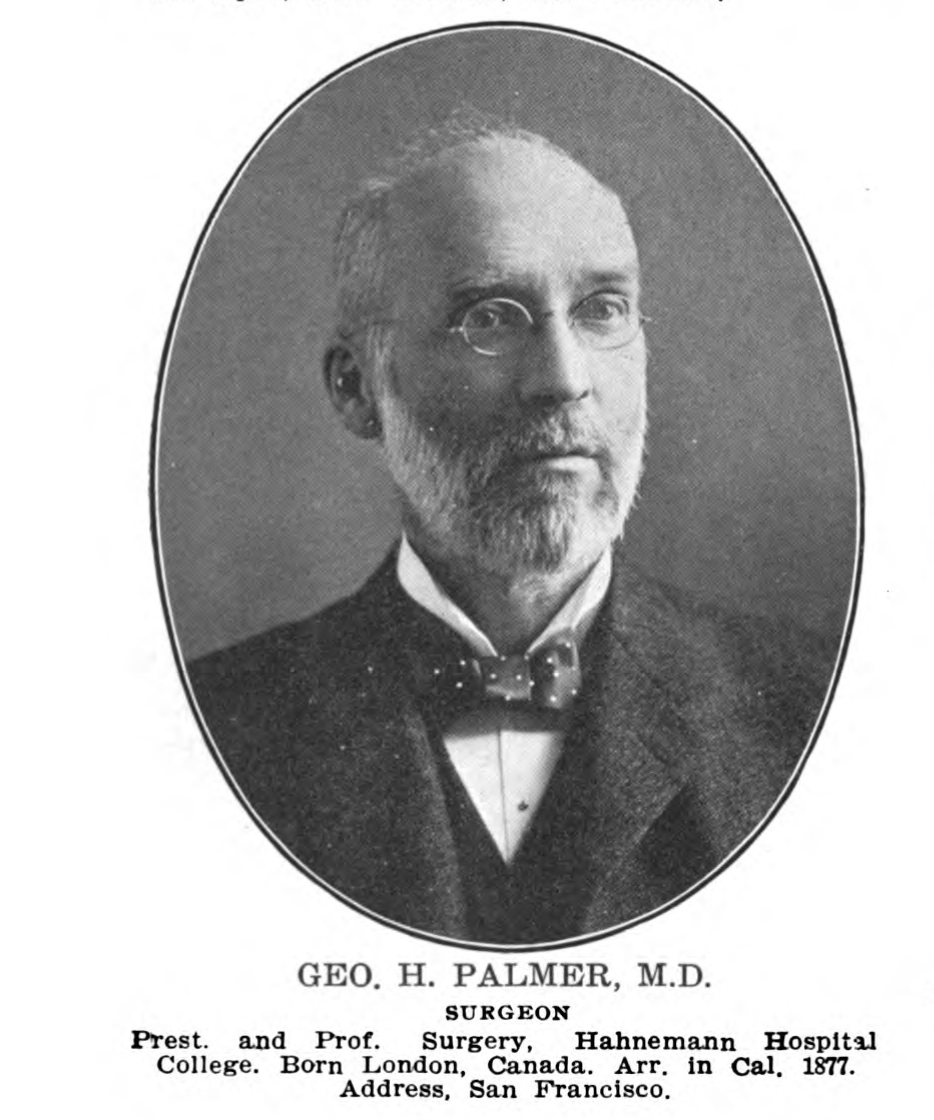
George H. Palmer, M.D.

Dr. George H. Palmer resigned at this time. The senior class became dissatisfied with the retrenching policy of the new board of trustees, and because of the leaving from the faculty of several of its best teachers, felt it incumbent upon themselves to leave the institution as students and to complete their course in medicine at Hahnemann Medical College, Chicago.

== Growth (1891-1898) ==
In 1891, legal questions of incorporation were raised, and in order to fulfill conditions of law regarding the Hahnemann Hospital College of San Francisco, papers were again taken out. The graduating exercises were held on December 10, 1891.

During 1892, the trustees and faculty desired to do something toward obtaining a permanent home and thereby advancing homoeopathy. The former desire caused inquiries to be made toward the purchase of the theological seminary building on Haight street, and also the property occupied by the college. Endeavors were made to raise funds, all of which did not succeed, so that the lease of the former quarters was renewed. Toward the advancement of homoeopathy, a petition was presented to the board of health for a ward in the city and county hospital, while articles were written for the papers, but all to no purpose. Then was first suggested the plan for affiliation with the state university. Commencement exercises took place December 1, with a class of eight.

The year 1893 was marked by many changes in the board and faculty. Financial affairs were not good, and it was necessary to levy an assessment on the stock, which helped to straighten out the condition. Dr. Currier was again placed as dean, and Dr. Boericke became registrar. Numerous faculty changes occurred. The library was increased by 50 volumes. The graduating exercises were held on November 18, and degrees were conferred upon a class of sevén.

The year 1894 showed fewer changes, and matters moved more smoothly than for some time. As delegates to the intercollegiate association of the American Institute of Homeopathy which met at Denver, Drs. Simpson and Boericke were appointed. It was at this time that Dr. Boericke and others from the west endeavored to show that a four years' course would be detrimental to the interest and growth of small colleges, but the institute decided to advise such a course, and this college at once inaugurated such a course, of seven months each, to begin with the next session. This was to its credit, and was in advance of the action of the eastern colleges.

The homoeopathic hospital having closed its doors some time previous, many plans were suggested for raising funds for the erection of a hospital building. Again the subject of the college owning its own building was discussed and some plans were suggested looking to the purchase of the Haight street property, but it was found that it could not be obtained, thus ending the discussion for all time. A class of twelve graduated November 30, 1894. It was then decided that a fall term should be re-established, to be begun in October of the next year.

In 1895, a new governor having come into office and his leanings being toward homoeopathy, he was petitioned for a homoeopathic representative on the board of health, but it was decided against the college for fear of "disagreements in the board." A new charter for the city of San Francisco was now being drawn up for the forthcoming election. Among the freeholders elected to form this charter were three outspoken friends of homoeopathy, all patients of Dr. Ward, through whose influence they gave their support in order that nothing should be inserted in the charter departing from the lines of liberal medicine. Earnest effort was then made by old school colleges of the city to designate the institutions to supply interns to the city and county hospital. The three freeholders, through efforts of the chairman, prevented any infringement upon the rights of the homoeopathic school. This laid the foundation for the prosperity in municipal recognition.

College and hospital plans were again suggested, and a committee was appointed to select a site for a new college and hospital. Early in 1895 was chosen the lot on the corner of Sacramento and Maple streets, and an assessment upon the capital stock paid for it. Dr. Lilienthal was appointed a delegate to the inter-collegiate association. On August 29, the graduating exercises took place with a class of thirteen. The semester opened early in October, 1895. Meanwhile "The Little Jim Ward" at the Children's Hospital having been erected, an offer was made by the college to take charge of a portion of it, but was declined, as well as another request for some other ward in the same institution.

For a time in 1896, it seemed as if the college would have to discontinue sessions, for while the classes were large, the financial condition was poor, and many were losing their interest in its affairs. True, the site had been selected for a new college, but the assessments were not met with favor. The winter term closed April 29, 1896, with a class of eleven. Soon it became necessary to prepare for the announcement and the selection of a faculty for the coming year. Many plans arose; some favored the closing of the college for two years, others favored moving, and still others advocated an assessment. Many of the old members of the faculty resigned, so that with a new board, new officers and almost a new faculty, the term began on September 30, 1896. The college expenses were reduced wherever practicable, and as far as could be economical measures were employed.

Very early in 1897, an endeavor was made toward the plan of affiliation with the state university. A petition and strong resolutions were drawn up and presented to the board of regents, proposing such affiliation, and a committee was appointed to attend to the matter. This committee, with prominent laymen, worked hard for the success of the plan. The allopaths, by their county societies, individual members, resolutions, influence and other means worked to defeat the proposition. Although it was held in abeyance for some months by the regents, of whom the governor and several regents were homoeopaths and favorable, and although arguments from both sides were listened to and considered, the proposition was defeated "for economic reasons." Such defeat failed to discourage and in fact seemed to stimulate, for from this time on, the thoughts centered upon a home of their own. This decision of the regents did not take place until August 1897. Meanwhile, on April 29 a class of nineteen-the largest in the history of the institution— was graduated. At the July meeting of the trustees, the suggestion to move was deemed unwise at the time, and it was decided to hold one more year at "the old stand," so the term was opened October 13, 1897.

The 1898 graduating class was small, being the first class under the four years' course. It consisted of two members. The current debts were met by an assessment on stockholders.

== New construction (1899-1905) ==
The course was again changed in 1899 from winter to summer (July to February), as having special advantages in the climate. During 1899, the building and its construction was on everyone's mind. On May 4, the last class to graduate in the old building, occupied since 1884, completed its course, and three graduates received the degree of M. D. The cornerstone of the college had been laid on February 4, and on July 25, dedicatory exercises were held, marking the opening of the seventeenth session. On the next day, the faculty began lectures. George Lang, the contractor of the college, was an ardent homoeopath and refused to accept remuneration for his work. Through him, the building was erected for US$10,000.

The dean, during 1900, visited the various medical colleges of the country in the view of obtaining knowledge of the system of record books and card systems in vogue. From that experience, a complete plan was created. Application was made to the regents of the University of the State of New York to become accredited and registered with them, and by conforming with the exactions of that body, this was accomplished. The sessions of 1900, 1901, 1902 and 1903 were held during early spring until late fall. A minimum of seven months had always been the plan of the college. In 1903, a change was again made to the winter season, conforming with the usage obtaining in eastern colleges from autumn to late spring.

In 1900, Dr. William Boericke, owner of the Pacific Coast Journal of Homoeopathy, gave to the college the journal, since which time it continued to edit and maintain a larger monthly periodical. The aim of this journal was the united effort to give to the profession of the Pacific states a journal worthy of the profession which it represents and the official organ of the college which supports it. Since 1901, the students of the college edited and supported a journal known as The Periscope. The object was to encourage independent and original thought among students, besides the acquisition of a larger power of expression on medical subjects. The class body controlled its publication under the supervision of the dean of the faculty. Three issues were produced yearly.

In the fall of 1901, Eugene Schmitz was elected mayor of San Francisco. For the first time in the municipal history of the city, as an ardent homoeopath, he appointed as a health commissioner Dr. James W. Ward, representing the homoeopathic school, for four years of service. At his re-election in 1903, it became possible through absolute control of the department of health of the city and county of San Francisco, and by the election of Dr. Ward, president of the commission, to assign the homoeopathic school its representation in the various departments. Accordingly, in January, 1904, the Hahnemann Medical College of the Pacific was assigned two wards in the city and county hospital.

In 1903, the college became registered and accredited with the Illinois and the Michigan state boards of health, making exactions to the curriculum to conform with the requirements of these boards. During the changes necessary from the summer to the winter courses, which was inspired mainly by the difficulty in acquiring students, the college suffered in the numbers of its college body. From 1900 to 1905, inclusive, the average number of students graduated was ten. The exactions of the state board of health, the operation of which law went into effect in 1903, compelled the college to prolong its lecture courses in order that at least six months of teaching should be found within each calendar year, as separate courses. The changing of the time of its sessions exacted from this institution that it should either close one year entirely or operate its sessions through prolonged months. Accordingly it was found best to extend the course of 1903-1904, and again for the sessions of 1904-1905.

In 1903, the first step was begun toward the creation of the Hahnemann Hospital. While the Hahnemann Hospital movement as a part of the general hospital movement had a history of its own, it nevertheless bore such close relationship to the college as to be accorded a place in the history of college progress. It was in anticipation of the Hahnemann Hospital that in 1902 the college, realizing that its charter did not include the right to maintain a training school for nurses and ability to grant diplomas for the same, that a new corporation was formed on a non-stock basis, and known as the Hahnemann Medical College of the Pacific. The Hahnemann Hospital College gave up its charter and bestowed its holdings to the corporation bearing this name. On March 14, 1905, the contract for the building of the Hahnemann was signed and on May 31, the cornerstone of the hospital was laid.

The Mu chapter of the Phi Alpha Gamma fraternity was installed at the college in 1905.

== Amalgamation with the UCSF School of Medicine (1915-1919) ==
After many conferences between the University of California San Francisco, the University Medical School, and the Hahnemann Medical College of the Pacific, an agreement was signed in 1915 making the latter a part of the medical department of the University of California. The plan secures the condition that the two schools of medicine were placed upon an equal footing in regard to materia medica, clinical medicine and homoeopathic therapeutics. The students could take either course and have equal rank and receive the same degree. It was in reality creating a department which would have the same standing as other departments in the University Medical School.

In 1915, plans were consummated for an arrangement whereby the Hahnemann Medical College of the Pacific should convey its real property to the UCSF Regents, the homeopathic hospital, however, remaining in the ownership of the present corporation, the Hahnemann Medical College to cease instruction after three years, and to provide for two years for the maintenance of two chairs, one in homeopathic materia medica and one in homeopathic therapeutics, in the University of California Medical School, the instruction to be offered by the holders of these two chairs to be an elective open to any students of the University of California Medical School. The matter first came before the Board on March 9, 1915. This matter was consummated through approval on June 8, 1915 with the representatives of the Hahnemann Medical College of the Pacific having agreed that they will provide for the cost of maintaining the two chairs until June 30, 1917. The work of the first year and a half was given at University of California, Berkeley and that of the last two and one-half years at University of California, San Francisco.

The union of the said Hahnemann Medical College of the Pacific and the University of California Medical School was consummated upon July 1, 1918. Inasmuch as the University of California accepted the physical assets of the Hahnemann Medical College of the Pacific, and continued the teaching formerly given by that College by the establishment of a Department of Homeopathic Instruction in its regular curriculum, it the Faculty of the University of California Medical School notified each graduate of the Hahnemann Medical College of the Pacific of this fact, and requested him to look upon the Homeopathic Section of the Department of Medicine in the University of California Medical School as the continuation of his Alma Mater. It was thus seen that the 309 Hahnemann graduates were recognized as a part of the alumni of the University of California. On March 1, 1919, the Hahnemann Hospital passed into the hands of the University of California. The college's Homeopathic Library, containing 2,000 volumes, was moved to UCSF's Galen Building, now held by the UCSF Library.
