= Floyd Farnsworth =

American politician (1869–1946)

Dr. Floyd Forney "F.F." Farnsworth (2 April 1869 – 2 January 1946) was a West Virginia state legislator, state health official, physician, and author. In the years before antibiotics were available to treat venereal diseases, he worked to stem the spread of the diseases in his state. He helped establish the West Virginia Department of Health, where he served as Director of the Bureau of Venereal Diseases, and he sought to use his fiction to educate the public about the increasing prevalence and tragic results of syphilis.

Farnsworth was born in Upshur County, West Virginia, in or near Buckhannon, a son of Franklin Leonard Farnsworth and Martha Jane (Currence) Farnsworth. He was educated in the local schools and, on October 25, 1890, married Lasora Martin of Holly Grove, West Virginia. He graduated from Buckhannon Union College in 1897 and then taught in the Buckhannon schools, advancing to the positions of principal and, finally, superintendent. He received a degree in medicine from Maryland Medical College in 1904 and, in the same year, began a medical practice in French Creek, West Virginia.

Farnworth was elected to the West Virginia House of Delegates in 1912. In 1913, he collaborated with Dr. Henry D. Hatfield, who was then governor-elect, to introduce a bill that strengthened the West Virginia Board of Health. The bill increased the appropriation to the Board, enabling the Board to retain its secretary as a full-time official, establish a laboratory, and launch programs in public health education.

During World War I, Dr. Farnsworth joined the Medical Corps of the United States Army and was stationed in Charleston, West Virginia, where he was in charge of the second-draft examinations. From 1919 to 1922, he served as Director of the Bureau of Venereal Diseases in the West Virginia Department of Health, under the auspices of the U.S. Public Health Service. In that capacity, he oversaw the establishment of venereal disease clinics throughout the state.

In 1922, he opened a medical practice in Milton, West Virginia, which he maintained for at least 18 years before his death.

Dr. Farnsworth wrote two works of fiction and one memoir. His first work of fiction, Doctor Terrell Investigates and Other Writings, was published in 1920. It has been called "both amusing and instructive." According to WorldCat, the book is held in 8 libraries

His second work of fiction, The Man on Horseback: A Story of Life among the West Virginia Hills, published in 1921, had the serious intent of instructing young West Virginians in how to cope with social changes that were taking place in the state. The novel is set mainly in Altoona, a fictitious village near Buckhannon, and explores the effects of alcohol abuse, prostitution, and venereal disease around the time of the World War I. According to WorldCat, the book is held in 11 libraries

Dr. Farnsworth's memoir, The Saga of a Country Doctor among the West Virginia Hills, was included in a collection of memoirs.

Dr. Farnsworth died in Milton, Cabell County, West Virginia.

== Works ==
- Doctor Terrell Investigates and Other Writings. Charleston, W.Va.: Tribune Printing Company, 1920.
- The Man on Horseback: A Story of Life among the West Virginia Hills. Charleston, W.Va.:Tribune Printing Company, 1921.
- The Saga of a Country Doctor among the West Virginia Hills. 1940(?)
