= Pi Mu =

American medical student honor society (1892–1922)

- ΠΜ
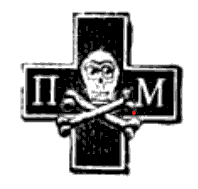
- Pi Mu badge
- Founded: December 13, 1892; 133 years ago University of Virginia
- Type: Honor
- Affiliation: Independent
- Status: Merged
- Merge date: 1922
- Successor: Phi Chi medical fraternity
- Emphasis: Medicine
- Scope: National
- Motto: Semper Ad Honorem
- Publication: The Journal; Cerebrum
- Chapters: 17
- Members: 1,500 lifetime
- Headquarters: United States
- Website: www.phichimed.org

Pi Mu (ΠΜ) was an honor society for medical students. It was founded at the University of Virginia in 1892. It merged with Phi Chi, a similar society, in 1922.

== History ==
Pi Mu was an honor society for medical students that was founded on December 13, 1892 at the University of Virginia. Dr. John Mallet, a faculty member at the university, designed the fraternity's name and motto. Its founders were:

- Hugh I. Cummings
- Hugh H. Duke
- Powell C. Fauntleroy
- E. L. Hobson
- James S. Irving
- John W. Mallet
- Charles E. Marrow
- Rawley Martin
- Hugh T. McGuire
- Rawley Penick
- Nicholas Worthington

The next year, the Beta chapter was established at the Medical College of Virginia. A third chapter was chartered at the University College of Medicine in 1896 but Beta and Gamma chapters consolidated to form Beta Gamma chapter later that year.

In November 1921, Dave F. Dozier of Phi Chi Medical Fraternity and J. P. Williams of Pi Mu began unofficial negotiations for a merger of the two fraternities. Their discussions culminated in an agreement of merger signed October 7, 1922, in Richmond, Virginia, by Albert F. Saunders for Phi Chi and J. Blair Fitts for Pi Mu. Also participating in the arrangements of the merger were Dozier and William I. Owens, Theta Eta chapter for Phi Chi and Williams of Pi Mu. At the time of the merger, Pi Mu had initiated some 1,500 members.

Under the terms of the merger, members of the Beta and Gamma chapters of Pi Mu were initiated into the Theta Eta chapter of Phi Chi. The Alpha chapter of Pi Mu was installed as the Pi Mu chapter of Phi Chi on October 14, 1922. Alumni of Pi Mu became associate members of the Pi Mu chapter of Phi Chi and were obligated to become life subscribers to the Phi Chi QUARTERLY; Phi Chi membership cards were issued to those who so subscribed. These associate members were granted the right to wear the badge of Phi Chi although the Pi Mu official badge was to remain "official" for all Pi Mu alumni graduating before July 1, 1922.

Through this amalgamation, Phi Chi received all of the Pi Mu interests and could accept any part of its ritual and constitution. Phi Chi also agreed to sponsor the Pi Mu honor system.

== Symbols ==
The motto of Pi Mu is Semper Ad Honorem. The crest of Pi Mu was a caduceus at the top of a shield with the Latin phrase Semper Ad Honorem and the Greek letters beneath.

The Pi Mu badge was a Greek cross with a skull and bones at the center. The skull was set with emerald eyes and the letters ΠΜ displayed on the horizontal arm of the cross. The design of the Phi Chi pledge button was changed at the time of the Pi Mu merger in 1922 to honor the Pi Mu honor system. The badge of Pi Mu, a Greek cross carrying the skull and crossbones in addition to the Greek letters ΠΜ, by agreement became Phi Chi's pledge button with the substitution of a caduceus and the letters ΦΧ in silver on a field of green.

The fraternity's annual publication was The Journal which was begun in 1908. Its journal was Cerebrum.

== Chapters ==
Pi Mu consisted of the following chapters Inactive chapters and institutions are indicated in italics.

| Chapter | Charter date and range | Institution | Location | Status | Ref. |
|---|---|---|---|---|---|
| Alpha | December 13, 1892 – 1904; 1908–1922 | University of Virginia | Charlottesville, Virginia | Merged (ΦΧ) | (Note: Chapter became the Pi Mu chapter of Phi Chi as part of the national merger of the two fraternities.) |
| Beta | 1893–1896 | Medical College of Virginia | Richmond, Virginia | Consolidated (ΒΓ) | (Note: Beta and Gamma consolidated to form Beta Gamma chapter.) |
| Gamma | 1896 | University College of Medicine | Richmond, Virginia | Consolidated (ΒΓ) | |
| Beta Gamma | 1896–1922 | University College of Medicine | Richmond, Virginia | Merged (ΦΧ) | (Note: Chapter joined the Theta Eta chapter of Phi Chi as part of the national merger of the two fraternities.) |
| Delta | 1904–1907 | Louisville Medical College | Louisville, Kentucky | Consolidated (ΔΗ) | (Note: Delta and Eta consolidated to form Delta Eta chapter.) |
| Epsilon | 1904–1907 | University of Louisville | Louisville, Kentucky | Consolidated (ΕΖ) | (Note: Epsilon and Zeta consolidated to form Epsilon Zeta chapter.) |
| Zeta | 1905–1907 | University of Kentucky | Lexington, Kentucky | Consolidated (ΕΖ) | |
| Eta | 1907 | Hospital College of Medicine | Louisville, Kentucky | Consolidated (ΔΗ) | |
| Delta Eta | 1907–1908 | Louisville Medical College | Louisville, Kentucky | Consolidated (ΔΕ) | (Note: Delta Eta and Epsilon Zeta consolidated to form Delta Epsilon chapter.) |
| Epsilon Zeta | 1907–1908 | University of Louisville | Louisville, Kentucky | Consolidated (ΔΕ) | |
| Delta Epsilon | 1908–1922 | University of Louisville | Louisville, Kentucky | Merged (ΦΧ) | (Note: Chapter joined the Alpha Alpha chapter of Phi Chi as part of the national merger of the two fraternities.) |
| Theta | 1908–1915 | Jefferson Medical College | Philadelphia, Pennsylvania | Inactive | |
| Iota | 1908–1914 | Medical College of South Carolina | Charleston, South Carolina | Inactive | |
| Kappa | 1908–1922 | University of Tennessee | Knoxville, Tennessee | Merged (ΦΧ) | (Note: Chapter joined the Alpha Beta chapter of Phi Chi as part of the national merger of the two fraternities.) |
| Lambda | 1910–1922 | Vanderbilt University | Nashville, Tennessee | Merged (ΦΧ) | (Note: Chapter joined the Pi chapter of Phi Chi as part of the national merger of the two fraternities.) |
| Mu | 1910–1922 | Johns Hopkins University | Baltimore, Maryland | Merged (ΦΧ) | (Note: Chapter joined the Kappa Delta chapter of Phi Chi as part of the national merger of the two fraternities.) |
| Nu | 1913–1922 | Columbia University | New York City, New York | Merged (ΦΧ) | (Note: Chapter joined the Upsilon Sigma chapter of Phi Chi as part of the national merger of the two fraternities.) |
