= Pierre Charles Huguier =

French surgeon and gynecologist (1804–1873)

Pierre Charles Huguier (4 September 1804 – 12 January 1873) was a French surgeon and gynecologist born in Sézanne.

In 1834 he received his medical doctorate at Paris, and was later a surgeon at the Hôpital Beaujon. In 1835 he became an associate professor of the faculty of medicine at Paris.

Huguier is remembered for his pioneer work with genitourinary diseases such as lymphogranuloma venereum and uterine fibroma, with the latter disorder being formerly referred to as "Huguier's disease". He provided an early description of the anastomosis around the isthmus of the uterus, which is sometimes referred to as "Huguier's circle". His name is also lent to two anatomical structures associated with the ear:

- "Huguier's canal", or the "anterior canaliculus of chorda tympani": A canal at the medial end of the petrotympanic fissure, through which the chorda tympani nerve exits the tympanic cavity. Also known as the "canal of Huguier", or "iter chordae anterius".
- "Huguier's sinus": or the "fossula fenestrae vestibuli": A depression on the medial wall of the middle ear which has the vestibular window in its lower portion. Also called the little fossa of the vestibular window.

He is also credited with development of a specialized hysterometer (uterine sound).

== Selected writings ==
- Des opérations de pupille artificielle, 1841.
- Mémoire sur les kystes de la matrice et sur les kystes folliculaires du vagin. Lu à la Société de Chirurgie le 5 May 1847.
- Mémoire sur l'esthiomène, ou darte rongeante de la région vulvo-anale. Extrait du tome XIV des Mémoires d l'Académie Nationale de Médecine. 1849.
- Mémoire sur les maladies des appareils sécréteurs des organes génitaux externes de la femme. Extrait des Mémoires de l'Academie Nationale de Médecine. 1850.
- Mémoire sur les appareils sécréteurs des organes génitaux externes chez la femme et chez les animaux. Extrait des Annales des Sciences Naturelles, April 1850.
- Traitement des kystes de l'ovaire, 1856 – Treatment of ovarian cysts.
- Mémoire sur les allongements hypertrophiques du col de l'uterus, 1860 – Treatise on hypertrophic elongation of the cervix.
- De l'hystérométrie et du cathétérisme utérin, etc. 1865 – Hysterometry and uterine catheterization.
