= Journal of Orthopaedic Science =

The Journal of Orthopaedic Science (ISSN 0949-2658 (print version); ISSN 1436-2023 (electronic version)), based out of Tokyo, Japan, and published by Springer Science+Business Media, is the official journal of the Japanese Orthopaedic Association. The journal focuses primarily on research and topical debates impacting areas of clinical and experiential orthopedics, but often branches out to other areas of research that directly or indirectly impact orthopedics research. The format of the journal includes original articles of research, instructional reviews, lectures, and editorials.

== Japanese Orthopaedic Association ==
Founded in 1926, the Japanese Orthopaedic Association (JOA) is an organization that primarily promotes research, partnerships, and the dissemination of information regarding orthopedics science to the public. JOA currently has over 19,000 members worldwide. The association itself conducts studies, holds an annual meeting full of presentations and lectures, as well as coordinates research among several organizations across the globe.
