= List of West Virginia placenames of Native American origin =

The following list includes settlements, geographic features, and political subdivisions of West Virginia whose names are derived from Native American languages.

== Listings ==
=== Counties ===
- Kanawha County
  - Village of Kanawha
  - Kanawha City
  - Village of Kanawha Falls
  - Village of Kanawha Head
  - Kanawha Falls (Waterfall)
  - Kanawha River
  - Little Kanawha River
  - West Fork Little Kanawha River
  - Right Fork Little Kanawha River
  - Kanawha State Forest
- Mingo County
  - Village of Mingo
  - Village of Upper Mingo
  - Mingo Run (Brooke County)
  - Mingo Run (Randolph County)
- Monongalia County
- Ohio County
  - Ohio River
- Pocahontas County
- Wyoming County
  - Village of Wyoming
  - Wyoming City

=== Settlements ===
- Algoma
- Alpoca
- Apgah
- Aracoma
- Arkansas – named after the state of Arkansas.
- Bolivar – named after Simon Bolivar.
- Great Cacapon
  - Forks of Cacapon
  - Village of Little Cacapon
  - Cacapon Mountain
  - Little Cacapon Mountain
  - Cacapon River
  - Little Cacapon River
- Capon Bridge
  - Village of Capon Lake
  - Village of Capon Springs
  - Village of Capon Springs Station
  - Capon Lake Whipple Truss Bridge
  - Capon Springs Resort
  - Capon Springs Run
  - Capon Chapel
- Captina
- Catawba
- Chattaroy
- Cherokee – named after the Cherokee people.
- Cheyenne Valley – named after the Cheyenne people.
- Cisco
- Cuba – named after the country of Cuba.
- Cubana
- Decota
- Etowah
- Havaco
- Hiawatha – named after the eponymous Iroquois chief.
- Hoohoo
- Iroquois – named after the Iroquois people.
- Iuka
- Kalamazoo – named after the eponymous Michigan city.
- Kentuck
- Klondike
- Lacoma
- Lake Shawnee – named after the Shawnee people.
  - Shawnee Run
- Lico
- Matoaka
- Merrimac
- Miami – named after the Miami people.
- Michigan – named after the state of Michigan.
- Minnehaha Springs – named after the eponymous character in Dakota folklore.
- Missouri Branch – named after the Missouri river.
- Modoc – named after the Modoc people.
- Mohawk – named after the Mohawk people.
- Mohegan – named after the Mohegan people.
- Naugatuck
- Neponset
- Okonoko
- Onego
- Opekiska
  - Opekiska Lock and Dam
- Osage – named after the Osage people.
- Osceola
- Otsego
- Ottawa – named after the Odawa people.
- Ovapa
- Peora – named after the Peoria people.
- Peru – named after the country of Peru.
- Pickaway
- Pocatalico
  - Pocatalico River
- Potomac
  - Potomac River
  - North Branch Potomac River
  - South Branch Potomac River
- Powhatan – named after the Powhatan people.
- Roanoke – named after the eponymous Virginia settlement.
- Seminole (Harrison County) – named after the Seminole people.
  - Seminole (Summers County)
- Seneca Rocks
  - Seneca Creek
  - Seneca Rocks
  - Seneca State Forest
- Shegon
- Shenandoah Junction
  - Shenandoah River
  - Shenandoah Mountain
- Shenango
  - Shenango Creek
- South Buckhannon
- Tappan
- Texas – named after the state of Texas.
- Tioga
- Tomahawk – named after the eponymous Native American weapon.
- Tuckahoe
- Viropa
- Wahoo
- Waneta
- Wappocomo
- Watoga – from the Cherokee word for "starry waters."
  - Watoga State Park
- Weyanoke
- Winona (Taylor County)
  - Winona (Fayette County)
- Wyco
- Wyoma
- Yukon – named after the eponymous Alaska river.

=== Bodies of water ===
- Bingamon Creek
- Buckhannon River
  - Left Fork Buckhannon River
  - Right Fork Buckhannon River
- Canoe Run
- Elakala Falls
- Guyandotte River – named after the Wyandotte people.
- Hogtan Run
- Monongahela River
  - Monongahela National Forest
- Pocosin Fork
- Swago Creek – shortening of "Oswego".
- Tilhance Creek
- Tuscarora Creek
- Opequon Creek
- Youghiogheny River

=== Other ===
- Allegheny Mountains
  - Allegheny Front
  - Allegheny Mountain
  - Back Allegheny Mountain
  - High Allegheny National Park and Preserve
- Appalachian Mountains
  - Ridge-and-Valley Appalachians
  - Appalachian Forest National Heritage Area
- Cabwaylingo State Forest
- Coon Bone Island
- Kumbrabow State Forest
- Muskingum Island
- Pinnickinnick Mountain

== See also ==
- List of place names in the United States of Native American origin
