= Waneta (disambiguation) =

Waneta (ca. 1795–1848) was a Yanktonai Dakota chief.

Waneta and Wahneta may also refer to:

== People ==
- Waneta Hoyt (1946–1998), American serial killer

== Places ==
- Wahneta, Florida, U.S.
- Waneta, Kentucky, U.S.
- Waneta, West Virginia, U.S.
- Waneta Lake, New York, U.S.
- Waneta, British Columbia, Canada
- Waneta Dam, on the Pend d'Oreille River in British Columbia, Canada

== Ships ==
- Wahneta (YT-1), a United States Navy yard tug in commission from 1893 to 1920
- USS Wahneta (YT-134), a United States Navy yard tug in commission from 1939 to 1946
- USS Waneta (YT-384), a United States Navy harbor tug
