= Cubana =

Cubana may refer to:

- Cubana de Aviación, an airline of Cuba
- Cubana, West Virginia, a town in the United States

== See also ==
- Cuban people
- Cubano (disambiguation)
