= Seminole (disambiguation) =

The Seminole are a Native American people.

Seminole can also refer to:

== Places in the United States ==
- Seminole, Alabama, an unincorporated community
- Seminole, Florida, a city
- Seminole, Oklahoma, a city
- Seminole, Texas, a city
- Seminole, Harrison County, West Virginia
- Seminole, Summers County, West Virginia
- Lake Seminole, a reservoir in Alabama, Florida, and Georgia
- Seminole County, Florida
- Seminole County, Georgia
- Seminole County, Oklahoma
- Seminole State Forest, Florida
- Seminole Manor, Florida

== Arts and entertainment ==
- Seminole (band), a country music duo
- Seminole (film), a 1953 movie starring Rock Hudson and Anthony Quinn
- "Seminole", a 1904 song by Egbert Van Alstyne

== Military ==
- USS Seminole, United States Navy ships of the name
- L-23 Seminole, a United States Air Force liaison aircraft

== Transportation ==
- Seminole (train), a train operated by the Illinois Central Railroad and successors
- Piper PA-44 Seminole, a popular twin-engine aircraft

== Other uses ==
- Seminole, dialects of the Muscogee language spoken by some Seminole
- Florida State Seminoles, the sports teams representing Florida State University
- The 1956 Seminole nuclear test, part of Operation Redwing
- Nickname of Edmund Kirby Smith (1824–1893), Confederate general in the American Civil War
