= Seminole, West Virginia =

Seminole, West Virginia may refer to the following places in West Virginia:

- Seminole, Harrison County, West Virginia
- Seminole, Summers County, West Virginia
