= USS Wahneta =

USS Wahneta has been the name of more than United States Navy ship, and may refer to:

- USS Wahneta (YT-1), a yard tug in commission from 1893 to 1920
- USS Wahneta (YT-134), later YTM-134, a yard tug in commission from 1939 to 1946

== See also ==
- USS Waneta
