= Ronald Paul Bucca =

American firefighter killed on 9/11 (1954–2001)

- Born: May 6, 1954; New York City, New York, U.S.
- Died: September 11, 2001 (aged 47); South Tower, World Trade Center, New York City, U.S.
- Cause of death: Collapse of the South Tower during the September 11 attacks
- Military career
- Allegiance: United States
- Branch: United States Army; Defense Intelligence Agency
- Service years: 1972–2001
- Rank: Captain
- Wars: Vietnam War

Ronald Paul Bucca (May 6, 1954 – September 11, 2001) was a New York City Fire Department Marshal who was killed when the South Tower of the World Trade Center collapsed during the September 11 attacks. He was the only fire marshal in the history of the New York City Fire Department to be killed in the line of duty.

== Military career ==
Bucca had served in the United States Army as a Green Beret during the Vietnam War. Later, he would serve the Defense Intelligence Agency (DIA) as an analyst. Becoming a warrant officer in the Army Reserve in 1986, he was subsequently injured on his civilian job as an FDNY firefighter, which cost him his qualifications as a paratrooper and ended his eligibility with the Army Special Forces, causing him to leave the service.

== Firefighting career ==
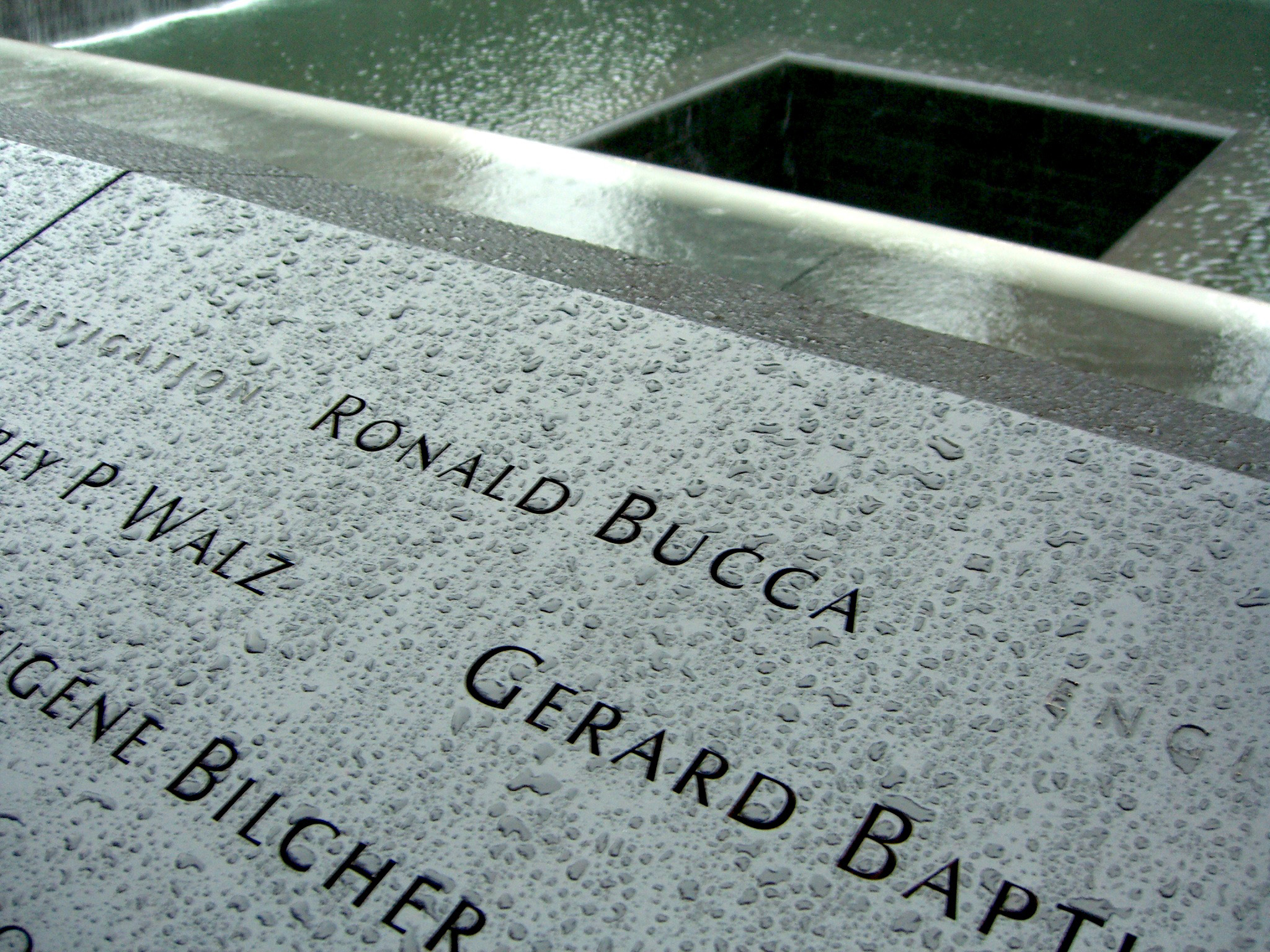
Bucca's name is located on Panel S-13 of the National September 11 Memorial’s South Pool, along with those of other first responders.

Bucca was a 22-year veteran of the department; he was promoted to Fire Marshal in 1992. As such, he was one of the people who investigated the 1993 World Trade Center bombing and the FDNY representative on the Joint Terrorism Task Force. By 2000, the fire department's seat was removed, and Bucca's position there relinquished.

After responding to the September 11 attacks, Bucca ascended to the impact zone at the Sky Lobby on the 78th floor of the South Tower of the World Trade Center, along with Battalion Chief Orio Palmer. The two men, both experienced marathon runners, are believed to have made it to the highest floor of any first responders in either tower before the building collapsed. His body was found on October 23, 2001 and identified using his badge. Bucca was the only fire marshal in the history of the New York City Fire Department to be killed in the line of duty.

== Legacy ==
In 2003, military police named the principal detainee holding camp in Iraq "Camp Bucca".

At the National September 11 Memorial, Bucca is memorialized at the South Pool, on Panel S-14, along with those of other first responders killed in the attacks.

DIA honors Bucca each year through an annual award named after him. The award is given to a military reservist who demonstrates excellence in fulfilling the counterterrorism mission, the area that Bucca worked while at DIA.

Bucca's son, Ron Bucca Jr. joined the Green Berets at age 23, motivated to pursue terrorists like those responsible for the death of his father. He rose to the rank of Master Sergeant, and by 2021, had been through five combat tours.

Bucca grew up in Woodside, Queens and lived in Tuckahoe, New York, where there are memorials of him.
