= Fire marshal =

Person who inspects buildings for fire safety

A fire marshal, in the United States and Canada, is often a member of a state, provincial or territorial government, but may be part of a building department or a separate department altogether. Fire marshals' duties vary but usually include fire code enforcement or investigating fires for origin and cause. Fire marshals may be sworn law enforcement officers and are often experienced firefighters. In larger cities with substantially developed fire departments, the local fire departments are sometimes delegated some of the duties of the fire marshal.

A fire marshal's duties vary by location. Fire marshals may carry a weapon, wear a badge, wear a uniform or plain clothes, can drive marked or unmarked cars, and make arrests pertaining to arson and related offenses, or, in other localities, may have duties entirely separate from law enforcement, including building- and fire-code-related inspections. In many areas, the fire marshal is responsible for enforcing laws concerning flammable materials.

== Canada ==
=== Ontario Fire Marshal ===
In Ontario, the Office of the Fire Marshal (OFM), part of the Ministry of the Solicitor General (Ontario), provides support to municipal fire departments, sets training requirements for firefighters, and advises the government on legislation. The Fire Marshal is responsible for investigating the origins of fires.

The office of the Fire Marshal (OFM) in Ontario is responsible for providing leadership in fire safety and reducing the impact of fire and related hazards on people, property, and the environment. The office administers key legislation, including the Fire Protection and Prevention Act, 1997 and the Fire Code, along with regulations related to firefighter certification, inspections, fire drills, and community risk assessments. It also supports enforcement of these laws, conducts fire investigations, maintains fire data, and provides training and certification for fire service personnel.

The Fire Marshal, along with Deputy Fire Marshals, is appointed by the Lieutenant Governor in Council and serves as the primary advisor to the government of fire protection and public safety issues. The Fire Marshal has authority to monitor and evaluate municipal fire protection services, provide recommendations to improve their effectiveness, and issue guidance or directives related to fire protection practices. The role also includes advising government agencies, supporting coordination between organizations, and promoting consistent fire safety practices across the province.

In addition to advisory and oversight responsibilities, the Fire Marshal is tasked with investigating the origin and cause of fires and explosions, developing and delivering training programs, and maintaining comprehensive fire statistics and records. The office also operates a central fire college and conducts research related to fire protection services. Public education is another key function, with information shared through various methods to promote fire safety awareness. Fire chiefs and other designated officials act as assistants to the Fire Marshal and are required to report fire related information, ensuring coordination and communication across Ontario's fire protection system.

== United States ==
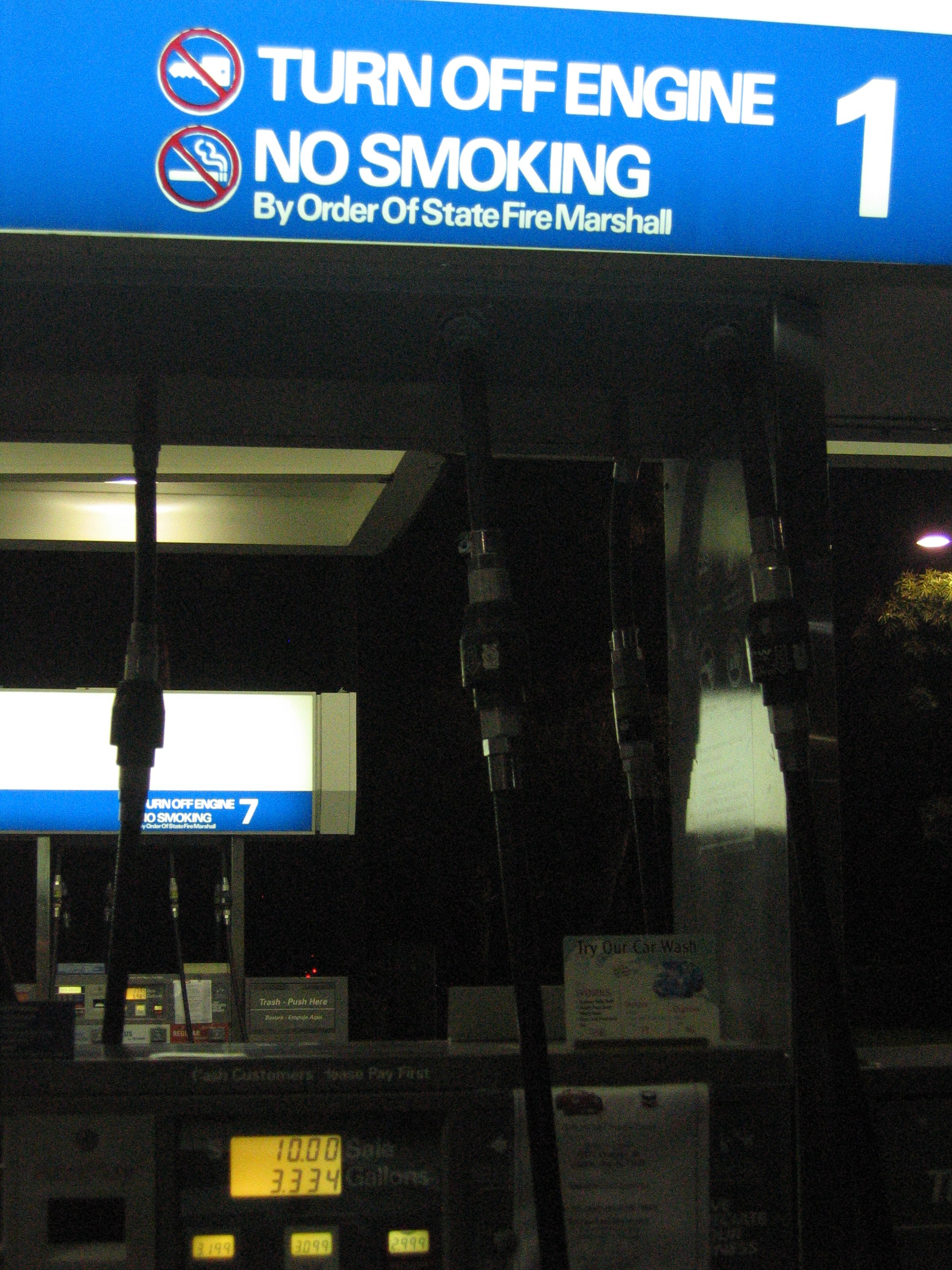
A "no smoking" sign at a gas station by order of the state fire marshal. The fire marshal is often charged with enforcing fire-related laws.

=== Arizona fire marshals ===
In Arizona, fire marshals are employed at the municipal, county, and state levels of government, and possess law enforcement powers where they relate to arson investigation. At the state level, the Office of the State Fire Marshal (SFM) is led by the State Fire Marshal and employs paid deputy fire marshals and unpaid assistant fire inspectors. Deputy Fire Marshals are full time employees of the SFM, while assistant fire inspectors are appointed from local Fire chiefs or those recommended by them. Both deputies and inspectors attend fire inspector training, have fire prevention and fire protection and possess law enforcement powers where they relate to their duties. Duties of fire marshals in Arizona include:

- Assisting in the enforcement of state, county, and local fire laws
- Investigating the causes, origins, and circumstances of fires, including those suspected of arson
- Collecting evidence
- Operating a fire safety inspection program for public buildings and schools
- Inspecting residential complexes
- Maintaining and propagating fire-related laws
- Operating an arson detection reward fund
- Providing and coordinating firefighting and fire protection training

=== California fire marshals ===
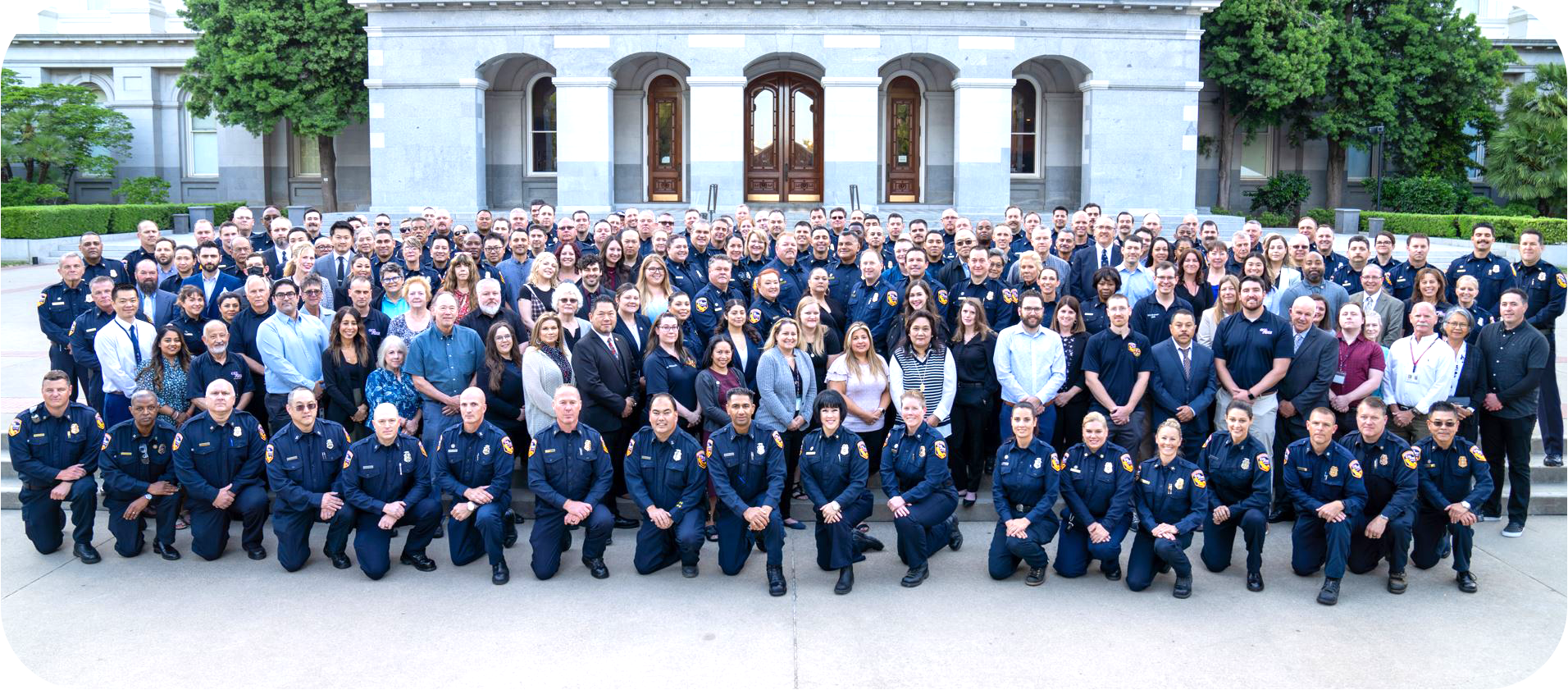
A group photo of CALFire staff

Like most states, Californian fire marshals are typically associated with a city or region's local fire department. Yet, California has two additional authorities that hold the official designations of fire marshal. One is the California Department of Forestry and Fire Protection (CAL FIRE). It is tasked with the building code enforcement of all structures and occupancies within the state. They have the authority to issue building permits, conduct building inspections and investigate code violations. California Fire marshals are designated peace officers. The person heading this office is officially designated as the State Fire Marshal.

The second authority designated as fire marshals is the Office of Statewide Health Planning and Development (OSHPD) who is the state building official for all California hospitals. They are tasked with the structural, electrical and fire/life safety reliability of all hospital construction in the state. This responsibility is paramount in California due to the frequency and intensity of earthquake seismic activity it experiences.

=== Florida Fire Marshal ===
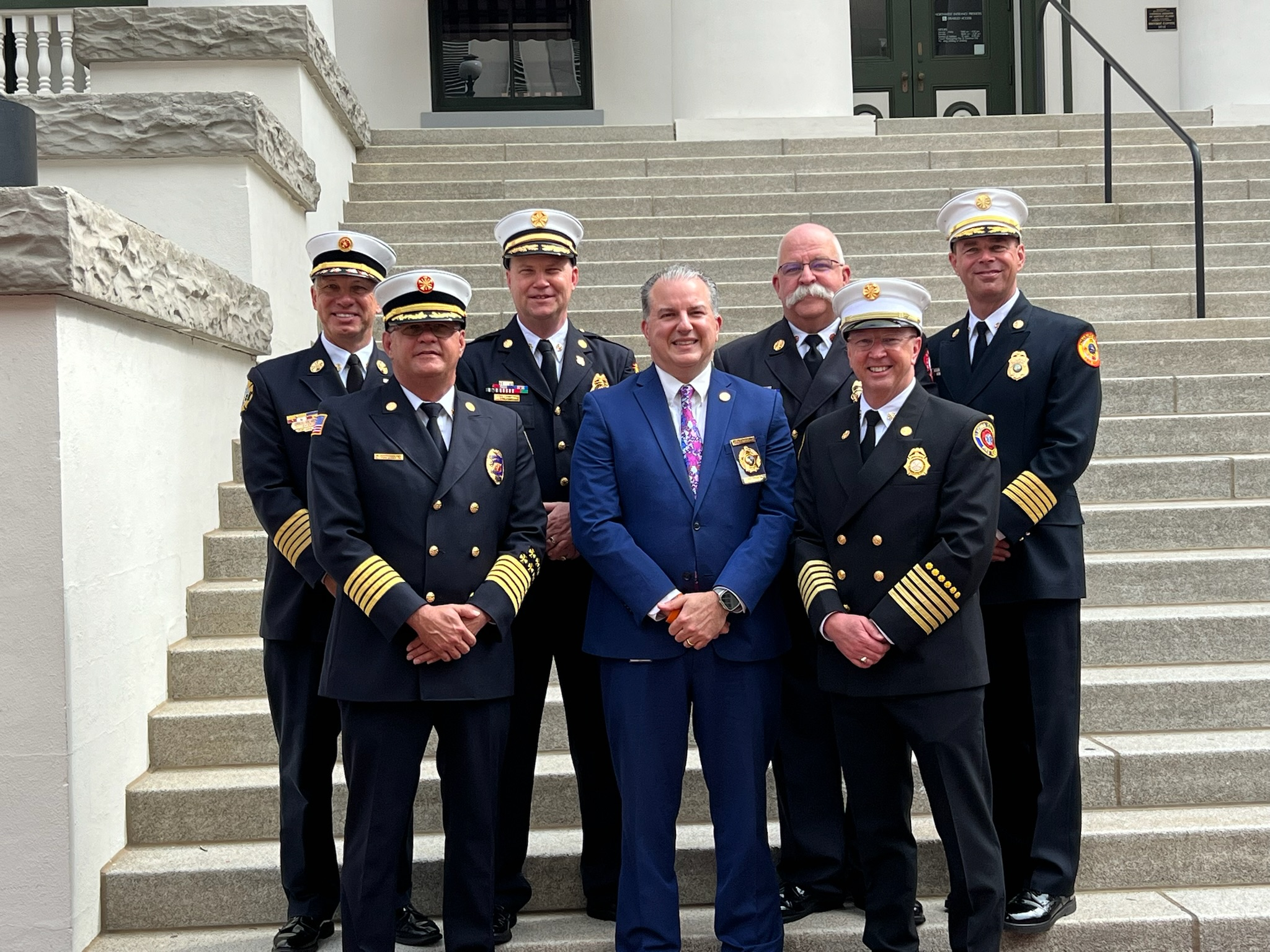
Florida CFO, Jimmy Patronis, with Fire Marshals

The Florida Division of State Fire Marshal (SFM) is located within the Department of Financial Services, where the Chief Financial Officer of Florida (CFO) also serves as Florida's State Fire Marshal.

The SFM office serves local fire departments who request assistance with conducting fire investigations and provides fire training colleges throughout the state. It is headquartered in Tallahassee, with numerous field offices located across the state.

The investigators working for the SFM office are sworn law enforcement officers, with powers to make arrests, conduct searches and seizures, serve summonses, and carry firearms. These law enforcement officers conduct complex investigations and have the ability to make arrests statewide. Investigators conduct thousands of fire-related investigations each year, with approximately 45% being determined to be arson in 2009. Florida SFM investigators make arrest in 18% of the arson fires investigated, which is above the national average of 16%. Fire investigations are complex and potentially dangerous.

The Florida SFM Forensic Laboratory receives and examines over 10,000 evidence submissions every year. These submissions come from fire departments, police departments, Sheriff's offices and SFM investigators. The crime laboratory offers a wide variety of services to include examination of fire debris, explosives analysis, image reproduction and forensic video analysis. The forensic experts in the laboratory conduct consultations with investigators, prosecutors, and other attorneys on analyses and general aspects of forensic science. These consultations are often in preparation for expert witness testimony in criminal court.

The Florida SFM office issues over 3,000 basic firefighter certifications every year. There are thirty-five certified training centers located across the state and the Florida State Fire College. The State Fire College trains over six thousand students per year in a wide variety of certification and professional development programs to include Pump Operator, Fire Officer, Fire Investigator, HAZMAT, etc.

The Florida SFM is responsible for inspecting over 14,000 state-owned buildings every year. SFM code enforcement and inspection activities also reach over 16,000 public and private buildings; to include prisons, universities, public schools, thousands of fuel-fired boiler systems, hundreds of construction mining sites and explosive storage locations each year.

The Florida Fire Incident Reporting Section collects over 1,800,000 fire and emergency reports per year. These local fire department and fire service reports are combined with the other states reports in the National Fire Incident Reporting System (NFIRS) for use by the fire services in analysis and trends. The Florida reports are also used to form the basis for the SFM Annual Report "Florida Fires".

The SFM has authority to implement rules that conform to the standards of fire safety and the need to protect Floridians from fire hazards. Additionally, the SFM shall adopt and administer rules prescribing standards for the safety and health of occupants of educational and ancillary facilities pursuant to ss. 633.022, 1013.12, 1013.37, and 1013.371.

In any county that does not employ or appoint a local fire official, the State Fire Marshal shall assume the duties of the local fire official with respect to fire safety inspections of educational property required under s. 1013.12(2)(b), and the State Fire Marshal may take necessary corrective action as authorized under s. 1013.12(5).

=== New York City Fire Marshals ===
New York City Fire Marshal patch

New York City's Bureau of Fire Investigation, a division of the FDNY, currently employs about 140 Fire Marshals, 30 Supervising Fire Marshals (equal in rank to Captain) as well as several Commanders (equal in rank to Deputy Chief), an Assistant Chief Fire Marshal and a Chief Fire Marshal. The position of fire marshal is a promotional civil service title and all officers have served several years as active firefighters. Unlike many other jurisdictions, the New York City fire marshals are armed police officers with full powers of arrest who generally work in pairs and investigate serious fires with the New York City Police Department. New York City Fire Marshals undergo comprehensive police training to include annual weapons qualification at Camp Smith. Investigations are conducted in cooperation with the New York City Police Department, with whom they have a close relationship. In a typical year they are assigned about 4,000 fires within the five boroughs of the city. New York Fire Marshals often receive special training at the FBI academy in Quantico, Virginia, as well as attending investigative classes conducted by the NYPD and explosives training classes sponsored by the federal government in Socorro, New Mexico. Under New York State Consolidated Laws Article 35.00 section 35.20 "deadly physical force may be used in order to terminate or prevent commission of arson."

The city's first fire marshal, George H. Sheldon, was appointed in 1873, eight years after the reorganization of the fire department into a career department in 1865. Robert O. Lowery became the first African-American fire marshal in 1946. Lowery would ultimately rise to the top of the department, being appointed the city's fire commissioner in 1965.

Fire marshals have conducted a number of significant investigations, including the Triangle Shirtwaist Factory fire of 1911. They investigate insurance fraud involving arson, and more recently, potential terrorism. They also function as expert witnesses in arson cases. At times New York fire marshals work undercover and conduct surveillance operations. They also coordinate with federal, state and local law enforcement because arsonists are frequently involved in other criminal activity as well, and some investigations, like the 1993 bombing of the World Trade Center, require multiple agencies' skills.

The first line of duty NYC fire marshal death was from the September 11, 2001 attacks, when Marshal Ronald Paul Bucca, disregarding the danger, rushed into the World Trade Center to assist in the rescue of civilians trapped within the towers. Bucca, badge 317, a decorated Vietnam War combat veteran, reached the 78th floor of the South Tower along with Battalion Chief Orio Palmer, before the South Tower collapsed. The pair had worked on the 1993 investigation at the same site.

Professional training outside the state at the FBI Academy at Quantico, Virginia, and other locations for New York City marshals was made possible through federal counter-terror grants, subsequent to 9/11, actively supported by Mayor Mike Bloomberg.

New York State Executive Law, article 6c, sec 159, created an arson control board that mandated every jurisdiction prepare an arson control plan and a strong coordinated arson control program to include certification of investigators in compliance with NFPA 921 and NFPA 1033. A state standard of level I and level II fire investigator certification was developed. New York City Fire Marshal's training exceeds the requirements of level II.

=== North Carolina Fire Marshal ===
In North Carolina, fire marshals are appointed by county governments to serve within the jurisdiction in which they are selected. State law allows counties to appoint a fire marshal and any necessary personnel to assist in carrying out fire protection and prevention duties. The county's Board of Commissioners establishes the specific responsibilities assigned to the fire marshal.

The responsibilities of a fire marshal include advising the Board of Commissioners on improvements related to fire protection and prevention activities under the county's authority. The fire marshal also coordinates firefighting operations, training activities, and fire prevention efforts within the county. In addition, the role includes assisting incorporated volunteer fire departments with developing and improving their firefighting and fire prevention capabilities.

Fire marshals are also responsible for conducting fire prevention inspections. these inspections include required evaluations of school buildings and childcare facilities in accordance with applicable state regulations. Electrical inspections may only be performed if the fire marshal meets the qualifications outlined in state law.

In North Carolina the state has their own fire marshal division. This organization is called the North Carolina Office of State Fire Marshal (OSFM). This was established on April 1, 1998, under the former Insurance Commissioner Jim Long by combining multiple fire related programs into a single organization to improve coordination across the state. OSFM is made up of several divisions that handle areas such as code enforcement, training, inspections, investigations, and risk reduction. Its responsibilities include training fire and rescue personnel, enforcing building and fire codes, managing insurance for state owned property, and reviewing construction plans for government projects, supporting fire safety and regulatory oversight throughout North Carolina.

=== Ohio Division of State Fire Marshal ===
The Ohio State Fire Marshal is a division within the Ohio Department of Commerce. First established in April 1900, the Ohio State Fire Marshal’s mission is to safeguard the public, its property, and the environment from fire and fire-related risks through education, investigation and enforcement.

Within Ohio’s Division of State Fire Marshal, there are eight unique and specialized bureaus that form a comprehensive effort to ensure public safety throughout the Buckeye State.

- The Administration Bureau is charged with keeping the division’s operations running smoothly and ensuring it is ready to respond, however it is needed.
- The Bureau of Underground Storage Tank Regulations, also known as BUSTR, regulates the safe operation of underground storage tanks containing petroleum and hazardous substances. BUSTR conducts regular inspections, provides education to underground storage tank owners and operators, and enforces state law in compliance with federal regulations and guidelines.
- The Code Enforcement Bureau is charged with enforcing standards set by the Ohio Fire Code. Inspectors work alongside local officials to conduct fire safety inspections to ensure the state’s school, nursing homes, and other facilities to safeguard lives and property of some of Ohio’s most vulnerable citizens.
- The Fire Prevention Bureau provides Ohio’s fire service and residents with fire and life safety education. The bureau is also responsible for maintaining the Ohio Fire Incident Reporting System. With educators located throughout the state, the Fire Prevention Bureau mentors fire departments in Community Risk Reduction to help make Ohio safer.
- The Ohio State Fire Marshal’s Forensic Laboratory provides specialized investigative and training services to Ohio’s fire departments and law enforcement agencies. A team of skilled scientist and fire specialist conduct scientific examinations of ignitable liquids, fire debris, explosives, latent prints, and digital evidence.
- The Fire and Explosion Investigations Bureau (FEIB) is a law enforcement agency tasked with investigating the origin and cause of fires, explosions, and fireworks incidents in Ohio. FEIB was created as the Arson Bureau in 1901 and was the first official agency that investigated arson in the United States.
- The Ohio Fire Academy offers world-class training to firefighter across the state and beyond. Its mission is to provide training to Ohio’s fire service personnel and other allied professionals to improve the safety and proficiency of Ohio’s fire service.
- The Testing and Registration Bureau is responsible for issuing licenses to many products and manufacturers in the state. This bureau issues more than 50,000 licenses, registrations, certifications, and permits annually.

=== Pennsylvania fire marshals ===
There are two levels of fire marshals in Pennsylvania, the state police fire marshal and the local fire marshal. The State Fire Marshal had been an independent office until powers and duties were transferred to the state police in 1919. In 1927, the state (Commonwealth) created the local Fire Marshal position underneath the state police, via an act of April 27, 1927 (P.L. 450, No. 291).

The Pennsylvania State Police (PSP) Fire Marshals are usually considered the final investigative authority for fires deemed exceptionally costly (over $1,000,000) or where a death has occurred. PSP fire marshals are notified by the local fire marshal when their involvement is necessary. State law authorizes and identifies the local fire marshal as an "Assistant to the State Police Fire Marshal". Local fire marshals are selected for their positions by the local fire chief or municipality. The State Police Commissioner (Colonel) then appoints them to the PSP office.

Local Fire Marshals are authorized to investigate fires, obtain and execute search documents, take evidence, and detain and question in the process of establishing origin and cause. This process may or may not result in affecting an arrest or prosecution. Both levels of Fire Marshals often testify in civil and criminal court proceedings, and respond and collaborate with insurance investigators. Along with state law, many municipalities have assigned local law enforcement officer (LEO) status to their respective fire marshals due to the nature of the service, requirements to detain, question or arrest, enforce fire safety-related laws, and to protect themselves during potential high-risk investigations. (Some of the largest methamphetamine labs in the U.S. have been found in Pennsylvania during local fire marshal's investigations.)

All municipalities and fire districts require fundamental fire training and substantial fire fighting experience, followed by progressive continuing fire investigation education supplied by the Pennsylvania State Police. Municipalities who have granted specific LEO status usually require either PA Act 120 or PA Act 235 training in addition.

=== Virginia Fire Marshals ===
The Virginia State Fire Marshal's Office is part of the Virginia Department of Fire Programs; the current marshal is Charles E. Altizer, P.E. The mission of the office is to provide safety to life and property from fire for the citizens of the Commonwealth. To do this, the Office:

- Utilizes inspectors and engineers to complete fire safety inspections in localities that do not have their own fire code official
- Conducts building plan reviews for fire safety measures
- Conducts construction inspections for fire safety systems in state buildings
- Provides assistance to local building and fire code officials; and
- Responds to complaints and questions from private citizens.

Many of Virginia's larger urban localities have their own local fire official. For example, Fairfax County's Office of the Fire Marshal has over 100 employees who are trained and certified to enforce a variety of fire prevention regulations including portions of the Uniform Statewide Building Code. The Office, which is the Fire Prevention Division of the Fire & Rescue Department's Business Services Bureau, functions under the command of a Deputy Fire Chief, who is responsible for oversight of all aspects of the Office's mission, including supervision of the Fire Prevention Services (FPS) and Hazardous Materials & Investigative Services (HMIS) sections, each commanded by a Battalion Fire Chief. The mission is to prevent the inception or recurrence of fire and hazardous conditions by providing fire prevention and hazardous materials-related educational, enforcement, inspection, investigative, plans review, and technical services to the businesses, industries, residents, and visitors of Fairfax County and the towns of Clifton, Herndon, and Vienna.

=== Washington Fire Marshals ===
The Washington State Fire Marshal's Office is a bureau within the Washington State Patrol. The Office of the State Fire Marshal provides services including incident reporting, data collection, code review, construction plan fire safety, fireworks and supervision of sprinkler installation.

== United Kingdom ==
The American definition of a fire marshal should not be confused with that used in the United Kingdom. Fire marshals (sometimes known as "fire wardens") are civilians trained to assist in fire evacuation procedures at businesses and other organizations, usually employees.

There is no direct equivalent to a US fire marshal in the United Kingdom. The enforcement and investigation role are carried out by two separate professionals known as fire investigators and fire inspectors.

Fire investigators are highly trained and experienced firefighters or fire officers, who investigate cases of arson and other fire incidents where the cause of the fire is unclear or disputed. Fire investigations can also be carried out by police scenes of crime officers. Fire investigators do not fulfill a direct law enforcement role but instead act as expert witnesses in any prosecutions brought forward by the police or fire service.

The enforcement of fire safety legislation is undertaken by fire safety inspectors, or fire safety officers as they are sometimes known.

UK fire officers do not have powers of arrest but can place suspects under caution and prosecute anyone who has failed to comply with fire safety law. They also have the authority to close unsafe premises and investigate any actual perceived fire safety offence. They have substantial powers of entry. Most fire inspectors are experienced firefighters / fire officers, but there are also several civilian fire inspectors.

== Australia ==
Australia uses similar terminology to the United Kingdom, with Fire Warden (or increasingly "Emergency Warden" or simply "Warden") being the preferred term used for civilians designated by a facility as responsible for managing fire and other emergencies in buildings.

The closest equivalent of the US Fire Marshal in New South Wales is the powers granted under the Environmental Planning and Assessment Act 1979 for Fire Brigade officers to inspect the fire safety of a building if requested by the owner or occupier of a building, when requested by the responsible council authority or if the fire brigade has received a written complaint about the fire safety of the building.

== See also ==
- Fire police
- Women in firefighting
