= Lico =

Lico may refer to:

== Sports ==
- Lico (footballer, born 1944), real name José Antonio Morante Gutiérrez
- Lico (footballer, born 1951), real name Antônio Nunes
- Lico (footballer, born 1974), real name Fladimir da Cruz Freitas
- Lico (footballer, born 1984), real name Paulo Cândido Serafim da Cruz
- Lico Kaesemodel (born 1983), Brazilian racing driver, real name Orlando Otto Kaesemodel Neto
- Lico Mederos (1890–death unknown), Cuban baseball player, real name Jésus Mederos
- Dean Liço (born 2000), Albanian footballer

== Other ==
- Lico, West Virginia, a community in Kanawha County, West Virginia
- Frederick "Lico" Reyes (1946–2019), Mexican-American actor and politician
- Lico Jiménez (1851–1917), Cuban pianist and composer, real name José Manuel Jiménez Berroa
- Mount Lico, a mountain in Mozambique
- Linux Counter, a website that counted Linux users
