= Shenango =

Shenango can refer to:

- Camp Shenango a World War II Military Personnel Replacement Depot
- Shenango Township, Lawrence County, Pennsylvania
- Shenango Township, Mercer County, Pennsylvania
- Shenango, West Virginia
- Shenango River
- Shenango Valley Mall
- Shenango, one of several alternative names for Logstown, a Native American village in western Pennsylvania.

== See also ==
- Chenango
