= Weyanoke =

Weyanoke may refer to:

- Weyanoke people, historic American Indians who lived on the Weyanoke Peninsula in Virginia in the 17th century, which English colonists named after them
- Weyanoke, Louisiana, an unincorporated community
- Weyanoke, Virginia, an unincorporated community
- Weyanoke, West Virginia, an unincorporated community
