= Tuckahoe =

Tuckahoe is a Native American word that may refer to:

== Plants and fungi ==
- Peltandra virginica, also called tuckahoe; the rhizome was cooked and used as food by Native Americans
- Orontium aquaticum, also called tuckahoe; the seeds and rhizome were used as food by Native Americans
- Wolfiporia extensa, also called tuckahoe; the sclerotium of a fungus used as food by Native Americans and by the Chinese as a medicinal

== Buildings in the United States ==
- Tuckahoe Plantation, boyhood home of Thomas Jefferson, Virginia
- Tuckahoe (Jensen Beach, Florida) or the Leach Mansion, Jensen Beach, Florida

== Natural formations in the United States ==
- Tuckahoe Bay, in South Carolina
- Tuckahoe Creek, in Maryland
- Tuckahoe River (disambiguation)
- Tuckahoe Group, geologic group, Virginia

== Places in the United States ==
=== Maryland ===
- Tuckahoe State Park, a public park in Maryland

=== Missouri ===
- Tuckahoe, Missouri, an unincorporated community

=== New Jersey ===
- Tuckahoe, New Jersey, an unincorporated community in Upper Township, Cape May County
- Tuckahoe station (New Jersey)

=== New York ===
- Tuckahoe (village), New York, a village in Eastchester, Westchester County
  - Tuckahoe (Metro-North station), a railroad station in the village
  - Tuckahoe Union Free School District, a public school district that serves the village
  - Tuckahoe High School, a school in the village
- Tuckahoe, Suffolk County, New York, a hamlet in Suffolk County

=== Pennsylvania ===
- Camp Tuckahoe, a Boy Scouts of America camp in York County

=== Virginia ===
- Tuckahoe, Virginia, a census-designated place in Henrico County
- Tuckahoe Recreation Center, a private aquatic complex in McLean, Virginia

=== West Virginia ===
- Tuckahoe, West Virginia, an unincorporated community

== See also ==
- Tuckahoes and Cohees
- RuPaul’s Drag Race
