= USS Chenango (1863) =

Gunboat of the United States Navy

History

United States
- Name: Chenango
- Launched: 19 March 1863
- Commissioned: 29 February 1864
- Decommissioned: 1 July 1865
- Stricken: 1868 (est.)
- Fate: Sold 28 October 1868

General characteristics
- Class & type: Sassacus-class gunboat
- Displacement: 974 tons
- Length: 205 ft (62 m)
- Beam: 35 ft (11 m)
- Draught: 6 ft 6 in (1.98 m)
- Propulsion: steam engine; side wheel-propelled
- Speed: 11 knots (20 km/h; 13 mph)
- Complement: 171
- Armament: two 100-pounder guns; two 20-pounder guns; two 24-pounder smoothbore guns; four 9" smoothbore guns

USS Chenango was a side-wheel steamer in the service of the United States Navy during the American Civil War.

Chenango was launched on 19 March 1863 by J. Simonson, Greenpoint, New York; outfitted at New York Navy Yard; and commissioned on 29 February 1864. Chenango, the first Navy ship of the name, was named after the Chenango river, county, and town in New York State.

== Boiler explosion on initial cruise ==
Assigned to the South Atlantic Blockading Squadron, Chenango left New York City for Hampton Roads, Virginia on 15 April 1864. Before she reached the open sea, her port boiler exploded, scalding 33 men, 28 fatally, with another suffering a head concussion from collateral damage. A raging fire was brought under control and extinguished by the courageous work of her crew, and the ship was towed back to New York for repairs. Placed out of commission on 21 April 1864, Chenango was ready for action and re-commissioned on 1 February 1865.

== Blockade duties ==
Sailing from New York on 17 February 1865, Chenango joined her squadron at Charleston, South Carolina, on the 20th, and until May played an important part in the closing phases of the squadron's long and successful efforts to keep the Confederacy cut off from overseas supply, one of the Navy's great contributions to Union victory. She operated in the Charleston area as well as along the Georgia coast, and on 25 February captured the blockade runner Elvira, laden with cotton and tobacco. Twice she performed reconnaissance, and on 9 March she engaged a Southern force at Brown's Ferry on the Black River. One of her men was wounded in this exchange of fire.

== Decommissioning ==
Chenango cleared Charleston on 16 May 1865, towing the armed steamer USS Cambridge to Philadelphia, Pennsylvania, where she arrived on 20 May, was decommissioned on 1 July 1865, and sold 28 October 1868.

== See also ==
- Union Navy
- Confederate States Navy
