= Jordan Run Falls =

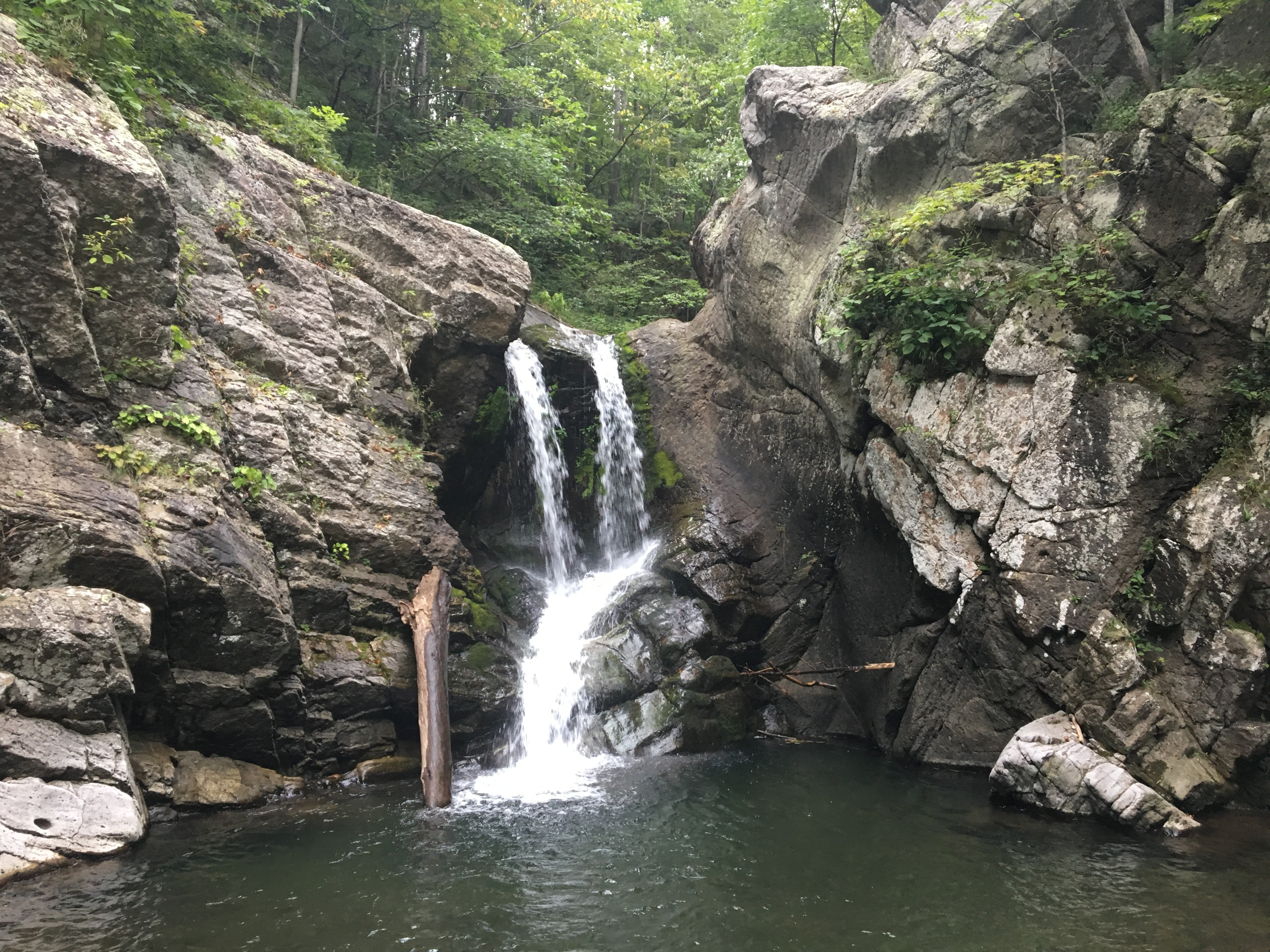
- The Falls at low water, September 2017
- Interactive map of Jordan Run Falls
- Location: North Fork Gap, Grant County, West Virginia, United States
- Coordinates: 38.944°N 79.266°W
- Type: Plunge/horsetail
- Total height: 25 to 30 ft (7.6 to 9.1 m)
- Watercourse: Jordan Run

Jordan Run Falls is a waterfall on Jordan Run, a tributary of the North Fork South Branch Potomac River in Grant County, West Virginia, United States. The drop is about 25 to 30 feet (7.6 to 9.1 m).

== Visiting ==
This waterfall is on private property. It can be accessed with permission from the owner. For owner contact information visit McGuinness Self Service at 4729 Jordan Run Rd, Maysville, WV 26833 (+13047497440). Lady at register seemed like it would be no problem, but that permission was required to be on the property to access.

== Geography ==
Jordan Run Falls is situated in Jordan Run Gorge, a small canyon opening just northwest of the Smoke Hole Caverns visitors parking lot. Jordan Run enters the main river at this point and the falls is located about 0.8 miles (1.3 km) upstream. It may be accessed by a somewhat arduous hike up the trail-less stream bed.

== Kayaking ==
Jordan Run is considered a Class 5 stream and the falls is considered one of the biggest runnable waterfalls in West Virginia. Portaging around the falls can be accomplished high on river right. Wood obstacles are present in the water. Below the falls the run is considered Class 3.

== See also ==
- List of waterfalls in West Virginia
- Jordan Run, West Virginia
