= Cass Cave =

Cave located in Cass, West Virginia

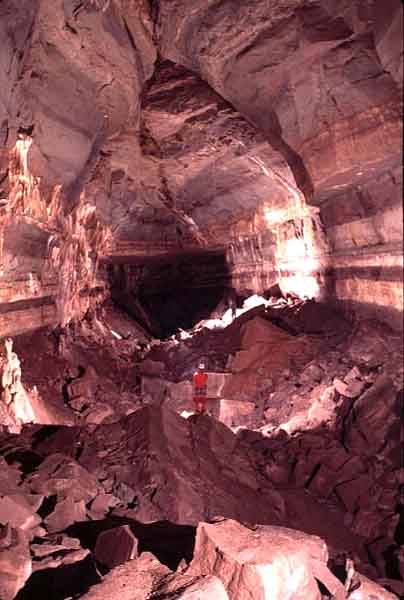
- The Big Room
- Location: Pocahontas County, West Virginia, United States
- Lighting: None
- Visitors: Closed to the public

Cass Cave is a cave located in Cass, West Virginia, on Cheat Mountain. One of the rooms in the cave (the "Big Room") is 800 ft (240 m) long, 180 ft (55 m) high and 75 ft (23 m) wide. Cass Cave has the highest subterranean waterfall in West Virginia and Virginia, Lacy Suicide Falls, with a height of 139 ft (42 m). The waterfall was misnamed, as while a suicide did occur in the cave, it was at a small drop near the entrance. The cave is not open to the general public.

The June 1964 Issue of National Geographic featured a two-page fold-out color photograph by Huntley Ingalls of a caver climbing a wire ladder adjacent to the waterfall. The photo was illuminated by a series of #2 Press photo flashbulbs laid over an aluminum foil reflector spread on the slope below.

== Cave rescues and deaths ==
On March 16, 1968, eight people were trapped and later rescued in the cave. In 1976, an amateur caver was trapped in the cave for more than 15 hours, falling 40 feet to the cave floor after an equipment malfunction. In 1977, a climber was trapped in the waterfall and died of hypothermia due to being drenched by falling water.

== See also ==
- List of waterfalls of West Virginia
