= USS Wahneta (YT-134) =

Tugboat of the United States Navy

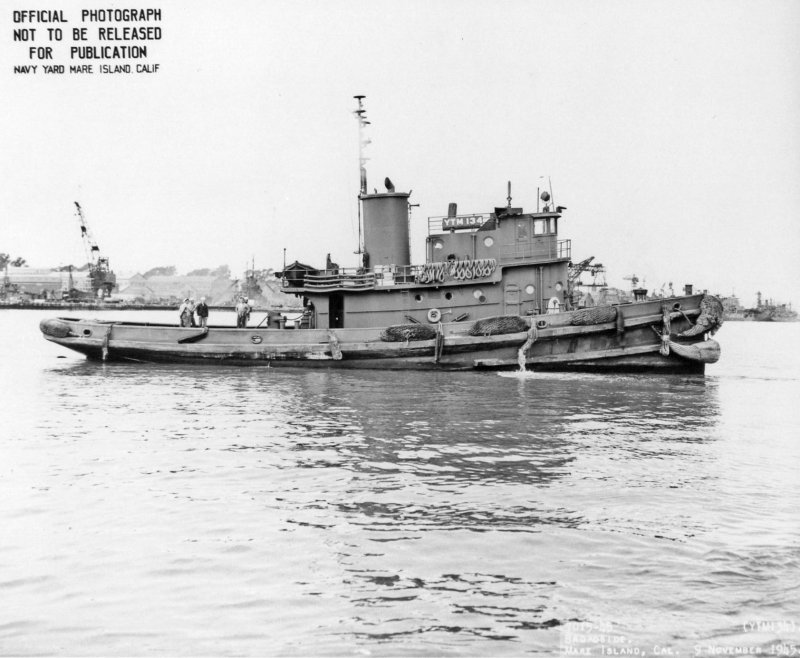
- USS Wahneta (YTM-134) at Mare Island Navy Yard, Vallejo, California, on 9 November 1945

History

United States
- Name: USS Wahneta
- Namesake: Waneta (or "Wahneta") (ca. 1795-1848), a Sioux chief
- Builder: Mare Island Navy Yard, Vallejo, California
- Laid down: 29 September 1938
- Launched: 3 May 1939
- Completed: 23 June 1939
- Reclassified: Medium harbor tug (YTM-134) on 15 May 1944
- Stricken: 30 December 1946
- Fate: Transferred to Maritime Commission for disposal 2 June 1947

General characteristics
- Type: Yard tug
- Displacement: 250 tons
- Length: 100 ft (30 m)
- Beam: 25 ft (7.6 m)
- Draft: 10 ft (3.0 m)

For similarly named United States Navy ships, see USS Waneta.

The second USS Wahneta (YT-134), later YTM-134, was a United States Navy yard tug in commission from 1939 to 1946.

Wahneta was laid down on 29 September 1938 at Mare Island Navy Yard at Vallejo, California. She was launched at midnight on 3 May 1939 — as tide conditions were most favorable then — via an "aerial route:" Large cranes hoisted her up from her building way, swung her out over the water, and then gently lowered her into the channel.

Completed on 23 June 1939, and subsequently commissioned, Wahneta performed towing and fire-fighting duties in the busy 12th Naval District throughout World War II. During this service, she was reclassified as a medium harbor tug and redesignated YTM-134 on 15 May 1944.

After the close of World War II, Wahneta was declared surplus to Navy needs and was struck from the Navy List on 30 December 1946. She was transferred to the Maritime Commission on 2 June 1947 for disposal.
