= List of waterfalls in West Virginia =

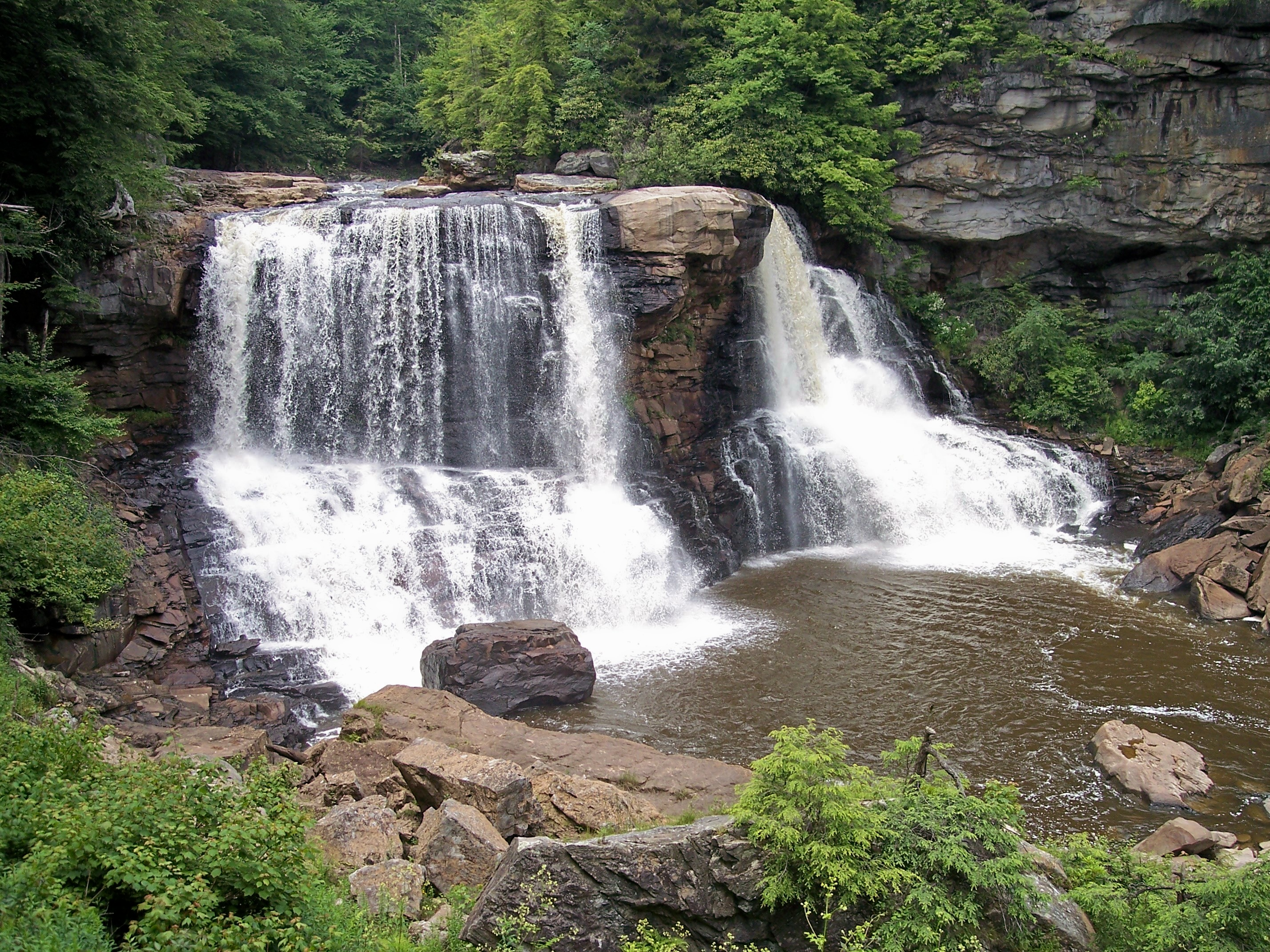
Blackwater Falls in Tucker County

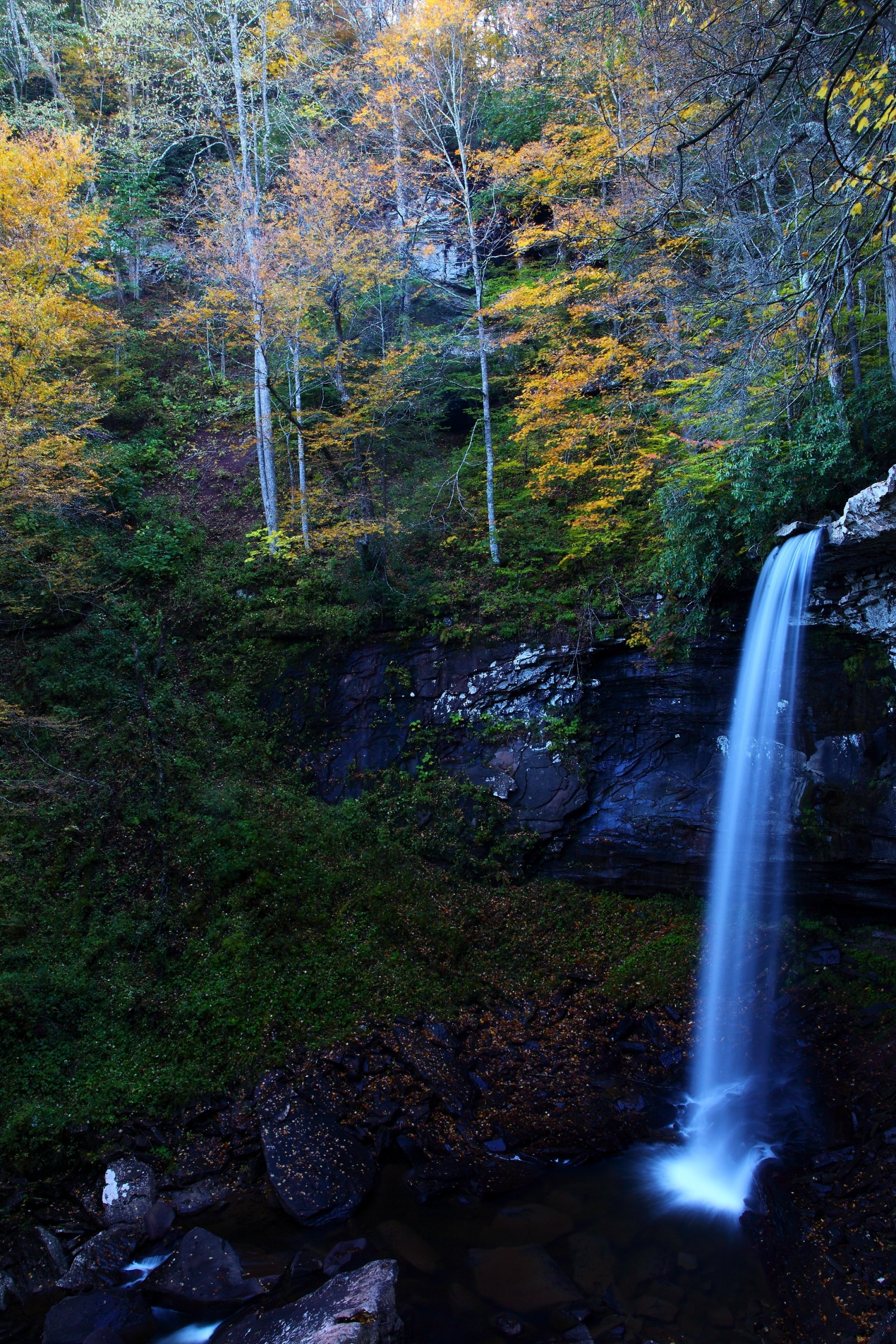
Falls of Hills Creek (Lower) in Pocahontas County

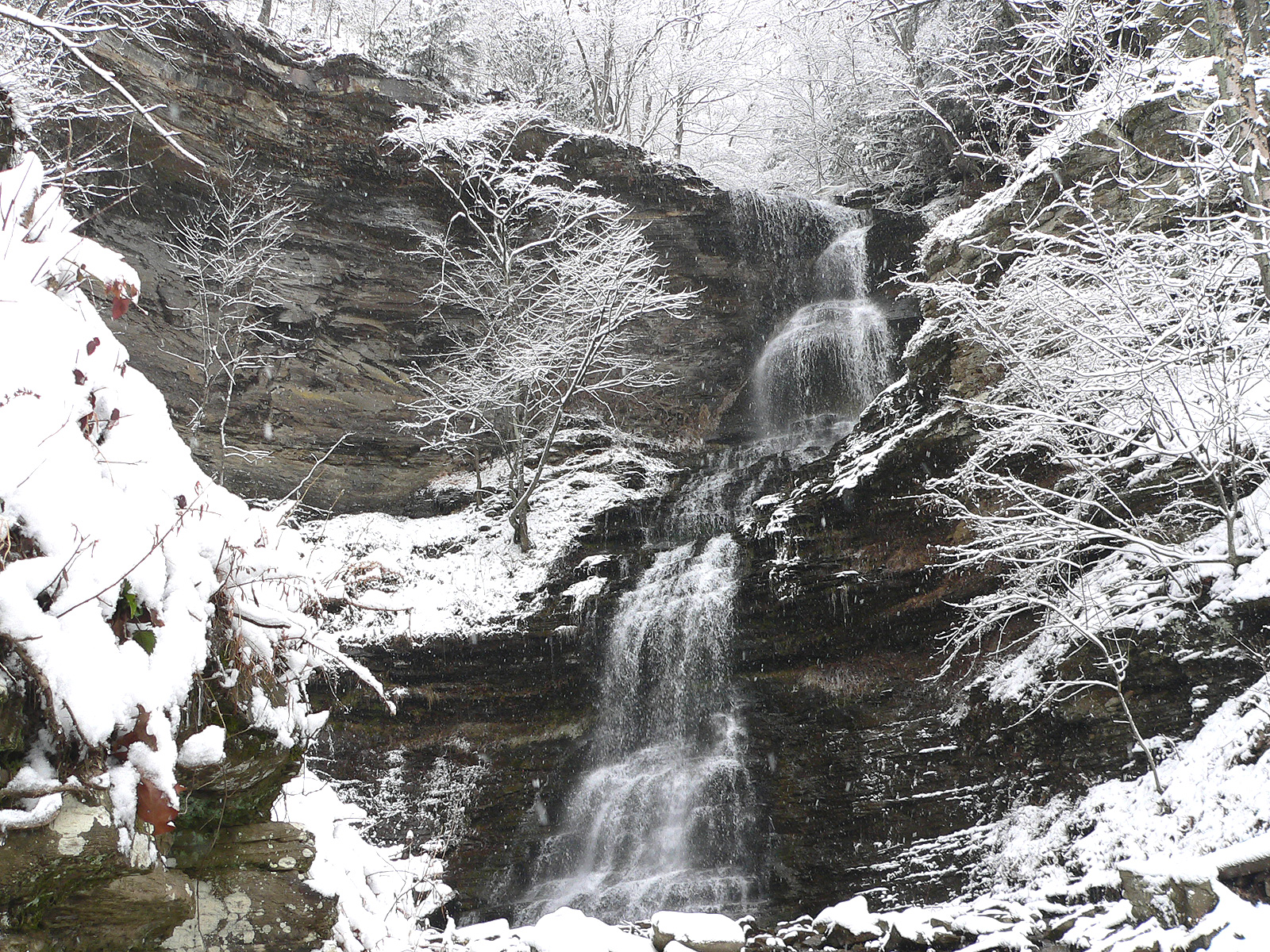
Cathedral Falls in Fayette County.

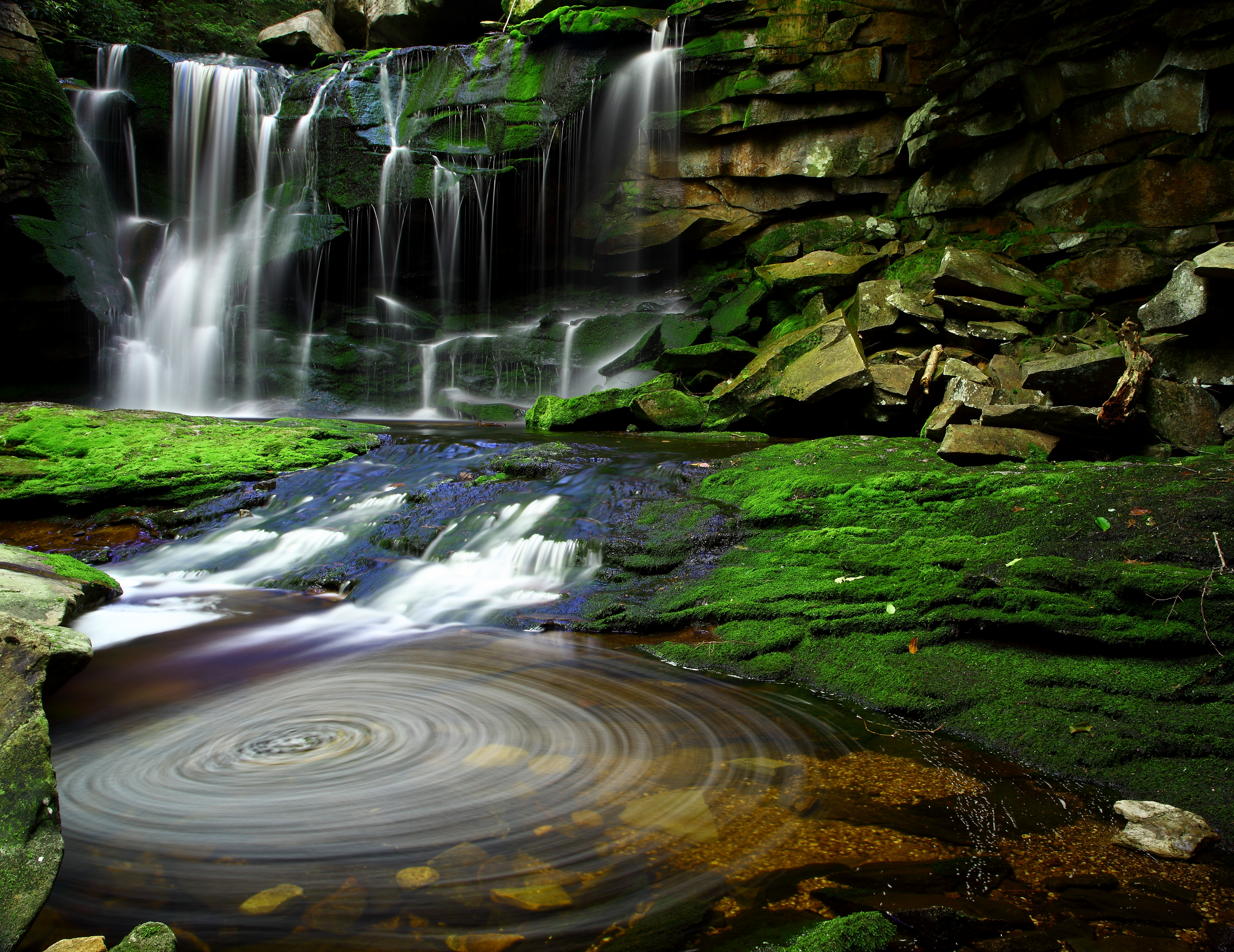
Elakala Falls in Tucker County

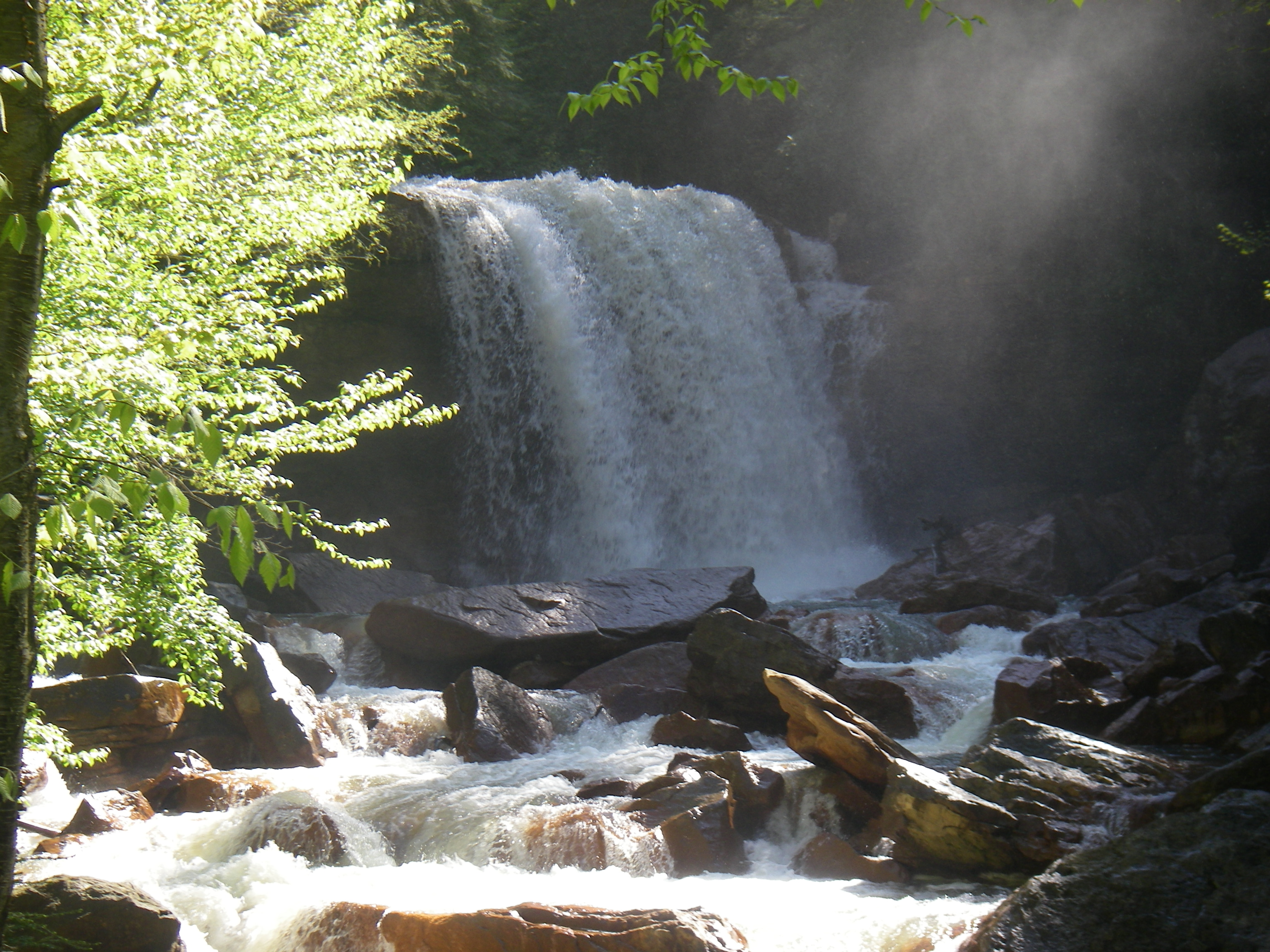
Douglas Falls in Tucker County

There are about 275 waterfalls in the U.S. state of West Virginia.

== Surface waterfalls ==
Name	Height	Coordinates	USGS Map	GNIS ID
Black Fork Falls	20 ft (6.1 m)	?????	Mullins	?????
Blackwater Falls	57 to 63 ft (17 to 19 m)	39.113889°N 79.483333°W	Blackwater Falls	1550380
Brush Creek Falls	25 ft (7.6 m)	?????	?????	?????
Cathedral Falls	60 ft (18 m)	38.15444 N 81.1788 W	Gauley Bridge	?????
Douglas Falls	35 ft (11 m)	?????	?????	?????
Elakala Falls (3rd fall)	40 ft (12 m)	?????	?????	?????
Falling Spring Run Falls	40 ft (12 m)	?????	?????	?????
High Falls of Cheat	15 to 18 ft (4.6 to 5.5 m)	38.772500°N 79.777222°W	Beverly East	1551426
Jordan Run Falls	25 to 30 ft (7.6 to 9.1 m)	38.994131°N 79.266189°W	Hopeville	1551612
Kanawha Falls	15 to 21 ft (4.6 to 6.4 m)	38.151111°N 81.212222°W	Gauley Bridge	1556129
Hills Creek Falls (Lower)	63 to 65 ft (19 to 20 m)	38.173611°N 80.335000°W	Lobelia	1551095
Mill Creek Falls	20 ft (6.1 m)	?????	Ansted	?????
Pendleton Falls	20 ft (6.1 m) [fall] 150 ft (46 m) [cascade]	?????	?????	?????
Pipestem Falls	15 ft (4.6 m)	?????	?????	?????
Sandstone Falls	15 to 25 ft (4.6 to 7.6 m)	?????	Sandstone	?????
Valley Falls	20 ft (6.1 m)	39.386735°N 80.087832°W	?????	?????
Wonder Falls	15 ft (4.6 m)	39.496331°N 79.644476°W	?????	?????

== Underground waterfalls ==
Many of the state's subterranean waterfalls far exceed the surface falls in height.

Name	Height	Coordinates	USGS Map	GNIS ID
Suicide Falls (Cass Cave)	139 ft (42 m)	?????	?????	?????
Monster Falls (Friars Hole Cave)	103 to 105 ft (31 to 32 m)	?????	?????	?????

== See also ==
- List of waterfalls
- List of West Virginia-related topics
