= USS Chenango =

Two ships of the United States Navy have been named USS Chenango, after the Chenango River of New York.

- USS Chenango (1863), was a side-wheel steamer in service during the American Civil War in 1864 and 1865.
- USS Chenango (CVE-28), was a fleet oiler commissioned in 1941, converted to an escort aircraft carrier in 1942, and in service until 1946.
