= Jordan Run, West Virginia =

- Unincorporated community
- Location within West Virginia Location within the United States
- Coordinates: 39°1′50″N 79°15′15″W
- Country: United States
- State: West Virginia
- County: Grant
- Elevation: 1,549 ft (472 m)
- Time zone: UTC-5 (Eastern (EST))
  - Summer (DST): UTC-4 (EDT)
- GNIS feature ID: 1554833

Jordan Run is an unincorporated community in Grant County, West Virginia, United States. Its post office is closed. It was also known as Jordon Run.

The community takes its name from nearby Jordan Run; Jordan Run Falls is about 3 miles (4.8 km) downstream of the community.
