= Chenango =

Chenango, which means "Bull thistle" in the Oneida language, may refer to:

- Chenango County, New York, a county in the United States of America
- Chenango, New York, a town in Broome County
- Chenango River, a river in New York
- Chenango Forks, New York, a community in Broome County
- Chenango Canal, a former canal in New York
- USS Chenango, the name of two naval ships
- Chenango, Texas, an unincorporated community in Brazoria County
- Chenango Avenue, an avenue in Denver, Colorado
- Chenango, a subdivision in Centennial, Colorado
- Chenango Pl., street in West Lafayette, IN

== See also ==
- Shenango
