= Pinnickinnick Mountain =

Mountain in West Virginia, United States

Coordinates: 39°17′05″N 80°19′45″W

Pinnickinnick Mountain is a summit in West Virginia, in the United States. With an elevation of 1,453 feet (443 m), Pinnickinnick Mountain is the 774th highest summit in the state of West Virginia.

Pinnickinnick Mountain was named after a herb native to the area which was used to make tea.
