= Canoe Run =

Stream in West Virginia, U.S.

Coordinates: 38°56′10″N 80°29′46″W

Canoe Run is a stream in the U.S. state of West Virginia. It is a tributary of West Fork River.

Canoe Run received its name from an incident when pioneers found a canoe there left by Indians.

== See also ==
- List of rivers of West Virginia
