= Upper Mingo, West Virginia =

- Unincorporated community
- Location within West Virginia Location within the United States
- Coordinates: 38°29′35″N 80°03′21″W
- Country: United States
- State: West Virginia
- County: Randolph
- Elevation: 2,674 ft (815 m)
- Time zone: UTC-5 (Eastern (EST))
  - Summer (DST): UTC-4 (EDT)
- Area codes: 304 & 681
- GNIS feature ID: 1727223

Upper Mingo is an unincorporated community in southern Randolph County, West Virginia, United States. Upper Mingo is located along the Tygart Valley River on U.S. Route 219 and West Virginia Route 55, 17 miles (27 km) south-southwest of Mill Creek.
