= Viropa, West Virginia =

- Unincorporated community
- Location within West Virginia Location within the United States
- Coordinates: 39°24′41″N 80°16′55″W
- Country: United States
- State: West Virginia
- County: Harrison
- Elevation: 965 ft (294 m)
- Time zone: UTC-5 (Eastern (EST))
  - Summer (DST): UTC-4 (EDT)
- GNIS ID: 1555897

Viropa is an unincorporated community and coal town in Harrison County, West Virginia, United States. Their post office closed in 1930.

== Etymology ==
The community's name is a portmanteau of Virginia, Ohio and Pennsylvania.
