= Aracoma, West Virginia =

Unincorporated community in West Virginia, United States

- Unincorporated community
- Location within West Virginia Location within the United States
- Coordinates: 37°51′32″N 81°59′31″W
- Country: United States
- State: West Virginia
- County: Logan
- Elevation: 686 ft (209 m)
- Time zone: UTC-5 (Eastern (EST))
  - Summer (DST): UTC-4 (EDT)
- Area codes: 304 & 681
- GNIS feature ID: 1553736

Aracoma is an unincorporated community in Logan County, West Virginia, United States. Aracoma lies along West Virginia Route 10 on the Guyandotte River north of Logan. Aracoma was named for Aracoma, the daughter of the Shawnee Chief Cornstalk.
