= Neponset, West Virginia =

- Unincorporated community
- Location within West Virginia Location within the United States
- Coordinates: 37°28′06″N 80°50′46″W
- Country: United States
- State: West Virginia
- County: Summers
- Elevation: 2,034 ft (620 m)
- Time zone: UTC-5 (Eastern (EST))
  - Summer (DST): UTC-4 (EDT)
- Area codes: 304 & 681
- GNIS feature ID: 1552288

Neponset is an unincorporated community in Summers County, West Virginia, United States. Neponset is located near the east bank of the New River, south of Hinton and north of Peterstown.

The community most likely was named after Neponset, Massachusetts.
