= Winona, Taylor County, West Virginia =

Winona
- Unincorporated community
- Location within the state of West Virginia Winona (the United States)
- Coordinates: 39°23′4″N 80°3′39″W
- Country: United States
- State: West Virginia
- County: Taylor
- Elevation: 1,001 ft (305 m)
- Time zone: UTC-5 (Eastern (EST))
  - Summer (DST): UTC-4 (EDT)
- GNIS ID: 1689874

Winona is an unincorporated community in Taylor County, West Virginia, United States.
