= Waneta, Kentucky =

Unincorporated community in Kentucky, United States

- Unincorporated community
- Location within Kentucky Location within the United States
- Coordinates: 37°28′28″N 84°2′28″W
- Country: United States
- State: Kentucky
- County: Jackson
- Elevation: 1,070 ft (330 m)
- Time zone: UTC-5 (Eastern (EST))
  - Summer (DST): UTC-4 (CDT)
- ZIP codes: 40488
- GNIS feature ID: 516222

Waneta is an unincorporated community located in Jackson County, Kentucky, United States.
