= Shenango Creek =

Stream in West Virginia, U.S.

Coordinates: 39°33′53″N 80°41′52″W

Shenango Creek is a stream in the U.S. state of West Virginia.

Shenango Creek most likely is a name derived from the Seneca language.

== See also ==
- List of rivers of West Virginia
