= Pocosin Fork =

Stream in West Virginia, U.S.

Coordinates: 37°27′05″N 81°10′43″W

Location
- Country: United States
- State: West Virginia

Pocosin Fork is a stream in the U.S. state of West Virginia.

The creek most likely derives its name from the word pocosin (or poquosin) a type of marsh.

== See also ==
- List of rivers of West Virginia
