= Wahneta (YT-1) =

Tugboat of the United States Navy

History

United States
- Name: Wahneta
- Namesake: Waneta (or "Wahneta") (ca. 1795–1848), a Sioux chief
- Builder: City Point Iron Works, Boston, Massachusetts
- Laid down: April 1891
- Launched: 3 March 1892
- In service: 1892
- Out of service: 4 August 1920
- Fate: Sold 6 December 1922

General characteristics
- Type: Yard tug
- Displacement: 192 tons
- Length: 92 ft 6 in (28.19 m)
- Beam: 20 ft 11.5 in (6.388 m)
- Draft: 8 ft 0 in (2.44 m)
- Speed: 11.5 knots

The first Wahneta (YT-1) was a United States Navy yard tug in serving from 1892 to 1920.

Wahneta (Yard Tug No. 1) was laid down in April 1891 at Boston, Massachusetts, by the City Point Iron Works. She was launched on 3 March 1892 and subsequently was placed in service and assigned to the 5th Naval District. Stationed at the Norfolk Navy Yard in Norfolk, Virginia, she engaged in unglamorous but vital tug, tow, and general harbor duties.

In February 1893, Wahneta served as a seagoing observation platform off Port Royal, South Carolina. From her deck, observers watched test firings of the 15-inch (381-millimeter) pneumatic rifles of the unique "dynamite gun cruiser" USS Vesuvius.

Returning to her routine work soon thereafter, Wahneta remained based at Norfolk from 1893 to 1922, through both the Spanish–American War and World War I. On 17 July 1920, as the U.S. Navy established its modern hull classification system, Wahneta was designated YT-1.

Subsequently placed out of service at Norfolk on 4 August 1920, the venerable Wahneta was sold on 6 December 1922 to the Norfolk Lighterage Company.

== See also ==
YT-1 is also cryptonym for 2-phenylquinolone.
