= Watoga, West Virginia =

Watoga is an unincorporated community in Pocahontas County, West Virginia, United States. Watoga is located on the east bank of the Greenbrier River, 3.5 miles (5.6 km) east-northeast of Hillsboro.

== Early history ==
Watoga, West Virginia
- Unincorporated community
- Location within West Virginia Location within the United States
- Coordinates: 38°08′44″N 80°09′04″W
- Country: United States
- State: West Virginia
- County: Pocahontas
- Elevation: 2,113 ft (644 m)
- Time zone: UTC-5 (Eastern (EST))
  - Summer (DST): UTC-4 (EDT)
- Area codes: 304 & 681
- GNIS feature ID: 1555926

The town of Watoga was originally built by the Watoga Lumber Company in the early 1800s. The origin of the name of Watoga is unknown, however it is believed that the name is derived from a Native American language (possibly Cherokee). This company town was built as a way for the lumber company to keep their employees close and dependent on them to not only provide employment but also food, medicine, and clothing. The company town was never very large, however they had their own school, general store, and post office. Unfortunately, the timber industry in the area was unsustainable and by the early twentieth century the entirety of Pocahontas County had been timbered, and the lumber companies closed, leaving the town of Watoga abandoned.

== The Watoga Land Association ==
In 1921, nine African Americans from Bluefield, West Virginia became the first share holders of the Watoga Land Association. Their names were Mr. Edwin Mann, Mr. James S. Kahle, Mr. L. A. Hooper, Mr. C.A. Bradshaw, Mr. W.C. Pollock, Mrs. B.A. Alexander, Mr. E.M. McCulloch, Mr. G.W. McCulloch and Mr. J.E. Woodson and they along with the support of T. Edward Hill and The Bureau for Negro Welfare and Statistics set out to create a community where African Americans could own their own land and govern themselves. The idea for this enterprise came from Dr. Tyler Edward Hill, the then director of the Bureau for Negro Welfare and Statistics, a state agency that was set up to assist African Americans economically, such as providing help in purchasing farms. While Hill was politically conservative, he was a very active member of the African American political community, and he believed that employment was the key to African Americans becoming prosperous and gaining equality. He traveled the country petitioning other African Americans to join the Watoga Community saying that West Virginia made "more rapid strides in the development of business enterprises in the past two years than they have made in the previous decade."

The Watoga Land Association acquired 10,000 acres of land in Pocahontas county, including the old company town of Watoga. Members of the association repurposed the buildings that had been abandoned and took up residence there. Little is known about the community, or what their lives were like. After its creation T. Edward Hill had little to do with Watoga, and the community members were left to fend for themselves. They printed a newspaper with the help of a local reverend, A.B. Farmer, called The Associated Voice however only a few issues were printed before the paper was shut down. The community members also wanted to start their own school for African Americans called the Watoga People's School, however the school never came to be. While the community had interests in academic and recreational pursuits, the main goal of the community was to farm the land that they purchased and become self sustainable, however the land that they had was not good farm land and it was a struggle for them to survive. By the 1930s the Watoga Land Association ran out of money, and the majority of its residents had moved away in order to find work, although members of the community still maintained ownership of the land. This did not last long, and in 1967 the majority of the land owned by the Watoga Land Association was sold to the Monongahela National Forest. State of West Virginia, West Virginia Division of Culture and History, Historic Preservation. There are still a few plots of land that are privately owned, but the vast majority of what was once the Watoga Land Association is now owned by Monongahela National Forest, including the remains of the company town.

== Legacies ==
While there is not much information about the Watoga Land Association, or the town of Watoga, the creation of a separate African American community is indicative of state wide and national trends that were happening at the time. In the early twentieth century West Virginia saw a huge rise in its African American population. This influx was due to the fact that farms were failing all across the south, and African Americans were no longer able to make a living farming or sharecropping. At this same time coal mining was an extremely lucrative employment opportunity, and the southern counties saw mass amounts of southern, unemployed black migrants coming into the state looking for work. While there was some class solidarity within the coal mines, coal companies maintained only a certain number of racial minorities as employees in order to be sure that the miners would not band together and unionize. This strategy worked, at least partially, as the African American coal miners chose to work, instead of going on strike during the Battle of Blair Mountain. This supposed loyalty to the mines made black miners valuable workers, and coal companies started to look for ways to entice black miners to stay in West Virginia even when the mines were not operating. The Bureau for Negro Welfare and Statistics, sharing this same goal, suggested resettling Southern black workers to available farmland in the state, many miners already going to work at nearby farms when they couldn't get work in the mines. Black miners and their families also faced trying to find adequate housing in company towns. The housing that was supplied for black miners was often inferior to that of their white counterparts, and there is documented evidence that management put any maintenance or repair request from black workers at the bottom of their lists, leaving their houses in poor condition. This discrimination compounded the problems already faced by residents of company towns, such as lack of access to indoor plumbing, inadequate sewer systems, and little to no electricity. Although company housing slowly began to improve, it was rare for a black miners to be able to afford to move out of company housing. When they did, African Americans tended to buy land outside of established urban areas and create "unincorporated segregated developments on the edges of towns or cities."

Nationally, there is also a movement for African Americans to create their own spaces and communities, the most famous being the back-to-Africa movement led by Marcus Garvey, however there were many who wanted to create spaces for African Americans to exist separately. Towns such as Watoga can be found all across the United States, many are no longer active communities.

== In popular culture ==
Watoga is a location in the video game Fallout 76.
