= Elakala Falls =

Coordinates: 39.109°N 79.499°W

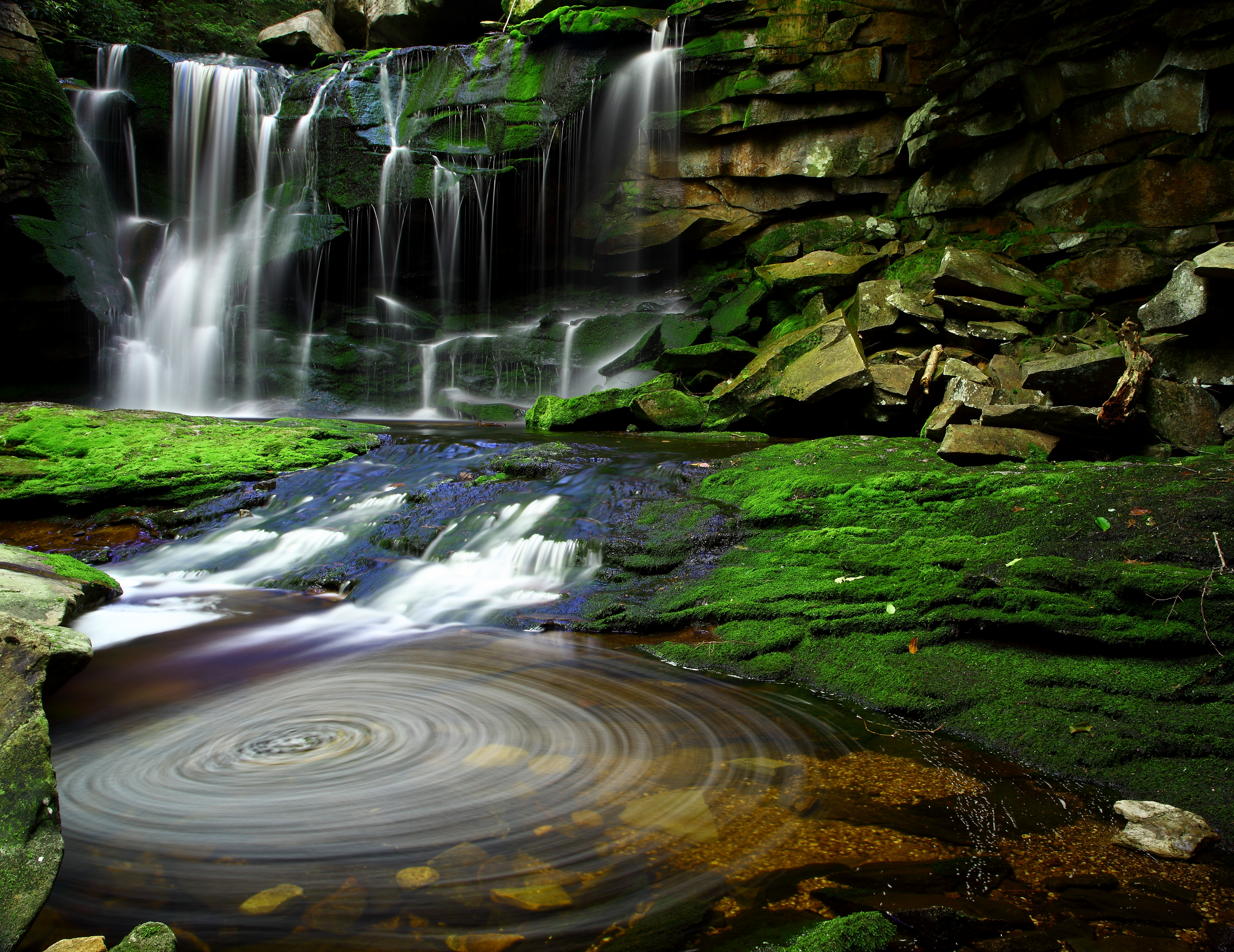
- Elakala Waterfall #1, the most popular and well-known of the series of falls.
- Interactive map of Elakala Falls
- Location: Blackwater Falls State Park, Tucker County, West Virginia, United States
- Type: Segmented block
- Total height: 1. 1 - 35 feet (11 m), #2 - 15 feet (4.6 m), #3 - 40 feet (12 m), #4 - 20 feet (6.1 m)
- Watercourse: Shays Run

The Elakala Falls are a series of four waterfalls of Shays Run as it descends into the Blackwater Canyon in West Virginia. They are within Blackwater Falls State Park and are quite popular among photographers, with the ease of access for the first waterfall, and the relatively low traffic of the other waterfalls in the series.

== Waterfalls Series ==
The first of the series of waterfalls is 35 feet (11 m) in height and is easily accessible from park trails. It is the second most popular waterfall in the park. From the official Elakala trail there is a bridge over the top of the first waterfall offering easy access and views. The remaining three waterfalls of the series are progressively more difficult to access, and have no official marked trails to them. The gorge is nearly 200 feet deep at this section accounting for the difficulty of the descent to the lower waterfalls of the series.

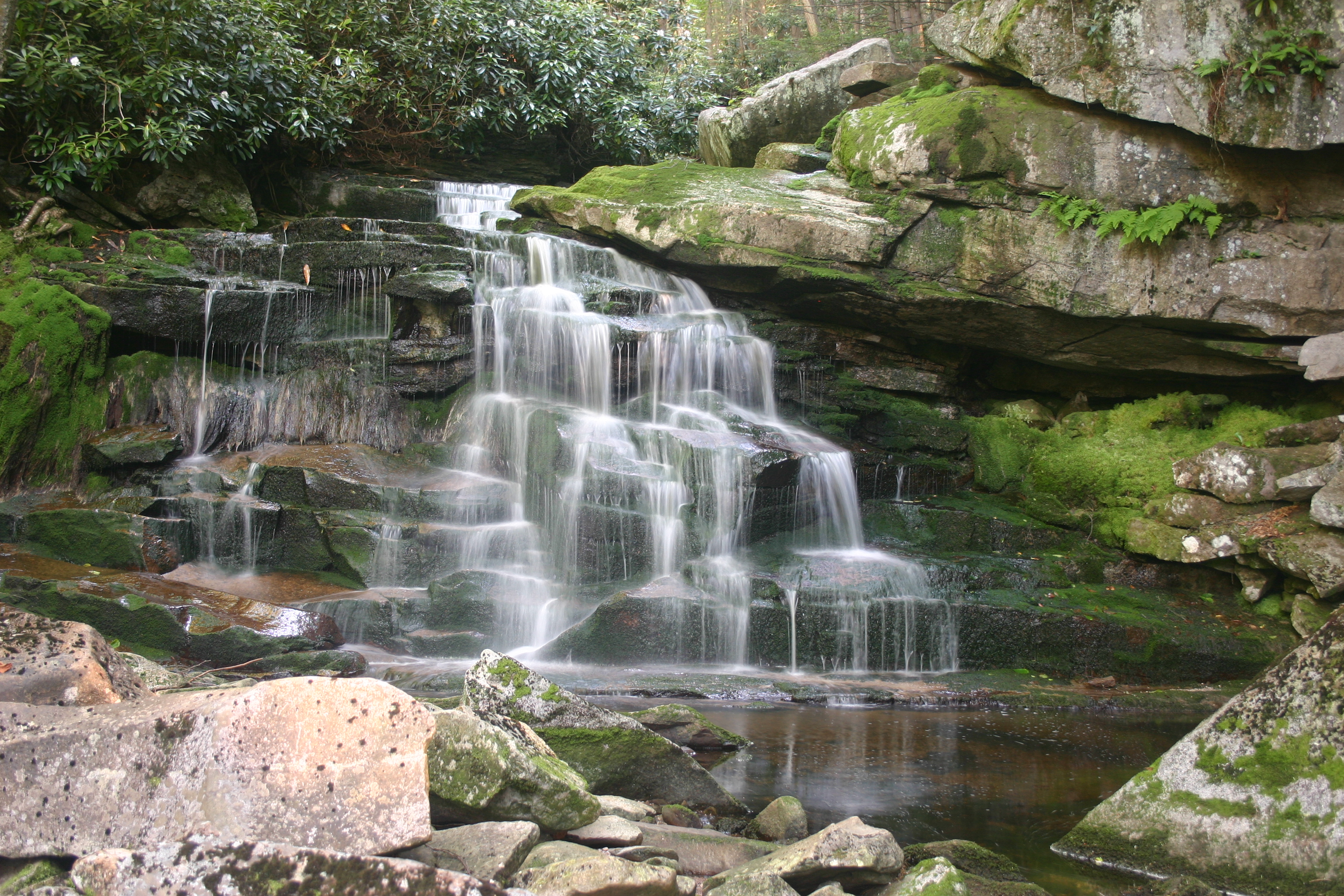
The second falls

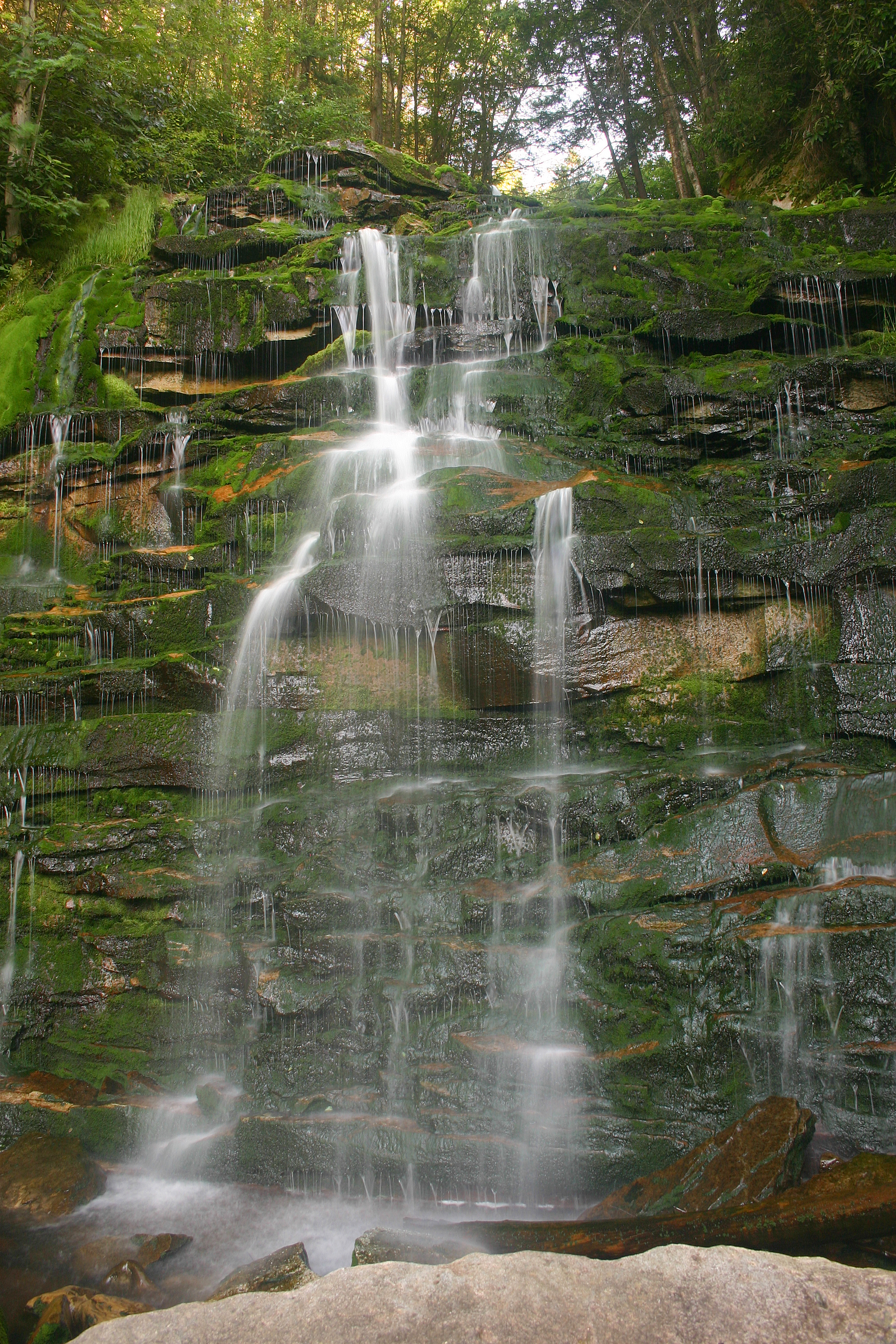
The third falls

The second waterfall is only 15 feet (4.6 m) tall and is the smallest in the series, yet remains popular by the well-worn path from the first falls. The third waterfall of the series is the highest at 40 feet (12 m) tall but is particularly difficult to reach. It has a path worn to it but is very steep and rocky terrain. Traveling beyond the second waterfall should be considered for experienced hikers only due to the danger of descending the canyon without trails. The fourth and final waterfall of the series is considered quite dangerous to access, with no trails, and should not be attempted by inexperienced hikers.

== Etymology and Legend ==
The name of the waterfalls comes from a Native American legend, although several significantly different versions exist. According to one account it involves a princess named Elakala who threw herself over the edge of the first waterfall when her lover scorned her. Another account of the legend involves a Massawomee warrior named Elakala who was girl-shy and fell to his death from the falls while being pursued by two women of his tribe. Similar legends exist for many waterfalls in the eastern United States, and there is, of course, no way to confirm these stories.

== See also ==
- List of waterfalls
- List of waterfalls in West Virginia
