= Tuckahoe River =

Tuckahoe River may refer to:

- Tuckahoe River (New Jersey), river in southern New Jersey
- Tuckahoe Creek, in Maryland
