= Shawnee Run =

Stream in West Virginia, U.S.

Coordinates: 39°22′33″N 81°07′06″W

Shawnee Run is a stream in the U.S. state of West Virginia.

Shawnee Run was named after the Shawnee Indians.

== See also ==
- List of rivers of West Virginia
