= Mingo Run =

Stream in Randolph County, West Virginia, U.S.

Coordinates: 38°29′34″N 80°03′19″W

Mingo Run is a stream in Randolph County, West Virginia, in the United States.

Mingo Run was so named on account of it being a favorite camping ground of the Mingo people.

== See also ==
- List of rivers of West Virginia
