= Cubano =

Cubano could mean:

- having to do with Cuba
- more specifically, a type of Cuban espresso
- a popular name for the Cuban sandwich
- El Cubano, Cuba, a town in the Ward of Vega Alta, Villa Clara Province, Cuba
