= Lico, West Virginia =

- Unincorporated community
- Location within West Virginia and the United States Lico (the United States)
- Coordinates: 38°14′29″N 81°44′20″W
- Country: United States
- State: West Virginia
- County: Kanawha
- Elevation: 669 ft (204 m)
- Time zone: UTC-5 (Eastern (EST))
  - Summer (DST): UTC-4 (EDT)
- GNIS ID: 1541952

Lico is an unincorporated community and coal town in Kanawha County, West Virginia, United States. It was also known as Meisters and Sequio. Its post office is closed.
