= Weyanoke, West Virginia =

- Unincorporated community
- Location within the state of West Virginia Weyanoke, West Virginia (the United States)
- Coordinates: 37°24′55″N 81°15′39″W
- Country: United States
- State: West Virginia
- County: Mercer
- Elevation: 2,418 ft (737 m)
- Time zone: UTC-5 (Eastern (EST))
  - Summer (DST): UTC-4 (EDT)
- Area codes: 304 & 681
- GNIS feature ID: 1555962

Weyanoke is an unincorporated community in Mercer County, West Virginia, United States. Weyanoke is located on County Route 11, 1 mile (1.6 km) west of Matoaka.

The community was named after the Weyanoke Indians, perhaps via the local Weyanoke Coal Company.
