= Shenango, West Virginia =

Shenango
- Unincorporated community
- Location within the state of West Virginia Shenango (the United States)
- Coordinates: 39°35′7″N 80°41′13″W
- Country: United States
- State: West Virginia
- County: Wetzel
- Elevation: 843 ft (257 m)
- Time zone: UTC-5 (Eastern (EST))
  - Summer (DST): UTC-4 (EDT)
- GNIS ID: 1717823

Shenango is an unincorporated community in Wetzel County, West Virginia.
