= Waneta, West Virginia =

Waneta
- Unincorporated community
- Location within the state of West Virginia Waneta (the United States)
- Coordinates: 38°32′55″N 80°14′35″W
- Country: United States
- State: West Virginia
- County: Webster
- Elevation: 3,300 ft (1,000 m)
- Time zone: UTC-5 (Eastern (EST))
  - Summer (DST): UTC-4 (EDT)
- GNIS ID: 1555915

Waneta is an unincorporated community in Webster County, West Virginia, United States.
