= Tuckahoe, West Virginia =

- Unincorporated community
- Location within West Virginia Location within the United States
- Coordinates: 37°45′08″N 80°16′24″W
- Country: United States
- State: West Virginia
- County: Greenbrier
- Elevation: 2,034 ft (620 m)
- Time zone: UTC-5 (Eastern (EST))
  - Summer (DST): UTC-4 (EDT)
- Area codes: 304 & 681
- GNIS feature ID: 1553278

Tuckahoe is an unincorporated community in Greenbrier County, West Virginia, United States. Tuckahoe is 3.5 miles (5.6 km) southeast of White Sulphur Springs.

The community most likely was named after nearby Tuckahoe Run creek.
