= Wanata =

19th-century Yanktonai Dakota chief

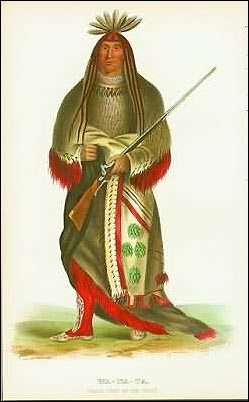
Wanata, painted by Charles Bird King

Wa-na-ta (Dakota: Waánataŋ which translates as One who charges, or Charger) or Waneta was a chief of the Yanktonai, a tribe of the Dakota. Chief Wa-na-ta, also known as Wanata and Wanataan I, was born around 1795. The Yanktonai were located near the St. Peter River, which is today known as the Minnesota River, in present-day Minnesota. The Yanktonai were said to have a population between five and six thousand individuals with 1,300 warriors. Wanata was a very influential chief, as evidenced by his ability to lead his tribes' 1,300 warriors into battle.

Waneta was born about 1795 in what is now Brown County, South Dakota. At age 18, Wanata was accustomed to the ways of war and fought under his father Wakinyanduta (Red Thunder) (Sisseton leader who eventually split off from that band to form the Cuthead band of the Yanktonai) siding with the British against the Americans in the War of 1812.

He fought at the siege of Fort Meigs in 1813. Wanata was recruited by British Colonel Robert Dickson, eventually his brother-in-law, whom convinced him to join him in battle at Fort Sandusky. During this battle, Wanata charged Fort Sandusky and was wounded, but earned himself the nickname "Charger". After the war, the British rewarded Waneta for his loyalty by presenting him with a captain's commission. He subsequently visited England and remained sympathetic to the British until 1820, when an abortive expedition against Fort Snelling resulted in a change of heart. Thereafter, he gave wholehearted support to American interests and even helped influence trade on the Missouri River. A prominent chief of the Dakota people, Waneta signed a trade treaty with the Americans on 25 July 1825. On 17 August 1825 he signed the first Treaty of Prairie du Chien which fixed the boundaries of Sioux territory.

He was murdered by his own tribesmen, who were upset with his leadership, in 1848. He died at the mouth of the Warreconne River, the present Beaver Creek in what is now Emmons County, North Dakota.

== Namesake ==
Two United States Navy ships have been named USS Wahneta and one has been named USS Waneta in honor of Waneta.

Waneta Hall, a residence hall at South Dakota State University, was named in honor of Chief Waneta in 1959. This renewed a pattern of alliteration to name buildings using words from the Lakota language. Three other residence halls on the campus had earlier been named Wenona (meaning first-born daughter) Hall, (1917), Wecota (meaning second-born daughter) Hall (1919) and Wecota Annex (1940). Wenona and Wecota Halls are now used as office buildings and have been placed on the National Register of Historic Places listings in Brookings County, South Dakota. Wecota Annex has also become an office building; it was last used for housing students during the 2012–13 academic year. Waneta Hall continues to be used as a residence for students as of 2014.

The town of Wanatah, Indiana, located in LaPorte County, Indiana, is named for Wanata.

== Chief Wanataan II ==
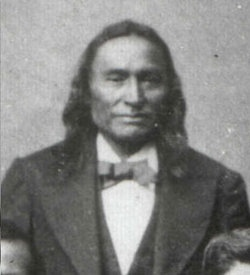
Chief Wanata II, also known as Chief Wanataan II, 1828-1897

Waneta's son was called Wanata II or Waanatan II (1828–1897). Their names are in almost every history book dealing with Minnesota and the two Dakota States. Waanatan II was born in 1828 on the Elm River (Pecan Wakpa) north of what is now Aberdeen, South Dakota. When his father was assassinated in 1848, the Pabaksa (Cut Head) band of Yanktonai split into three groups, each led by a son. Waanatan II moved to Lake Traverse (Bde Hdakinyan = Cross-Wise Lake) associating himself with his mother's people, the Sisitunwan Dakota. Waanatan II forbade Little Crow from crossing his lands to escape Federal troops during the Minnesota Uprising of the Dakota War of 1862. Suffering many hardships during the war which followed, he finally surrendered his band some five years later and resided on the Spirit Lake Reservation (Miniwakan Oyanke) in north central North Dakota.

In 1885, Chief Wanata (Waanatan II) became friends Major Israel McCreight and visited his office regularly to smoke tobacco. At the time, the twenty-one-year-old McCreight seeking adventure took the Northern Pacific Railway to its farthest point west, Devils Lake, North Dakota, Dakota Territory, and met with Indians trading buffalo bones at Fort Totten, North Dakota, to be sold as fertilizer in the lucrative St. Louis market. McCreight was impressed with the chief's dignity and bearing. "One day he signed that he wished a private interview, when he drew from his blanket a package which he exhibited as something he held more precious than any other treasure. It was carefully wrapped in old newspaper, and after it had been divested of the strings and unrolled to be read, it proved to be the parchment or treaty with Government officials, his own name inscribed as head or Grand Chief. Having thus established his old-day tribal office, he carefully refolded the document, wrapped it in the faded news sheet and returned it to the inner folds of his blanket, then nimbly squatted on the office floor, filled his pipe and enjoyed his usual half-hour smoke." Wa-na-ta's smoking pipe was his most precious possession. "A titled English ranch-owner who knew of his importance in history offered any price that the old chief would name for the pipe and pouch, but the chief disdained to listen to any offer of money. But when I squatted beside him on the floor, where he was puffing meditatively on his long red-stone pipe, to tell him of leaving next week for a trip west, he arose instantly, untied his belt, laid both pouch and pipe across his left hand and extended it to me as a present and token to be preserved after he had passed to the long sleep." McCreight forever remembered the kindness and generosity of Wa-na-ta.

Chief Wanataan II died in 1897 and is buried in the St. Michael Cemetery, St. Michael, ND.

== Sources ==
- "Chief Wanata", URL accessed 07/23/06
- Johnson, Michael, and Jonathan Smith. Tribes of the Sioux Nation. Oxford: Osprey, 2000.
