= Seminole, Summers County, West Virginia =

Seminole, West Virginia
- Unincorporated community
- Location within West Virginia Location within the United States
- Coordinates: 37°33′18″N 80°50′30″W
- Country: United States
- State: West Virginia
- County: Summers
- Elevation: 2,228 ft (679 m)
- Time zone: UTC-5 (Eastern (EST))
  - Summer (DST): UTC-4 (EDT)
- Area codes: 304 & 681
- GNIS feature ID: 1549920

Seminole is an unincorporated community in Summers County, West Virginia, United States, located approximately 12 miles (19 km) south of Hinton.

The community was named after the Seminole Indians.
