= Seminole, Harrison County, West Virginia =

- Unincorporated community
- Location within West Virginia Location within the United States
- Coordinates: 39°22′43″N 80°19′16″W
- Country: United States
- State: West Virginia
- County: Harrison
- Elevation: 1,004 ft (306 m)
- Time zone: UTC-5 (Eastern (EST))
  - Summer (DST): UTC-4 (EDT)
- Area codes: 304 & 681
- GNIS feature ID: 1555590

Seminole is an unincorporated community in Harrison County, West Virginia, United States. Seminole is located along West Virginia Route 20 near the West Fork River, 1.6 miles (2.6 km) southwest of Shinnston.
