= USS Waneta =

Tugboat of the United States Navy

History

United States
- Name: USS Waneta
- Namesake: Waneta (or "Wahneta") (ca. 1795-1848), a Sioux chief
- Builder: Ira S. Bushey and Sons, Brooklyn, New York
- Laid down: 8 September 1943
- Launched: 24 December 1943
- Completed: 25 April 1944
- Acquired: 25 April 1944
- Commissioned: Probably 25 April 1944
- Recommissioned: October 1953
- Decommissioned: March 1946 (first time); Early 1974 (second and final time)
- Reclassified: Large harbor tug (YTB-384) 15 May 1944; Medium harbor tug (YTM-384) February 1962
- Stricken: 1 April 1974
- Identification: IMO number: 8995093
- Fate: Sold for scrapping 1 February 1975

General characteristics
- Class & type: Pessacus-class harbor tug
- Displacement: 218 tons
- Length: 101 ft 0 in (30.78 m)
- Beam: 25 ft 0 in (7.62 m)
- Draft: 10 ft 0 in (3.05 m)
- Speed: 11 knots
- Complement: 10

USS Waneta (YT-384), later YTB-384, later YTM-384, was a United States Navy harbor tug in commission from 1944 to 1946 and from 1953 to 1974.

Waneta was laid down on 8 September 1943 at Brooklyn, New York, by Ira S. Bushey and Sons. She was launched on 24 December 1943, and completed and delivered to the Navy on 25 April 1944.

Reclassified a large harbor tug and redesignated YTB-384 on 15 May 1944, Waneta initially was allocated to the United States Pacific Fleet's service force and operated actively in her designed role until placed out of service, in reserve, in March 1946, berthed at San Diego, California.

Waneta remained inactive until placed in service once again in October 1953 for duty in the 6th Naval District at Charleston, South Carolina. She performed tug and tow services, waterfront fire protection, and pilotage at Charleston—being reclassified a medium harbor tug and redesignated YTM-384 in February 1962—until inactivated and placed out of service early in 1974.

Waneta was struck from the Navy List on 1 April 1974 sold by the Defense Reutilization and Marketing Service for scrapping on 1 February 1975.
