= West Virginia Route 150 =

State highway in West Virginia, United States

West Virginia Route 150
- Highland Scenic Highway
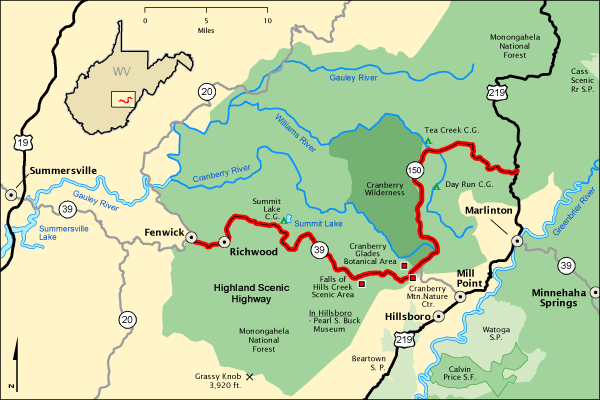

Route information
- Maintained by WVDOH
- Length: 22.5 mi (36.2 km)
- Tourist routes: Highland Scenic Highway

Major junctions
- South end: WV 39 / WV 55 near Mill Point
- North end: US 219 / WV 55 near Edray

Location
- Country: United States
- State: West Virginia
- Counties: Pocahontas

Highway system
- West Virginia State Highway System; Interstate; US; State
← WV 131	→ WV 152

West Virginia Route 150 is a 22.5-mile (36.2 km) long north–south scenic state highway in the Marlinton and Gauley Ranger Districts of the Monongahela National Forest in southeast West Virginia. The southern terminus of the route is at West Virginia Route 39 and West Virginia Route 55 northwest of Mill Point. The northern terminus is at U.S. Route 219 and WV 55 north of Edray, near Marlinton.

== Route description ==
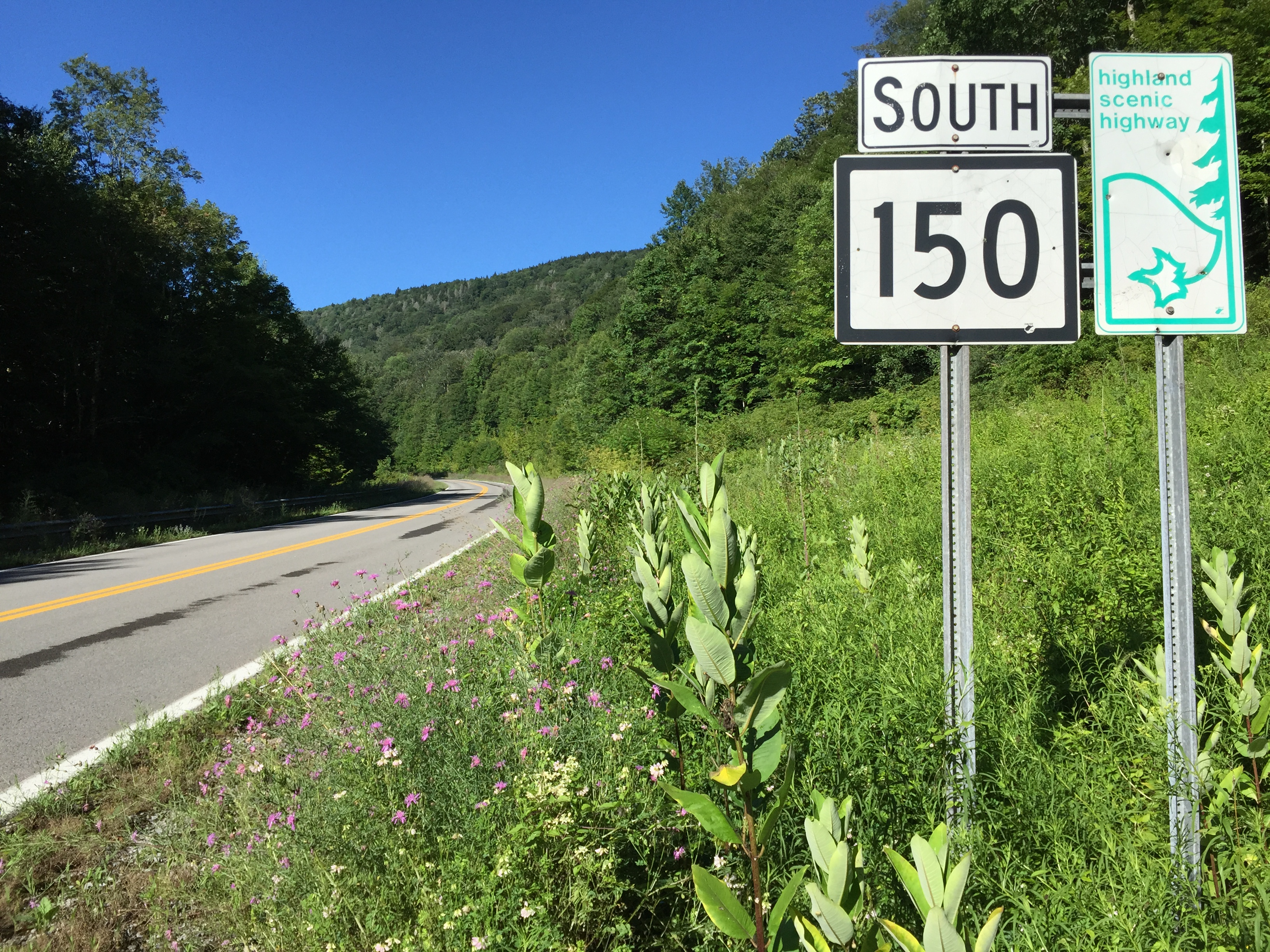
View south along WV 150 near CR 86 (Williams River Road) in western Pocahontas County

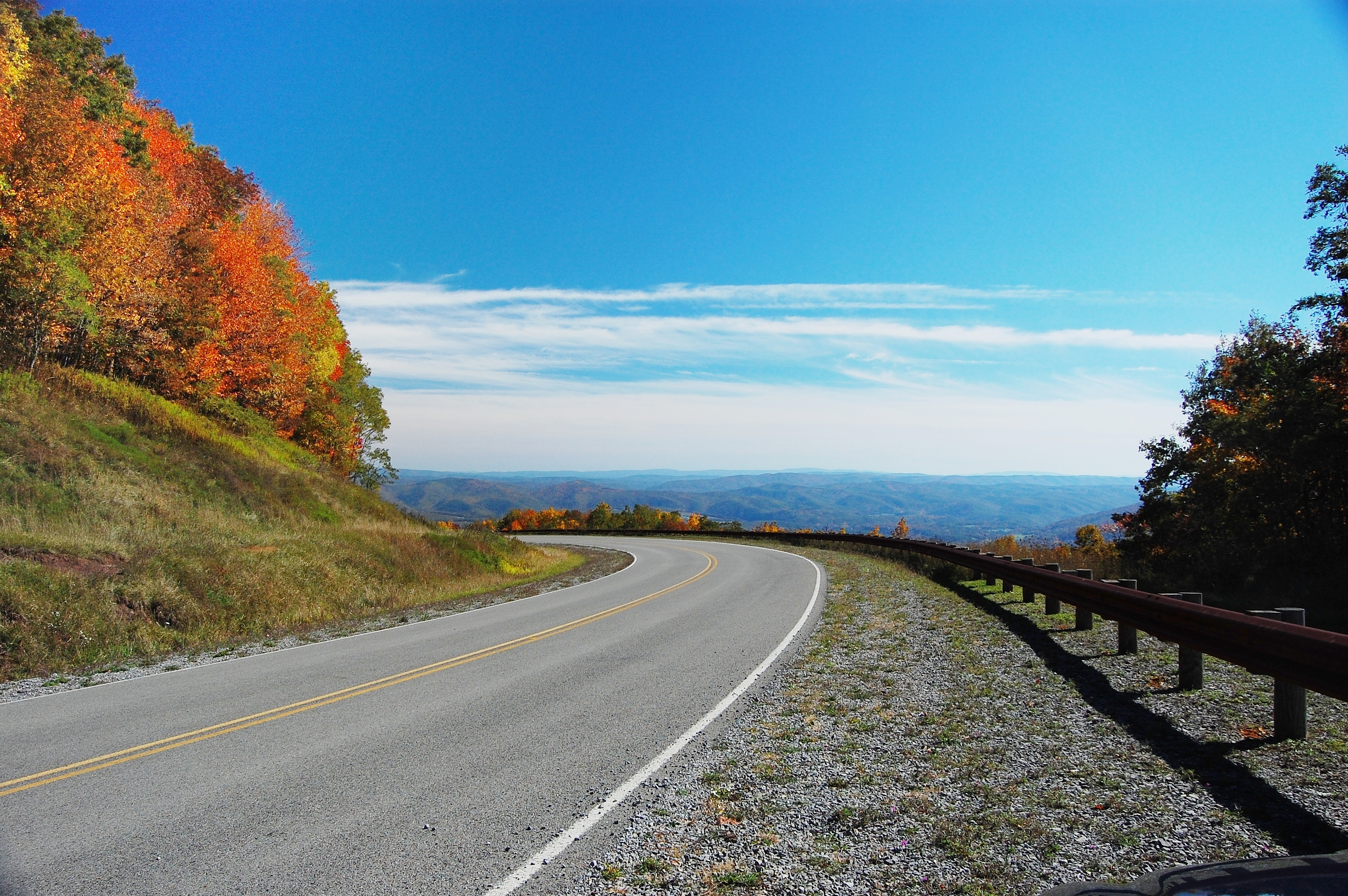
WV 150 near Woodrow

WV 150 is designated as the parkway portion of the Highland Scenic Highway. Dedicated in 1980, the road is specially designed to be a scenic byway with a meandering course along mountain ridges that reach an elevation of 4,545 feet (1,385 m). Due to these geographical conditions, the road is not maintained in the winter months. (Access is not prevented during the winter, however.) Furthermore, commercial traffic is prohibited and the speed limit is 45 miles per hour (72 km/h).

The parkway section provides several scenic overlooks of Cranberry Glades and the Cranberry Wilderness to the west and of the Ridge-and-valley Appalachians to the east, from numerous points along the Allegheny Front. The overlook at Black Mountain also provides an educational boardwalk that explains the irresponsible timbering practices that led to a destructive forest fire that left the area barren for decades.

The parkway also provides access to recreational areas along the Williams River and to several different trails with varying degrees of difficulty. The road is not plowed during the winter and commonly sees significant snow accumulations at its high elevation. It is frequently used for snowmobiling and cross-country skiing in these conditions.

== Major intersections ==
The entire route is in Pocahontas County.

Location	mi	km	Destinations	Notes
			WV 39 / WV 55 – Marlinton, Richwood	
			US 219 / WV 55 – Slatyfork, Elkins, Marlinton	
1.000 mi = 1.609 km; 1.000 km = 0.621 mi
