= Yew Mountains =

Mountain range in West Virginia, U.S.

Coordinates: 38°15′51.48″N 80°17′28.79″W

The Yew Mountains are a mountain ridge in Southern West Virginia that is part of the Allegheny Mountains. The ridge locally forms the boundary between the Allegheny Plateau to the northwest and the Ridge-and-Valley Appalachians to the southeast, and contains some of the highest peaks in West Virginia.

To the southeast, it descends steeply to the Greenbrier River valley, while to the northwest it descends more slowly within the watershed of the Gauley River. At its northeastern end, the uppermost course of the Elk River separates it from the Shavers Fork Mountain Complex, specifically Cheat Mountain and Back Allegheny Mountain. Beyond its southwestern end lies the New River Gorge and eventually Flat Top Mountain, which continues the Allegheny Plateau/Ridge-and-Valley border.

Its highest point is 4,703 feet (1,433 m) at Red Spruce Knob near its northern edge, named for the stand of red spruce at its summit, which is also the highest point of the Highland Scenic Highway, and the ninth highest peak in West Virginia. Other peaks include Black Mountain, Jacox Knob, Briery Knob, and Blue Knob. The Cranberry Wilderness of Monongahela National Forest, and the Yew Mountain Center, are within the range. There is a proposal to create a Birthplace of Rivers National Monument in the area.
