= Cranberry Wilderness =

Wilderness area in Pocahontas and Webster counties, West Virginia, U.S.

- IUCN category Ib (wilderness area)
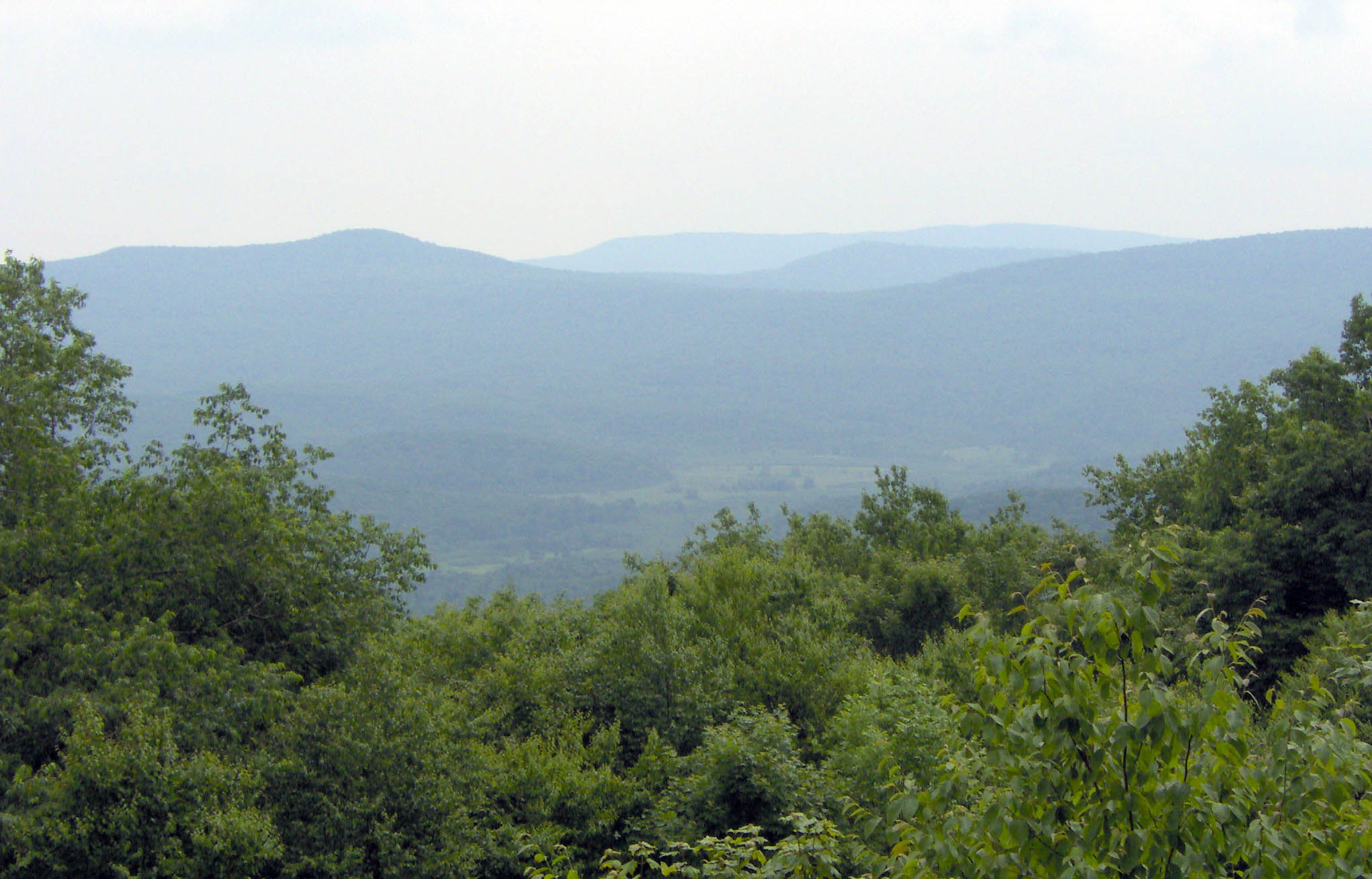
- Cranberry Wilderness

- Location within West Virginia
- Location: West Virginia, United States
- Coordinates: 38°16′36″N 80°19′57″W
- Area: 47,815 acres (193.50 km^{2})
- Elevation: 3,400 ft (1,000 m)
- Established: 1983-01-01
- Operator: Monongahela National Forest
- Website: Monongahela National Forest Wilderness Areas

The Cranberry Wilderness is a 47,815-acre (19,350 ha) U.S. wilderness area in the Monongahela National Forest of southeast West Virginia, United States. Its name derives from the nearby Cranberry Glades as well as from the Cranberry River and Cranberry Mountain. In addition to being wilderness, it is a designated black bear sanctuary.

== Geography ==
The Cranberry Wilderness is located mostly in Pocahontas County (West Virginia, USA), with a small portion in Webster County. The wilderness is drained by the Williams River and the Cranberry River, both of which are tributaries of the Gauley River, which in turn unites with the New River to form the Kanawha, a tributary of the Ohio river. The area just to the east of the Cranberry Wilderness is drained by tributaries of the Greenbrier River which flows into the New River.

The wilderness is located in the Yew Mountains, which are part of the Allegheny Mountains. The highest point in the wilderness is along Black Mountain at 4,556 feet (1,389 m), although there is a slightly higher point at 4,603 feet (1,403 m) just outside the wilderness. The lowest elevation in the wilderness is at 2,400 feet (730 m) along the Williams River at Three Forks of Williams River, where it exits the wilderness.

== History ==
=== Wilderness designation ===
Gerald Ford signed the Eastern Wilderness Act in 1975, establishing the first two Wilderness Areas on Monongahela National Forest: Otter Creek and Dolly Sods. Over the next decade, more areas were delineated and officially given the same Wilderness designation. Cranberry Wilderness, the largest Wilderness on the Monongahela, was established January 13, 1983 by the passing of H.R. 5161 (97th): A bill to designate certain lands in the Monongahela National Forest, West Virginia, as wilderness; and to designate management of certain lands for uses other than wilderness. In 2009, under the Omnibus Public Land Management Act, the Cranberry Wilderness was expanded from 35,600 acres to 47,742 acres.

=== Counterculture events ===
The national Rainbow Gathering has been held twice at the Cranberry Wilderness — in 1980 and in 2005.

=== 2009 addition ===
The Omnibus Public Land Management Act of 2009 added 11,951 acres (4,836 ha) of adjacent land to the Cranberry Wilderness. This area, which was previously known as the Cranberry Backcountry, is located between the Williams River and the Cranberry River. It protects several tributaries of both the Williams and Cranberry Rivers which are popular trout streams. The area now has a trail system connected to the original wilderness.

== Hiking trails ==
- Big Beechy Trail – 6.5 miles (10.5 kilometers)
- Birch Log Trail – 3.0 miles (4.8 kilometers)
- Black Mountain Trail – 2.0 miles (3.2 kilometers)
- County Line Trail – 9.5 miles (15.3 kilometers)
- District Line Trail – 3.0 miles (4.8 kilometers)
- Forks of the Cranberry Trail – 6.0 miles (9.7 kilometers)
- North South Trail – 14.0 miles (22.5 kilometers)
- Forks By-Pass Trail – 2.0 miles (3.2 kilometers)
- Middle Fork Trail – 9.0 miles (14.5 kilometers)
- North Fork Trail – 7.5 miles (12.1 kilometers)
- Laurelly Branch Trail – 3.5 miles (5.6 kilometers)
- Tumbling Rock Trail – 2.5 miles (4.0 kilometers)
- Little Fork Trail – 3.5 miles (5.6 kilometers)
- Lick Branch Trail – 2.1 miles (3.4 kilometers)
- Rough Run Trail – 3.0 miles (4.8 kilometers)

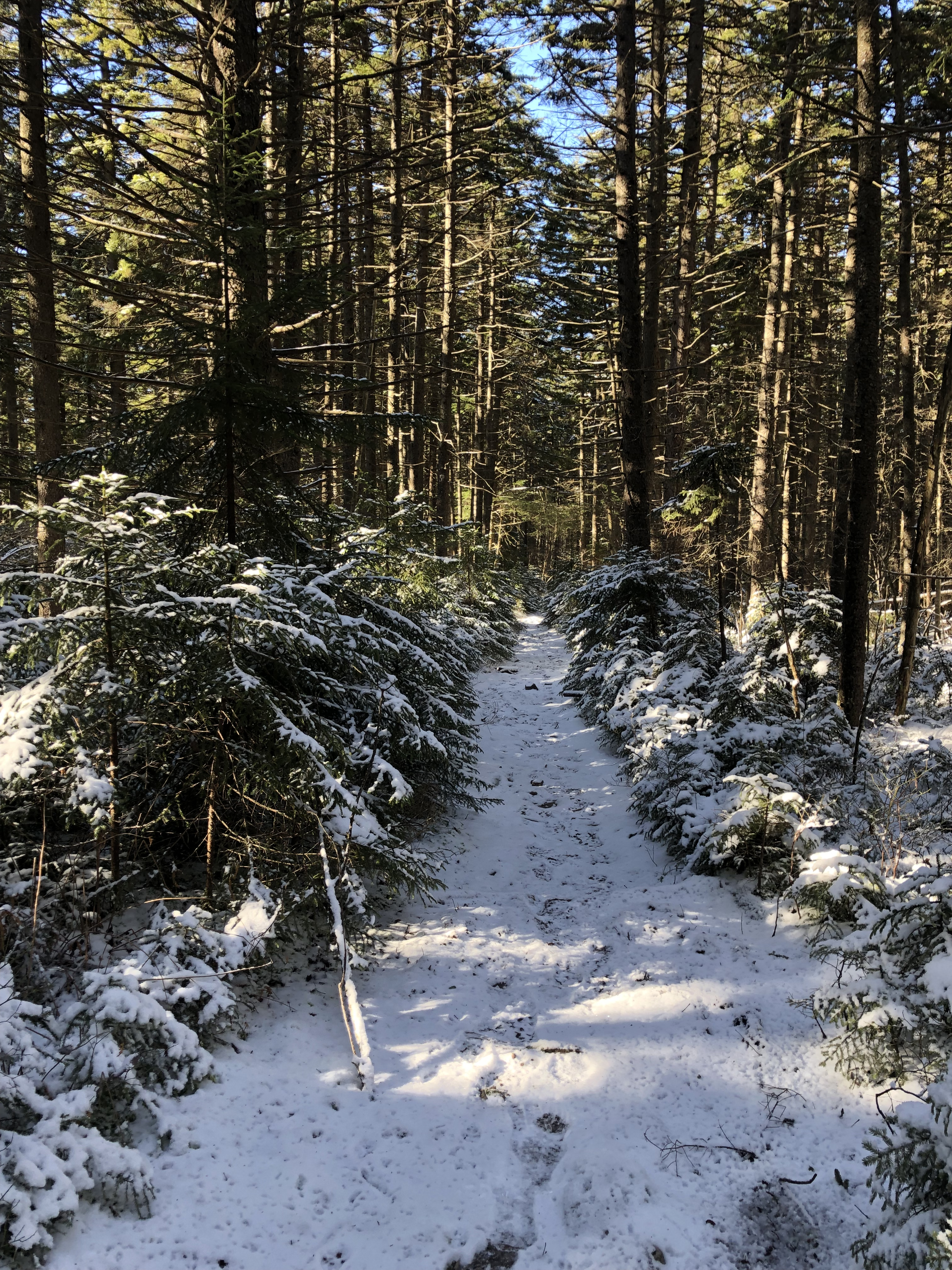
Cranberry Wilderness trail

== Mineral resources ==
The Cranberry Wilderness has been evaluated for its mineral resource potential by the U.S. Geological Survey and the U.S. Bureau of Mines. While the area is largely valued for its natural beauty and ecological significance, studies have identified some mineral deposits within its boundaries.

=== Coal ===
Bituminous coal deposits are present, primarily in the northern regions of the wilderness. Estimates suggest a total reserve base of approximately 4.18 million metric tons, with around 1.68 million metric tons considered recoverable. However, due to the wilderness designation, these resources remain untapped.

== See also ==
- List of U.S. Wilderness Areas
- Wilderness Act
