= Gauley Mills, West Virginia =

Unincorporated community in West Virginia, United States

- Unincorporated community
- Location within West Virginia Location within the United States
- Coordinates: 38°21′41″N 80°35′00″W
- Country: United States
- State: West Virginia
- County: Webster
- Elevation: 2,047 ft (624 m)
- Time zone: UTC-5 (Eastern (EST))
  - Summer (DST): UTC-4 (EDT)
- Area codes: 304 & 681
- GNIS feature ID: 1551212

Gauley Mills is an unincorporated community in Webster County, West Virginia, United States. Gauley Mills is located on the Gauley River, east of Camden-on-Gauley.

The community was so named on account of there being a sawmill on the Gauley River near the original town site.
