= Holly River =

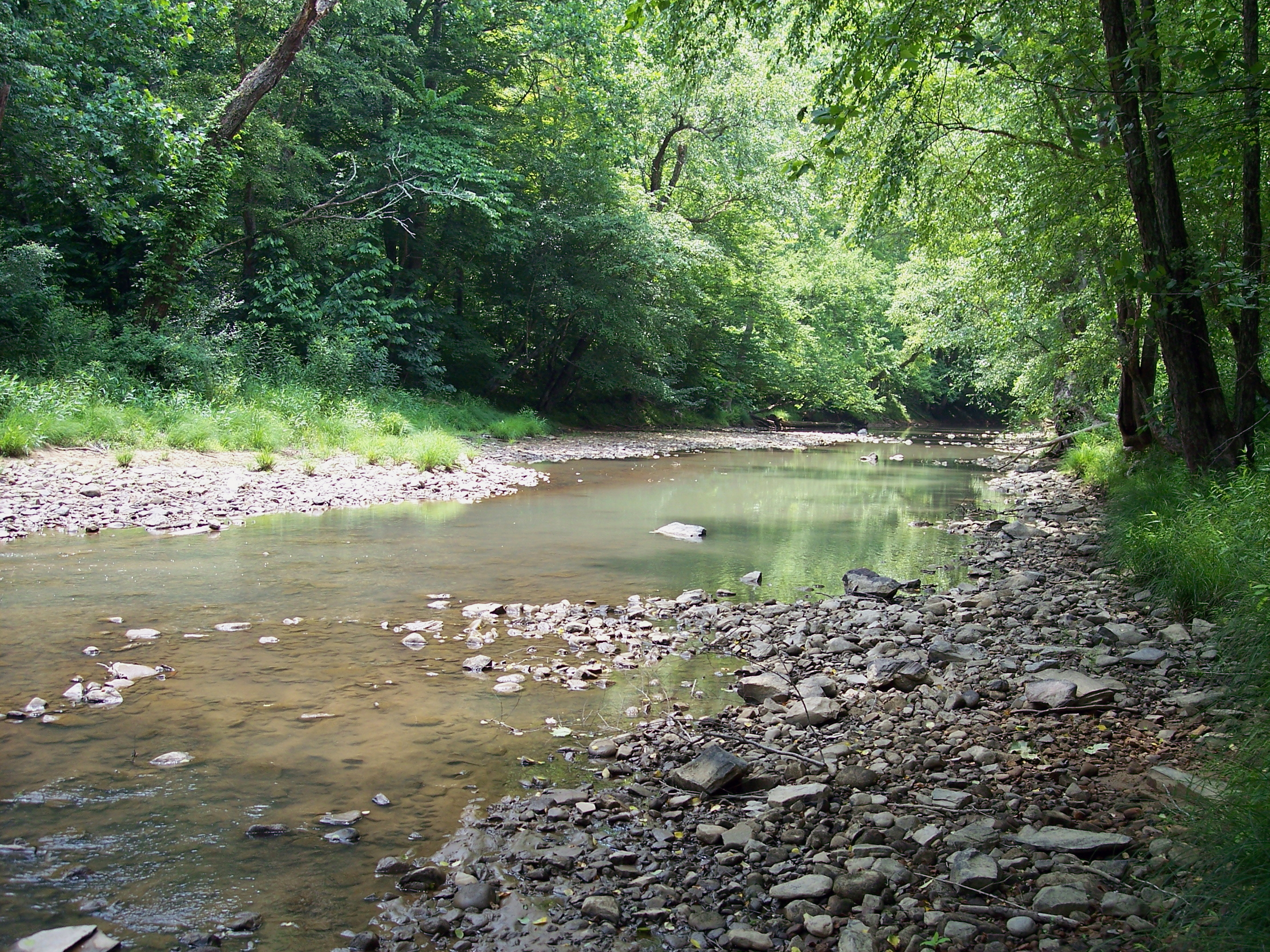
- Right Fork Holly River in the Elk River Wildlife Management Area in 2007

- Location of the mouth of the Holly River in Braxton County, West Virginia

Location
- Country: United States
- State: West Virginia
- Counties: Webster, Braxton

Physical characteristics
- Source: Left Fork Holly River
  - location: northeastern Webster County
  - coordinates: 38.6289961°N 80.2595219°W
  - length: 24.1 miles (38.8 km)
  - elevation: 2,920 ft (890 m)
- 2nd source: Right Fork Holly River
  - location: north-central Webster County
  - coordinates: 38.5498299°N 80.3409131°W
  - length: 23.9 miles (38.5 km)
  - elevation: 2,338 ft (713 m)
- Source confluence
  - location: eastern Braxton County
  - coordinates: 38.6708333°N 80.5433333°W
  - elevation: 935 ft (285 m)
- Mouth: Sutton Lake on the Elk River
  - location: eastern Braxton County
  - coordinates: 38.6534349°N 80.5912026°W
  - elevation: 915 ft (279 m)
- Length: 3.9 mi (6.3 km)
- Basin size: 148 sq mi (380 km^{2})

The Holly River is a tributary of the Elk River in central West Virginia in the United States. Via the Elk, Kanawha, and Ohio Rivers, it is part of the watershed of the Mississippi River, draining an area of 148 square miles (380 km^{2}) in a rural region of the Allegheny Mountains. It is approximately 3.9 miles (6.3 km) long, or 28 miles (45 km) including its Left Fork. The river was named for the holly bushes along its course.

The Holly River is formed by the confluence of its Left Fork and its Right Fork:

- The Left Fork Holly River, 24.1 miles (38.8 km) long, rises in northeastern Webster County, approximately 4 miles (6.4 km) southwest of Pickens, and flows generally westward through the southern part of Holly River State Park and the community of Hacker Valley into eastern Braxton County.
- The Right Fork Holly River, 23.9 miles (38.5 km) long, rises in north-central Webster County, approximately 7 miles (11 km) northeast of Webster Springs, and flows generally northwestward through the communities of Diana and Big Run into eastern Braxton County.

From the confluence of its left and right forks, the Holly River flows westward 3.9 miles (6.3 km) as an arm of Sutton Lake, formed by a dam on the Elk River, to its mouth approximately 9 miles (14 km) east of Sutton. The Holly River’s course and the lower reaches of the left and right forks are part of the Elk River Wildlife Management Area.

According to the West Virginia Department of Environmental Protection, approximately 97% of the Holly River watershed is forested, mostly deciduous. Approximately 2% is used for pasture and agriculture.

== See also ==
- List of rivers of West Virginia
