= Guardian, West Virginia =

- Unincorporated community
- Location within West Virginia Location within the United States
- Coordinates: 38°38′10″N 80°27′59″W
- Country: United States
- State: West Virginia
- County: Webster
- Elevation: 1,089 ft (332 m)
- Time zone: UTC-5 (Eastern (EST))
  - Summer (DST): UTC-4 (EDT)
- Area codes: 304 & 681
- GNIS feature ID: 1539778

Guardian is an unincorporated community in Webster County, West Virginia, United States. Guardian is located along the Right Fork Holly River and West Virginia Route 15, 11.4 miles (18.3 km) north-northwest of Webster Springs.

== History ==
Guardian had a post office, which closed on February 1, 1988. The community took its name from the local Guardian Coal and Oil Company.

Guardian was previously known as Removal from the 1880s until 1937 when the post office named changed to Guardian. Guardian was also referred to as Middleport in early postal records. The history of the town is exhaustively set out in a two volume book set Removal Reflections: A History of Guardian/Removal, West Virginia, published in 2002 and 2015.
