= Elk River Wildlife Management Area =

State Wildlife Management Area in Braxton County, West Virginia

- IUCN category V (protected landscape/seascape)
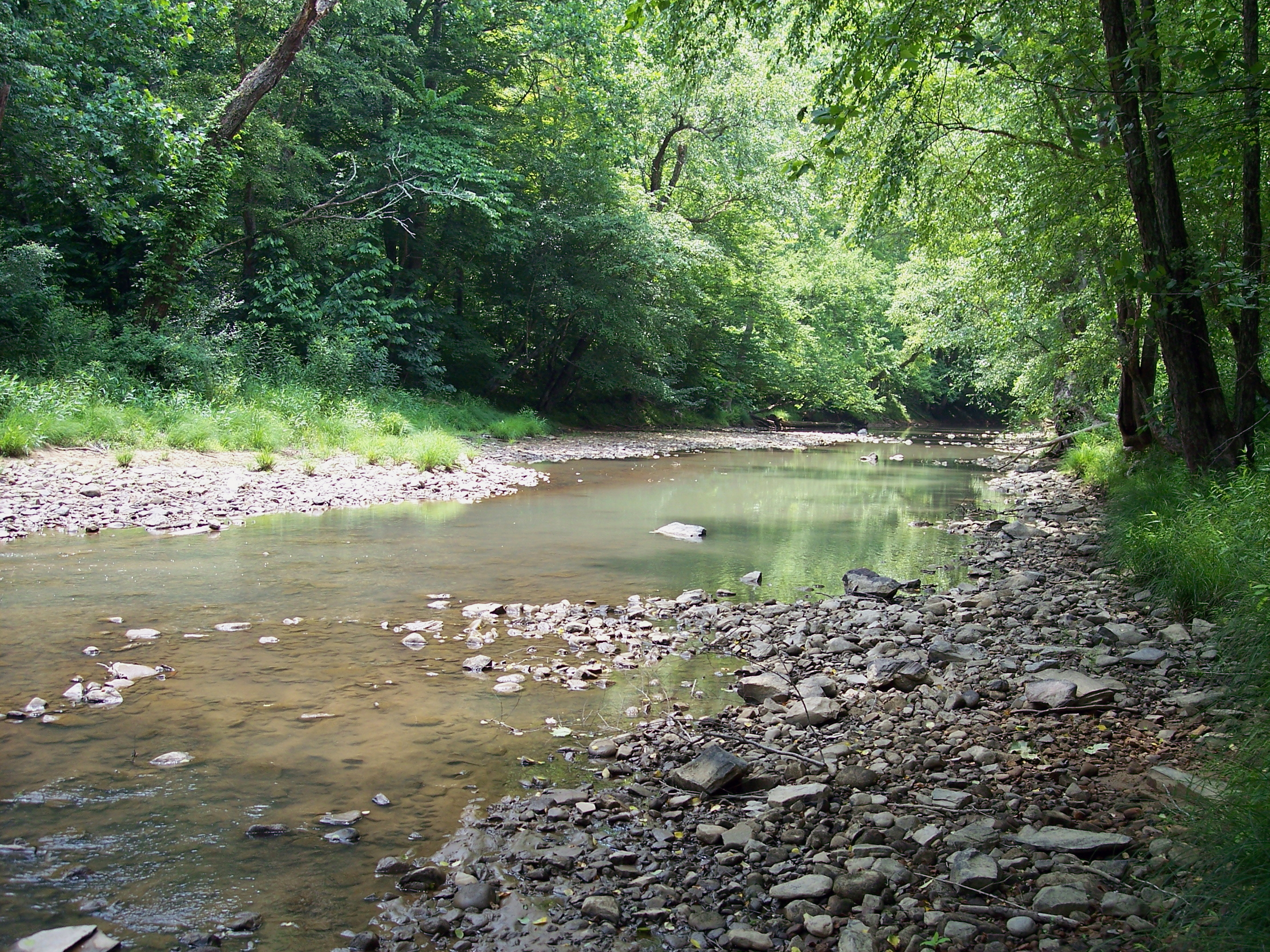
- The Right Fork of the Holly River in the Elk River Wildlife Management Area

- Location within West Virginia
- Location: Braxton, West Virginia, United States
- Coordinates: 38°37′47″N 80°33′57″W
- Area: 18,225 acres (73.75 km^{2})
- Elevation: 950 ft (290 m)
- Operator: Wildlife Resources Section, WVDNR
- Website: WVDNR District 3 Wildlife Management Areas

Elk River Wildlife Management Area is located on 18,225 acres (7,375 ha) east of Sutton in Braxton County, West Virginia. It protects lands along the Holly River and Elk River upstream of Sutton Lake.

== See also ==
- Animal conservation
- Fishing
- Hunting
- List of West Virginia rivers
- List of West Virginia wildlife management areas
