= Parcoal, West Virginia =

- Census-designated place
- Location within West Virginia Location within the United States
- Coordinates: 38°27′33″N 80°22′24″W
- Country: United States
- State: West Virginia
- County: Webster
- Elevation: 1,562 ft (476 m)

Population (2020)
  - Total: 130
- Time zone: UTC-5 (Eastern (EST))
  - Summer (DST): UTC-4 (EDT)
- Area codes: 304 & 681
- GNIS feature ID: 1555304

Parcoal is an unincorporated community and census-designated place in Webster County, West Virginia, United States. Parcoal is located along the Elk River, 2.3 miles (3.7 km) east-southeast of Webster Springs. Parcoal had a post office, which closed on November 26, 1988. The population was 130 at the 2020 census.

The community derives its name from the Pardee Curtin Lumber Company, the owner of local coal mines.
