= Williams River (West Virginia) =

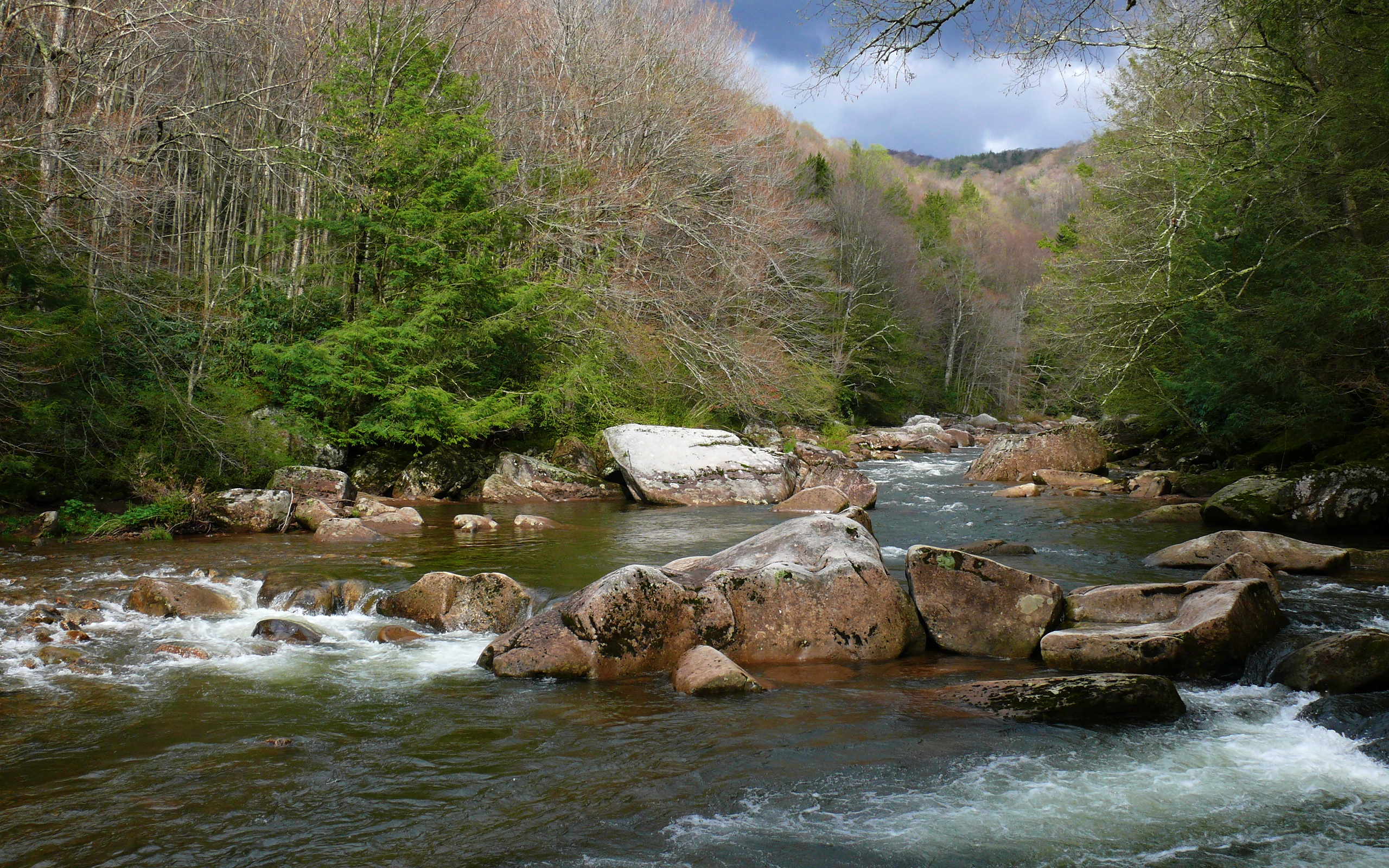
- Williams River in the Monongahela National Forest.

Location
- Country: United States
- State: West Virginia
- Counties: Pocahontas, Webster

Physical characteristics
- Source: Beaverdam Run
  - location: Day Mountain, Pocahontas County, WV
  - coordinates: 38°14′47″N 80°09′54″W
  - elevation: 3,892 ft (1,186 m)
- 2nd source: Downy Run
  - location: Day Mountain, Pocahontas County, WV
  - coordinates: 38°14′03″N 80°09′32″W
  - elevation: 3,975 ft (1,212 m)
- Source confluence
  - location: Pocahontas County, WV
  - coordinates: 38°13′43″N 80°01′10″W
  - elevation: 3,448 ft (1,051 m)
- Mouth: Gauley River
  - location: Donaldson, WV
  - coordinates: 38°23′06″N 80°30′48″W
  - elevation: 2,169 ft (661 m)
- Length: 33 mi (53 km)
- Basin size: 132 sq mi (340 km^{2})
- Discharge
  - location: Dyer, WV
  - average: 30 cu ft/s (0.85 m^{3}/s)
  - minimum: 0.62 cu ft/s (0.018 m^{3}/s)(1995)
  - maximum: 1,840 cu ft/s (52 m^{3}/s)(1971)

The Williams River is a tributary of the Gauley River, 33 miles (53 km) long, in east-central West Virginia, USA. Via the Gauley, Kanawha and Ohio Rivers, it is part of the watershed of the Mississippi River, draining an area of 132 square miles (342 km^{2}) in a sparsely populated region of the southern Allegheny Mountains and the unglaciated portion of the Allegheny Plateau.

== Name ==
The river has also been known historically as the South Fork of the Gauley River In Webster County, it collects a short tributary known as the Middle Fork Williams River, which itself collects the North Branch Middle Fork Williams River. The river most likely was named after a landowner named William Ewing, a Revolutionary War veteran who owned land in the watershed.

== Geography ==
The Williams River rises in southern Pocahontas County, approximately 5 miles (8 km) west of Marlinton, and flows initially northwardly, then westwardly into southern Webster County, where it joins the Gauley River approximately 2 miles (3 km) southeast of Cowen. It flows for much of its length in the Monongahela National Forest, including the Cranberry Wilderness, in an area that was heavily logged in the early 20th century and has since been reforested. Coal mining activity took place along the river's lower course into the 1970s.

== Fishing ==
The Williams River is regarded as one of the five best trout fishing streams in West Virginia, due to its cold water temperature, low turbidity, and frequent stockings of trout (amounting to 27,000 pounds annually) by the West Virginia Division of Natural Resources.

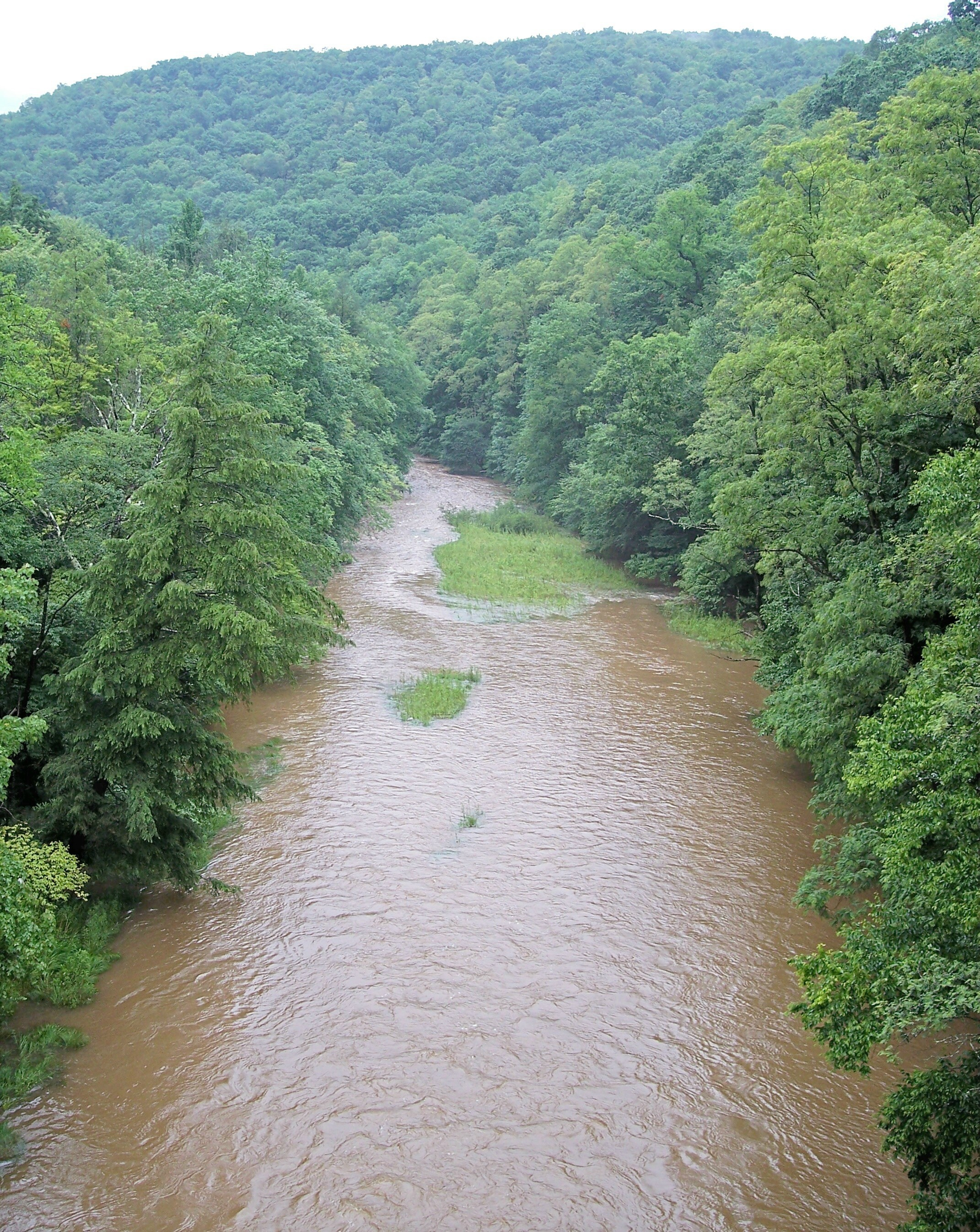
The Williams River as viewed from West Virginia Route 150 in Pocahontas County during a period of high water in 2006.

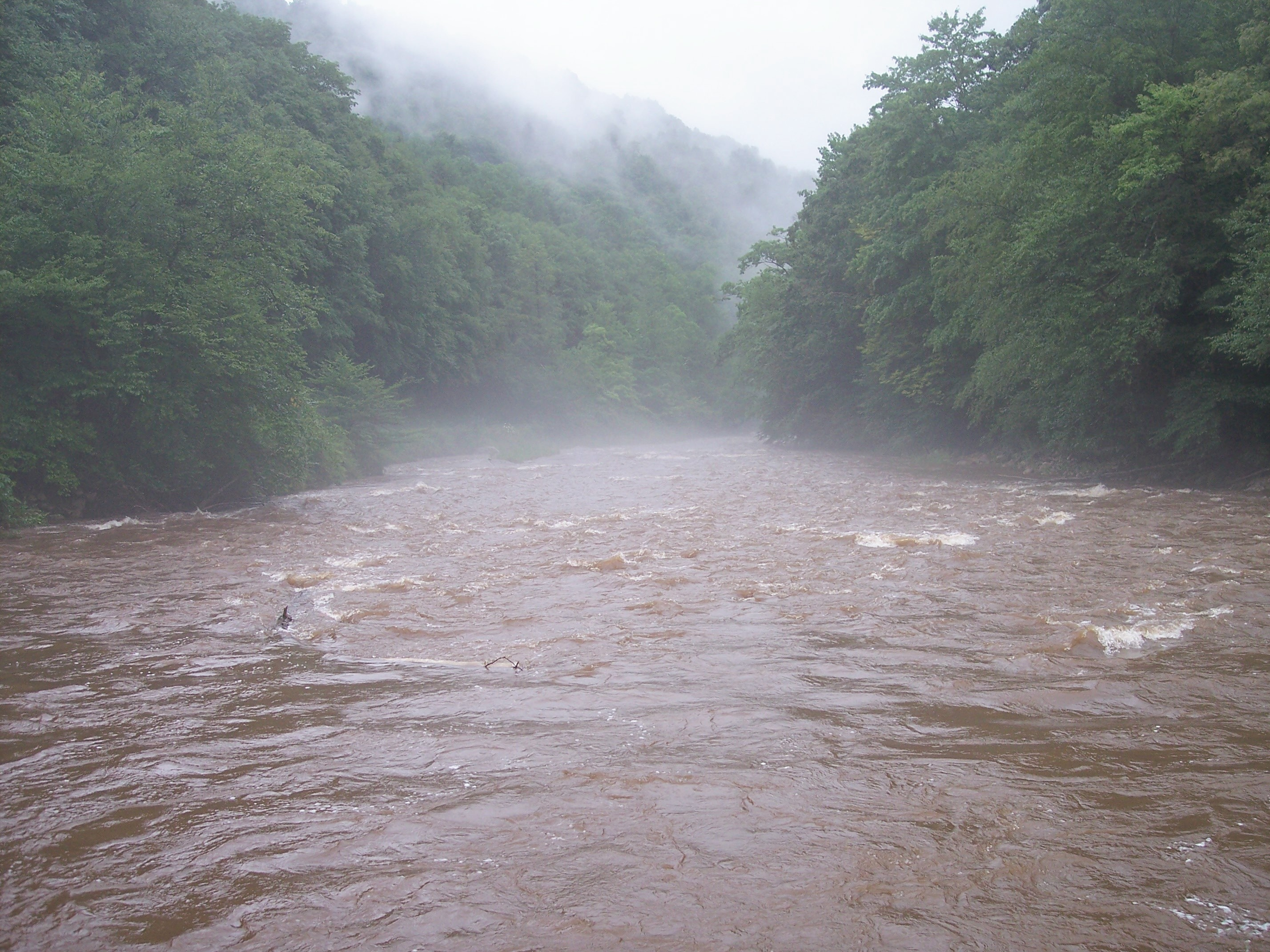
Fog on the Williams River during a period of high water in 2006.

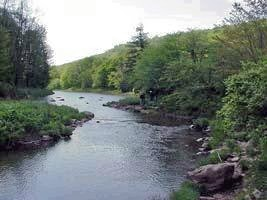
Williams River

== See also ==
- List of West Virginia rivers
