= Bolair, West Virginia =

Unincorporated community in West Virginia, United States

- Unincorporated community
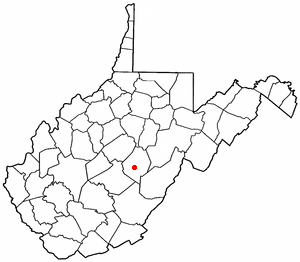
- Location of Bolair, West Virginia
- Coordinates: 38°26′15″N 80°26′38″W
- Country: United States
- State: West Virginia
- County: Webster
- Time zone: UTC-5 (Eastern (EST))
  - Summer (DST): UTC-4 (EDT)
- GNIS feature ID: 1550416

Bolair is a small unincorporated community in Webster County, West Virginia, United States, on West Virginia Route 20. To the east is the smaller town of Jerryville. Both towns are about 75 miles east of the state capital, Charleston. The Gauley River runs through the center of the community.

Several traditions attempt to explain the origin of the name.
