= Curtin, West Virginia =

Curtin, West Virginia can refer to one of two small communities:

- Curtin, Nicholas County, West Virginia
- Curtin, Webster County, West Virginia
