= Skelt, West Virginia =

Skelt
- Unincorporated community
- Location within the state of West Virginia Skelt (the United States)
- Coordinates: 38°33′19″N 80°19′19″W
- Country: United States
- State: West Virginia
- County: Webster
- Elevation: 1,929 ft (588 m)
- Time zone: UTC-5 (Eastern (EST))
  - Summer (DST): UTC-4 (EDT)
- GNIS ID: 1549931

Skelt is an unincorporated community in Webster County, West Virginia, United States.
