= Wainville, West Virginia =

Wainville
- Unincorporated community
- Location within the state of West Virginia Wainville (the United States)
- Coordinates: 38°29′29″N 80°34′22″W
- Country: United States
- State: West Virginia
- County: Webster
- Elevation: 1,575 ft (480 m)
- Time zone: UTC-5 (Eastern (EST))
  - Summer (DST): UTC-4 (EDT)
- GNIS ID: 1553354

Wainville is an unincorporated community in Webster County, West Virginia, United States.
