= Donaldson, West Virginia =

Donaldson, West Virginia may refer to the following communities in the U.S. state of West Virginia:

- Donaldson, Hampshire County, West Virginia
- Donaldson, Webster County, West Virginia
