= Woodzell, West Virginia =

Woodzell
- Unincorporated community
- Location within the state of West Virginia Woodzell (the United States)
- Coordinates: 38°31′22″N 80°18′52″W
- Country: United States
- State: West Virginia
- County: Webster
- Elevation: 3,097 ft (944 m)
- Time zone: UTC-5 (Eastern (EST))
  - Summer (DST): UTC-4 (EDT)
- GNIS ID: 1556025

Woodzell is an unincorporated community in Webster County, West Virginia, United States.
