= Curtin, Webster County, West Virginia =

Unincorporated community in West Virginia, United States

Curtin, West Virginia
- Unincorporated community
- Location within West Virginia Location within the United States
- Coordinates: 38°28′28″N 80°21′45″W
- Country: United States
- State: West Virginia
- County: Webster
- Elevation: 1,608 ft (490 m)
- Time zone: UTC-5 (Eastern (EST))
  - Summer (DST): UTC-4 (EDT)
- Area codes: 304 & 681
- GNIS feature ID: 1554245

Curtin is an unincorporated community in Webster County, West Virginia, United States. Curtin is located along the Elk River, 2.6 miles (4.2 km) east of Webster Springs.
