= Dorrtown, Webster County, West Virginia =

Unincorporated community in West Virginia, United States

Dorrtown
- Unincorporated community
- Location within the state of West Virginia Dorrtown (the United States)
- Coordinates: 38°29′2″N 80°25′20″W
- Country: United States
- State: West Virginia
- County: Webster
- Elevation: 1,440 ft (440 m)
- Time zone: UTC-5 (Eastern (EST))
  - Summer (DST): UTC-4 (EDT)
- GNIS ID: 1560589

Dorrtown is an unincorporated community in Webster County, West Virginia, United States.
