= Morton House (Webster Springs, West Virginia) =

Historic house in West Virginia, United States

- U.S. National Register of Historic Places
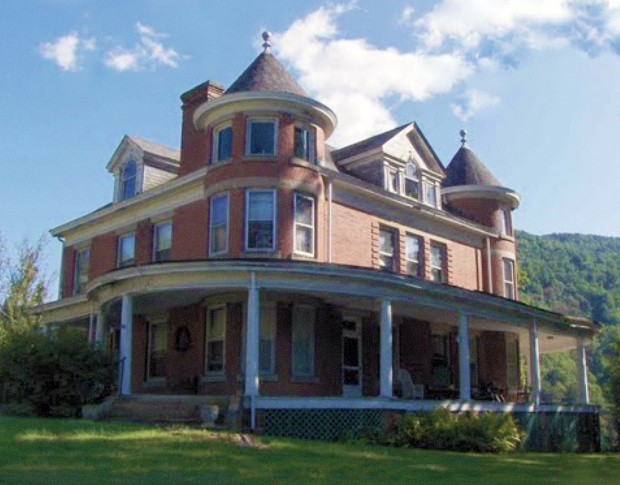

- Location within West Virginia Location within the United States
- Location: Union St., Webster Springs, West Virginia
- Coordinates: 38°28′33″N 80°24′32″W
- Built: 1912
- Architectural style: Queen Anne
- NRHP reference No.: 86000795
- Added to NRHP: April 15, 1986

Morton House, also known as Morton Mansion, is a historic home with Queen Anne style located at Webster Springs, Webster County, West Virginia that dates to 1912. It is a massive red brick dwelling set on a solid stone foundation, with a hipped roof and features a pair of 2 1/2-story turrets and each is topped with a conical shingled roof and capped with wooden finials. It also has a wraparound porch around 3/4 of the house.

It was the home of Eskridge H. Morton (1866-1940) a prominent local attorney and elected official in the West Virginia State Government.

It was listed on the National Register of Historic Places in 1986.
