= Dogway, West Virginia =

Unincorporated community in West Virginia, United States

Dogway
- Unincorporated community
- Location within the state of West Virginia Dogway (the United States)
- Coordinates: 38°14′27″N 80°22′21″W
- Country: United States
- State: West Virginia
- County: Webster
- Elevation: 3,127 ft (953 m)
- Time zone: UTC-5 (Eastern (EST))
  - Summer (DST): UTC-4 (EDT)
- GNIS ID: 1554316

Dogway is an unincorporated community in Webster County, West Virginia, United States.

The community takes its name from Dogway Fork creek.
