= Mayton, West Virginia =

Mayton
- Unincorporated community
- Location within the state of West Virginia Mayton (the United States)
- Coordinates: 38°41′23″N 80°17′21″W
- Country: United States
- State: West Virginia
- County: Webster
- Elevation: 2,598 ft (792 m)
- Time zone: UTC-5 (Eastern (EST))
  - Summer (DST): UTC-4 (EDT)
- GNIS ID: 1727876

Mayton was an unincorporated community in Webster County, West Virginia.
