= Buffalo Bull Knob =

Mountain in West Virginia, United States

- Location within the United States
- Location: West Virginia
- Coordinates: 38°30′53.4″N 80°23′16.3″W

Buffalo Bull Knob is a summit in Webster County, West Virginia, near Webster Springs. With an elevation of 2,799 feet (853 m), Buffalo Bull Knob is the 445th highest summit in the state of West Virginia.

The summit's name recalls an incident when one of the last wild buffaloes in the area was killed by a hunter near its base.
