= Halo, West Virginia =

Halo
- Unincorporated community
- Location within the state of West Virginia Halo (the United States)
- Coordinates: 38°27′0″N 80°32′12″W
- Country: United States
- State: West Virginia
- County: Webster
- Time zone: UTC-5 (Eastern (EST))
  - Summer (DST): UTC-4 (EDT)
- GNIS feature ID: 1554629

Halo is an unincorporated community in Webster County, West Virginia, United States.
