= Hodam, West Virginia =

Hodam
- Unincorporated community
- Location within the state of West Virginia Hodam (the United States)
- Coordinates: 38°37′13″N 80°22′57″W
- Country: United States
- State: West Virginia
- County: Webster
- Elevation: 1,598 ft (487 m)
- Time zone: UTC-5 (Eastern (EST))
  - Summer (DST): UTC-4 (EDT)
- GNIS ID: 1549746

Hodam is an unincorporated community in Webster County, West Virginia, United States.
