= Cherry Falls, West Virginia =

Unincorporated community in West Virginia, United States

Cherry Falls
- Unincorporated community
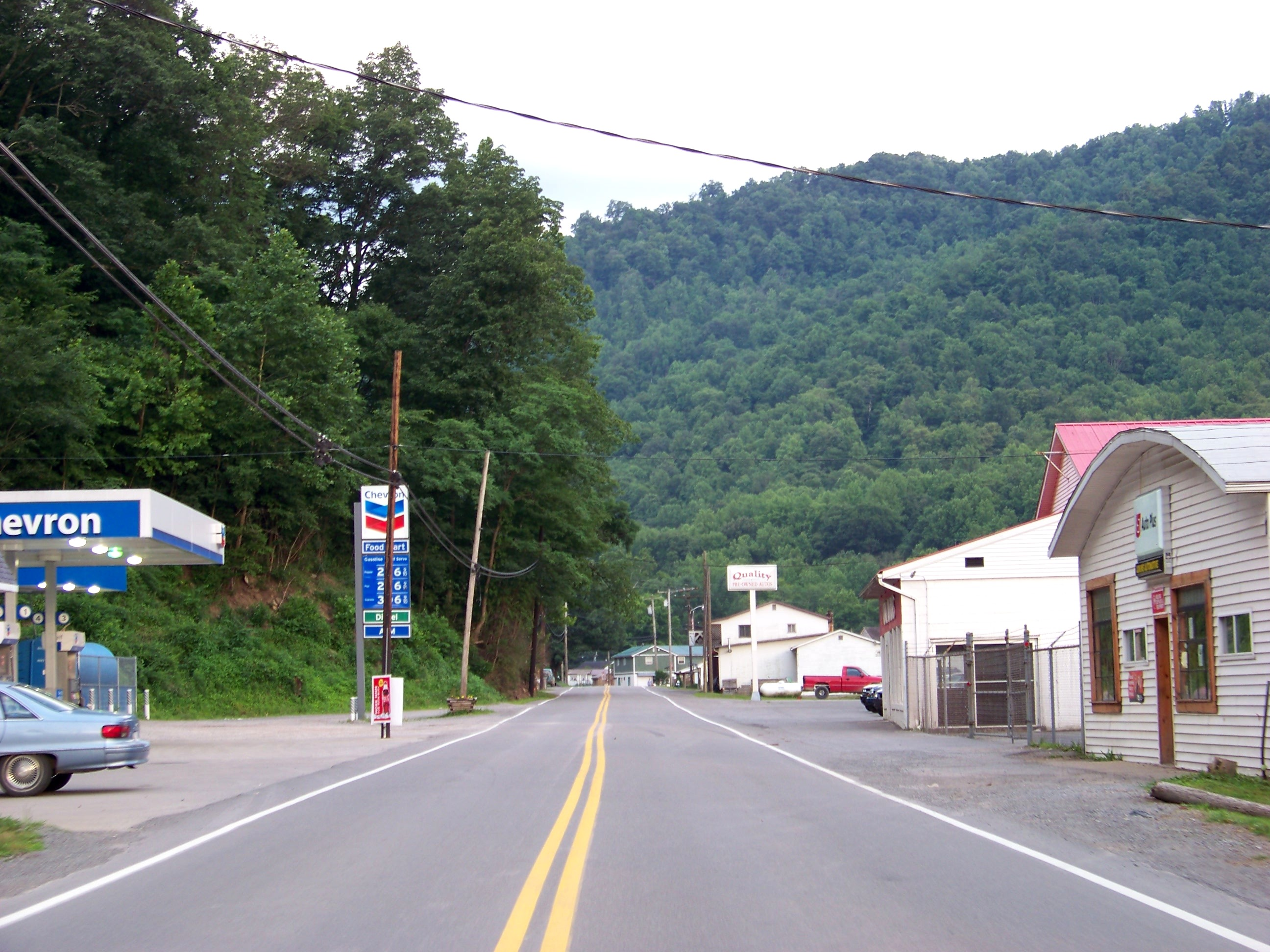

- Location within the state of West Virginia Cherry Falls (the United States)
- Coordinates: 38°27′56″N 80°23′38″W
- Country: United States
- State: West Virginia
- County: Webster
- Elevation: 1,506 ft (459 m)
- Time zone: UTC-5 (Eastern (EST))
  - Summer (DST): UTC-4 (EDT)
- GNIS ID: 1554118

Cherry Falls is an unincorporated community in Webster County, West Virginia, United States.
