= West Virginia Route 15 =

State highway in West Virginia, United States

West Virginia Route 15

Route information
- Maintained by WVDOH
- Length: 64.1 mi (103.2 km)

Major junctions
- West end: WV 4 near Sutton
- WV 20 in Diana
- East end: US 219 / WV 55 in Valley Head

Location
- Country: United States
- State: West Virginia
- Counties: Braxton, Webster, Randolph

Highway system
- West Virginia State Highway System; Interstate; US; State
| ← WV 14 | → WV 16 |

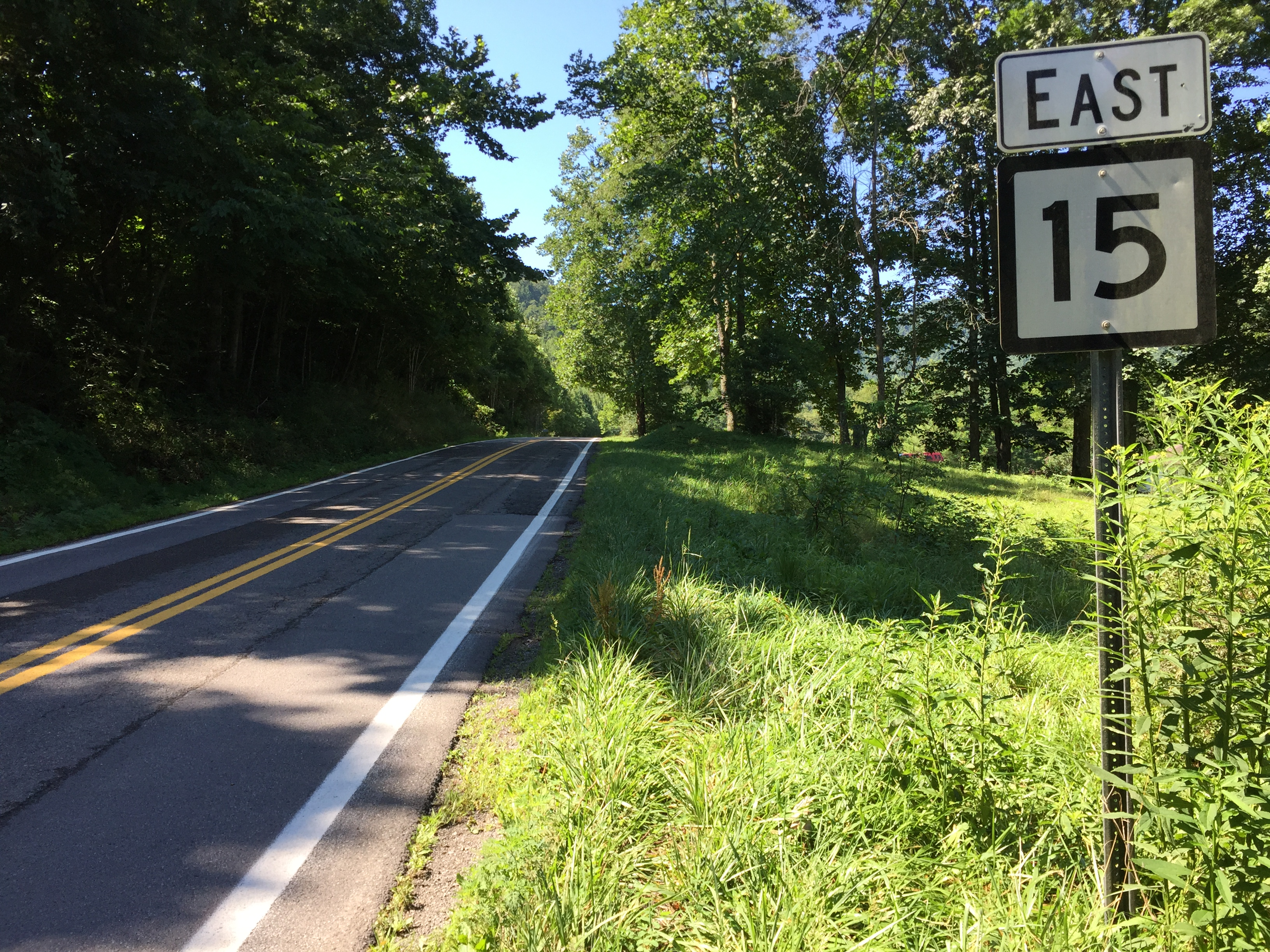
West Virginia Route 15 at Webster County Route 5–3 in Guardian, West Virginia

West Virginia Route 15 is an east–west state highway in the central portion of the U.S. state of West Virginia. The western terminus of the route is at West Virginia Route 4 northeast of Sutton, Braxton County. The eastern terminus is at U.S. Route 219 and West Virginia Route 55 in Valley Head, Randolph County.

== Major intersections ==
| County | Location | mi | km | Destinations | Notes |
|---|---|---|---|---|---|
| Braxton | Laurel Fork | | | WV 4 to I-79 – Sutton, Flatwoods | |
| Webster | | | | WV 20 north – Buckhannon, Holly River State Park | west end of WV 20 overlap |
| Webster | Webster Springs | | | WV 20 south | east end of WV 20 overlap |
| Randolph | Valley Head | | | US 219 / WV 55 – Elkins, Huttonsville, Marlinton | |
1.000 mi = 1.609 km; 1.000 km = 0.621 mi: Concurrency terminus
