= Big Run, Webster County, West Virginia =

Unincorporated community in West Virginia, United States

Big Run
- Unincorporated community
- Location within the state of West Virginia Big Run (the United States)
- Coordinates: 38°35′59″N 80°28′19″W
- Country: United States
- State: West Virginia
- County: Webster
- Time zone: UTC-5 (Eastern (EST))
  - Summer (DST): UTC-4 (EDT)
- GNIS feature ID: 1535900

Big Run is an unincorporated community on the Right Fork of the Holly River in Webster County, West Virginia, United States.
