= Jumbo, West Virginia =

Jumbo
- Unincorporated community
- Location within the state of West Virginia Jumbo (the United States)
- Coordinates: 38°33′45″N 80°23′16″W
- Country: United States
- State: West Virginia
- County: Webster
- Elevation: 1,660 ft (510 m)
- Time zone: UTC-5 (Eastern (EST))
  - Summer (DST): UTC-4 (EDT)
- GNIS ID: 1541040

Jumbo is an unincorporated community in Webster County, West Virginia, United States.
