= Dyer, West Virginia =

- Unincorporated community
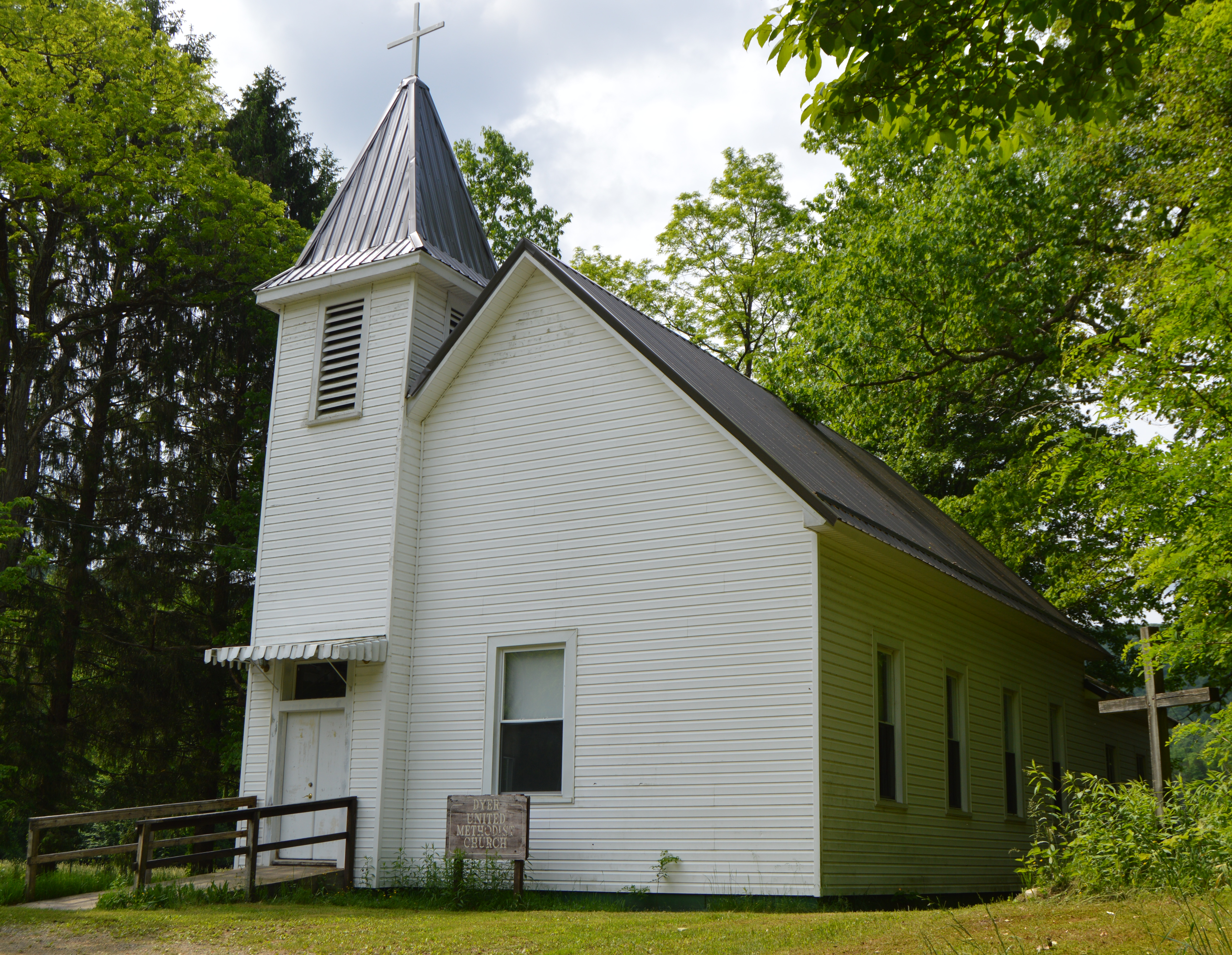
- Methodist church

- Location within West Virginia Location within the United States
- Coordinates: 38°22′52″N 80°28′29″W
- Country: United States
- State: West Virginia
- County: Webster
- Elevation: 2,221 ft (677 m)
- Time zone: UTC-5 (Eastern (EST))
  - Summer (DST): UTC-4 (EDT)
- Area codes: 304 & 681
- GNIS feature ID: 1554342

Dyer, originally Haynes, is an unincorporated community in Webster County, West Virginia, United States. Dyer is located on the Williams River and County Route 46, 4.9 miles (7.9 km) east-southeast of Cowen.

The village of Haynes received a post office in 1893. In 1911, the name was changed to "Dyer" after George M. Dyer, postmaster from 1893 to 1923. The post office was discontinued in 1938, and the mail redirected to Cowen.
