= Edray, West Virginia =

Unincorporated community in West Virginia, United States

- Unincorporated community
- Location within West Virginia Location within the United States
- Coordinates: 38°16′28″N 80°05′29″W
- Country: United States
- State: West Virginia
- County: Pocahontas
- Elevation: 2,411 ft (735 m)
- Time zone: UTC-5 (Eastern (EST))
  - Summer (DST): UTC-4 (EDT)
- Area codes: 304 & 681
- GNIS feature ID: 1558358

Edray is an unincorporated community in Pocahontas County, West Virginia, United States. It is located near U.S. Route 219 and West Virginia Route 55, 3.5 miles (5.6 km) north of Marlinton. It is home to the Edray State Trout Hatchery.

The community derives its name from the ancient city of Edrei.
