= Miller Mill Run =

Stream in West Virginia, U.S.

Coordinates: 38°25′17″N 80°24′30″W

Miller Mill Run is a stream in the U.S. state of West Virginia.

Miller Mill Run most likely derives its name from John Miller, a pioneer settler.

== See also ==
- List of rivers of West Virginia
