= Sutton Lake (West Virginia) =

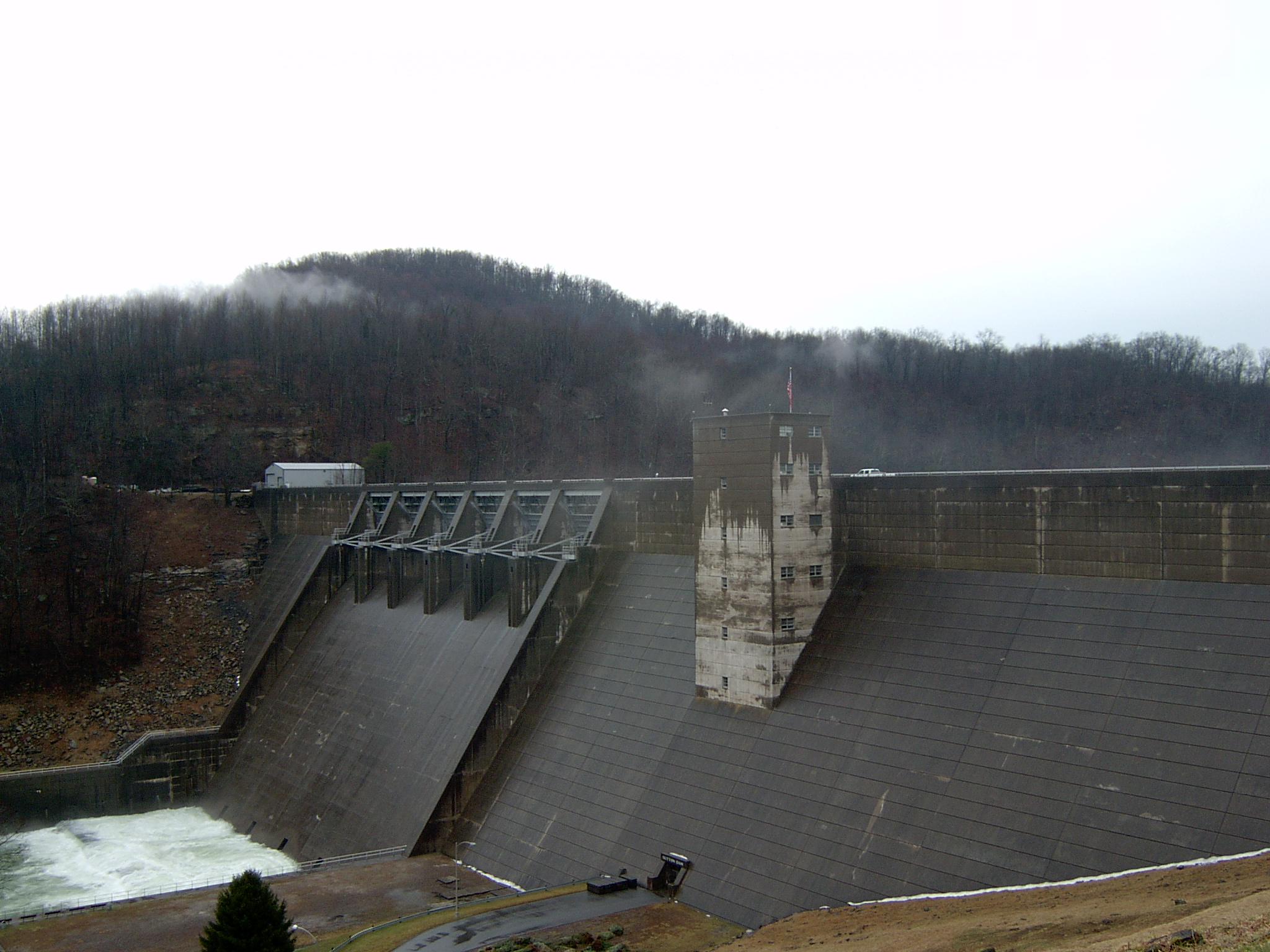
- Sutton Dam on the Elk River (2004)

- Location within West Virginia
- Location: Braxton / Webster counties, West Virginia, United States
- Coordinates: 38.66204°N 80.69315°W
- Type: reservoir
- Primary inflows: Elk River
- Primary outflows: Elk River
- Basin countries: United States
- Max. length: 14 mi (23 km)
- Surface area: 1,520 acres (6 km^{2})
- Max. depth: 125 ft (38 m)
- Shore length^{1}: 40 mi (64 km)
- ^{1} Shore length is not a well-defined measure.

Sutton Lake is a 1,520-acre (6 km^{2}) reservoir on the Elk River in Braxton and Webster counties, West Virginia. Sutton Lake is located just upstream of Sutton. It was authorized by Congress in the Flood Control Act of 1938. Construction of the dam began in 1956 and was completed in 1961. The dam is 210 feet (64 m) high, 1,178 feet (359 m) long, and constructed of concrete. The lake was named by Congressional action, Public Law 90-46, July 4, 1967.

== General information ==
The lake stretches 14 miles along the Elk River, with many coves along its 40 miles of shoreline. The lake is 125 feet deep at the dam. Sutton Dam is located just above the Town of Sutton, 101 miles above the mouth of the Elk River in Charleston. It is a concrete-gravity structure 210 feet high, 1,178 feet long, and 195 feet wide at the base. It controls a 537 square mile drainage area, including the upper Elk River, and the Holly River. Sutton Dam was built primarily for flood control on the Elk, Kanawha and Ohio Rivers. During periods of flooding, water is stored behind the dam, frequently reducing the severity of flooding below the dam. It was completed in 1961 at a cost of $35 million. Flood damages have been reduced by more than $375 million by flood control efforts at Sutton Dam. The U.S. Army Corps of Engineers operates and maintains the dam and project recreation facilities.

== Environment ==
Some reports of a 2013 Wake Forest University study of selenium contamination in Sutton Lake in North Carolina (allegedly due to coal ash from the Sutton power plant of Duke Energy), erroneously attributed this contamination to Sutton Lake in West Virginia. Sutton Lake in North Carolina is on the Cape Fear River; whereas Sutton Lake in West Virginia is on the Elk River, an entirely different river drainage basin.
