= Cougar Fork =

Stream in West Virginia, U.S.

Coordinates: 38°37′27″N 80°25′49″W

Cougar Fork is a stream in the U.S. state of West Virginia.

Cougar Fork may derive its name from John R. Cogar, an early settler.

== See also ==
- List of rivers of West Virginia
