= Donaldson, Webster County, West Virginia =

Unincorporated community in West Virginia, United States

Donaldson, West Virginia
- Unincorporated community
- Location within West Virginia Location within the United States
- Coordinates: 38°23′14″N 80°30′42″W
- Country: United States
- State: West Virginia
- County: Webster
- Elevation: 2,192 ft (668 m)
- Time zone: UTC-5 (Eastern (EST))
  - Summer (DST): UTC-4 (EDT)
- Area codes: 304 & 681
- GNIS feature ID: 1550942

Donaldson is an unincorporated community in Webster County, West Virginia, United States. Donaldson is located on the Gauley River at County Route 46, 2.9 miles (4.7 km) east-southeast of Cowen.
