= Black Mountain (West Virginia) =

Mountain in West Virginia, United States

Coordinates: 38.2353°N 80.2381°W

Black Mountain is a summit in West Virginia, United States. It is one of the Yew Mountains in Pocahontas County. With an elevation of 4,603 feet (1,403 m), Black Mountain is the 14th highest summit in the state of West Virginia.

Black Mountain was named for the dark, forested tracts near it.
