= Elk River (West Virginia) =

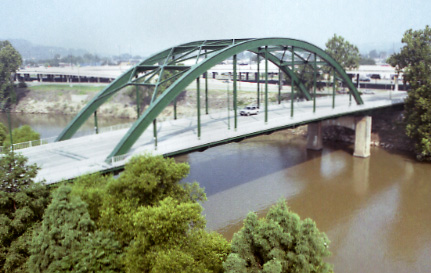
- Elk River in Charleston, West Virginia

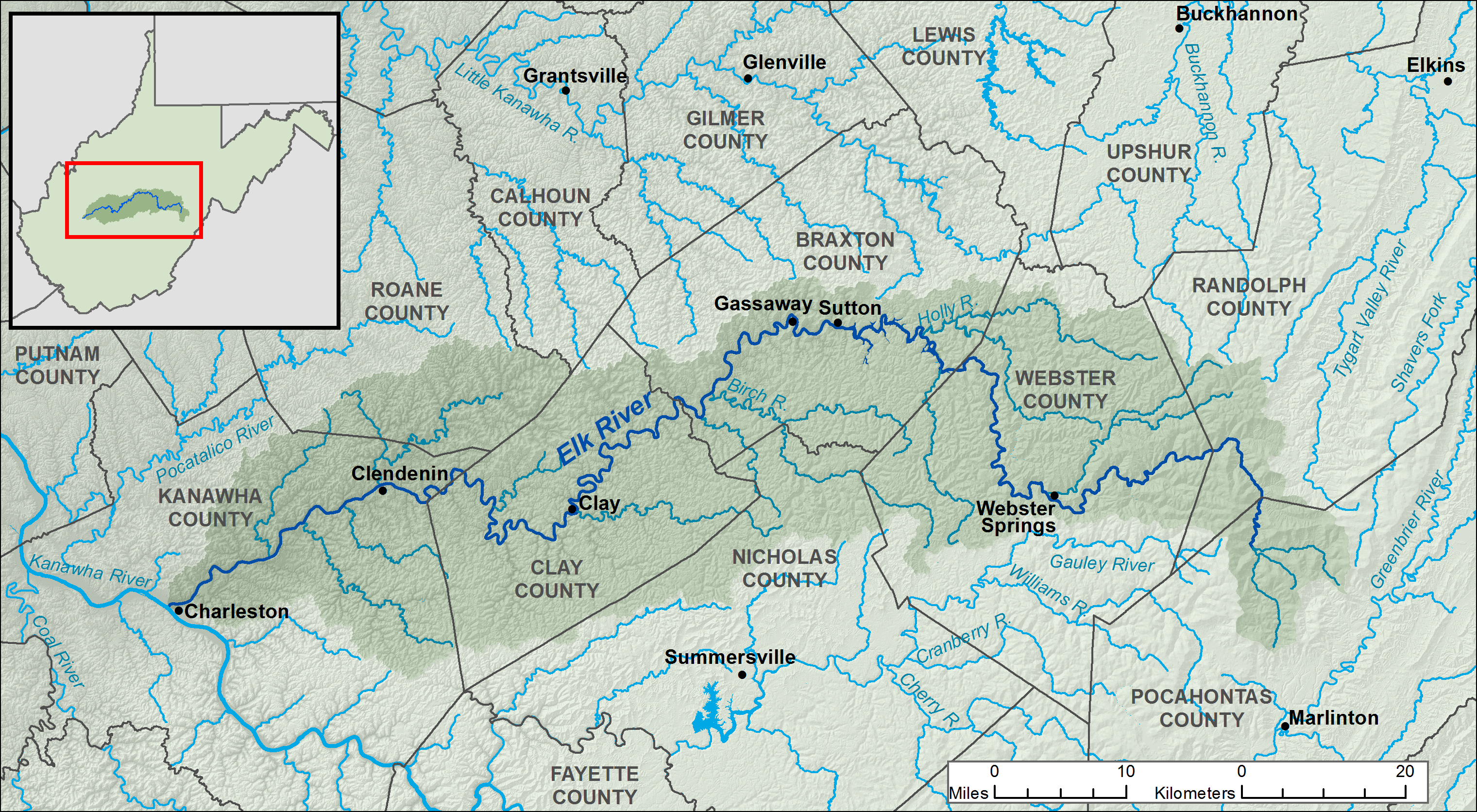
- A map of Elk River and its watershed

Location
- Country: United States
- State: West Virginia
- Counties: Pocahontas, Randolph, Webster, Braxton, Clay, Kanawha

Physical characteristics
- Source: Old Field Fork
  - location: Elk Mountain, Pocahontas County
  - coordinates: 38°18′24″N 80°06′18″W
  - elevation: 3,557 ft (1,084 m)
- 2nd source: Big Spring Fork
  - location: Pocahontas County
  - coordinates: 38°22′32″N 80°00′34″W
  - elevation: 3,655 ft (1,114 m)
- Source confluence
  - location: Slatyfork
  - coordinates: 38°25′08″N 80°07′48″W
  - elevation: 2,667 ft (813 m)
- Mouth: Kanawha River
  - location: Charleston
  - coordinates: 38°21′18″N 81°38′42″W
  - elevation: 574 ft (175 m)
- Length: 172 mi (277 km)
- Discharge
  - location: Queen Shoals
  - average: 2,650 cu ft/s (75 m^{3}/s)
  - minimum: 271 cu ft/s (7.7 m^{3}/s)(1976)
  - maximum: 14,000 cu ft/s (400 m^{3}/s)(1972)

Basin features
- Tributaries
  - left: Birch River
  - right: Holly River

The Elk River is a tributary of the Kanawha River, 172 miles (277 km) long, in central West Virginia in the United States. Via the Kanawha and Ohio rivers, it is part of the watershed of the Mississippi River.

== Course ==
The Elk is formed in the Allegheny Mountains in Pocahontas County by the confluence of two short streams, the Big Spring Fork and the Old Field Fork, which join near the community of Slatyfork. It flows above ground for several miles before it sinks into a network of caverns and flows underground for more than five miles. The old riverbed of solid rock, however, remains above ground in this section known as "The Dries." It follows a generally westward course across the unglaciated Allegheny Plateau, through Randolph, Webster, Braxton, Clay, and Kanawha Counties, past the towns of Webster Springs, Sutton, Gassaway, Clay, Clendenin, and Elkview before joining the Kanawha River at Charleston.

At Sutton, a U.S. Army Corps of Engineers concrete dam causes the Elk to form Sutton Lake.

The Elk's largest tributaries are the Holly River and the Birch River, both of which join it in Braxton County.

The upper portion of the river, above Sutton Lake, is a popular coldwater trout stream. Some reports of a 2013 Wake Forest University study of selenium contamination in Sutton Lake in North Carolina (allegedly due to coal ash from the Sutton power plant of Duke Energy). erroneously attributed this contamination to Sutton Lake in West Virginia. Sutton Lake in North Carolina is on the Cape Fear River; whereas Sutton Lake in West Virginia is on the Elk River, an entirely different river drainage basin.

Below Sutton Lake, is a high-gradient warmwater fishery well known for its muskellunge, walleye and smallmouth bass fishing. The Elk River serves as the source of water for 1500 miles of pipeline that carry its water to customers in central and southwestern West Virginia.

== Name ==
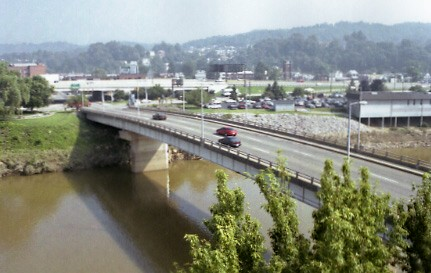
Elk River near its mouth in Charleston in 2001

The river's name most likely comes from the Native Americans of the area, who saw great numbers of elk near the stream.

According to the Geographic Names Information System, the Elk River has also been known historically as:

- Pe-quo-ni
- Pe-quo-ni-cepe
- Pequoni
- Tis-chil-waugh
- Tiskelewah
- Tiskelwah
- To-que-man
- To-qui-min-cepe

== History ==
=== Chemical spill ===
In January 2014 a spill of the chemical 4-methylcyclohexane methanol, a foaming agent used as a wash component in the coal-preparation process, required West Virginia authorities to supply water to as many as 300,000 people in nine of the state's counties. The effect of the Elk River chemical spill to the critically endangered diamond darter fish, known only to live in the Elk River, is still unknown.

== Recreation ==
=== Fishing ===
Multiple West Virginia state record fish were caught along the Elk River.

== See also ==
- Kanawha River
- List of West Virginia rivers
- List of West Virginia State Fishing Records
