= Camden-on-Gauley, West Virginia =

- Town
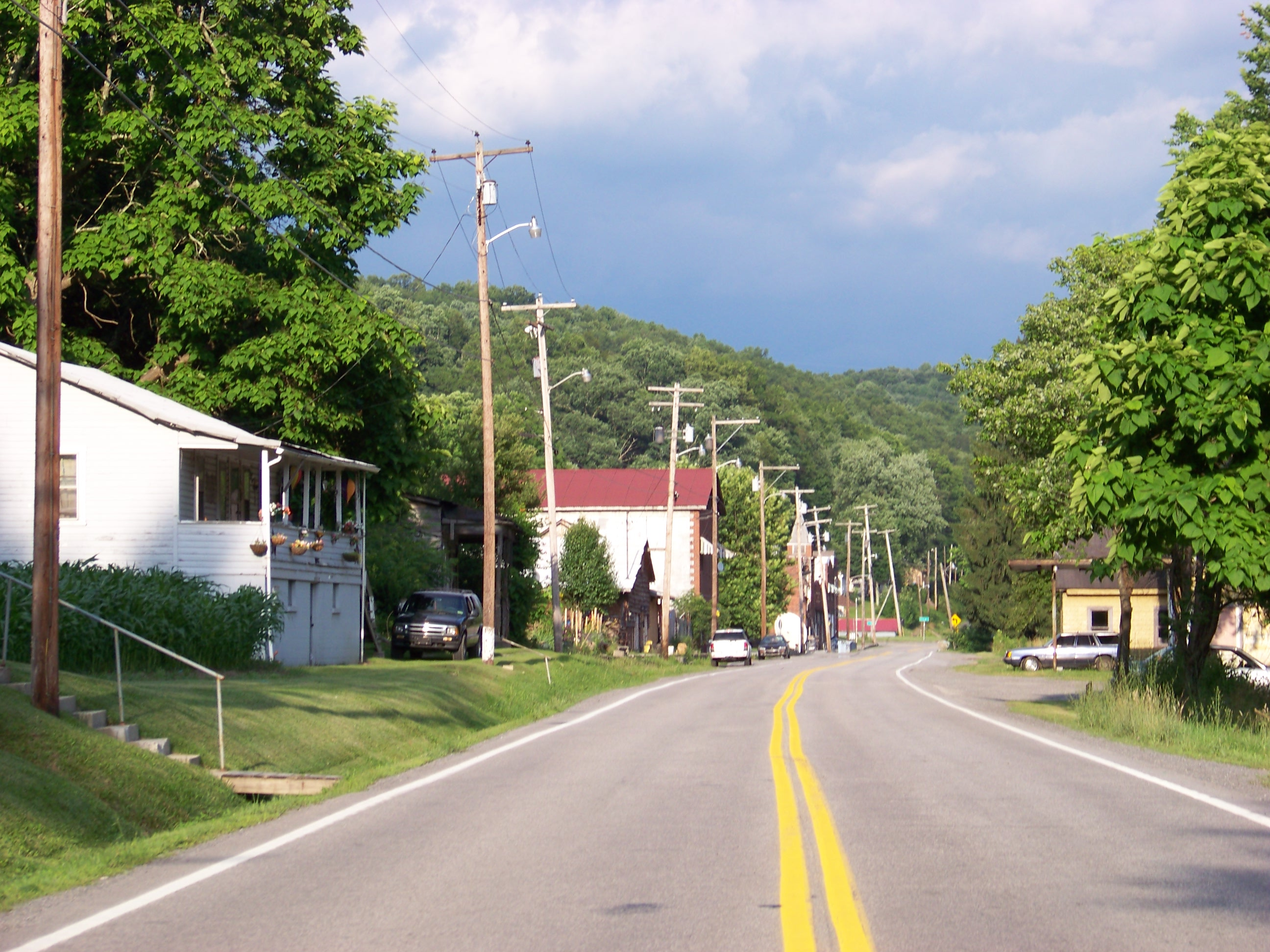
- Central Camden-on-Gauley

- Location of Camden-on-Gauley in Webster County, West Virginia.
- Coordinates: 38°22′8″N 80°35′47″W
- Country: United States
- State: West Virginia
- County: Webster
- Established: 1904

Government
  - Mayor: Lisa Prather

Area
  - Total: 0.33 sq mi (0.86 km^{2})
  - Land: 0.32 sq mi (0.84 km^{2})
  - Water: 0.0077 sq mi (0.02 km^{2})

Population (2020)
  - Total: 126
  - Estimate (2021): 124
  - Density: 446.0/sq mi (172.21/km^{2})
- Time zone: UTC-5 (Eastern (EST))
  - Summer (DST): UTC-4 (EDT)
- ZIP code: 26208
- Area code: 304
- FIPS code: 54-12436
- Website: https://local.wv.gov/CamdenOnGauley/Pages/default.aspx

Camden-on-Gauley is a town in Webster County, West Virginia, United States, along the Gauley River. The population was 126 at the 2020 census.

The town derives its name from Johnson N. Camden, a senator who was the proprietor of several businesses on the nearby Gauley River. The town was originally called Lanes Bottom, but was changed to Camden-on-Gauley when incorporated in 1904.

== Geography ==
Camden-on-Gauley is located at 38°22′8″N 80°35′47″W (38.368782, -80.596459).

According to the United States Census Bureau, the town has a total area of 0.34 square miles (0.88 km^{2}), of which 0.33 square miles (0.85 km^{2}) is land and 0.01 square miles (0.03 km^{2}) is water.

== Demographics ==
Historical population
Census	Pop.	Note	%±
1910	263		—
1920	283		7.6%
1930	435		53.7%
1940	373		−14.3%
1950	373		0.0%
1960	301		−19.3%
1970	243		−19.3%
1980	236		−2.9%
1990	171		−27.5%
2000	157		−8.2%
2010	169		7.6%
2020	126		−25.4%
2021 (est.)	124	▼	−1.6%
U.S. Decennial Census

=== 2010 census ===
As of the census of 2010, there were 169 people, 70 households, and 48 families living in the town. The population density was 512.1 inhabitants per square mile (197.7/km^{2}). There were 87 housing units at an average density of 263.6 per square mile (101.8/km^{2}). The racial makeup of the town was 100.0% White.

There were 70 households, of which 30.0% had children under the age of 18 living with them, 45.7% were married couples living together, 15.7% had a female householder with no husband present, 7.1% had a male householder with no wife present, and 31.4% were non-families. 31.4% of all households were made up of individuals, and 7.1% had someone living alone who was 65 years of age or older. The average household size was 2.41 and the average family size was 2.94.

The median age in the town was 39.5 years. 20.1% of residents were under the age of 18; 8.3% were between the ages of 18 and 24; 32% were from 25 to 44; 24.3% were from 45 to 64; and 15.4% were 65 years of age or older. The gender makeup of the town was 50.3% male and 49.7% female.

=== 2000 census ===
As of the census of 2000, there were 157 people, 60 households, and 45 families living in the town. The population density was 442.0 inhabitants per square mile (168.4/km^{2}). There were 83 housing units at an average density of 233.7 per square mile (89.0/km^{2}). The racial makeup of the town was 99.36% White and 0.64% Native American.

There were 60 households, out of which 33.3% had children under the age of 18 living with them, 55.0% were married couples living together, 15.0% had a female householder with no husband present, and 25.0% were non-families. 21.7% of all households were made up of individuals, and 10.0% had someone living alone who was 65 years of age or older. The average household size was 2.62 and the average family size was 2.96.

In the town, the population was spread out, with 24.2% under the age of 18, 10.2% from 18 to 24, 25.5% from 25 to 44, 24.8% from 45 to 64, and 15.3% who were 65 years of age or older. The median age was 41 years. For every 100 females, there were 96.3 males. For every 100 females age 18 and over, there were 88.9 males.

The median income for a household in the town was $15,417, and the median income for a family was $21,250. Males had a median income of $27,188 versus $15,417 for females. The per capita income for the town was $9,137. About 30.6% of families and 39.2% of the population were below the poverty line, including 55.9% of those under the age of eighteen and 20.0% of those 65 or over.
