= Slaty Fork, West Virginia =

Slatyfork, West Virginia
- Unincorporated community
- Location within West Virginia Location within the United States
- Coordinates: 38°24′59″N 80°07′36″W
- Country: United States
- State: West Virginia
- County: Pocahontas
- Elevation: 2,684 ft (818 m)
- Time zone: UTC-5 (Eastern (EST))
  - Summer (DST): UTC-4 (EDT)
- ZIP code: 26291
- Area codes: 304 & 681
- GNIS feature ID: 1552924

Slatyfork is an unincorporated community in Pocahontas County, West Virginia, United States. Slatyfork is located along U.S. Route 219, 13.5 miles (21.7 km) north of Marlinton.

A variant name was Laurel Bank.

A large cave known as Sharps Cave is located in Slatyfork.
