= Gauley River =

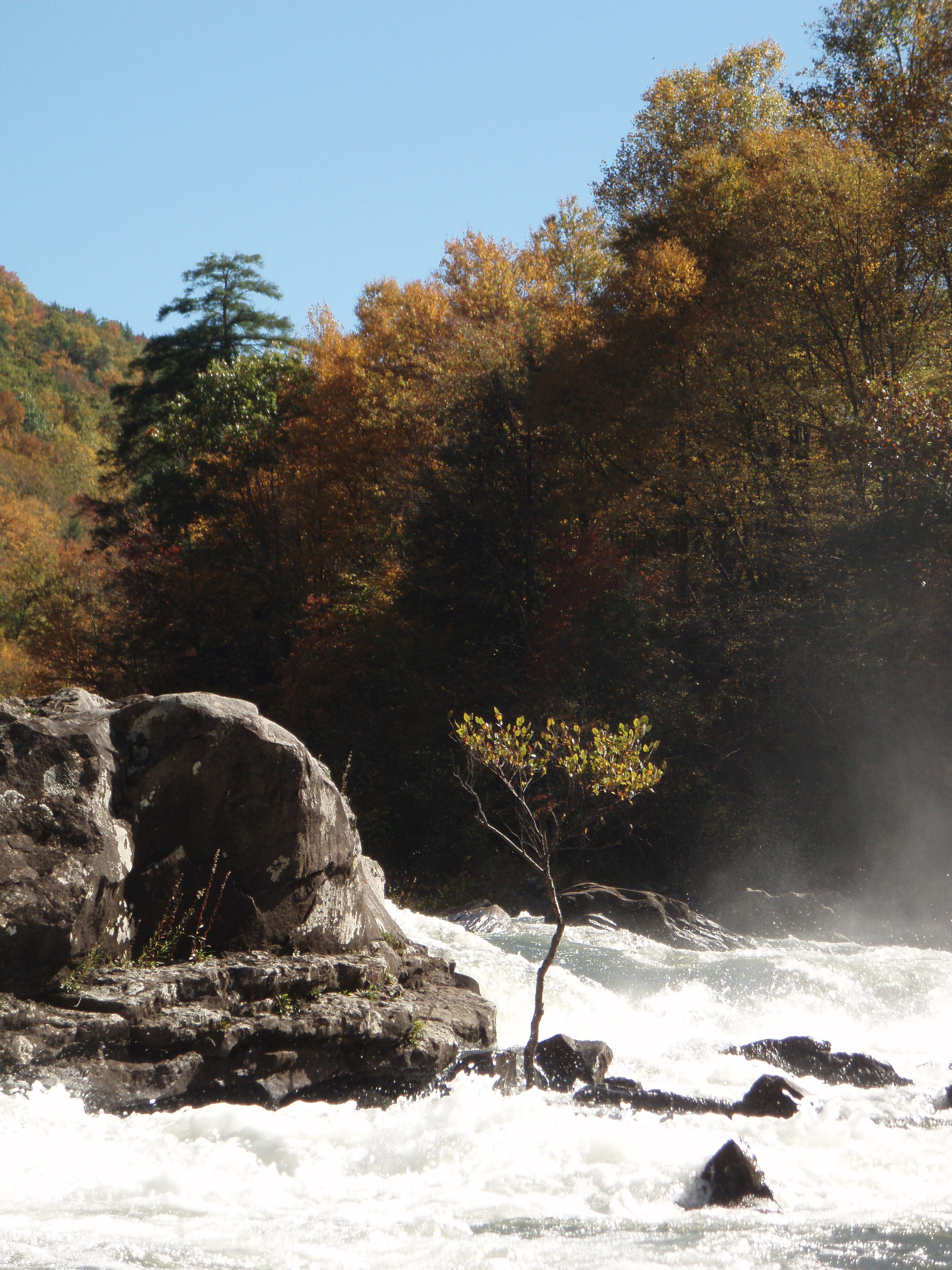
- Sweet's Falls on the Gauley River

Location
- Country: United States
- State: West Virginia
- Counties: Randolph, Webster, Nicholas, Fayette

Physical characteristics
- Source: North Fork Gauley River
  - location: Gauley Mountain, Pocahontas County, WV
  - coordinates: 38°25′42″N 80°10′22″W
  - elevation: 4,000 ft (1,200 m)
- 2nd source: South Fork Gauley River
  - location: Pocahontas County, WV
  - coordinates: 38°22′43″N 80°12′52″W
  - elevation: 3,937 ft (1,200 m)
- 3rd source: Middle Fork Gauley River
  - location: Pocahontas County, WV
  - coordinates: 38°23′21″N 80°11′29″W
  - elevation: 3,844 ft (1,172 m)
- Source confluence: Three Forks of Gauley
  - location: Webster County, WV
  - coordinates: 38°24′33″N 80°14′17″W
  - elevation: 2,917 ft (889 m)
- Mouth: Kanawha River
  - location: Gauley Bridge, WV
  - coordinates: 38°09′42″N 81°11′47″W
  - elevation: 660 ft (200 m)
- Discharge
  - location: Belva, WV
  - average: 2,680 cu ft/s (76 m^{3}/s)
  - minimum: 341 cu ft/s (9.7 m^{3}/s)(1976)
  - maximum: 12,900 cu ft/s (370 m^{3}/s)(1987)

Basin features
- Tributaries
  - left: Miller Mill Run, Williams River, Cranberry River, Meadow River

The Gauley River is a 105-mile-long (169 km) river in the U.S. state of West Virginia. It merges with the New River to form the Kanawha River, a tributary of the Ohio River. The river features numerous recreational whitewater areas, including those in Gauley River National Recreation Area downstream of the Summersville Dam.

== Headwaters and course ==
The Gauley rises in the Monongahela National Forest on Gauley Mountain in Pocahontas County as three streams, the North, Middle, and South Forks, each of which flows across the southern extremity of Randolph County; they converge in Webster County. The river then flows generally west-southwestwardly through Webster, Nicholas and Fayette counties, past the towns of Camden-on-Gauley and Summersville, to the town of Gauley Bridge, where it joins the New River to form the Kanawha River. Via the Kanawha and Ohio rivers, it is part of the Mississippi River watershed.

== Tributaries ==
The Gauley's largest tributaries all flow into the main river from the east (flowing in a westerly direction) and are described as follows:

- The Williams River drains a segment of the Monongahela National Forest, joining the Gauley in Webster County.
- The Cranberry River flows through the Monongahela National Forest and empties into the Gauley in Nicholas County.
- The Cherry River, which initially flows through the town of Richwood, joins the Gauley near Craigsville.
- The Meadow River, which initially flows through the town of Rainelle, joins the Gauley at the Fayette-Nicholas County border.

== Dams ==
In Nicholas County, the Gauley is impounded by the Summersville Dam, a U.S. Army Corps of Engineers dam, to form Summersville Lake. The Gauley River National Recreation Area is downstream of the dam.

== Whitewater paddling ==
The Gauley is run year-round by recreational whitewater rafters and from spring to fall by commercial rafting companies. During the majority of the year, boating is dependent on water level, which fluctuates dramatically depending on rainfall and the level of Summersville Lake. However, starting the Friday after Labor Day, the Army Corps of Engineers provides a series of 22 controlled releases for the express purpose of downriver recreation. These releases are collectively known as "Gauley Season" and are scheduled on six successive weekends, the first five of which are four-day weekends (Friday through Monday) and the last of which is just Saturday and Sunday. Typical release levels during "Gauley Season" range from 2,400 to 2,800 ft³/s (68 to 79 m³/s).

These releases are the result of an act of the U.S. Congress, the first law passed in the U.S. to specifically mandate recreational whitewater dam releases. The releases bring millions of dollars annually to the local economy, as paddlers travel from all over the United States and overseas for this event.

== History ==
The Gauley area was the site of the Battle of Carnifex Ferry on September 10, 1861, a Union victory in the American Civil War.

== Name ==
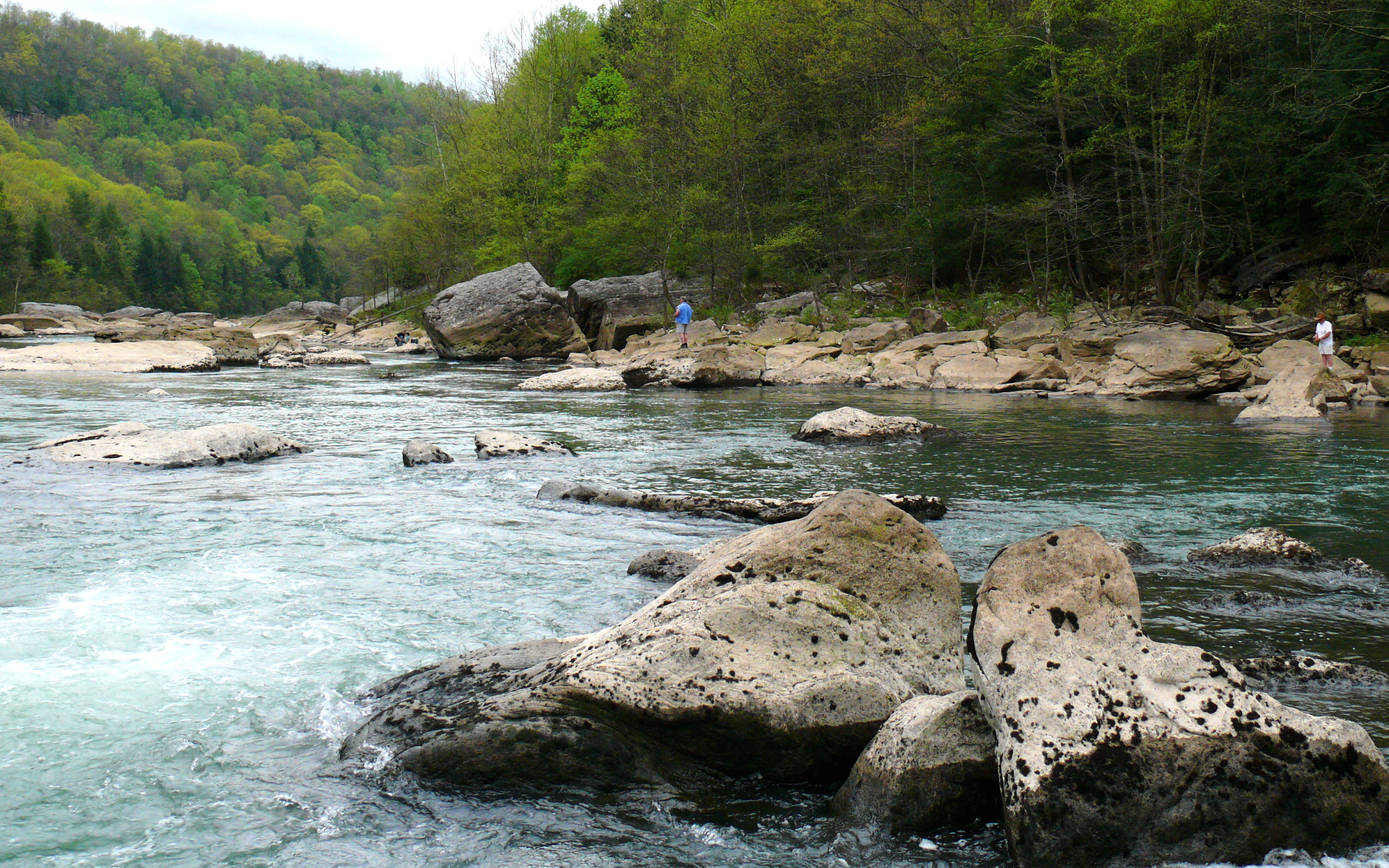
Anglers fish for rainbow and brown trout on the Gauley River.

The Gauley River's name most likely is derived from Gaul (literally "river of the Gauls"), a historical region of Europe including most of current day France, from the time when West Virginia was part of New France before the French and Indian War. Historically, the river has had various Indian names, variant spellings of Gaul/Gauley as well as Falling/Falls Creek.

== See also ==
- List of West Virginia rivers
