= Webster Springs, West Virginia =

- Town
- Addison, West Virginia
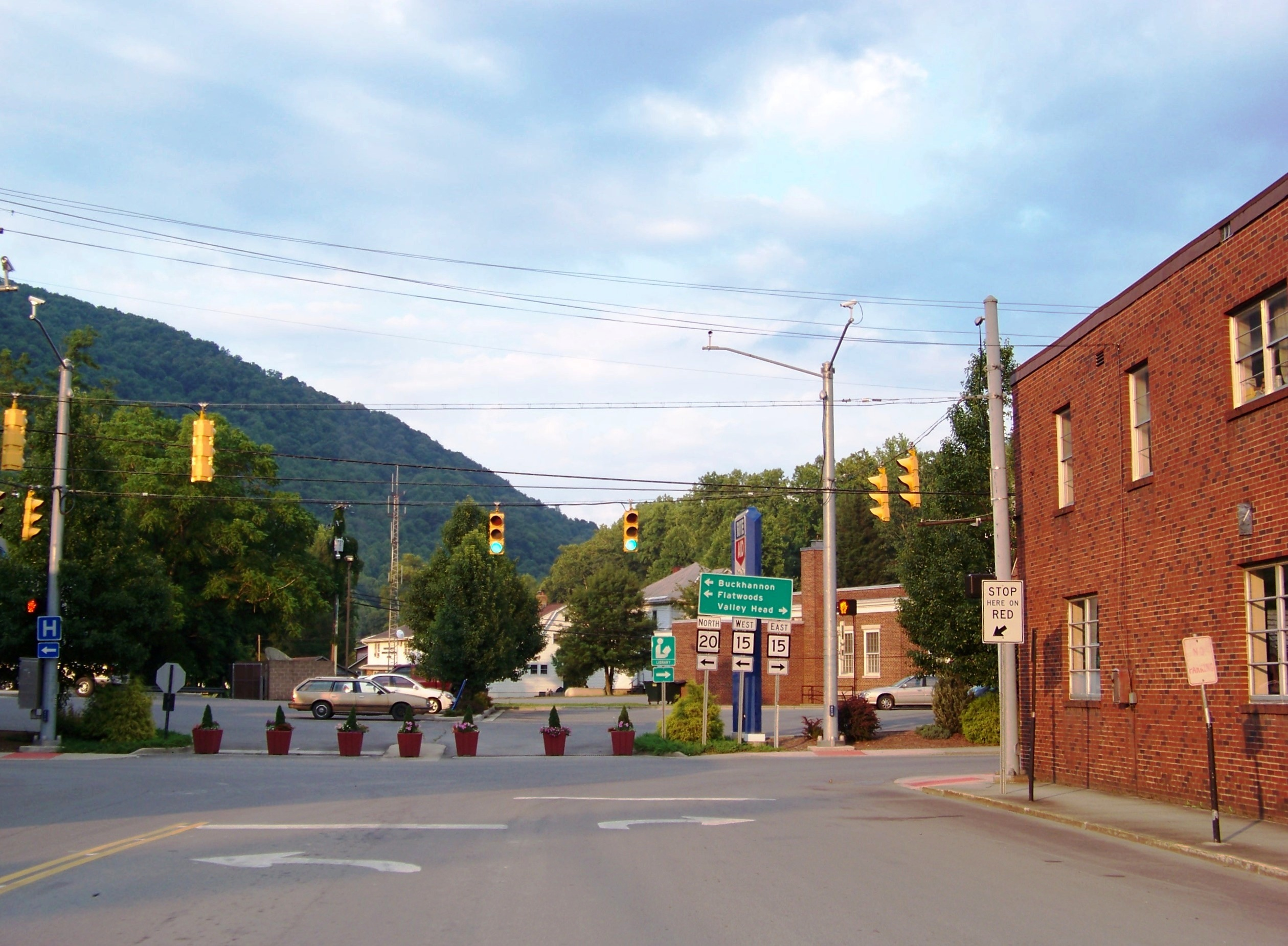
- Webster Springs in January 2007
- Interactive map of Webster Springs, West Virginia
- Location within West Virginia Location within the United States
- Coordinates: 38°28′34″N 80°24′36″W
- Country: United States
- State: West Virginia
- County: Webster
- Settled as: Fort Lick in 1899
- Incorporated as (town): Addison in 1945
- Named for: Addison McLaughlin

Government
  - Mayor: Don E. McCourt

Area
  - Total: 0.47 sq mi (1.23 km^{2})
  - Land: 0.45 sq mi (1.17 km^{2})
  - Water: 0.023 sq mi (0.06 km^{2})
- Elevation: 1,460 ft (445 m)

Population (2020)
  - Total: 731
  - Estimate (2021): 715
  - Density: 1,471.5/sq mi (568.16/km^{2})
- Time zone: UTC-5 (Eastern (EST))
  - Summer (DST): UTC-4 (EDT)
- ZIP Code: 26288
- Area codes: 304 and 681
- FIPS code: 54101
- GNIS feature ID: 1560603
- Website: Addison Official Website

Addison, commonly known as Webster Springs, is a town in Webster County, West Virginia, United States, and its county seat. Although it was incorporated as Addison in 1892, it is more frequently referred to as Webster Springs, the name of the town's post office. The population was 731 at the 2020 census.

The town was named for Addison McLaughlin, upon whose land the town was originally laid out. It was famous in the late 19th and early 20th centuries for its numerous salt sulfur water wells. People believed that the water from the wells had medicinal qualities.

Webster Springs sits at the confluence of the Elk River and its Back Fork. The town has numerous shops, retail stores, grocery stores, pharmacies, a motel, and several restaurants. Government offices for the municipality, county, and state are available in the town. The town is served by the Addison Public Library and fire service is provided by the Webster Springs Volunteer Fire Department.

== Etymology ==
The name of the town is officially "Addison", but the community is most often referred to by the name of its post office, "Webster Springs". It is also labeled on some maps as "Addison", and some as "Webster Springs". The unofficial name has gone so far that the county commission's letterhead reads "Webster Springs," rather than "Addison", which it had previously.

Other names for the town have included Elk Lick and Fork Lick.

== History ==
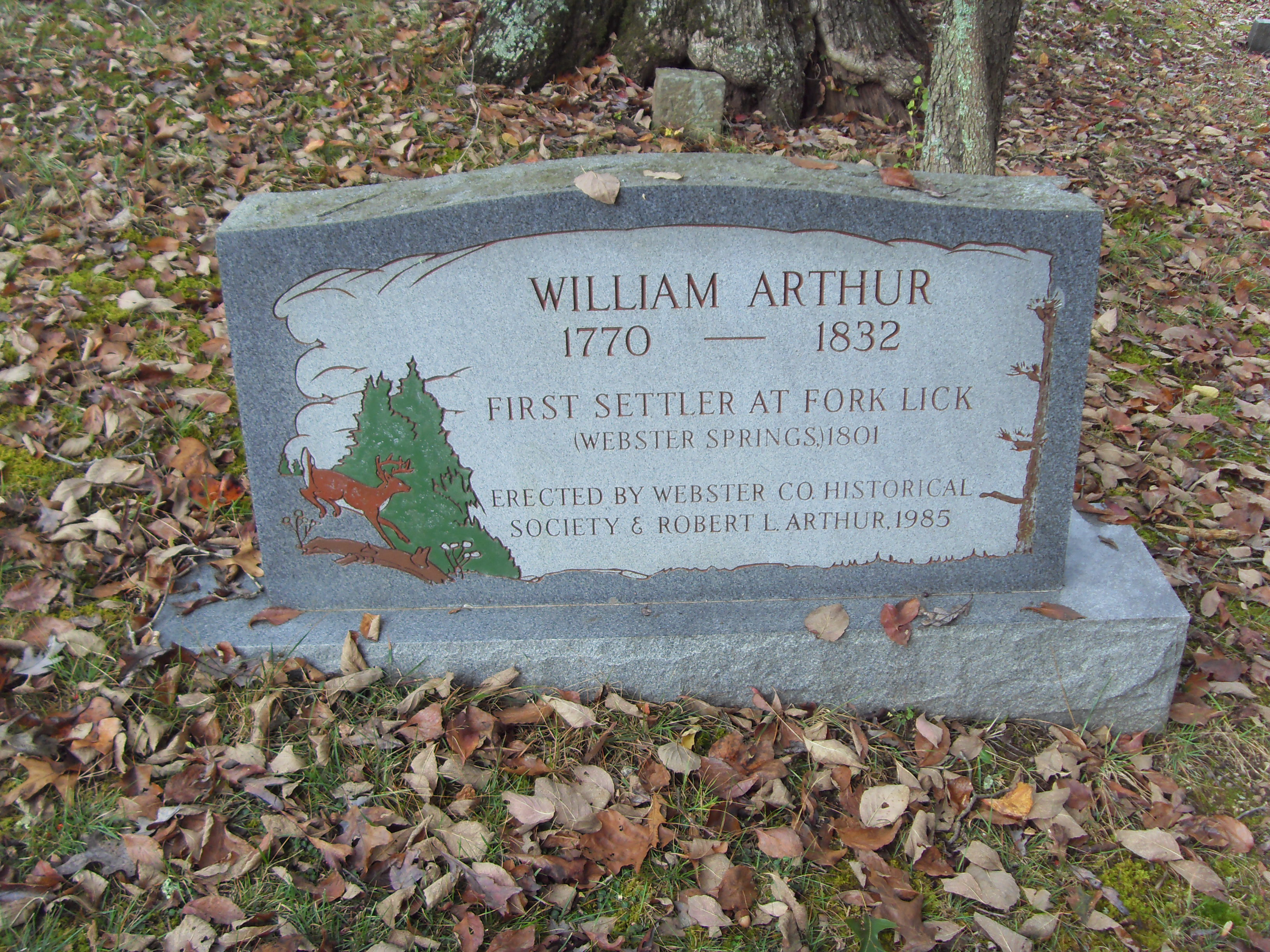
Tombstone near the burial site of William Arthur, honoring him as a founder of Fort Lick (now Webster Springs)

The town's first permanent settlers were named William and Polly (maiden name, "Friend") Arthur, who arrived in 1860. The first post office established in Webster County was Fort Lick, present-day Webster Springs. The postmaster at the time was a man by the name of John Hall. It is also the county seat of Webster County

The Morton House was listed on the National Register of Historic Places in 1986.

=== Salt sulfur wells ===
Hall, along with a man whose first name is not known, who is only known as Mr. Skidmore, drilled the first salt sulfur well in the county, it was known as "Old Spring." The well was later owned by Colonel John T. McGraw. The salt sulfur well helped make Webster Springs a popular summer tourist location during the 19th and early 20th Century.

According to Springs in West Virginia, Webster Springs had a total of four springs: the Addison McLaughlin Well, located to the west of Court Square on the present site of the Mineral Springs Motel; Old Fork Lick Spring, located in the bed of the Elk River; Tracy Well, located on the lot of its owner, W.B. Tracy, in Webster Springs; and the William Smith Well, located in Dorrtown. The wells were popular because people believed that the water from the wells had medicinal qualities. The water was used to treat skin conditions such as psoriasis, eczema, acne and arthritis.

=== Webster Springs Hotel ===
In 1897, Senator Johnson Newlon Camden built the Webster Springs Hotel, a 265-room hotel of Victorian style architecture. It was larger than The Greenbrier Hotel, built in 1913 in White Sulfur Springs, which only has 250 rooms. The hotel contained a tennis court, horse stables, garden, bowling alley, power plant, and Russian and Victorian Turkish baths, where visitors could enjoy the "medicinal" qualities of its salt sulfur waters. The hotel was also the largest wood-frame hotel in West Virginia.

When first built, the hotel was a three-story dark colored building. After it was completed, construction began on a new, much larger section of the hotel, adding more rooms, and a new exterior color, white. The new section of the hotel contained up-to-date Turkish bath equipment, where guests could have a sulfur water bath. For many years, filled to capacity by guests and a greatly increased overflow which necessitated the building of smaller hotels in the town. The hotel also raised its own cattle and provided some of its own food and milk. The hotel's ice house, according to Elizah Hedding Gillespie, His Ancestors, Descendants and Their Families, was capable of holding 150 tons of ice. The hotel was heated by steam.

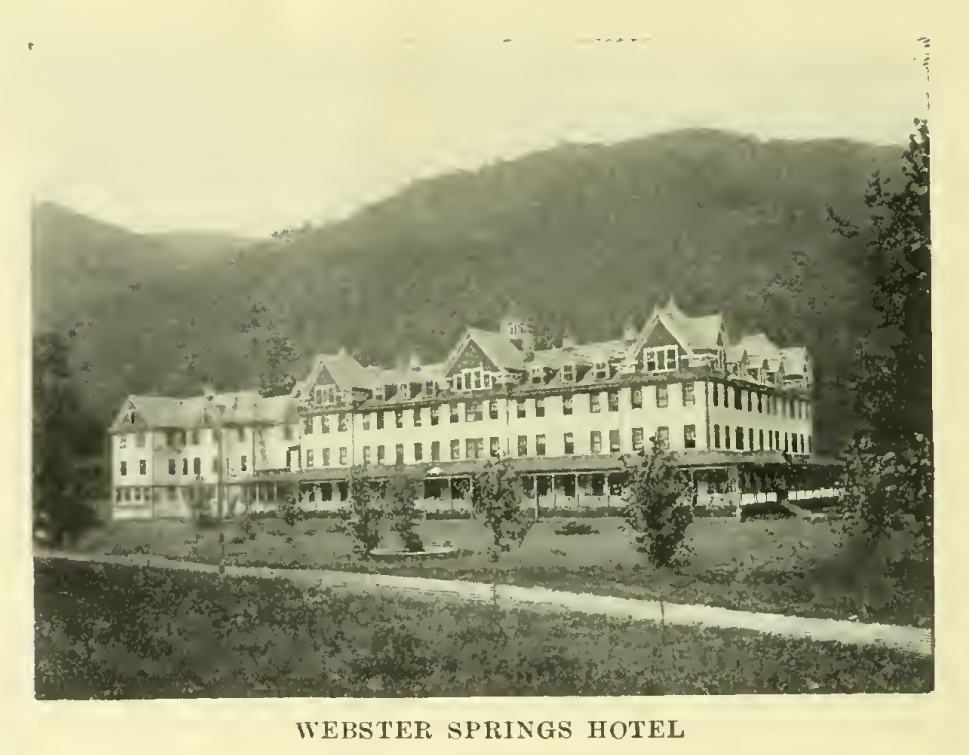
Webster Springs Hotel, circa 1909

In 1903, Colonel McGraw purchased the hotel and expanded it by 115 rooms, completed in the spring of 1904. Of the 89 "non-guest" rooms in the new section, 40 were for salt sulfur baths, which took up the entire first floor of one wing. The entire southern wing of the hotel was given to bath rooms, including; "the plunge," Turkish, Russian, Needle, Shower, and Steam baths. Of which they were offered in both fresh and salt-sulfur water.

On the interior, it contained stuffed bears, elks, and other wildlife of the local county in realistic poses.

At the height of its popularity, the hotel played host to such guests as Senators Thomas Kearns (Utah), Henry G. Davis (West Virginia), his son-in-law, Stephen Benton Elkins (West Virginia), and Camden himself.

On the night of July 20, 1925, the hotel caught fire and was burned to the ground, being completely destroyed. Flames could be seen as far as one mile away, as well, the sky was seen as a bright red color, up to 19 miles away, in Camden-on-Gauley.

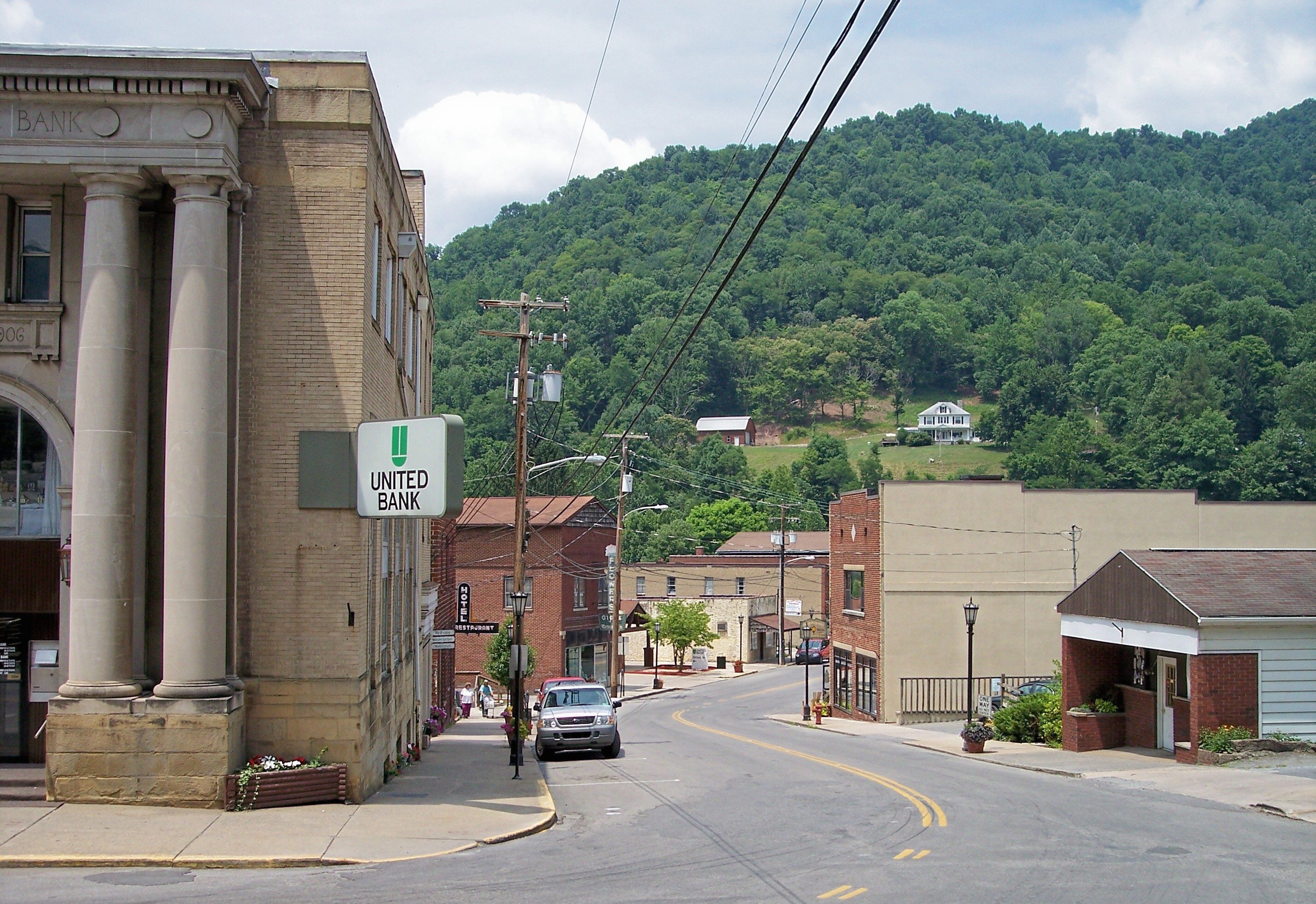
Main Street (West Virginia Route 15) in Webster Springs in 2007, from Court Square

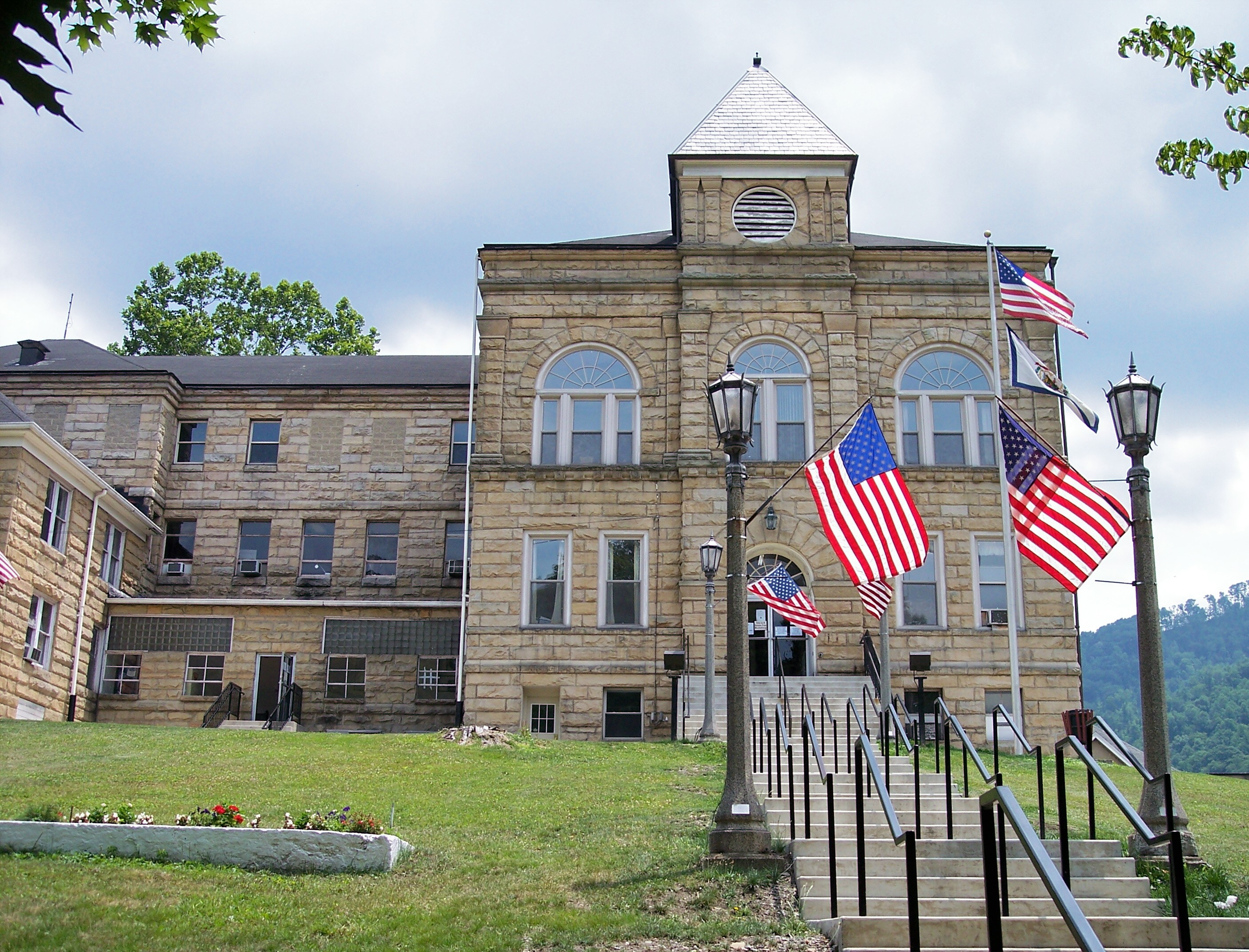
Front of the Webster County Courthouse in 2007

== Geography ==
Webster Springs is located at 38°28′34″N 80°24′36″W (38.476192, -80.410025), along the Elk River. According to the United States Census Bureau, the town has a total area of 0.47 square miles (1.22 km^{2}), of which 0.45 square miles (1.17 km^{2}) is land and 0.02 square miles (0.05 km^{2}) is water. It lies at an elevation of 1,460 ft. (445m) and is close to Buffalo Bull Knob, elevation 2,799 ft.

=== Climate ===
The climate in this area has mild differences between highs and lows, and there is adequate rainfall year-round. According to the Köppen Climate Classification system, Webster Springs has a marine west coast climate, abbreviated "Cfb" on climate maps.

== Demographics ==
Historical population
Census	Pop.	Note	%±
1880	120		—
1900	297		—
1910	500		68.4%
1920	679		35.8%
1930	976		43.7%
1940	1,133		16.1%
1950	1,313		15.9%
1960	1,132		−13.8%
1970	1,038		−8.3%
1980	939		−9.5%
1990	674		−28.2%
2000	808		19.9%
2010	776		−4.0%
2020	731		−5.8%
2021 (est.)	715	▼	−2.2%
U.S. Decennial Census

=== 2020 census ===
As of the 2020 census, there were 731 people and 436 households residing in the city. There were 415 housing units in Webster Springs. The racial makeup of the city was 97.2% White, 0.3% African American, 0.1% Native American, 0.3% from other races, and 2% from two or more races. Hispanics or Latinos of any race were 0.5% of the population.

There were 436 households, of which 47.2% were married couples living together, 35.6% had a female householder with no spouse present, 14% had a male householder with no spouse present.The average household and family size was 4.16. The median age in the city was 34.2 years.

=== 2010 census ===
As of the census of 2010, there were 776 people, 363 households, and 211 families living in the town. The population density was 1,724.4 inhabitants per square mile (665.8/km^{2}). There were 447 housing units at an average density of 993.3 per square mile (383.5/km^{2}). The racial makeup of the town was 99.2% White, 0.1% African American, 0.1% Native American, and 0.5% from two or more races. Hispanic or Latino of any race were 0.3% of the population.

Of the 363 households, 27.0% had children under the age of 18 living with them, 40.8% were married couples living together, 13.2% had a female householder with no husband present, 4.1% had a male householder with no wife present, and 41.9% were non-families. 36.9% of all households were made up of individuals, and 14% had someone living alone who was 65 years of age or older. The average household size was 2.14 and the average family size was 2.77.

The median age in the town was 45.3 years. 20.6% of residents were under the age of 18; 7.1% were between the ages of 18 and 24; 22.3% were from 25 to 44; 32% were from 45 to 64; and 18% were 65 years of age or older. The gender makeup of the town was 47.8% male and 52.2% female.

=== 2000 census ===
As of the census of 2000, there were 808 people, 403 households, and 222 families living in the town. The population density was 1,729.9 inhabitants per square mile (663.8/km^{2}). There were 463 housing units at an average density of 991.3 per square mile (380.4/km^{2}). The racial makeup of the town was 99.75% White, 0.12% Native American, and 0.12% from two or more races. Hispanic or Latino of any race were 0.50% of the population.

There were 403 households, out of which 22.1% had children under the age of 18 living with them, 40.9% were married couples living together, 12.7% had a female householder with no husband present, and 44.7% were non-families. 42.2% of all households were made up of individuals, and 20.8% had someone living alone who was 65 years of age or older. The average household size was 2.00 and the average family size was 2.70.

In the town, the population was spread out, with 19.9% under the age of 18, 7.4% from 18 to 24, 24.4% from 25 to 44, 27.7% from 45 to 64, and 20.5% who were 65 years of age or older. The median age was 44 years. For every 100 females, there were 80.8 males. For every 100 females age 18 and over, there were 76.8 males.

The median income for a household in the town was $20,592, and the median income for a family was $27,434. Males had a median income of $27,386 versus $16,389 for females. The per capita income for the town was $13,500. About 22.0% of families and 28.1% of the population were below the poverty line, including 35.2% of those under age 18 and 21.9% of those age 65 or over.

== Notable people ==
- Joe Talbott, Delegate for the 36th District
- Forest Dewey Dodrill, pioneering heart surgeon
- Walt Helmick, West Virginia Commissioner of Agriculture.

== See also ==
- Webster Sycamore
