= Webster County, West Virginia =

County in West Virginia, United States

- County
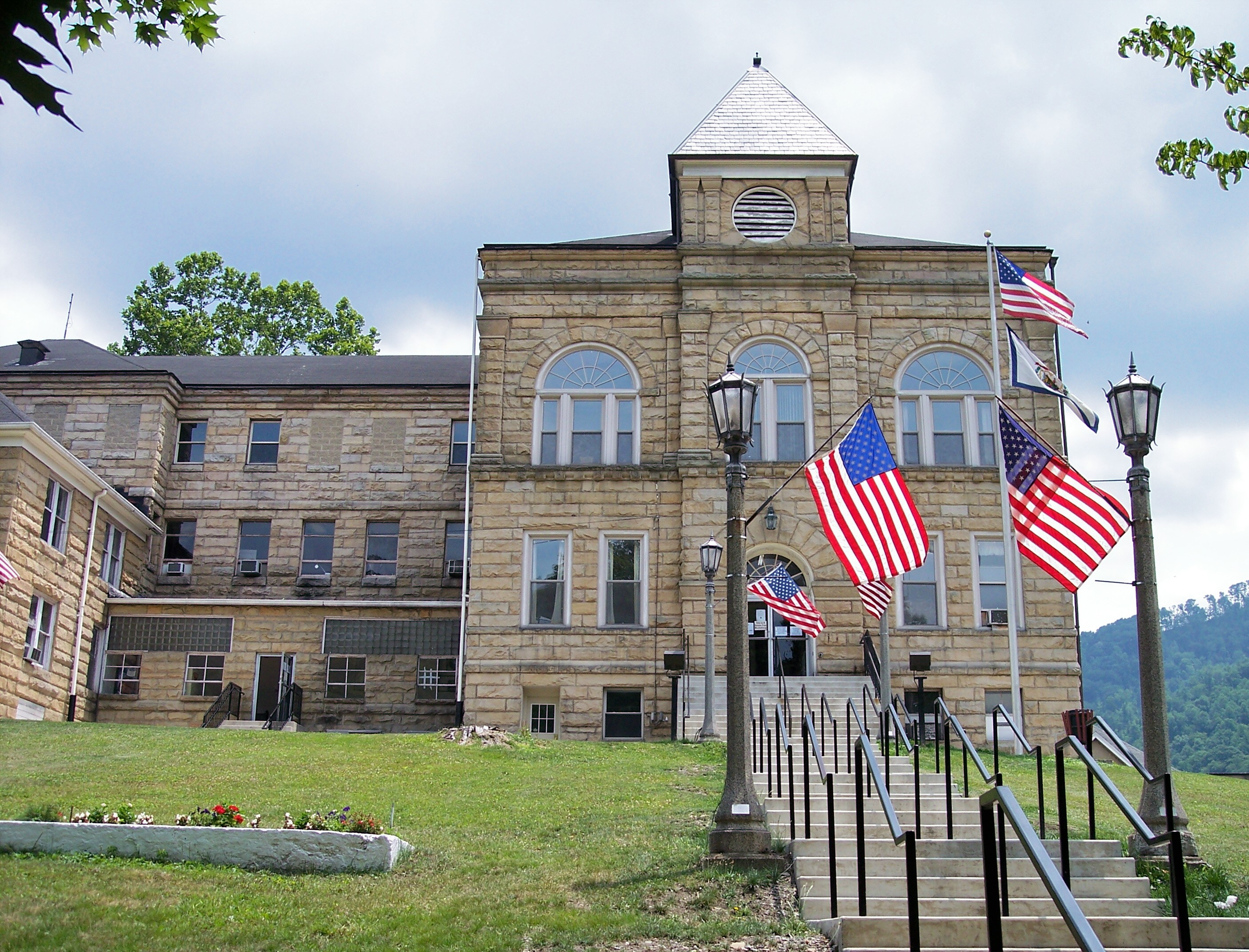
- Webster County Courthouse in Webster Springs, 2007

- Location within the U.S. state of West Virginia
- Coordinates: 38°29′N 80°26′W
- Country: United States
- State: West Virginia
- Founded: January 10, 1860
- Named for: Daniel Webster
- Seat: Webster Springs
- Largest town: Webster Springs

Area
  - Total: 556 sq mi (1,440 km^{2})
  - Land: 553 sq mi (1,430 km^{2})
  - Water: 2.8 sq mi (7.3 km^{2}) 0.5%

Population (2020)
  - Total: 8,378
  - Estimate (2025): 7,760 ▼
  - Density: 15.2/sq mi (5.85/km^{2})
- Time zone: UTC−5 (Eastern)
  - Summer (DST): UTC−4 (EDT)
- Congressional district: 1st
- Website: www.webstercountywv.com

Webster County is a county in the U.S. state of West Virginia. As of the 2020 census, the population was 8,378. Its county seat is Webster Springs. The county was founded in 1860 and named for Daniel Webster.

== History ==
Webster County was formed from parts of Nicholas, Braxton, and Randolph counties in Virginia through the approval of an act of the Virginia General Assembly during its 1859-1860 session. Movement toward the formation of this county began in 1851.

Webster became part of West Virginia on June 20, 1863. When the state was formed, each county was divided into multiple civil townships, with the intention of encouraging local government. This proved impractical in the heavily rural state, so in 1872 the townships were converted into magisterial districts.

Webster County's three original townships, subsequently magisterial districts, were Fork Lick, Glade, and Holly. A fourth district, Hacker Valley, (Note: Originally "Hacker's Valley".) was formed from part of Holly District in 1876. The four historic magisterial districts remained largely unchanged until the 1990s, when they were consolidated into three new districts: Central, Northern, and Southern.

== Geography ==
According to the United States Census Bureau, the county has a total area of 556 square miles (1,440 km^{2}), of which 553 square miles (1,430 km^{2}) is land and 2.8 square miles (7.3 km^{2}) (0.5%) is water.

=== Major highways ===
- West Virginia Route 15
- West Virginia Route 20
- West Virginia Route 82

=== Adjacent counties ===
- Lewis County (north)
- Upshur County (north)
- Randolph County (east)
- Pocahontas County (southeast)
- Greenbrier County (south)
- Nicholas County (southwest)
- Braxton County (west)

=== National protected area ===
- Monongahela National Forest (part)

=== Streams ===
- Cougar Fork

== Demographics ==
Historical population
Census	Pop.	Note	%±
1860	1,555		—
1870	1,730		11.3%
1880	3,207		85.4%
1890	4,783		49.1%
1900	8,862		85.3%
1910	9,680		9.2%
1920	11,562		19.4%
1930	14,216		23.0%
1940	18,080		27.2%
1950	17,888		−1.1%
1960	13,719		−23.3%
1970	9,809		−28.5%
1980	12,245		24.8%
1990	10,729		−12.4%
2000	9,719		−9.4%
2010	9,154		−5.8%
2020	8,378		−8.5%
2025 (est.)	7,760	▼	−7.4%
U.S. Decennial Census; 1790–1960 1900–1990; 1990–2000 2010–2020

=== 2020 census ===
As of the 2020 census, the county had a population of 8,378. Of the residents, 19.9% were under the age of 18 and 24.5% were 65 years of age or older; the median age was 48.3 years. For every 100 females there were 100.5 males, and for every 100 females age 18 and over there were 98.8 males.

The racial makeup of the county was 96.7% White, 0.2% Black or African American, 0.2% American Indian and Alaska Native, none Asian, 0.2% from some other race, and 2.6% from two or more races. Hispanic or Latino residents of any race comprised 0.6% of the population.

There were 3,598 households in the county, of which 25.2% had children under the age of 18 living with them and 26.3% had a female householder with no spouse or partner present. About 31.6% of all households were made up of individuals and 15.7% had someone living alone who was 65 years of age or older.

There were 4,381 housing units, of which 17.9% were vacant. Among occupied housing units, 78.3% were owner-occupied and 21.7% were renter-occupied. The homeowner vacancy rate was 1.7% and the rental vacancy rate was 8.9%.

The median income for a household in the county was $42,106 and the poverty rate was 19.6%.

Webster County, West Virginia – Racial and ethnic composition Note: the US Census treats Hispanic/Latino as an ethnic category. This table excludes Latinos from the racial categories and assigns them to a separate category. Hispanics/Latinos may be of any race.
Race / Ethnicity (NH = Non-Hispanic)	Pop 2000	Pop 2010	Pop 2020	% 2000	% 2010	% 2020
White alone (NH)	9,605	8,989	8,086	98.83%	98.20%	96.51%
Black or African American alone (NH)	1	14	10	0.01%	0.15%	0.12%
Native American or Alaska Native alone (NH)	7	6	14	0.07%	0.07%	0.17%
Asian alone (NH)	6	5	4	0.06%	0.05%	0.05%
Pacific Islander alone (NH)	1	1	2	0.01%	0.01%	0.02%
Other race alone (NH)	1	1	7	0.01%	0.01%	0.08%
Mixed race or Multiracial (NH)	62	90	205	0.64%	0.98%	2.45%
Hispanic or Latino (any race)	36	48	50	0.37%	0.52%	0.60%
Total	9,719	9,154	8,378	100.00%	100.00%	100.00%

=== 2010 census ===
As of the 2010 United States census, there were 9,154 people, 3,792 households, and 2,595 families living in the county. The population density was 16.5 inhabitants per square mile (6.4/km^{2}). There were 5,428 housing units at an average density of 9.8 units per square mile (3.8 units/km^{2}). The racial makeup of the county was 98.6% white, 0.2% black or African American, 0.1% Asian, 0.1% American Indian, 0.1% from other races, and 1.0% from two or more races. Those of Hispanic or Latino origin made up 0.5% of the population. In terms of ancestry, 19.8% were American, 15.7% were Irish, 12.6% were German, and 8.9% were English.

Of the 3,792 households, 30.1% had children under the age of 18 living with them, 51.8% were married couples living together, 11.2% had a female householder with no husband present, 31.6% were non-families, and 26.5% of all households were made up of individuals. The average household size was 2.40 and the average family size was 2.88. The median age was 44.1 years.

The median income for a household in the county was $28,025 and the median income for a family was $35,448. Males had a median income of $44,277 versus $19,292 for females. The per capita income for the county was $17,268. About 19.9% of families and 22.9% of the population were below the poverty line, including 26.4% of those under age 18 and 12.1% of those age 65 or over.

=== 2000 census ===
As of the census of 2000, there were 9,719 people, 4,010 households, and 2,815 families living in the county. The population density was 18 people per square mile (6.9 people/km^{2}). There were 5,273 housing units at an average density of 10 units per square mile (3.9 units/km^{2}). The racial makeup of the county was 99.18% White, 0.01% Black or African American, 0.07% Native American, 0.06% Asian, 0.01% Pacific Islander, 0.01% from other races, and 0.66% from two or more races. 0.37% of the population were Hispanic or Latino of any race.

There were 4,010 households, out of which 29.80% had children under the age of 18 living with them, 55.40% were married couples living together, 10.60% had a female householder with no husband present, and 29.80% were non-families. 26.50% of all households were made up of individuals, and 12.40% had someone living alone who was 65 years of age or older. The average household size was 2.41 and the average family size was 2.89.

In the county, the population was spread out, with 23.00% under the age of 18, 8.00% from 18 to 24, 26.70% from 25 to 44, 27.10% from 45 to 64, and 15.20% who were 65 years of age or older. The median age was 40 years. For every 100 females there were 96.90 males. For every 100 females age 18 and over, there were 94.30 males.

The median income for a household in the county was $21,055, and the median income for a family was $25,049. Males had a median income of $25,362 versus $15,381 for females. The per capita income for the county was $12,284. About 26.60% of families and 31.80% of the population were below the poverty line, including 45.40% of those under age 18 and 21.00% of those age 65 or over.

== Politics ==
From 1864 through 2008, Webster County voted Democratic in every presidential election except 1972, when Richard Nixon carried the county by just 45 votes against George McGovern. However, in 2012 Mitt Romney carried the county handily, by a 27.52% margin. In 2016, Donald Trump won the county by a 57.90% margin, in 2020 by a 63.2% margin, and in 2024 by a 66.7% margin. Each of these margins, in succession, were the largest of any candidate in the county's history.

United States presidential election results for Webster County, West Virginia
Year	Republican		Democratic		Third party(ies)	
Year	No.	%	No.	%	No.	%
1912	307	14.06%	1,330	60.90%	547	25.05%
1916	854	35.87%	1,513	63.54%	14	0.59%
1920	1,562	44.51%	1,942	55.34%	5	0.14%
1924	1,617	38.68%	2,523	60.36%	40	0.96%
1928	1,936	45.53%	2,306	54.23%	10	0.24%
1932	1,781	32.53%	3,664	66.92%	30	0.55%
1936	1,987	30.02%	4,613	69.70%	18	0.27%
1940	2,067	31.10%	4,579	68.90%	0	0.00%
1944	1,595	32.68%	3,285	67.32%	0	0.00%
1948	1,527	28.99%	3,726	70.74%	14	0.27%
1952	2,229	37.17%	3,767	62.83%	0	0.00%
1956	2,457	44.44%	3,072	55.56%	0	0.00%
1960	1,689	32.68%	3,479	67.32%	0	0.00%
1964	936	19.95%	3,755	80.05%	0	0.00%
1968	1,241	30.22%	2,582	62.87%	284	6.92%
1972	2,114	50.54%	2,069	49.46%	0	0.00%
1976	971	24.88%	2,931	75.12%	0	0.00%
1980	1,262	31.76%	2,578	64.87%	134	3.37%
1984	1,565	39.86%	2,355	59.98%	6	0.15%
1988	1,016	31.58%	2,185	67.92%	16	0.50%
1992	811	22.68%	2,320	64.88%	445	12.44%
1996	654	19.63%	2,292	68.81%	385	11.56%
2000	1,484	44.86%	1,764	53.33%	60	1.81%
2004	1,724	46.42%	1,965	52.91%	25	0.67%
2008	1,386	45.34%	1,552	50.77%	119	3.89%
2012	1,710	61.67%	947	34.15%	116	4.18%
2016	2,302	76.45%	556	18.47%	153	5.08%
2020	2,759	81.10%	610	17.93%	33	0.97%
2024	2,478	82.66%	479	15.98%	41	1.37%

== Communities ==
=== Towns ===
- Camden-on-Gauley
- Cowen
- Webster Springs (county seat; legally Town of Addison)

=== Magisterial districts ===
==== Current ====
- Central
- Northern
- Southern

==== Historic ====
- Fork Lick
- Glade
- Hacker Valley
- Holly

=== Census-designated places ===
- Bergoo
- Parcoal

=== Unincorporated communities ===
- Big Run
- Boggs
- Bolair
- Cherry Falls
- Cleveland
- Curtin
- Diana
- Donaldson
- Dyer
- Erbacon
- Excelsior
- Gauley Mills
- Guardian
- Hacker Valley
- Halo
- Hodam
- Jumbo
- Replete
- Upperglade
- Wheeler

== Notable person ==
- Josh Stewart, actor

== See also ==
- Webster County Schools
- Big Ditch Wildlife Management Area
- Holly River State Park
- National Register of Historic Places listings in Webster County, West Virginia
- Mountain Parkway Byway and Backway
