= National Register of Historic Places listings in Webster County, West Virginia =

Location of Webster County in West Virginia

This is a list of the National Register of Historic Places listings in Webster County, West Virginia.

This is intended to be a complete list of the properties and districts on the National Register of Historic Places in Webster County, West Virginia, United States. The locations of National Register properties and districts for which the latitude and longitude coordinates are included below, may be seen in a Google map.

There are 7 properties listed on the National Register in the county.

This National Park Service list is complete through NPS recent listings posted December 12, 2025.

Contents: Counties in West Virginia

Barbour - Berkeley - Boone - Braxton - Brooke - Cabell - Calhoun - Clay - Doddridge - Fayette - Gilmer - Grant - Greenbrier - Hampshire - Hancock - Hardy - Harrison - Jackson - Jefferson - Kanawha - Lewis - Lincoln - Logan - Marion - Marshall - Mason - McDowell - Mercer - Mineral - Mingo - Monongalia - Monroe - Morgan - Nicholas - Ohio - Pendleton - Pleasants - Pocahontas - Preston - Putnam - Raleigh - Randolph - Ritchie - Roane - Summers - Taylor - Tucker - Tyler - Upshur - Wayne - Webster - Wetzel - Wirt - Wood - Wyoming

== Current listings ==
	Name on the Register	Image	Date listed	Location	City or town	Description
1	Camp Caesar	Camp Caesar	December 30, 2009 (#09001197)	4868 Webster Rd. 38°24′02″N 80°29′20″W	Cowen	
2	Craig Run East Fork Rockshelter		June 3, 1993 (#93000493)	Address Restricted	Dyer	
3	Laurel Run Rockshelter		June 3, 1993 (#93000491)	Address Restricted	Coe	
4	Lowther Store	Lowther Store	April 7, 1997 (#97000264)	1793 Replete Road; 38°41′09″N 80°23′31″W	Wheeler	
5	Mollohan Mill	Mollohan Mill	September 2, 1982 (#82004331)	On County Route 8; 38°40′55″N 80°28′16″W	Replete	
6	Morton House	Morton House	April 15, 1986 (#86000795)	Union St. 38°28′34″N 80°24′33″W	Webster Springs	A Queen Anne style house known locally as Morton Mansion
7	New Deal Resources in Holly River State Park Historic District	New Deal Resources in Holly River State Park Historic District	February 4, 2011 (#10001228)	WV 20 (32 miles south of US 33); 38°39′58″N 80°21′37″W	Hacker Valley	

== See also ==
- List of National Historic Landmarks in West Virginia
- National Register of Historic Places listings in West Virginia
