= COE =

COE or Coe may refer to:

== Organizations ==
- Center of excellence
- NATO Centres of Excellence
- Chamber Orchestra of Europe, based in London, England
- Church of Euthanasia, an American religious organization
- Comandos e Operações Especiais, a police tactical unit of the São Paulo State Military Police
- Council of Europe, an international organization
- Council on Occupational Education, in the U.S.
- Odinist Community of Spain – Ásatrú (Spanish: Comunidad Odinista de España, a neopagan organization in Spain
- Spanish Olympic Committee (Spanish: Comité Olímpico Español
- United States Army Corps of Engineers, a U.S. federal agency

== Places ==
=== Canada ===
- Coe Hill, Ontario, a community in Wollaston

=== United Kingdom ===
- Coe Fen, south of Cambridge, England
- Glen Coe, Scotland
- River Coe, Scotland

=== United States ===
- Coe Township, Rock Island County, Illinois
- Coe, Indiana, an unincorporated community
- Coe, Kentucky, an unincorporated community
- Coe Township, Michigan
- Coe, West Virginia, an unincorporated community
- Mount Coe, Maine
- Coe Glacier, Oregon

== Transportation ==
- Cab Over Engine, a body style of truck, bus or van
- Coe Rail, Inc., a former rail line in Michigan, U.S.
- The IATO airport code for Coeur d'Alene Airport, Idaho, U.S
- The ICAO airline code for Comtel Air of Austria
- The National Rail station code for Coombe Junction Halt railway station, Cornwall, UK
- Certificate of Entitlement, a Singapore vehicle licence

== People ==
- Coe (surname), including a list of people with the name
- Coe (given name), including a list of people with the name or nickname

== Other uses ==
- Coe College, a private liberal arts college in Cedar Rapids, Iowa, U.S.
- Computer engineering (abbreviated CoE)
- Contingent owned equipment, owned by UN member states to peacekeeping missions
- Consistent or common operating environment, or Standard Operating Environment, for software
- coe, ISO 639-3 code for the Koreguaje language of Colombia
- Communication on Engagement, submitted by non-business participants with the UN Global Compact on corporate sustainability and social responsibility
- Conjugated oligoelectrolytes, a class of synthetic antimicrobials

== See also ==
- Council of Elders (disambiguation)
- Church of England, or C of E
- Coe House (disambiguation)
- Coe Memorial Park, Torrington, Connecticut
- Coes, a given name and a surname
