= Coe House =

Coe House may refer to:

- Amos B. Coe House, Minneapolis, Minnesota
- Coe House (Grass Lake, Michigan), also known as the Henry and Aurora (Walker) Vinkle House
- Coe House (Burkesville, Kentucky)
- Coe Hall Historic House Museum in the Planting Fields Arboretum State Historic Park, Oyster Bay, New York
- Joost Van Nuyse House, also known as the Ditmas Coe House, Flatlands, Brooklyn, New York
- Coe House at the Gypsy Camp Historic District, Benton County, Arkansas
