= Coes =

Coes is a surname and given name which may refer to:

- Coes of Mytilene, 6th century Greek tyrant
- Ben Coes (born 1966), American novelist
- Christopher Coes (born 1984), American political advisor
- George H. Coes (1828–1897), American minstrel music performer
- Harold V. Coes (1883–1959), American industrial engineer
- Loring Coes (1812–1906), American inventor of the monkey wrench, industrialist and politician

== See also ==
- Kos (disambiguation)
