= Mountain Parkway (disambiguation) =

Mountain Parkway is a freeway in eastern Kentucky.

Mountain Parkway may also refer to:

- Mountain Parkway Byway, a scenic byway in West Virginia
- Bear Mountain Parkway, in Westchester County, New York
- Green Mountain Parkway, a proposed scenic highway in Vermont
