= Hacker Valley, West Virginia =

- Unincorporated community
- Location of Hacker Valley, West Virginia
- Coordinates: 38°39′09″N 80°23′01″W
- Country: United States
- State: West Virginia
- County: Webster
- Elevation: 1,499 ft (457 m)
- Time zone: UTC-5 (Eastern (EST))
  - Summer (DST): UTC-4 (EDT)
- ZIP code: 26222
- Area code: 304/681
- GNIS feature ID: 1539816

Hacker Valley is an unincorporated community in northern Webster County, West Virginia, United States, along the Left Fork of the Holly River. Its ZIP Code is 26222.

== History ==
The valley was named for its first settler, John Hacker (1743-1824), who reportedly took possession of a tract of land nearby by means of "tomahawk mark" circa 1772. Hacker Valley is home to Holly River State Park and serves as the southern end of the Mountain Parkway Byway scenic byway. The community is also contains the grave of George Lough (died 1817), which is believed to be the oldest marked grave in northern Webster County.

Hacker Valley was the subject of a November 26, 2010 story by Noah Adams of National Public Radio on the impact of the "suspension" of the local post office by the U.S. Post Office in 2009. The suspension had effectively closed the post office for use by the public. In 2012 the post office was deemed to be illegally closed, and thus was re-opened in the former Hacker Valley School cafeteria.

The Mollohan Mill is located nearby and was listed on the National Register of Historic Places in 1982.

== School ==
Hacker Valley is home to Hacker Valley Elementary School, serving students in Kindergarten through Grade 8. The school's mascot is the cardinal. The school is part of the Highlanders of Tomorrow Band program, along with Webster Springs Elementary School.

== Industry ==
Near Hacker Valley is a plant of Northwest Hardwoods, which produces dimensional lumber. Numerous potters and artists are also in the area.

== Climate ==
The climate in this area has mild differences between highs and lows, and there is adequate rainfall year-round. According to the Köppen Climate Classification system, Hacker Valley has a marine west coast climate, abbreviated "Cfb" on climate maps.

== See also ==
- Holly River State Park
