= Mountain Parkway Byway =

Two routes in northern Webster County, West Virginia

Route information
- Maintained by WVDOH
- Length: 9.8 mi (15.8 km)
- Existed: August 2, 1999–present

Major junctions
- South end: Intersection of WV 20 and Hodam Creek Road (CR 20/18)
- North end: Upshur–Webster county line at Cleveland

Location
- Country: United States
- State: West Virginia

Highway system
- West Virginia State Highway System; Interstate; US; State

The Mountain Parkway Byway and Mountain Parkway Backway are two routes in northern Webster County, West Virginia. The Byway is a state-designated scenic byway which follows West Virginia Route 20 for 9.8 miles (15.8 km), traversing the headwaters of several mountain streams including the Right Fork Little Kanawha River, Jerry Run, and the Left and Laurel Forks of Holly River. The Backway explores backroads in the same area, is 32 miles (51 km) long, and follows stretches of the Right Fork Little Kanawha River and Left Fork Holly River for portions of its route.

== Mountain Parkway Byway ==
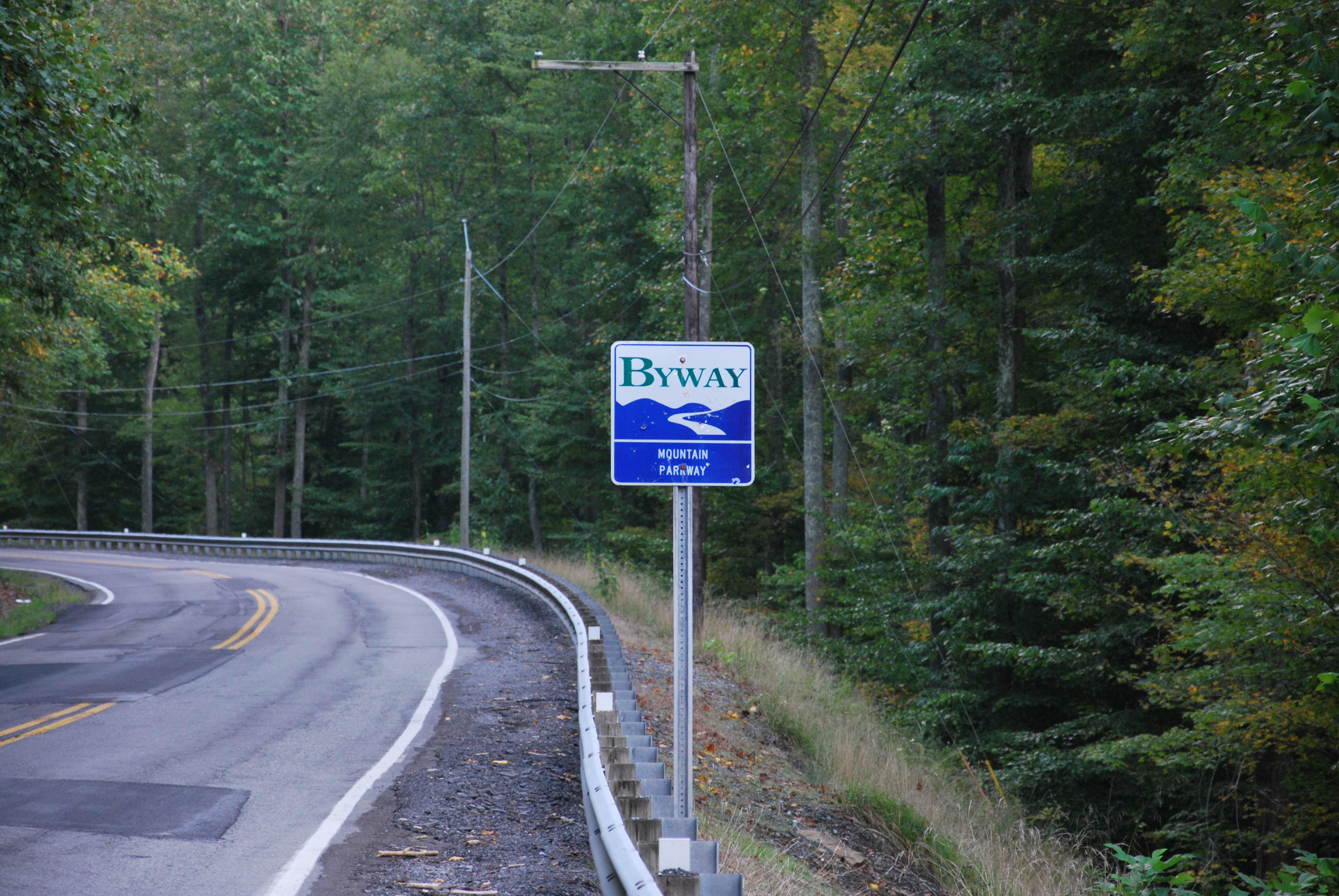
Sign for the Byway

Heading southbound on WV 20, the Byway begins after crossing the Right Fork Little Kanawha River into Webster County. A visitor kiosk is located just south of the county line. From there, visitors can follow WV 20 southbound to see the following sites in sequential order:

=== Cleveland ===
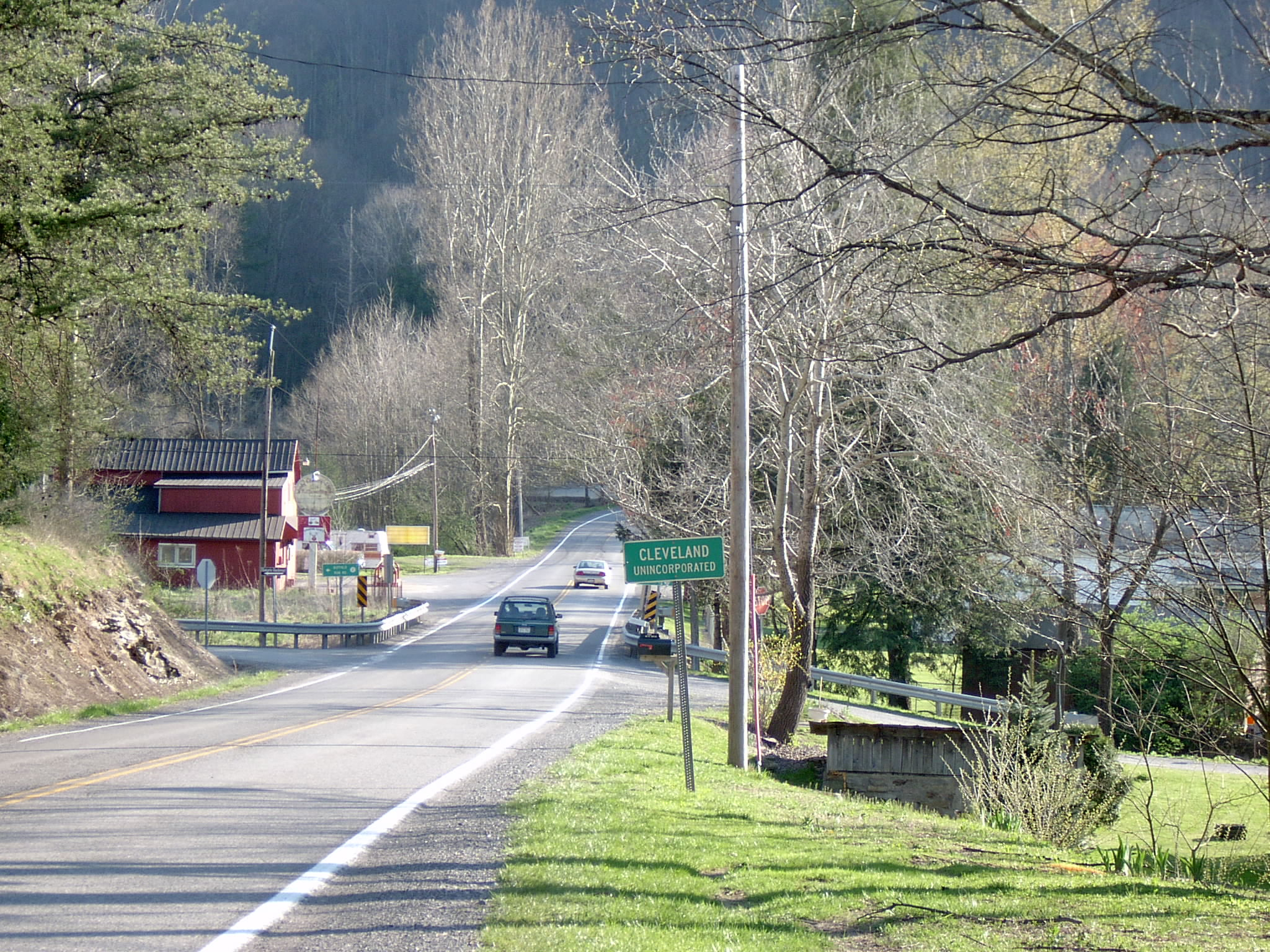
Cleveland, West Virginia

The northernmost village in Webster County, Cleveland was settled in 1844 by Robert McCray Sr. Previously named as Buffalo Fork and Point, it was renamed in honor of President Grover Cleveland in 1885. A post office operated here from 1853–1865 and 1883-1995.

=== Jerry Run Summer Theater ===
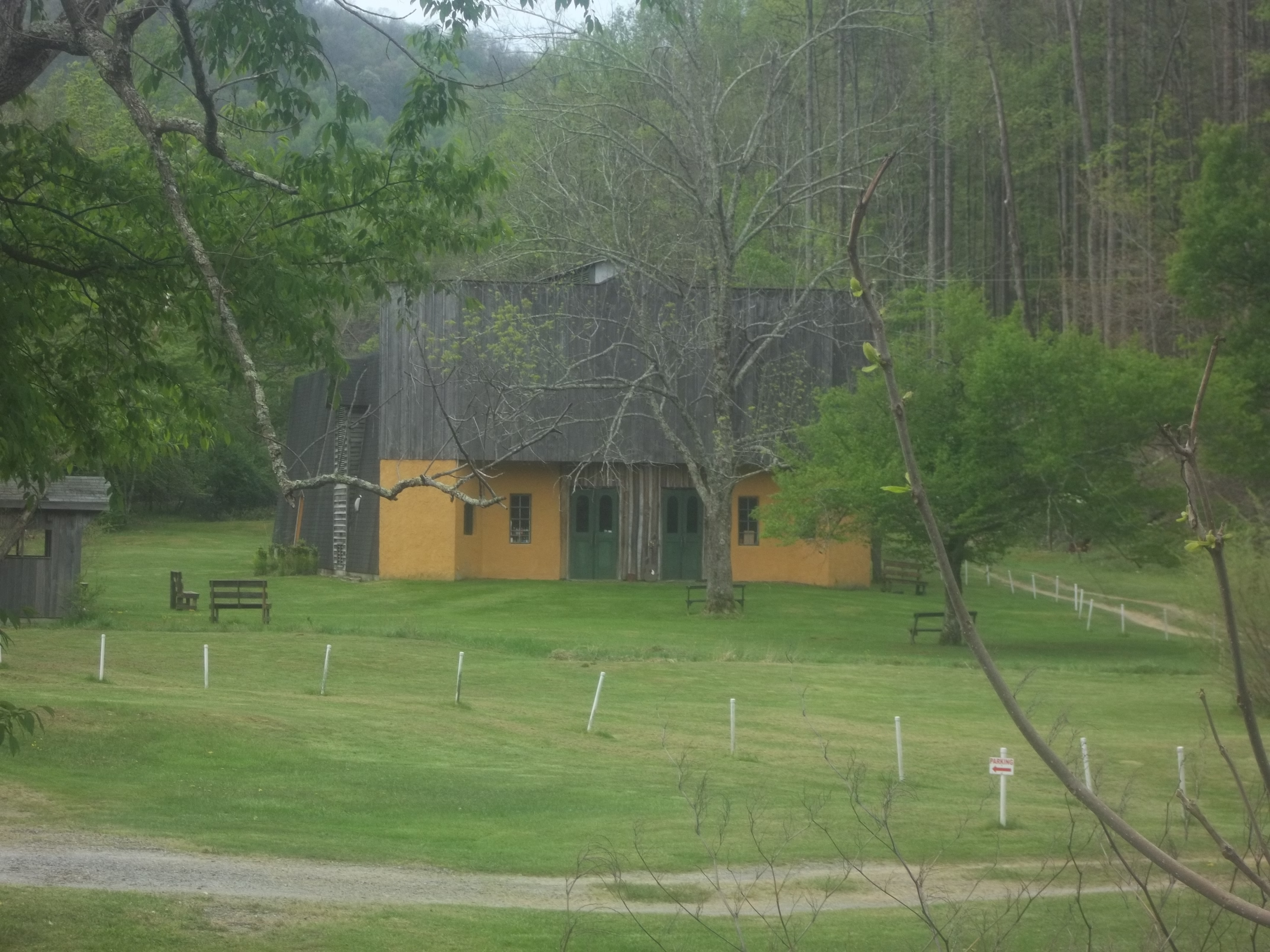
Jerry Run Summer Theater

Located along West Virginia Route 20 is the Jerry Run Summer Theater. A large wooden structure containing a stage, snack bar and other amenities. It has seating for 150 people. Live Bluegrass, country, folk and gospel bands appear weekly on Friday or Saturday evenings from May through early October. The theater is owned by area residents Dusty and Renee Anderson.

=== Sharon ===
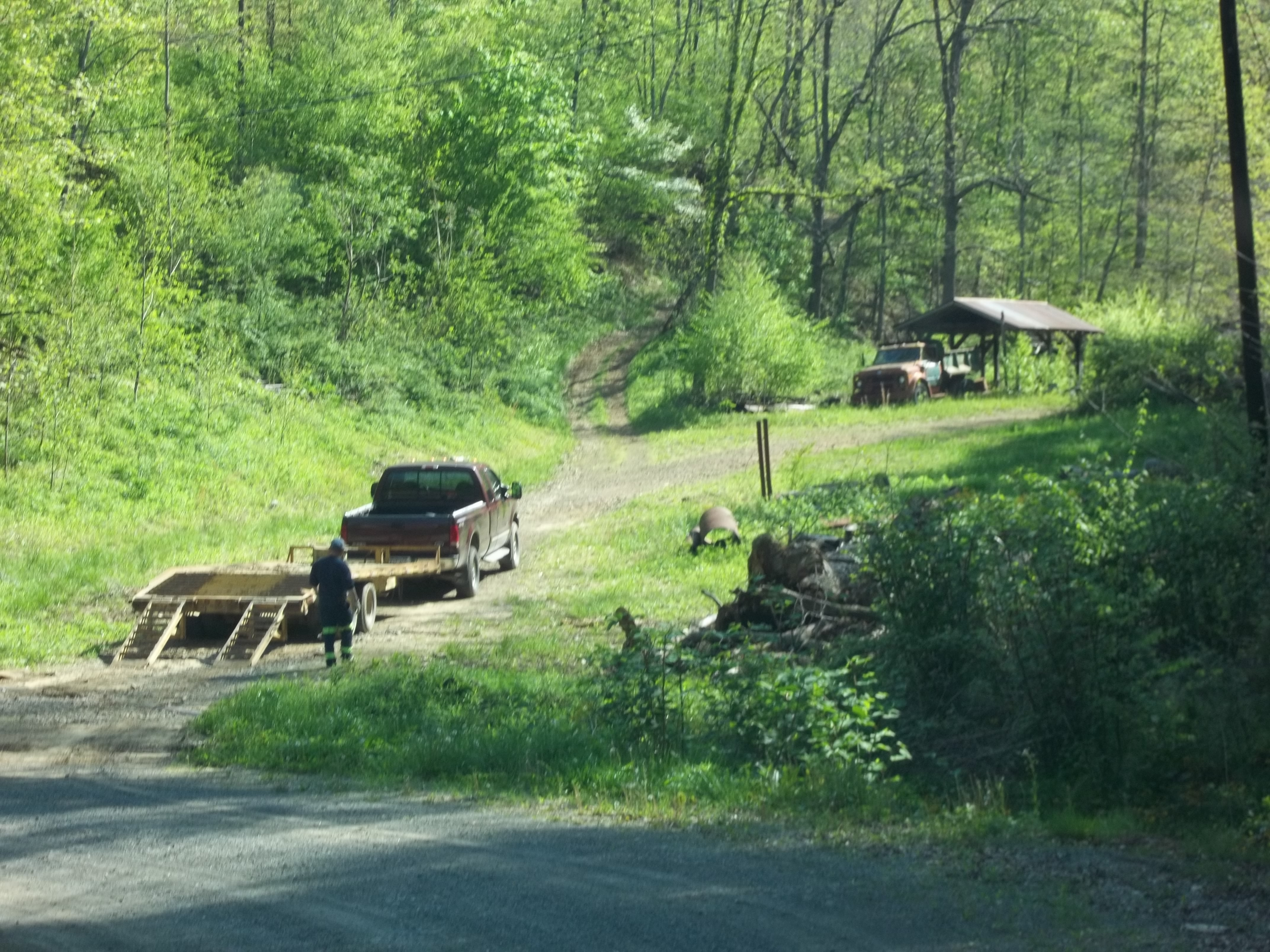
Sharon Post Office Site

At Jerry Run is the site of the Sharon post office that served the Jerry Run community from 1890 to 1900. Dr. William W. Hutchinson served two terms as postmaster. Patrick W. Bruffey, another early resident, was postmaster a short while, after having served as superintendent of Webster County Schools.

=== Old Sulphur Spring ===
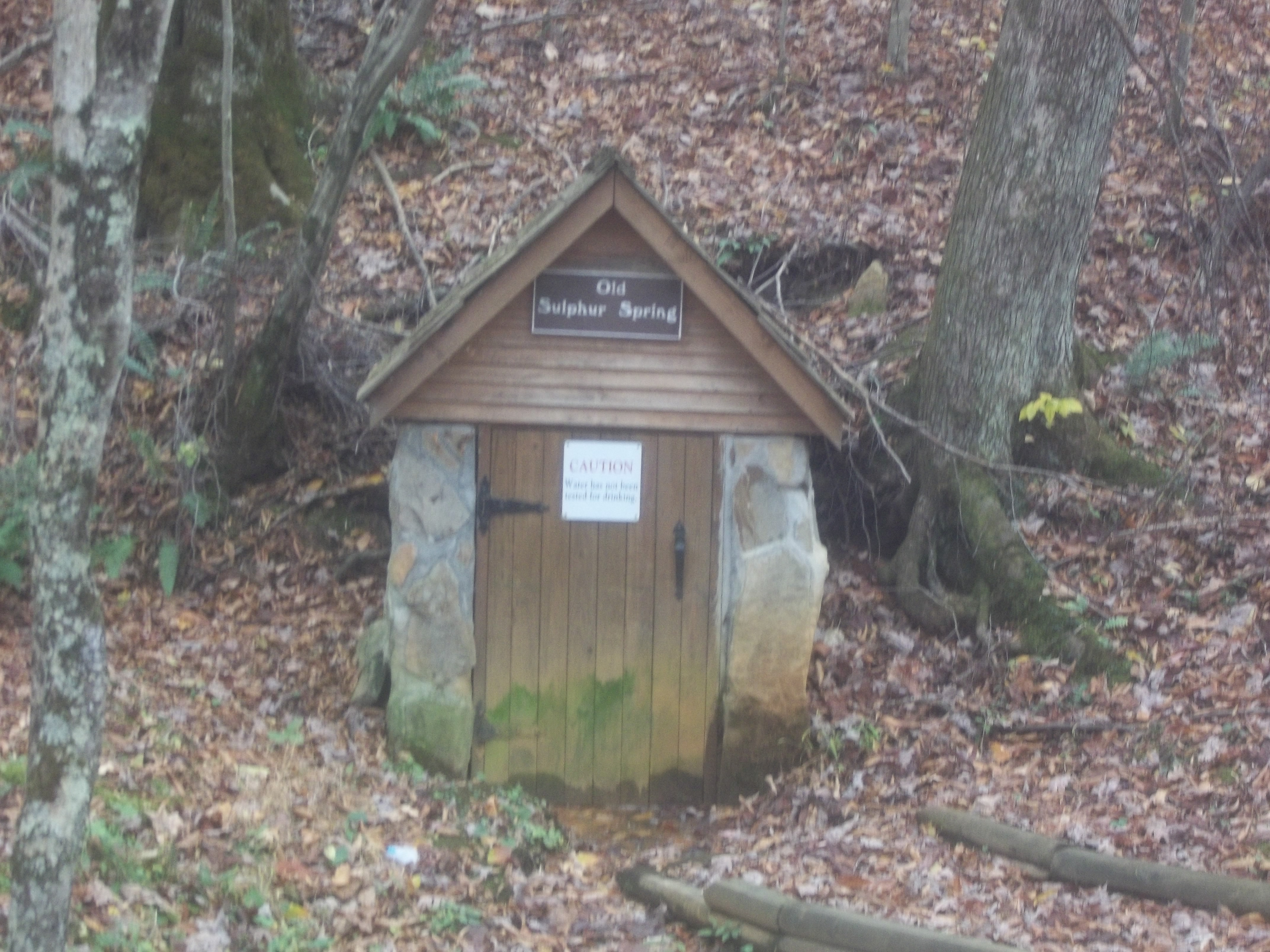
Old Sulphur Spring

Located at Jerry Run is the Old Sulphur Spring. During the late 19th and early 20th centuries, the spring provided water for the travelers and the nearby Jerry Run one-room school. It is a favorite gathering site for locals in the community.

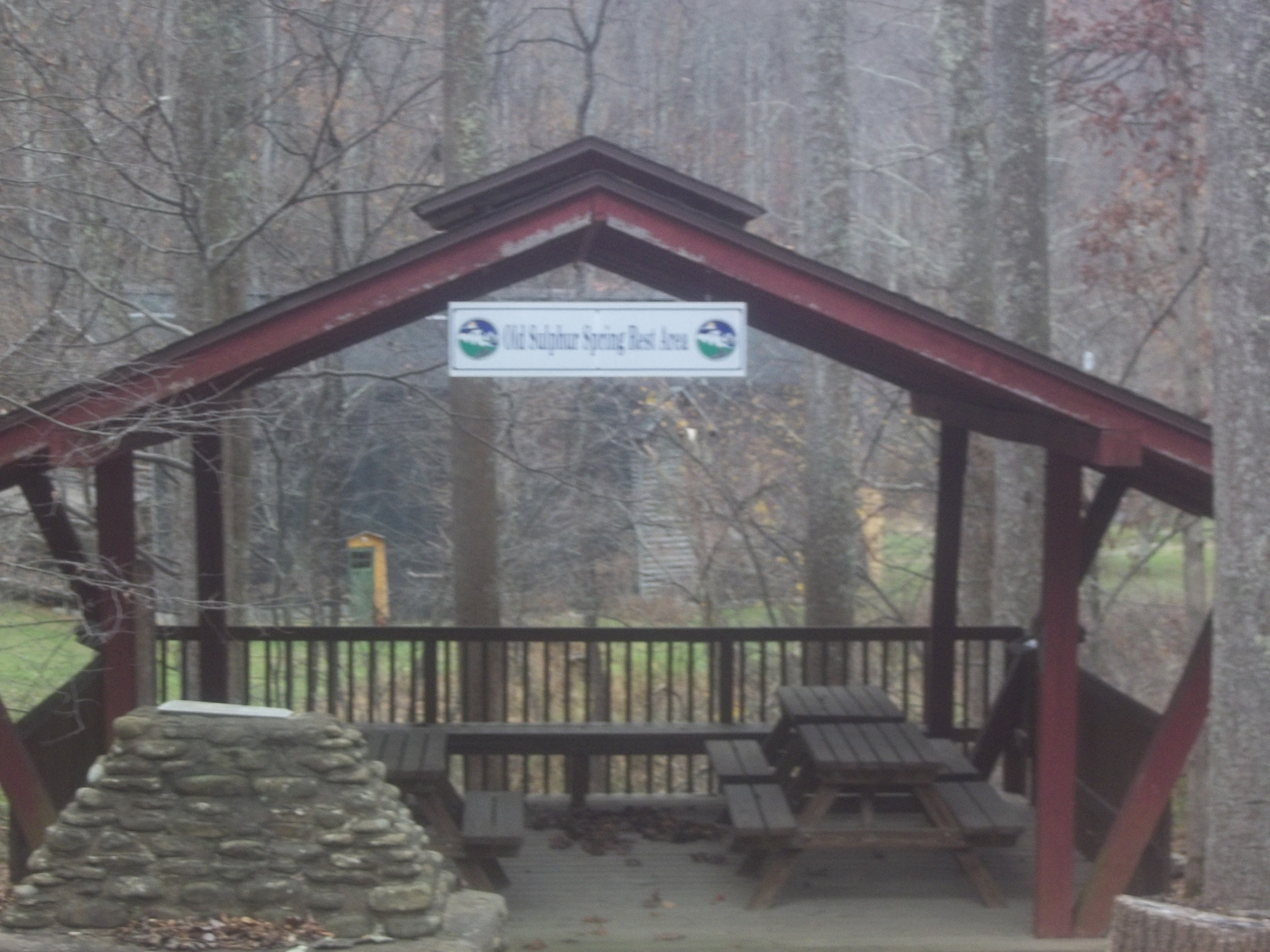
Old Sulphur Spring Rest Stop

Located near the spring are a shelter, picnic table, and stone fireplace. This shelter is being used as a rest stop along the Mountain Parkway Byway.

=== Hacker Valley ===
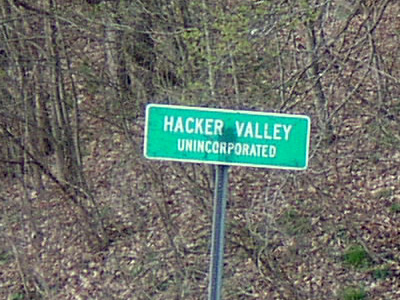
Hacker Valley sign

The village of Hacker Valley was named in honor of John Hacker. Hacker reportedly took possession of a tract of land nearby by "tomahawk mark" around 1772. A post office operated from 1856-1892 as Hacker's Valley.

=== Holly River State Park ===
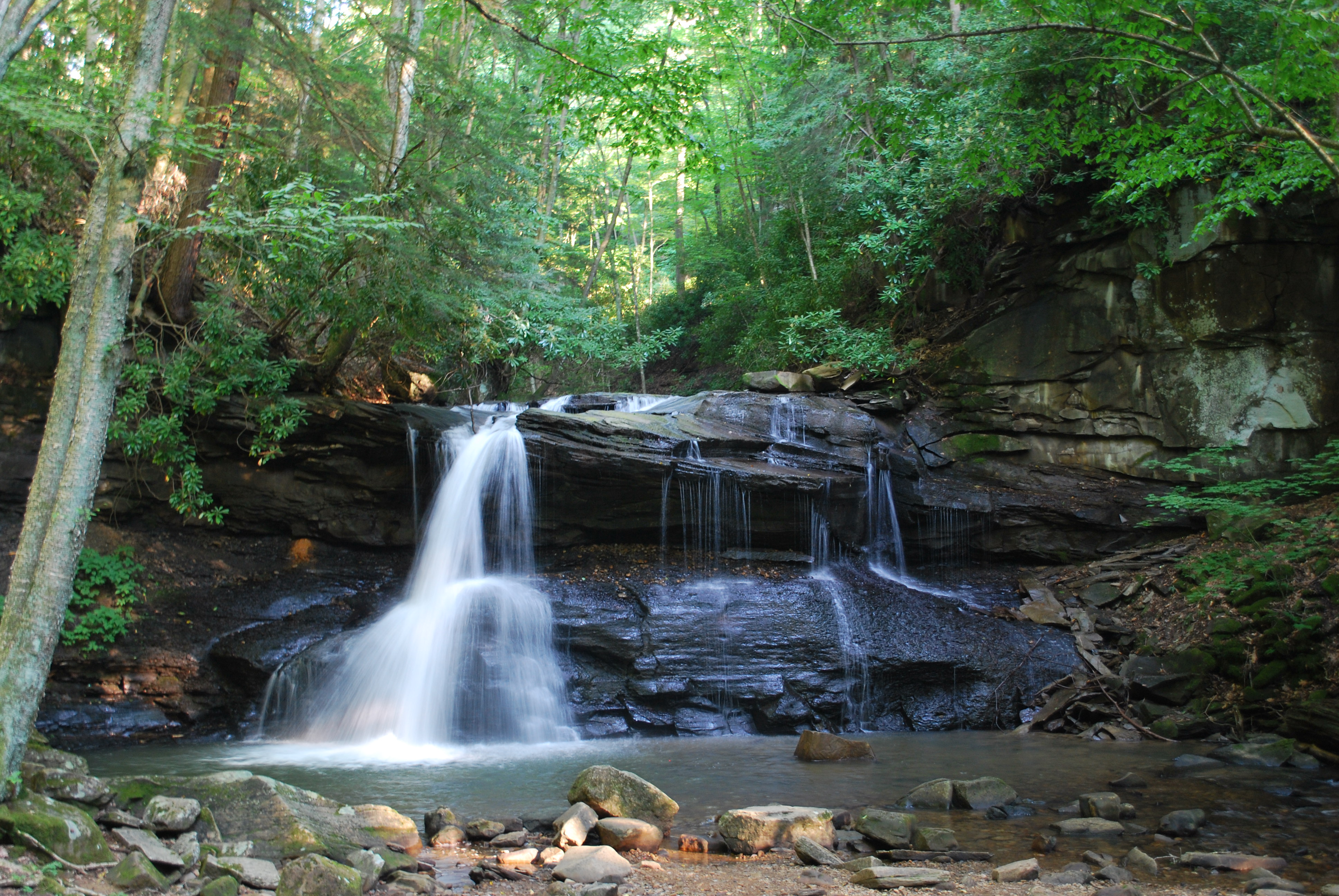
Upper Falls at Holly River State Park

Situated along Laurel Fork is Holly River State Park, the second-largest state park in West Virginia at 8,294 acres (34 km^{2}). The park is known for its mountainous setting and contains several waterfalls. Other recreational activities such as camping, picnicking, and swimming is also possible in the park.

== Mountain Parkway Backway ==
Mountain Parkway Backway
- Location: Junction of WV 20 and Replete Road (CR 3) to junction of WV 20 and Boggs Mill Road (CR 1)
- Length: 32 mi (51 km)
- Existed: August 2, 1999–present

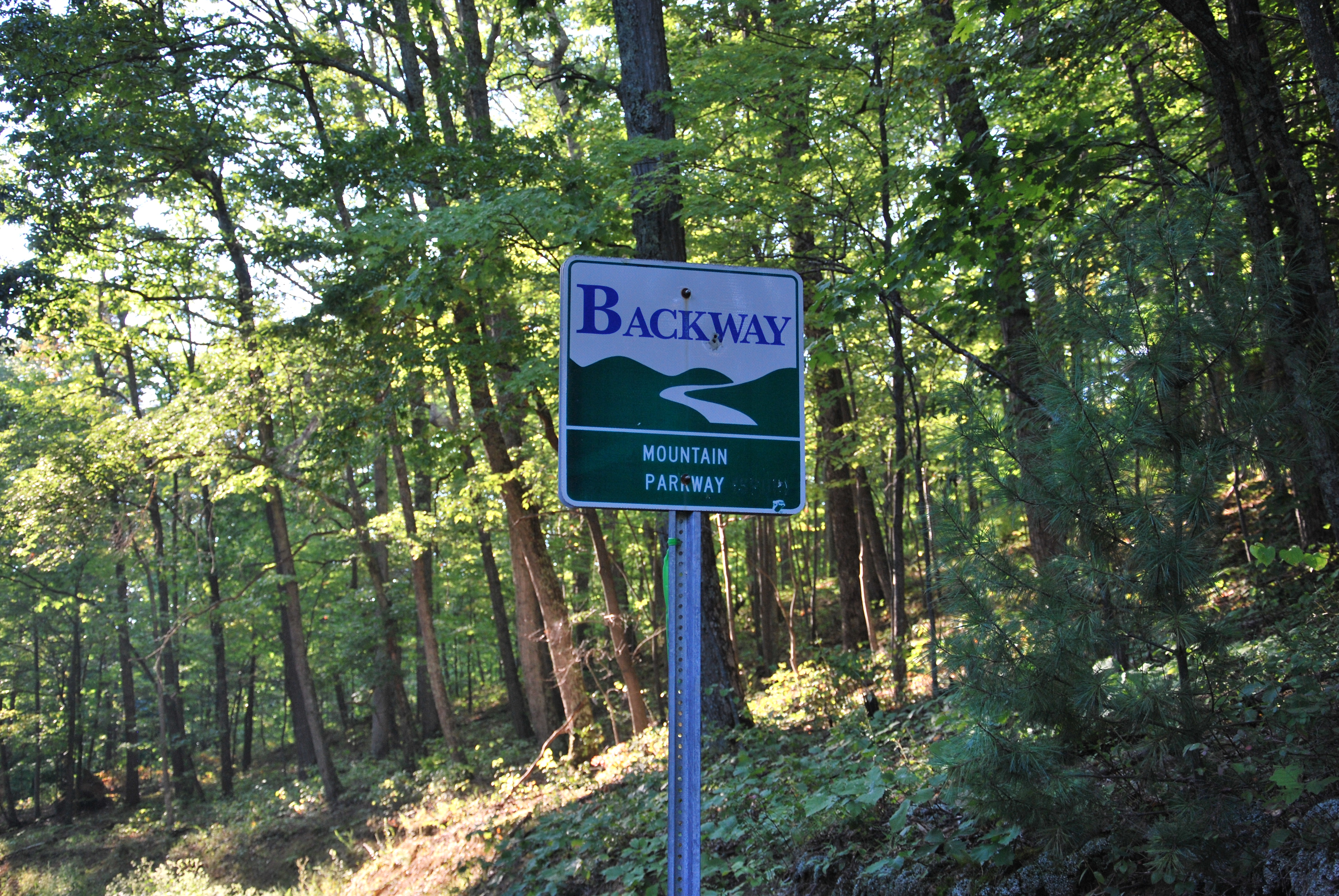
Sign for the Backway

The Mountain Parkway Backway follows lesser traveled routes in the area while paralleling stretches of the Right Fork Little Kanawha River and Left Fork Holly River. From along WV 20 near Cleveland, visitors can follow County Routes 1 (Boggs Mills Road), 1/1 (Three Lick Run Road), 6 (Westbrook Lane), and 3 (Replete Road) in a 32-mile (51 km) circuit that ends back at WV 20 south of Holly River State Park. Travelers should be aware that many of the Backway roads are gravel.

Several additional spurs leading from the Backway mainline also provide access to notable areas sites:

1. County Route 4 (Williams Camp Run Road) begins at its intersection with County Route 1. It leads to the Johnson Home.
2. County Route 8 (Poling Road) branches off CR 3 and takes travelers to the Mollohan Mill.
3. County Route 3/8 (Cowger Hill Road) travels west from CR 3 to Long Run Farm.
4. County Route 20/2 (Mount Zion Road) serves as a connector between CR 3 and WV 20.

=== Boggs Mill Stone ===
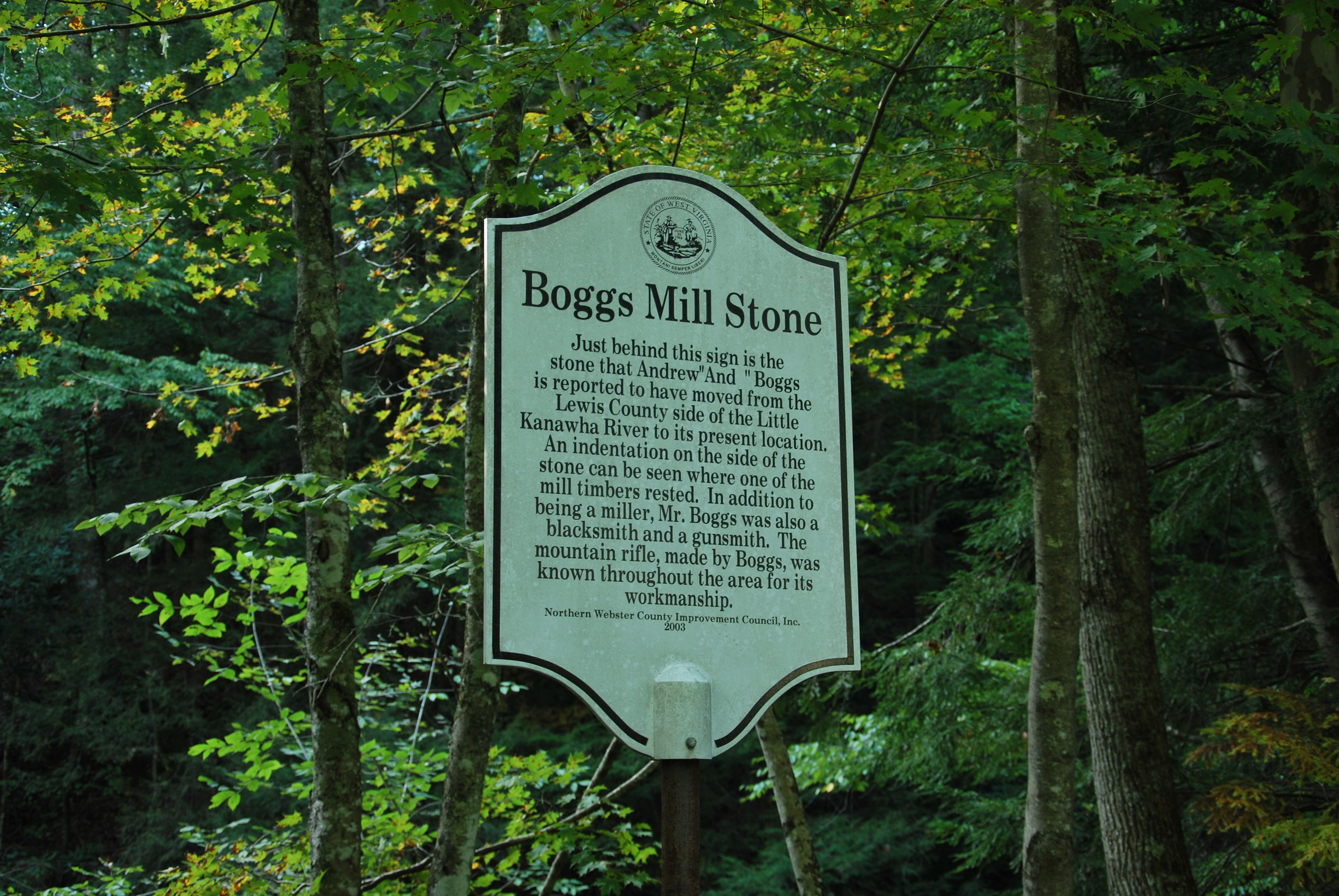
Boggs Mill Stone historical marker

Along Webster County Route 1, a large rock remains that Andrew Boggs reportedly moved from across Right Fork Little Kanawha River to his mill site in the late 19th century.

Boggs was a gunsmith and is also remembered throughout the area for his extraordinary physical strength. Boggs was the first to be buried on top of a hill east of the millstone. The cemetery is known as the Boggs Cemetery. The story is told that during the Civil War, Andy, who was sympathetic to the Confederacy, hid from the Yankees on that hilltop. He is said to have remarked, "It is so high and rugged that if one could escape the Yankees, surely it would provide a good place to hide from the devil."

=== Johnson Home ===
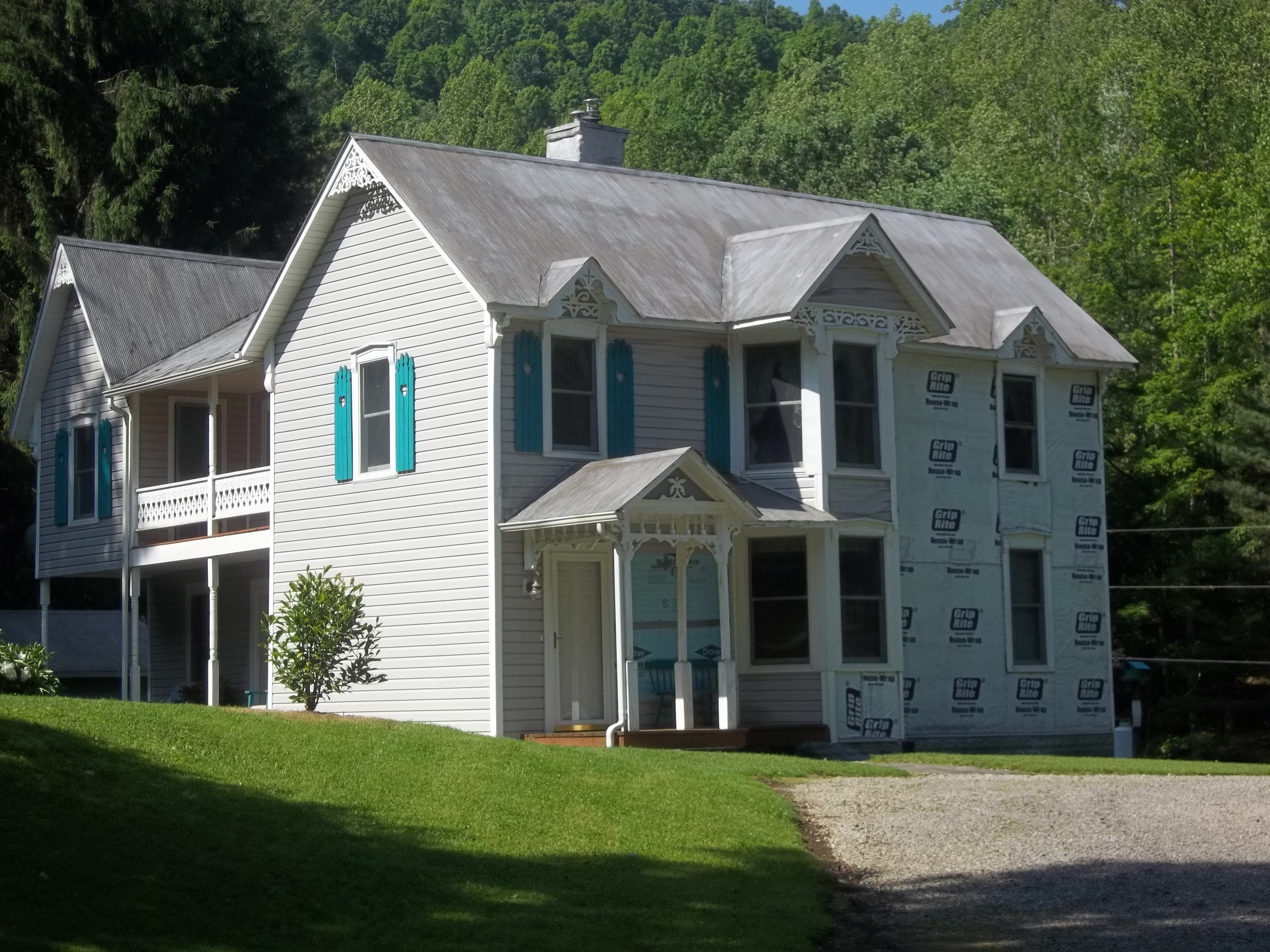
Johnson Home

The Johnson home, constructed in 1887 by John Nathaniel "Squire" Johnson, is a well-preserved example of 19th-century architecture. Johnson was a carpenter and built some of the one-room schools of the area. As of 2003, the home continued to be owned by the Johnson family.

=== Mollohan Mill ===
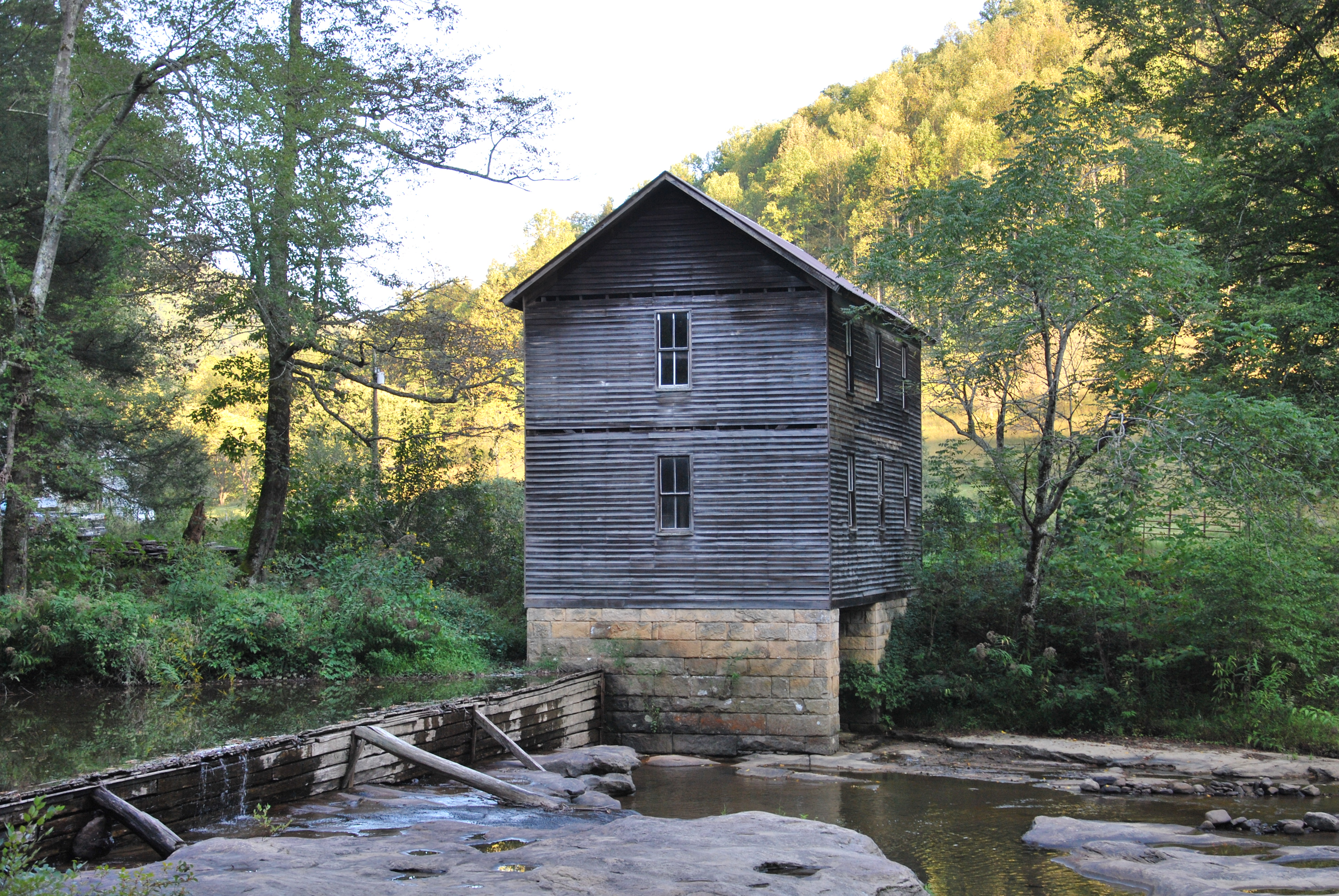
Mollohan Mill

Bernard Mollohan constructed this mill on the Left Fork Holly River in 1894. Operated until damaged by a flood in 1951, the mill was said to be one of the most prosperous area enterprises.

The mill continues to be owned by the same family today through his great-granddaughter, Beth Mollohan. It is unusual in that the water wheel is horizontal to the water rather than vertical. The mill was listed on the National Register of Historic Places on September 2, 1982, the first such listing in Webster County.

=== Hanging Rock ===
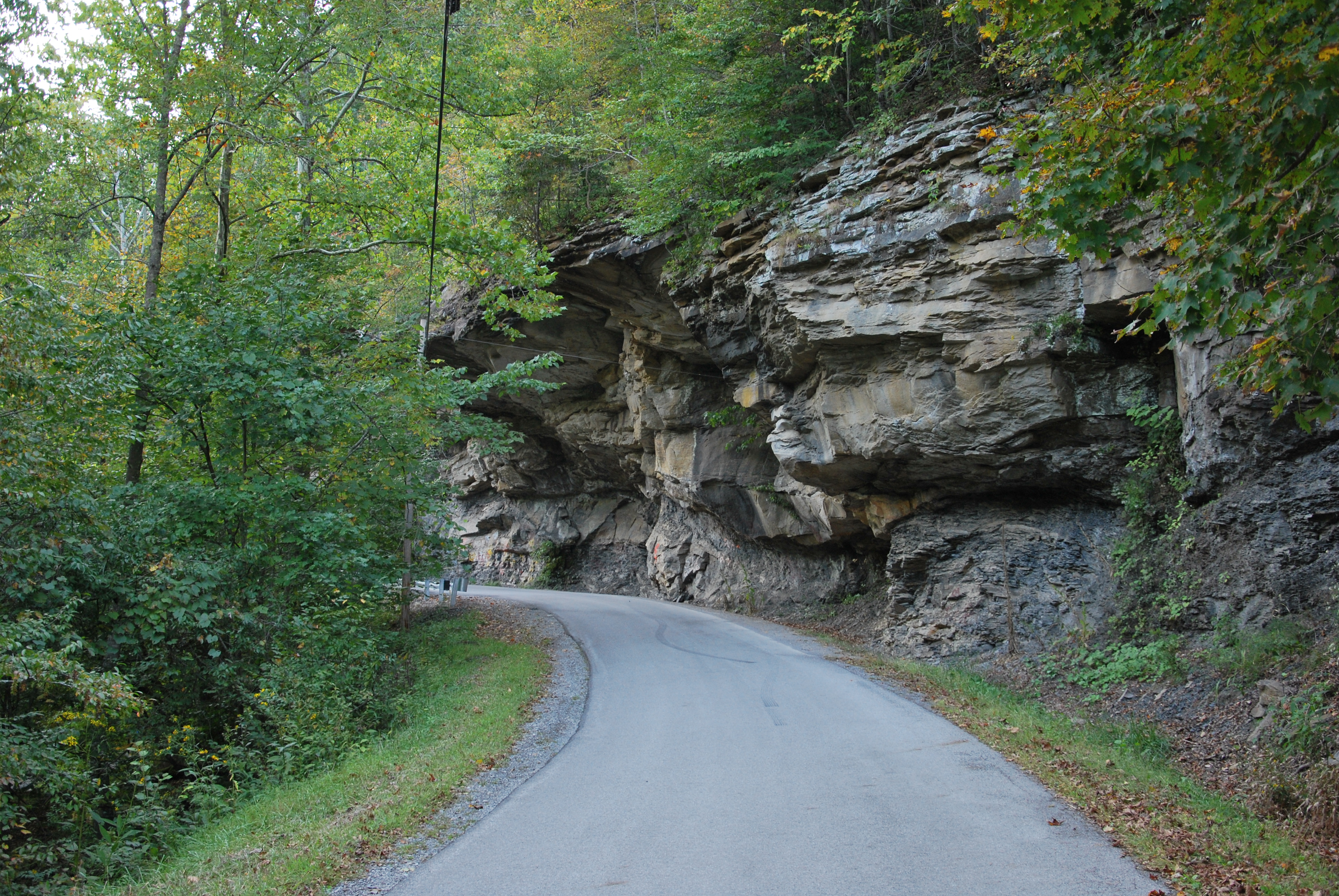
Hanging Rock

Just east of Poling is a large rock formation referred to locally as "Hanging Rock." The cliff extends out over and along Replete Road for several hundred feet. Formed of sandstone, the rock was deposited around 313 million years ago and undercut by water erosion from the adjacent Left Fork Holly River.

The cliff extends out over and along Webster Co Rt 3 for 100 feet or more. Many years ago the rocks were used by pedestrians on horseback as a shelter in bad weather. Because of its uniqueness and beauty, the rocks has been the site of an occasional wedding.

=== Mount Zion Church ===
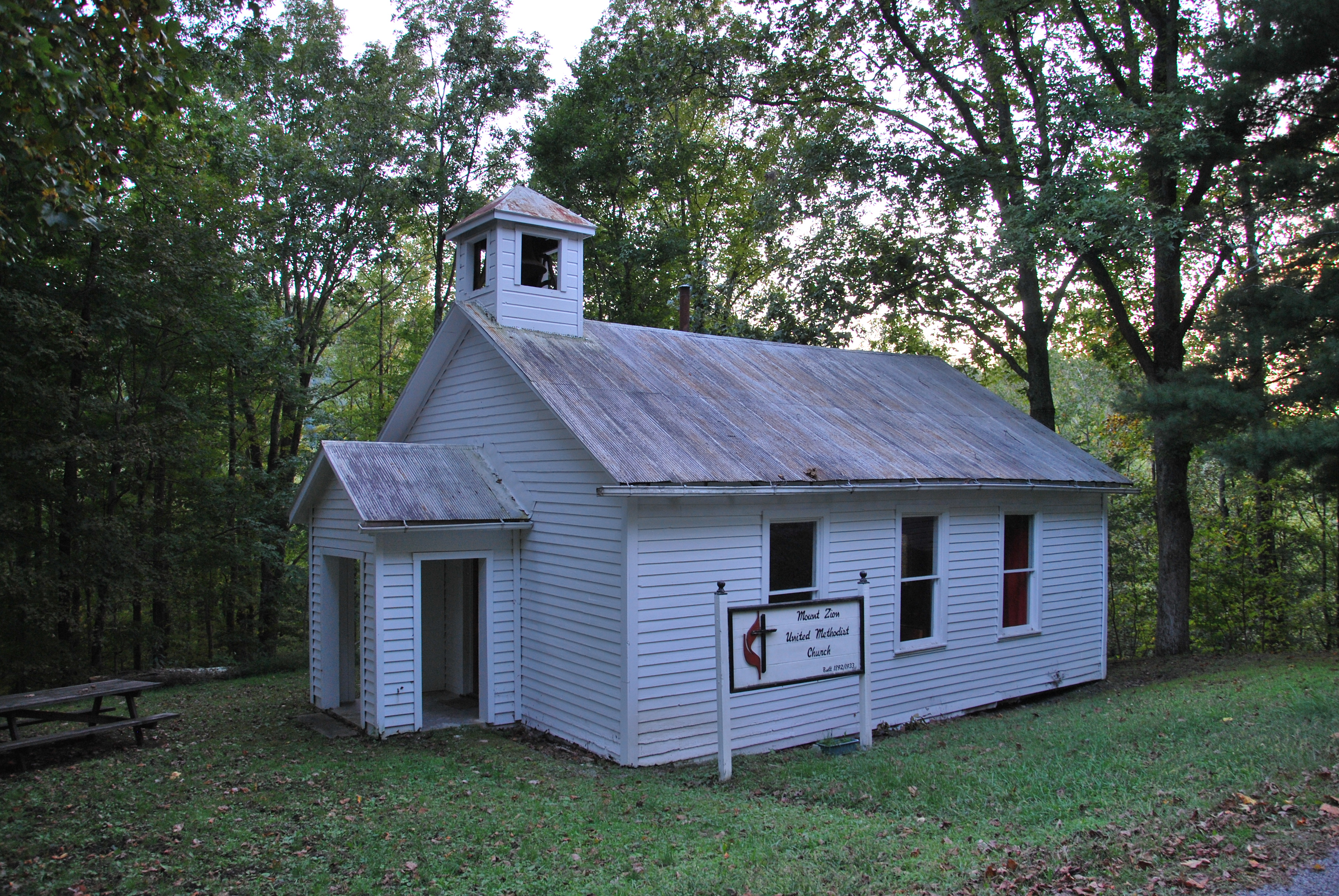
Mount Zion Church

Location at the intersection of Replete and Mount Zion Roads, Mount Zion Church sits on a small bluff several hundred feet above Left Fork Holly River. The church was first erected in 1892 but subsequently destroyed by a 1932 windstorm. Material salvaged from the original building was used to build the current structure in 1933.

=== Lowther Store ===
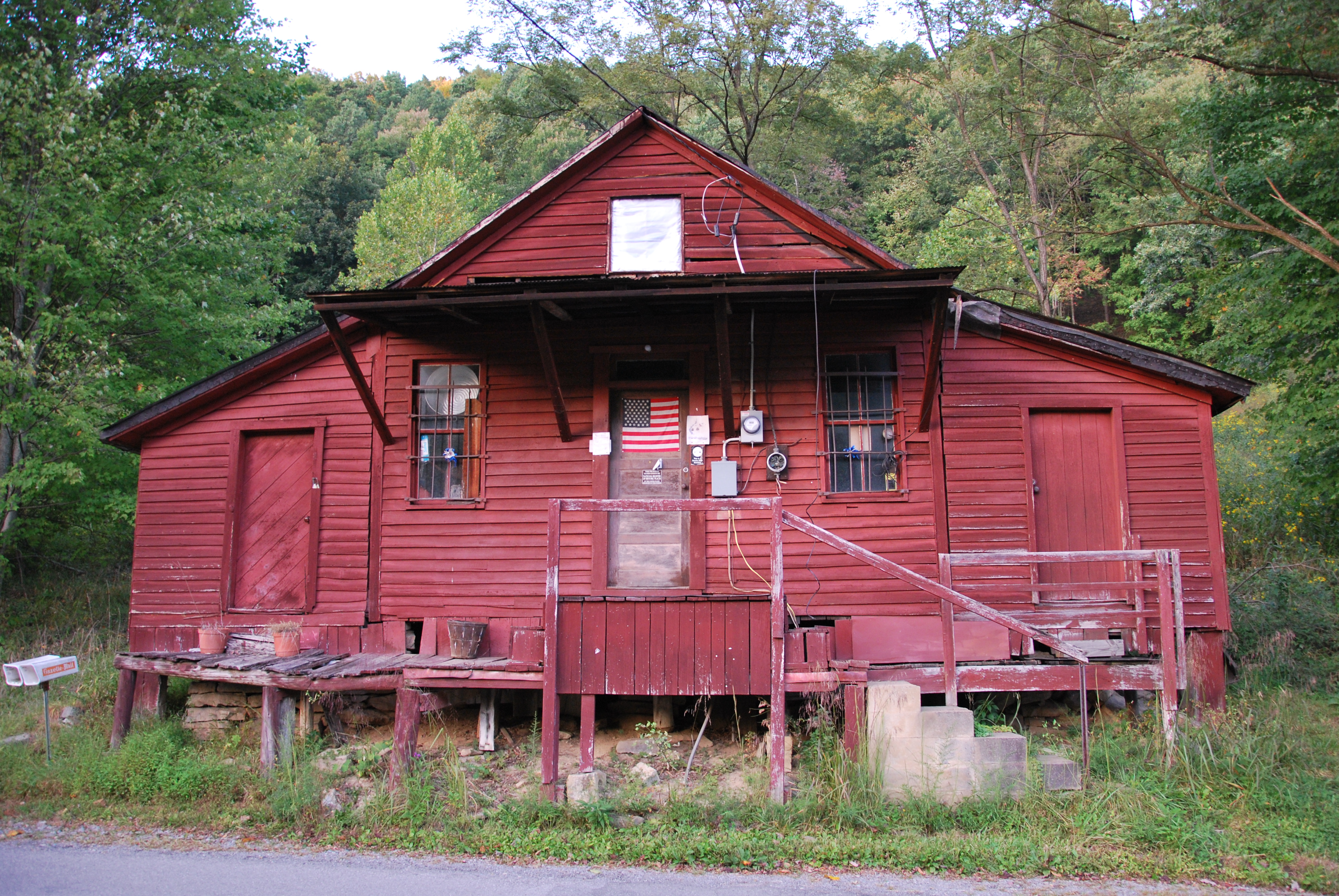
Lowther Store

The store, now known as Lowther Store, was established in 1900 by John A. Hinkle. It is the oldest continuously operating store in Webster County and was listed on the National Register of Historic Places on April 7, 1997. A post office operated at the store from 1903 until at least 1952.

=== Wheeler Overlook ===
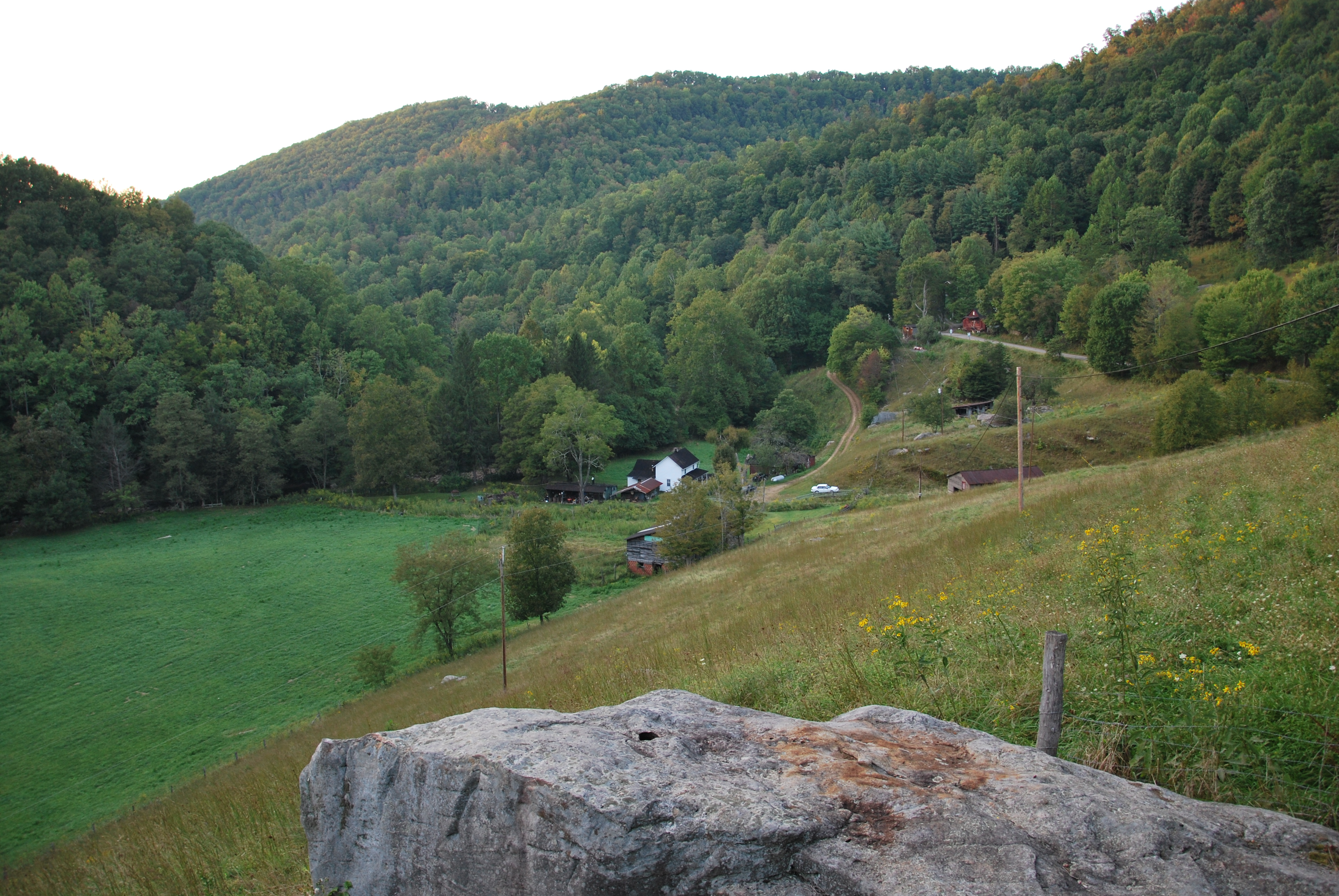
Wheeler Overlook

Along the Mountain Parkway Backway is the small village of Wheeler, named after Galloway Wheeler. The Wheeler Overlook provides a panoramic view of the village of Wheeler. In the early 20th century, Wheeler was the hub of the area containing a store, post office, grist mill, jewelry repair, and photograph shop.

=== Long Run Farm ===
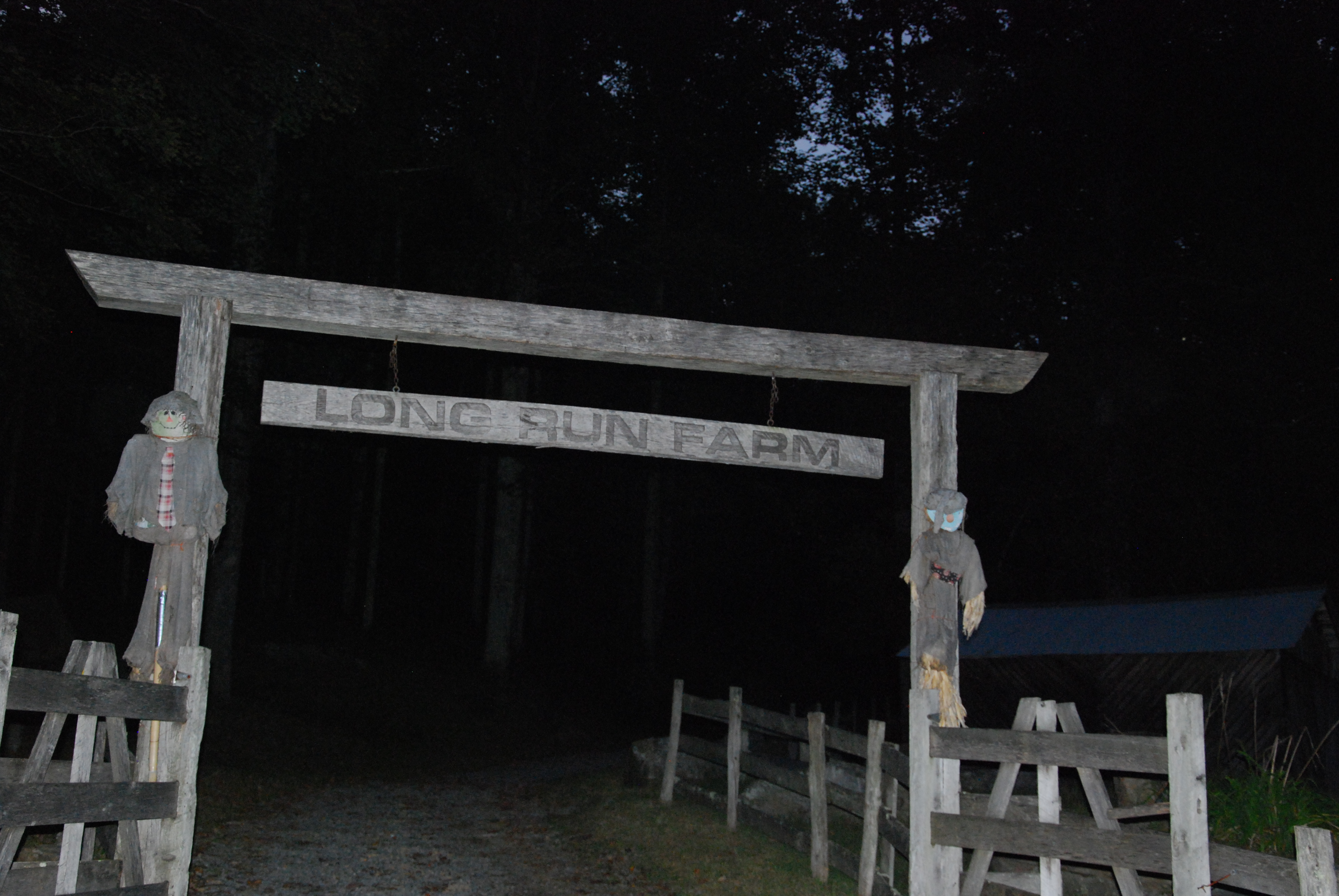
Long Run Farm

Located at the base of Cowger Hill, the Long Run Farm apple orchard serves as the western end of an unsigned Backway Spur along County Route 3/8 (Cowger Hill Road).

=== Pugh ===
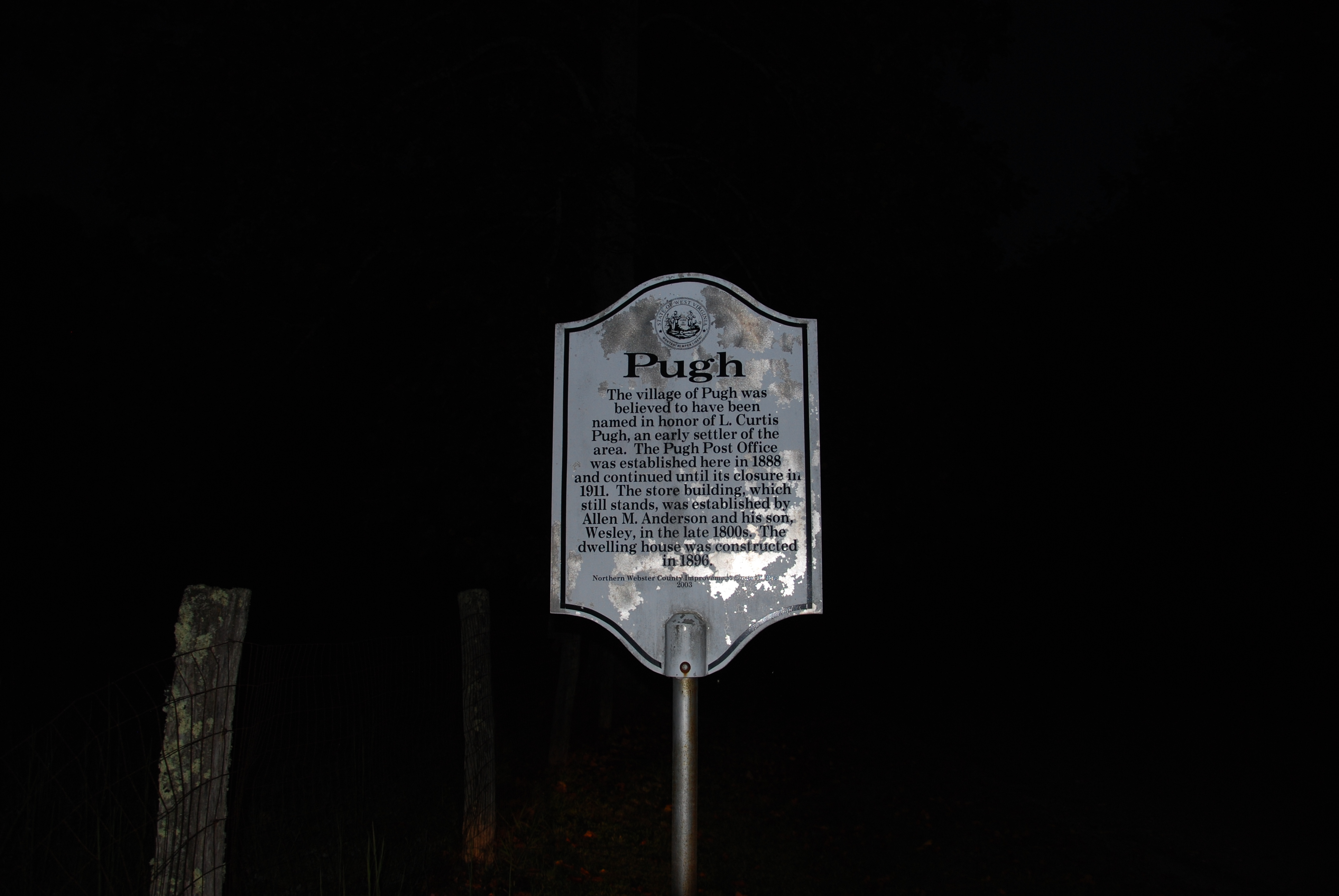
Pugh historical marker

This is the site of the former Pugh post office (1888–1911) and the Wesley Anderson Store and Grist Mill. Anderson's home and store building are still standing.

A 1906 invoice from the Wesley Anderson Store shows the store carried all kinds of merchandise. The invoice lists the materials for burial purposes and one coffin for a child at $6.45 (equivalent to $226 in 2024).

== Visitor kiosks ==
Three information kiosks have been built along the Mountain Parkway Byway and Backway to guide travelers:

Name	Route	Location	Services
Cleveland	Byway	WV 20 north of Cleveland	Map
Hacker Valley	Byway	Intersection of WV 20 and Hodam Creek Road (CR 20/18)	Map
Replete	Backway	Intersection of CR 3 and CR 6	Map and picnic table

== Major intersections ==
The two routes are entirely in Webster County, West Virginia.

Location	mi	km	Destinations	Notes
Hacker Valley	0	0.0	WV 20 south / CR 2018 (Hodam Creek Road)	Southern terminus of the Mountain Parkway Byway
Hacker Valley	1.2	1.9	CR 3 (Replete Road)	Southern terminus of the Mountain Parkway Backway
Cleveland	8.1	13.0	CR 1 (Boggs Mill Road)	Northern terminus of the Mountain Parkway Backway
Cleveland	9.8	15.8	WV 20 north	Northern terminus of the Mountain Parkway Byway
1.000 mi = 1.609 km; 1.000 km = 0.621 mi

== See also ==
- Holly River State Park
