= Coe (given name) =

Coe is a given name, mainly, but not exclusively masculine, which may refer to:

- Coe Finch Austin (1831–1880), American educator and botanist
- Coe Booth, 21st-century American fiction writer
- Coe I. Crawford (1858–1944), American attorney and politician, governor of and senator from South Dakota
- Coe S. Downing (1791–1847), American politician
- Coe Glade (1900–1985), American opera singer
- Chester Coe Swobe (1929–2016), American politician
