= Standard operating environment =

Computer operating system and associated software

A standard operating environment (SOE) is a standard implementation of an operating system and its associated software. Associated names and concepts include:

- Managed operating environment (MOE)
- Consistent or common operating environment (COE)
- Managed desktop environment (MDE)
- Desktop managed services (DMS)
- Standard desktop environment (SDE)
- Standard desktop configuration (SDC)
- Unmanaged operating environment (UOE)
- "Standard image"

Administrators typically implement SOE as a standard disk image for mass deployment to multiple computers in an organisation, to ultimately set security controls and increase the security posture of an environment. SOEs can include the base operating system, a custom configuration, standard applications used within an organisation, software updates and service packs. An SOE can apply to servers, desktops, laptops, thin clients, and mobile devices.

The major advantage of an SOE in a business environment is the reduction in the cost and time taken to deploy, configure, maintain, support and manage computers. By standardising the hardware and software platforms used within an organization, an IT department or service provider can deploy new computers and correct problems with existing computers quickly. A standardized, repeatable and automated solution creates a known, expected and supportable environment. A standardised solution ensures maintaining known outcomes, with automation fostering speed, repeatability and standardization.

The introduction of bring-your-own-device (BYOD) and the significant increase in employee-supplied devices has led many organisations to reconsider the use of an SOE. A number have implemented an unmanaged operating environment where users manage and maintain their own devices, subject to policies enforcing minimum standards.

== Examples ==
There are many Windows deployment guides and tools available from Microsoft and other vendors. Many businesses endeavor to build their own SOE solutions using the Microsoft Business Desktop Deployment (BDD) solution accelerator or Microsoft Deployment Toolkit (MDT). However, some do not have the capability to build all features in one single SOE and their processes often include documented manual configuration steps.

SOEs on Mac OS X, Linux, and other Unix/Unix-like systems can typically be made simply by creating and deploying disk images. This can be achieved using tools such as Disk Utility and dd. Whereas deploying a disk image originating from a system with non-identical hardware will often result in boot failure with Windows, the process is generally achievable on Unix systems with the caveat that the systems must be of the same computer architecture and drivers will need to be installed on the image for all the possible hardware configurations. Since Apple does not have third party computer manufacturers usually only hardware add-ons are a concern with respect to drivers. On Linux most hardware with kernel support can be auto-detected. Boot scripts can be used for automated post-deployment configuration.

There are also a number of vendor-specific SOE systems for various Linux/Unix-like distributions. For Solaris the use of jumpstart scripts is more frequent to ease the automation of setting specific parameters for each system. In Red Hat Enterprise Linux this is typically done by using kickstart scripts, there are specific products to create and manage an SOE like Red Hat Network Satellite Server which avoid the disk space usage and maintenance difficulties of managing disk images.
