= Coe Memorial Park =

Park in Torrington, Connecticut, US

Coordinates: 41.7991°N 73.12177°W

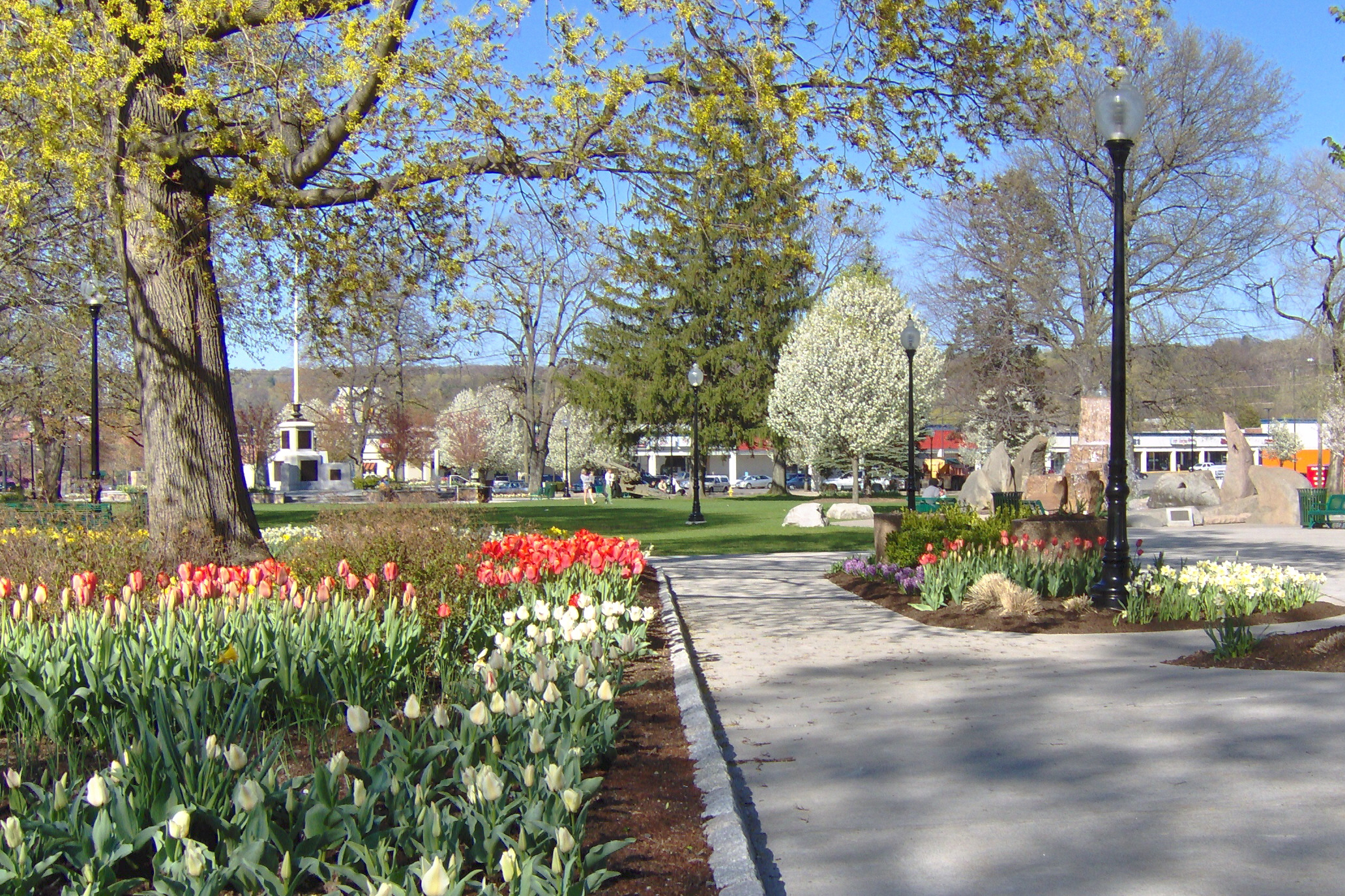
Coe Memorial Park in spring 2006

Coe Memorial Park is located in Torrington, Connecticut.

== Origins ==
Torrington’s original town common was in what is now a rural area off University Drive; no evidence of it remains. Today, Coe Memorial Park, located just south of the Naugatuck River, functions as the town green. It was given to the Town of Torrington on November 6, 1906, by Adelaide E. Coe Godfrey, Edward Turner Coe, and Ella Seymour Coe, as a memorial to their parents, Lyman Wetmore Coe, President of Coe Brass Company, and his wife, Eliza Seymour Coe, whose home had been on the property. The donation was made with several stipulations including that (1) a street, known as Elm Street, near the rear of the property be removed and abandoned, (2) the Coe’s home and outbuildings be removed; (3) Mrs. Coe’s large, Victorian greenhouse be removed, and (4) a monument be erected acknowledging the gift and its benefactors. These were unfortunate losses, but it gave the town a green or park at the fringe of the center. Additional parcels were later added to the Park and today, it covers about five acres.

== Designer ==
Coe Memorial Park was designed by James W. Scott in 1907 or 1908. Scott is also responsible for Keney Park in Hartford. Percival Gallagher of the Olmsted Brothers firm in Boston had been retained by the town selectmen to prepare drawings for the Park in 1907. These drawings were completed, but not executed even though a number of later town records credit Mr. Gallagher with the design. Shortly after, the Park was completed according to Mr. Scott’s plan.

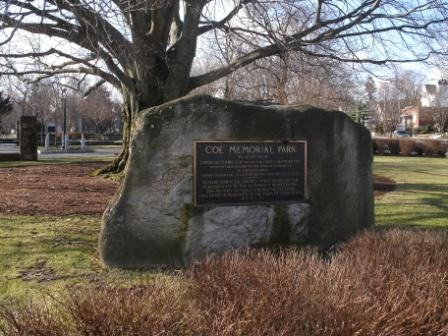
Coe memorial boulder in the park

A great drama was made of the selection of a boulder upon which to place the memorial plaque for the Coes. The selected boulder weighed 15 tons and was moved through the center of town to the Park on the logging wagon pulled by twenty horses. The Civil War monument was originally erected in front of Town Hall in 1879 and was moved to Coe Memorial Park in 1936.

== Memorial Park ==
The Coe Memorial Park Civic Center was built in 1973 on the Park to provide a civic meeting center and offices for the town recreation department much to the dismay of the descendants. A monumental stone sculpture fountain designed by Massachusetts’ artist Edward Monti (who in 2004 worked on a Holmstead-planned public art installation in Quincy, Massachusetts's Merrymount Park) was erected in the Park in 1981 and dedicated to all Veterans of the Vietnam War era. A plan for revitalization of the Park was proposed in 1983, (with the misinformation that the Olmsted Brothers had originally designed the Park); portions of the plan have been executed.

In 1997, the Coe Memorial Park Subcommittee was established by then-Mayor Mary Jane Gryniuk to oversee the management of the Park.

Located on the previous site of the Coe’s grand Victorian home, the Park was created as a living memorial to the Coes by their children, Edward Turner Coe, Adelaide Eliza Coe Godfrey, and Ella Seymour Coe. Adelaide's husband, William H. K. Godfrey, was also one of the property's owners. Over the years, it has taken on the role of a New England town green for those who live in Torrington. It serves a commemorative function as well as providing a gathering place in the heart of the town to celebrate holidays and other events. It offers a welcome refuge in an otherwise densely developed area.

Coe Memorial Park is the beneficiary of a Trust established in 1922 by Adelaide Coe Godfrey, one of the Park’s original donors. The Trust solely provides the funds necessary for the care, maintenance, and improvement of Coe Memorial Park.

== Master Plan ==
Beginning in 2001, the Coe Memorial Park Subcommittee has been working with Ferrero Hixon Associates and the City of Torrington on the Coe Memorial Park Master Plan. These plans were undertaken to complete the historical restoration of the Park grounds. With the assistance of Still River Gardens, LLC, it has become a botanical horticultural oasis in the heart of an urban downtown.

Phase I of the Coe Memorial Park Master Plan for the historic restoration was completed in 2005, re-sculpting the walkways and installing the gardens. Phase II is being developed and construction should begin in the near future. Phase III will address the restoration of the Carriage House which is the sole remnant of Alice Alvord's home and property.
