= Wheeler, West Virginia =

- Unincorporated community
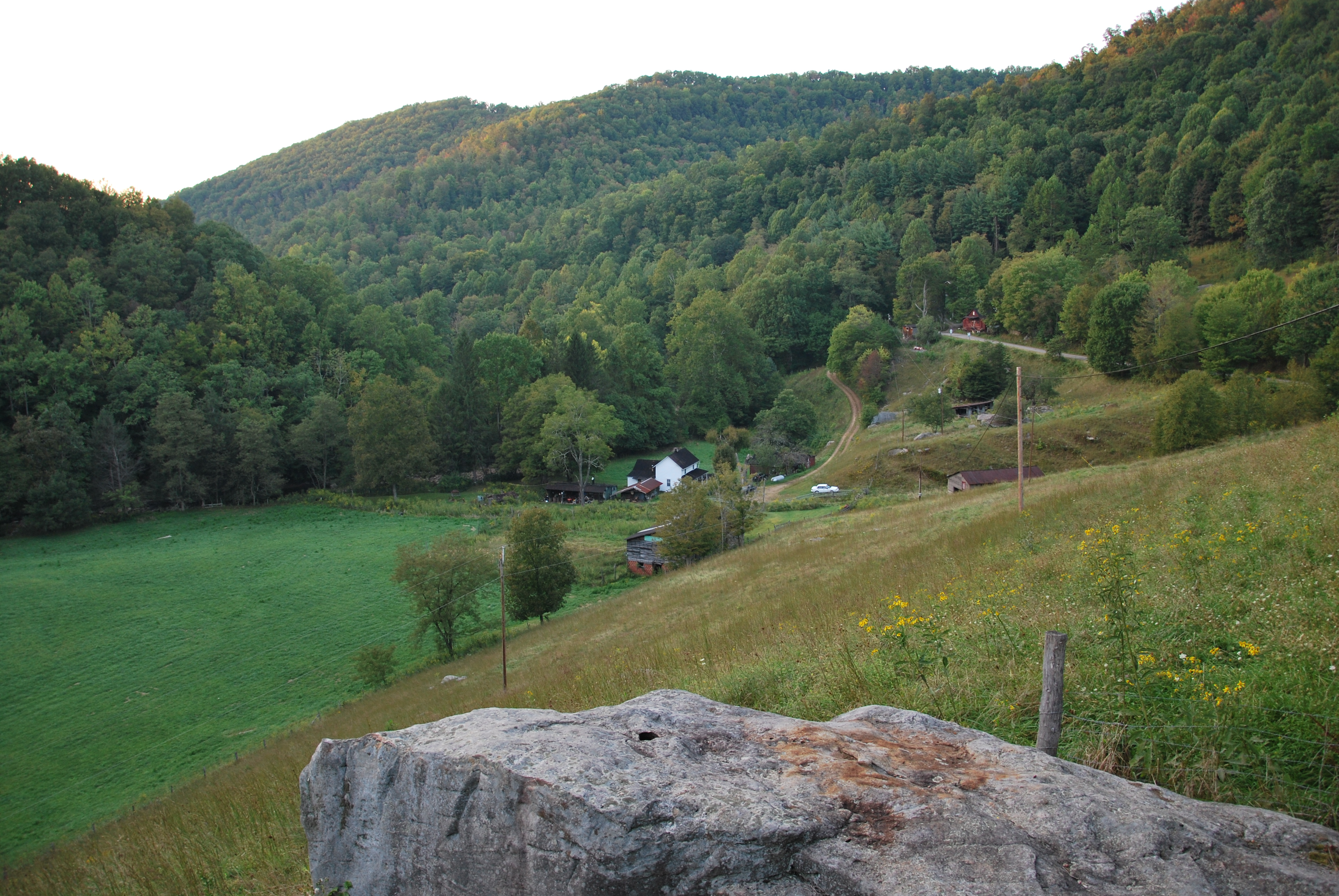
- View of Wheeler from a scenic overlook

- Location within West Virginia Location within the United States
- Coordinates: 38°41′11″N 80°24′09″W
- Country: United States
- State: West Virginia
- County: Webster
- Elevation: 1,401 ft (427 m)
- Time zone: UTC-5 (Eastern (EST))
  - Summer (DST): UTC-4 (EDT)
- Area codes: 304 & 681
- GNIS feature ID: 1549986

Wheeler is an unincorporated community in Webster County, West Virginia, United States. Wheeler is 14.5 miles (23.3 km) north of Webster Springs.

The community was named after Galloway Wheeler. Located near Wheeler is the Lowther Store, listed on the National Register of Historic Places in 1997.
