= Harold V. Coes =

American industrial engineer

Harold Vinton Coes (June 21, 1883 – 1959) was an American industrial engineer, partner in Ford, Bacon and Davis Consultants, and 62nd president of the American Society of Mechanical Engineers in 1943–1944.

Coes was born in 1883 in Hyde Park, Boston, son of Zorester Bennett Coes, a Harvard graduate and engineer, and Alice (Miller) Coes. After attending Northeast Manual Training School, he obtained his BSc from the Massachusetts Institute of Technology in 1906.

After graduation in 1906 Coes started his career the industry at the Liquid Carbonic Company, producer of industrial gases. Next he worked for the Searchlight Gas Company of Chicago, and later for the Sentinel Manufacturing Company of New Haven, Connecticut. Subsequently, he worked as industrial engineer for Lockwood, Greene & Company and Gunn, Richards & Company. Later in the 1910s he started as Philadelphia Manager of Ford, Bacon & Davis, where he eventually became partner in the firm.

== Selected publications ==
Books

- Coes, Harold Vinton. Statements and Statistics as Working Tools of Effective Management. American Management Association, 1927.
- Harold V. Coes. Educational orders for peacetime munitions production, 1939.
- Harold V. Coes. Production control; time study and motion study, 1947; 1950.

Articles

- Harold V. Coes, "Making the Factory Fit the Job," in: John R. Dunlap ed. Industrial Management: The Engineering Magazine, Vol. 63. 1922, p. 34-35

Voorkant

- Coes, H. V. "Mechanical scheduling." Dutton HP (ed) 110 (1928): 69–74.
- Harold V. Coes, "Management and the engineer," in: Mining and Metallurgy, Sept. 1943. p. 398-400

Patents

- Coes, Harold V. "Self-contained time-controlled operating mechanism." U.S. Patent No. 1,161,618. 23 Nov. 1915.
- Coes, Harold V. "Heat-distributer [sic] for cooking-compartments." U.S. Patent No. 1,168,857. 18 Jan. 1916.
