= Mollohan Mill =

- U.S. National Register of Historic Places
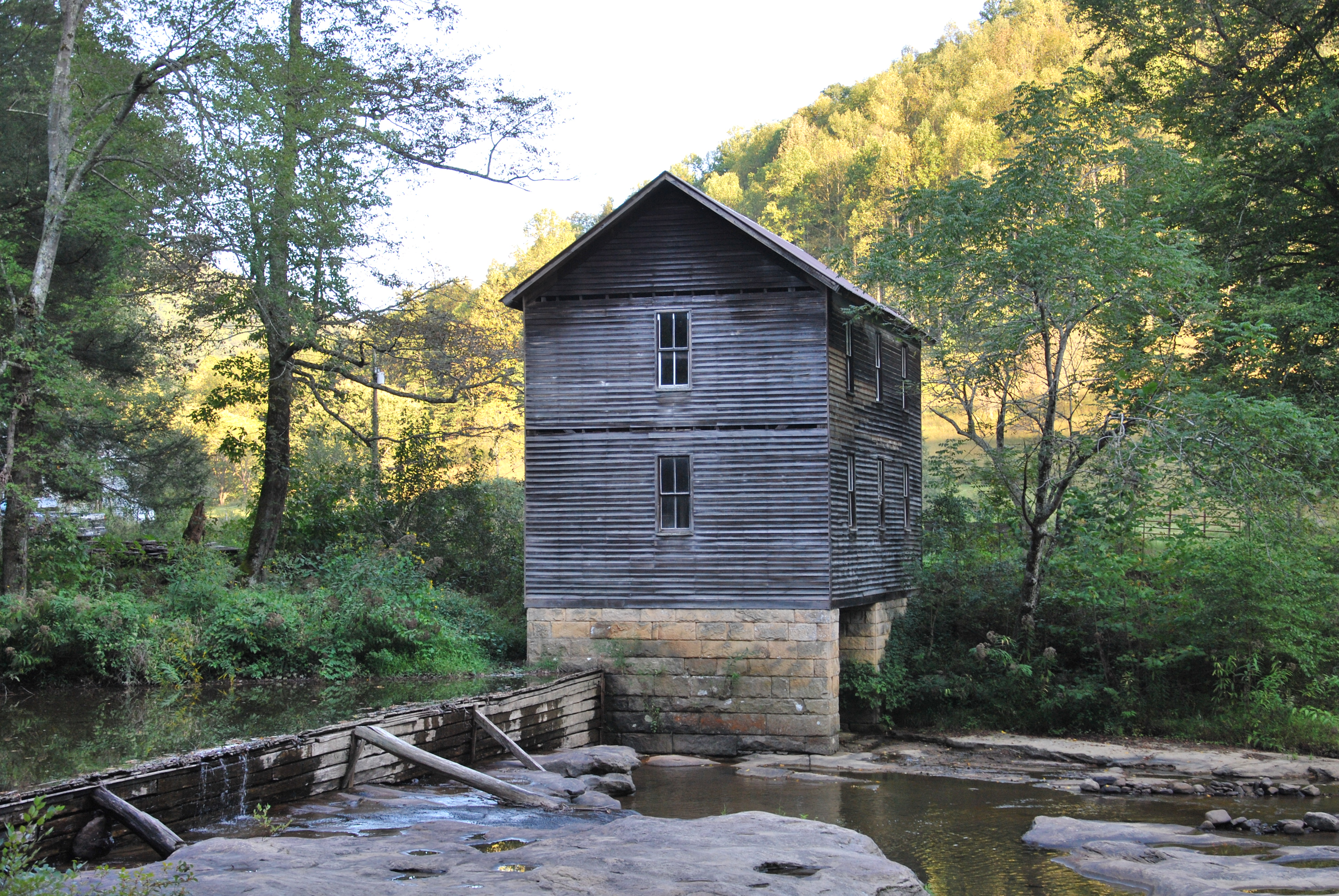
- Mollohan Mill, September 2010

- Location within West Virginia Location within the United States
- Location: On County Route 8, near Replete, West Virginia
- Coordinates: 38°40′55″N 80°28′16″W
- Area: 0.5 acres (0.20 ha)
- Built: 1894
- Architect: Mollohan, Bernard
- NRHP reference No.: 82004331
- Added to NRHP: September 2, 1982

Mollohan Mill is a historic grist mill located near Replete, Webster County, West Virginia. It was built in 1894, and is a two-story frame gable-roofed building on a cut stone foundation. It is constructed of hewn post and beam timber construction and measures 38 feet long and 23 feet wide. The Mollohan Mill operated from 1894 until 1953.

It was listed on the National Register of Historic Places in 1982.
