= Lowther Store =

- U.S. National Register of Historic Places
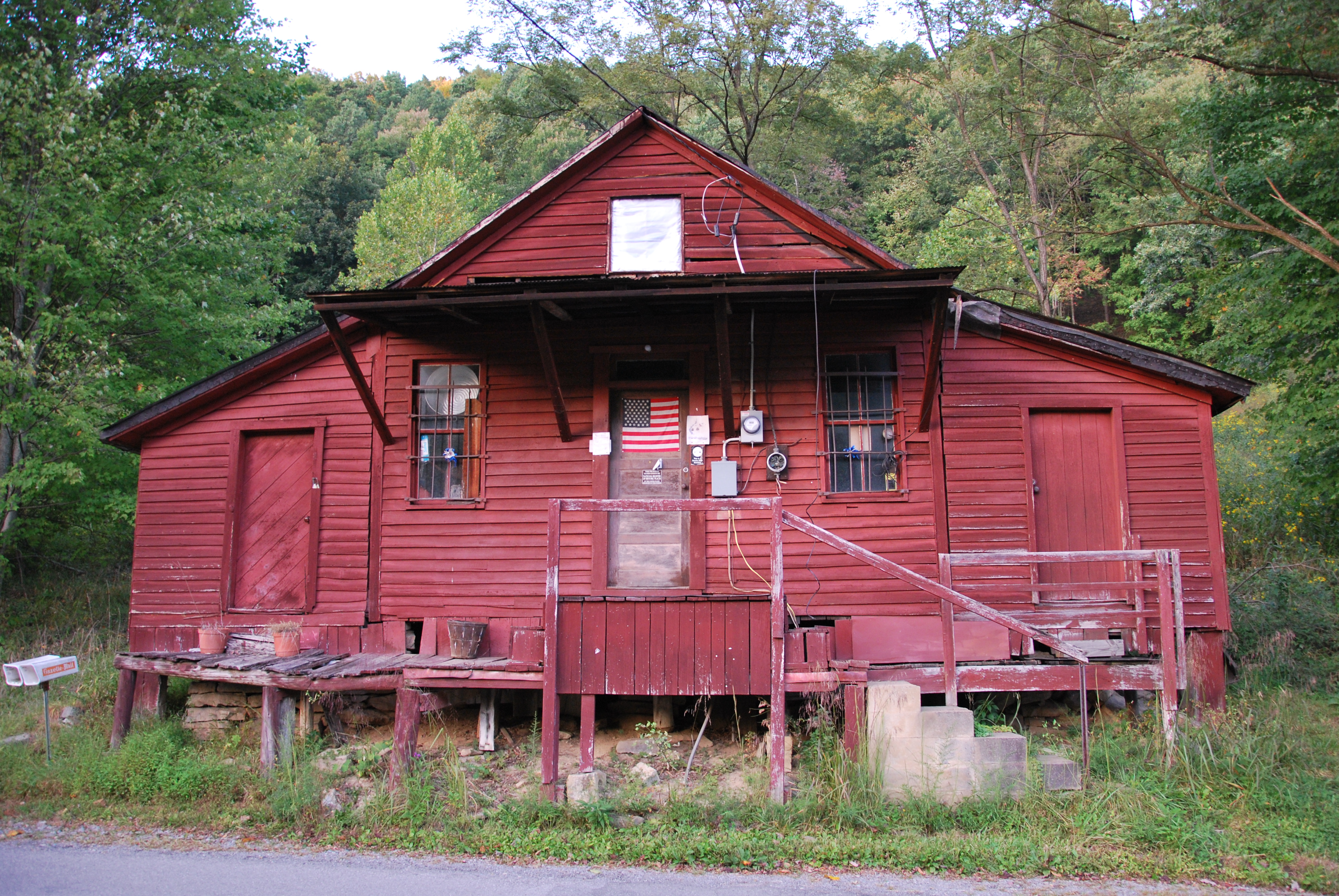
- Lowther Store, September 2010

- Location within West Virginia Location within the United States
- Location: 1793 Replete Road, near Wheeler, West Virginia
- Coordinates: 38°40′40″N 80°23′31″W
- Area: 1 acre (0.40 ha)
- Built: c. 1900
- Architect: Anderson, George Reuben
- NRHP reference No.: 97000264
- Added to NRHP: April 7, 1997

Lowther Store, also known as the John A. Hinkle and Son Store, is a historic general store located near Wheeler, Webster County, West Virginia. It was built about 1900 and expanded about 1910. The store is a one-story rectangular, wood-frame building with a foundation of field stones and posts. Also on the property are a frame coal house, and a storage building located across the roadway. It is the oldest continuous operating business in Webster County.

It was listed on the National Register of Historic Places in 1997.
