= Joost Van Nuyse House =

Historic house in Brooklyn, New York

- U.S. National Register of Historic Places
- New York State Register of Historic Places
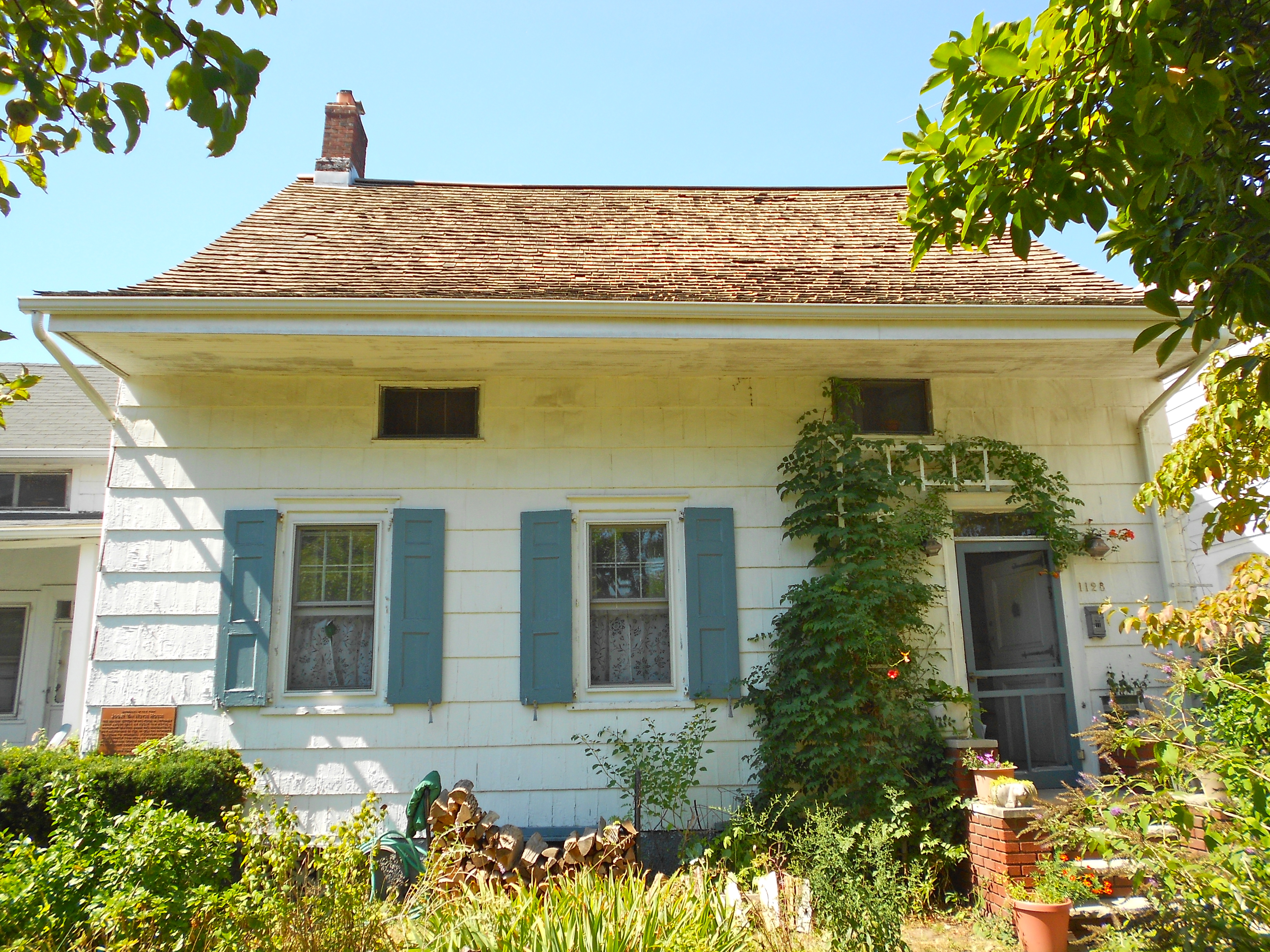
- Larger section, built c. 1795

- Location within New York City Location within New York Location within the United States
- Location: 1128 E. 34th St., Brooklyn, New York
- Coordinates: 40°37′41″N 73°56′38″W
- Area: less than one acre
- Built: 1744
- Architectural style: Colonial
- NRHP reference No.: 06000477
- NYSRHP No.: 04701.015769

Significant dates
- Added to NRHP: June 9, 2006
- Designated NYSRHP: April 20, 2006

Joost Van Nuyse House, also known as the Ditmas Coe House, is a historic home located in Flatlands, Brooklyn, New York City. The original section was built in 1744 and enlarged between 1793 and 1806. It was moved to its present site in 1925. It is a 1 1/2-story frame house with a steeply pitched flared roof.

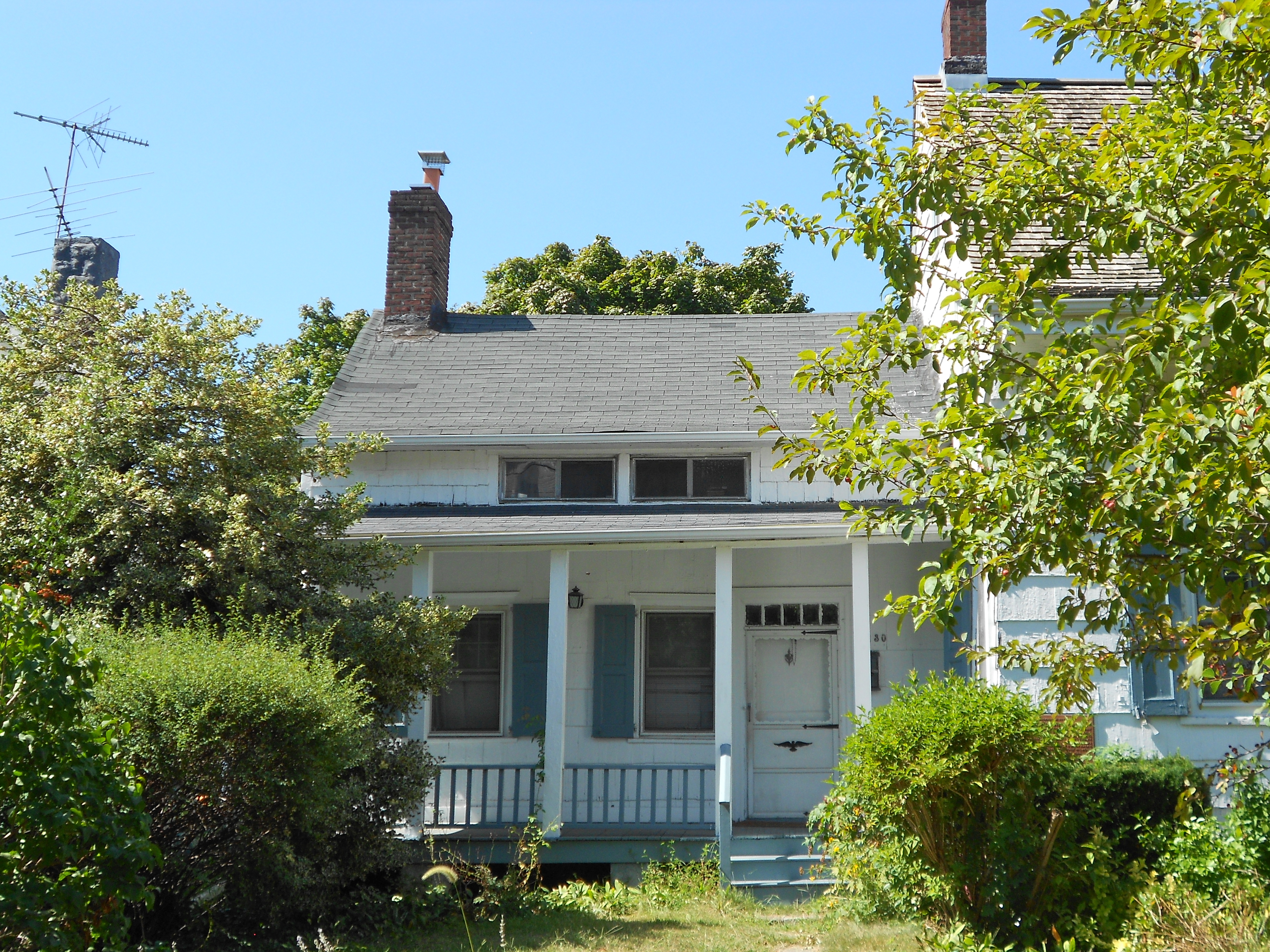
Smaller section, built c. 1744

It was listed on the National Register of Historic Places in 2006.

A report in 2020 added that this structure, now a private residence, is an "example of the Dutch Colonial farmhouse, and it is sometimes called the Ditmas Coe House or the Van Nuyse-Coe house, named after both the man suspected to have built the dwelling, Joost Van Nuyse, and Ditmas Coe, who rented the home in 1852".
