= Coe Swobe =

American politician

Member of the Nevada Assembly
- In office November 1962 – November 1966

Member of the Nevada Senate from the 1st district
- In office November 1966 – November 1974

Personal details
- Born: May 23, 1929 Reno, Nevada, U.S.
- Died: May 26, 2016 (aged 87)
- Party: Republican
- Spouse: Janey Quilici
- Profession: Attorney

Chester Coe Swobe (May 23, 1929 – May 26, 2016) was an American politician who was a Republican member of the Nevada General Assembly and Nevada Senate. An alumnus of the University of Nevada and University of Denver College of Law, he was an attorney.

Swobe died of liver failure at the age of 87.
