= Gypsy Camp Historic District =

- U.S. National Register of Historic Places
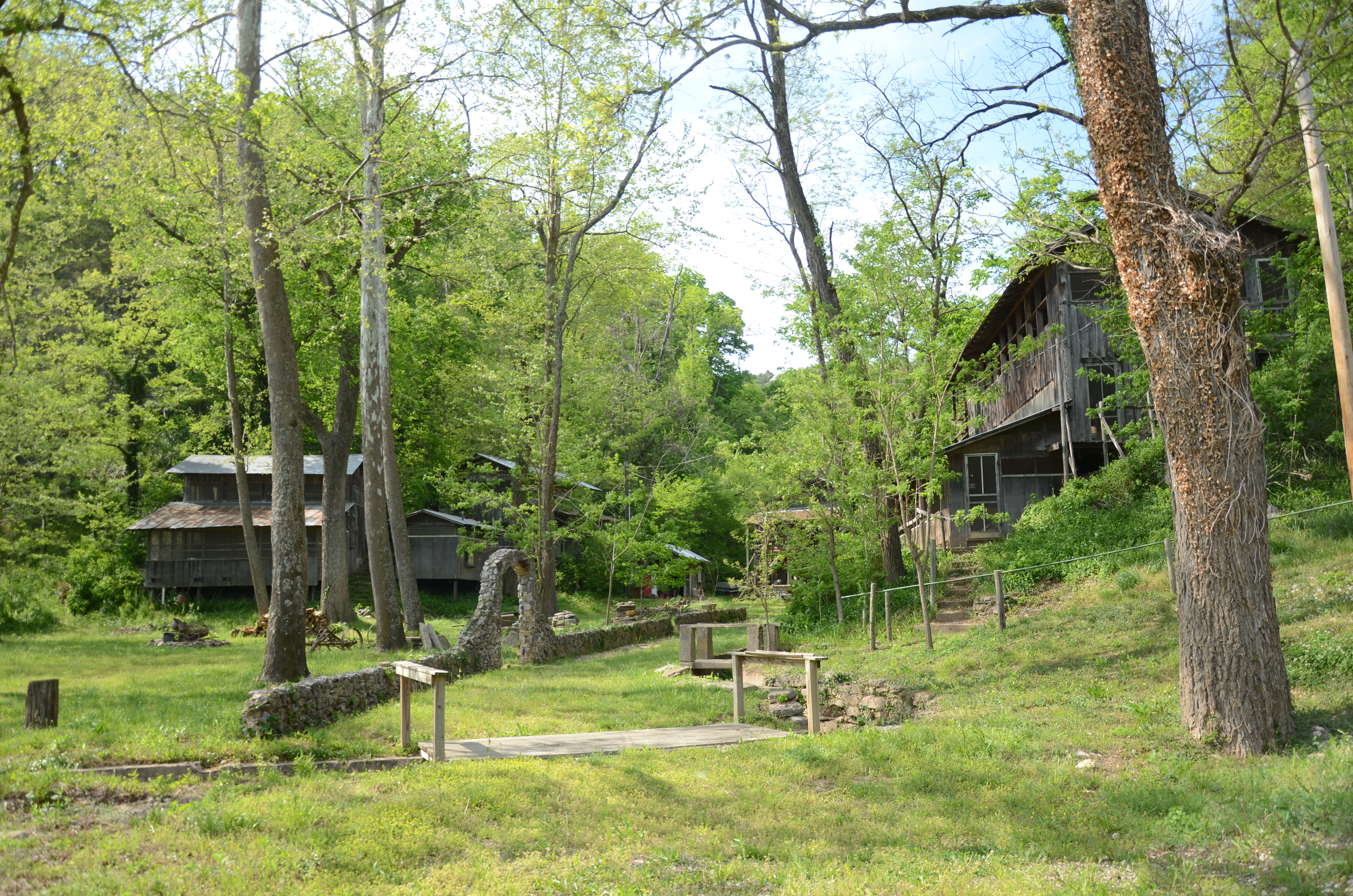
- Main common area of the camp

- Location within Arkansas Location within the United States
- Nearest city: Siloam Springs, Arkansas
- Coordinates: 36°6′44″N 94°32′15″W
- Area: 11.5 acres (4.7 ha)
- Built: 1921
- MPS: Benton County MRA
- NRHP reference No.: 87002425
- Added to NRHP: January 28, 1988

The Gypsy Camp Historic District encompasses a former summer camp facility in rural southwestern Benton County, Arkansas. It is located on the west side of Arkansas Highway 59, about 5 miles (8.0 km) south of Siloam Springs, on the north side of the Illinois River. The camp facilities were built in the 1920s for a girls summer camp, and are believed to be the only facilities built for that purpose in the state. The camp includes four cabins for campers, a dining/recreation hall, and three residential structures. All are finished with either pine slats or board-and-batten siding. There is a centrally located rock arbor and wall that provide an outside seating area. The camp operated from 1921 to 1978.

The camp was listed on the National Register of Historic Places in 1988.

In 2018, the site was purchased and now operates as Gypsy Camp & Canoe.
