= Laurel Run Rockshelter =

- U.S. National Register of Historic Places
- Nearest city: Coe, West Virginia
- Area: less than one acre
- MPS: Rockshelters on the Gauley Ranger District, Monongahela National Forest MPS
- NRHP reference No.: 93000491
- Added to NRHP: June 3, 1993

Laurel Run Rockshelter is a historic archaeological site located near Coe, Webster County, West Virginia. It is one of a number of prehistoric rock shelters on the Gauley Ranger District, Monongahela National Forest, that are known to have been utilized prehistorically from the Middle Archaic through the Late Woodland period, c. 6000 B.C.-1200 A.D. There are some indications that the Laurel Run rock shelter may have been utilized during the Early Archaic period, c. 8000-6000 B. C.

It was listed on the National Register of Historic Places in 1993.
