= Conjugated oligoelectrolytes =

Conjugated oligoelectrolytes, or COEs, are a class of synthetic antimicrobials designed to prevent and circumvent antimicrobial resistance via different mechanism of action than traditional antibiotics. COEs insert into cell membranes and can function as electron transporters, but were found to inhibit bacterial growth. They can also be used for tracking the progress of tumor growth.
