= Coe House (Burkesville, Kentucky) =

Historic house in Kentucky, United States

- U.S. National Register of Historic Places
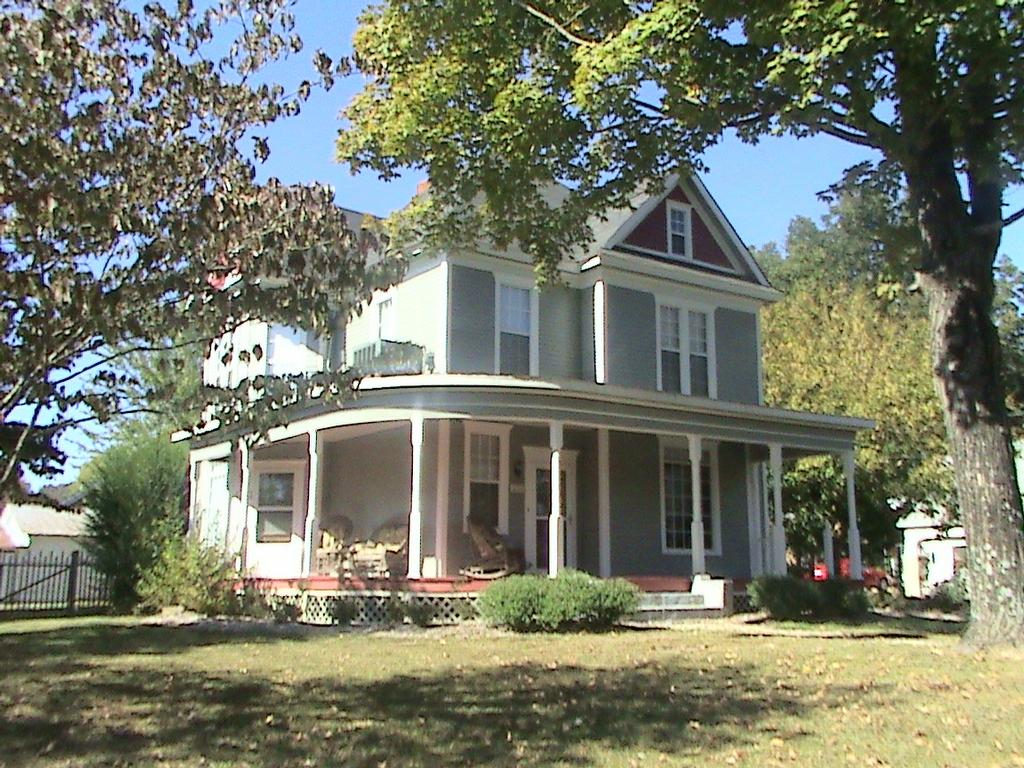

- Location within Kentucky Location within the United States
- Location: 433 N. Main St., Burkesville, Kentucky
- Coordinates: 36°47′48″N 85°21′59″W
- Area: less than one acre
- Built: 1908
- Architect: Williams, John; Cary, Albert
- Architectural style: Princess Anne
- NRHP reference No.: 09001138
- Added to NRHP: December 23, 2009

The Coe House in Burkesville, Kentucky, located at 433 N. Main St., was built in 1908. It was listed on the National Register of Historic Places in 2009.

In 2018 the house is on offer for sale, listed at $129,000. One bedroom has been open as a bed and breakfast, with the owner and family living in another part of the house.
