= Coes of Mytilene =

6th century BC Greek military commander of Mytilene

Coes was a Greek military commander of Mytilene. He supported King Darius Hystaspes of Persia in his Scythian expedition (c. 513 BC) as commander of the Mytilenaeans. Coes dissuaded the king from breaking up his bridge of boats over the Danube, and so cutting off his own retreat. For this good counsel, he was appointed by Darius on his return as the new tyrant of Mytilene.

In 499 BC, when the Ionians had been encouraged to revolt by Aristagoras, Coes, with several of the other tyrants, was seized by Aristagoras at Myus, where the Persian fleet that had been engaged at Naxos was lying. They were delivered up to the people of their cities. Most of them were allowed to go unhurt into exile other than Coes, who was stoned to death by the Mytileneans.
