= Holly River State Park =

State Park in Webster County, West Virginia

- IUCN category V (protected landscape/seascape)
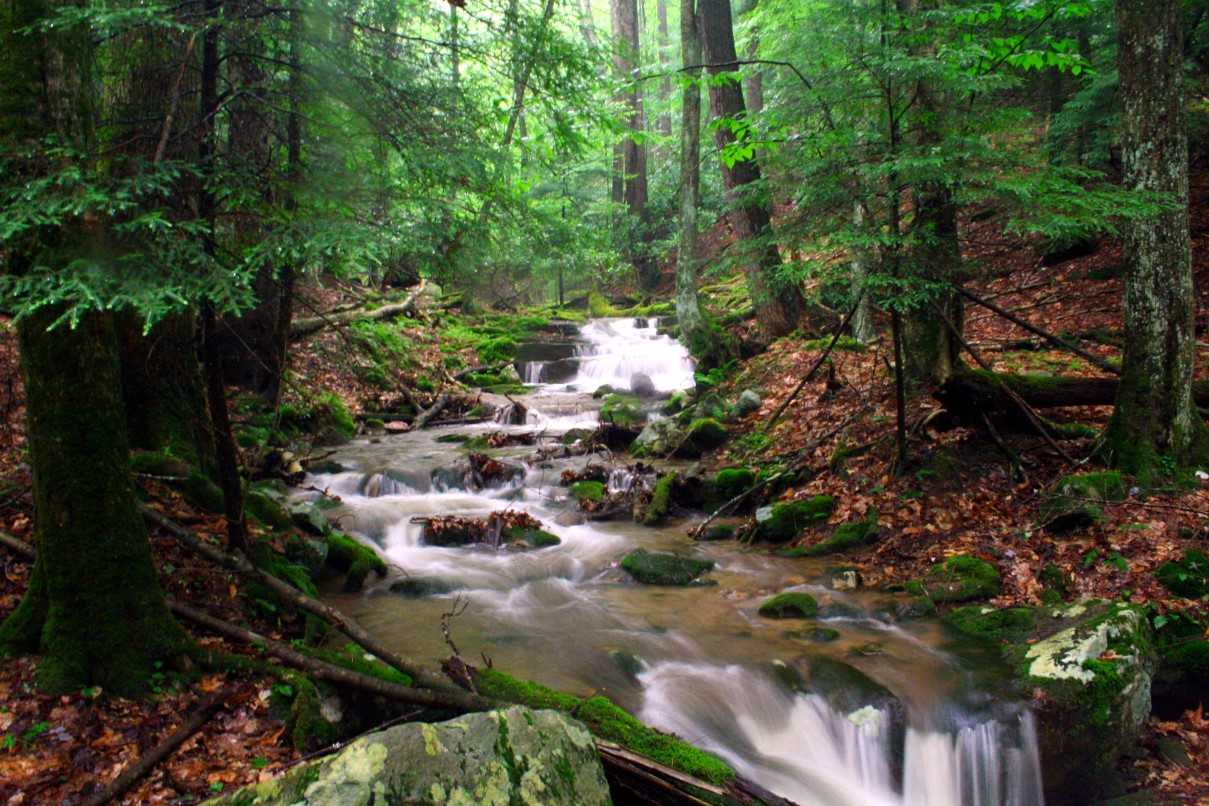
- Mountain run at Holly River

- Location within West Virginia
- Location: Webster, West Virginia, United States
- Nearest town: Hacker Valley, West Virginia
- Coordinates: 38°39′59″N 80°19′37″W
- Area: 8,294 acres (33.56 km^{2})
- Elevation: 2,467 ft (752 m)
- Established: 1938
- Named for: Holly River
- Governing body: West Virginia Division of Natural Resources
- Website: wvstateparks.com/park/holly-river-state-park/

Holly River State Park is a state park located in Webster County, West Virginia. Situated on the Left Fork of the Holly River near the town of Hacker Valley, it is the second largest park in the West Virginia state park system with a total of 8,294 acres (3,356 ha). The park features over 42 miles (68 km) of hiking trails, ten vacation cabins, an 88-unit campground, and many recreation and picnic areas.

== History ==
The creation of Holly River State Park began circa 1937 with the Farm Security Administration's Kanawha Head Project to resettle families from marginal farmland. 250 Works Progress Administration workers rehabilitated the land and constructed facilities in the project area. Holly River State Park was formed in 1938 when the West Virginia Conservation Commission took control of the area, and the state obtained ownership of the site in 1954.

== Recreation ==
Holly River features a seasonal swimming pool, a softball field, and courts for playing basketball, volleyball, tennis, and other popular activities. Special activities such as guided hikes, movie nights, and sporting events are offered during the summer.

=== Trails ===
Holly River has over 42 miles (68 km) of hiking and biking trails. Two trails, Ridge Road Trail and Rock Camp Trail, are designated as horse trails.

== Accommodations ==
=== Cabins ===
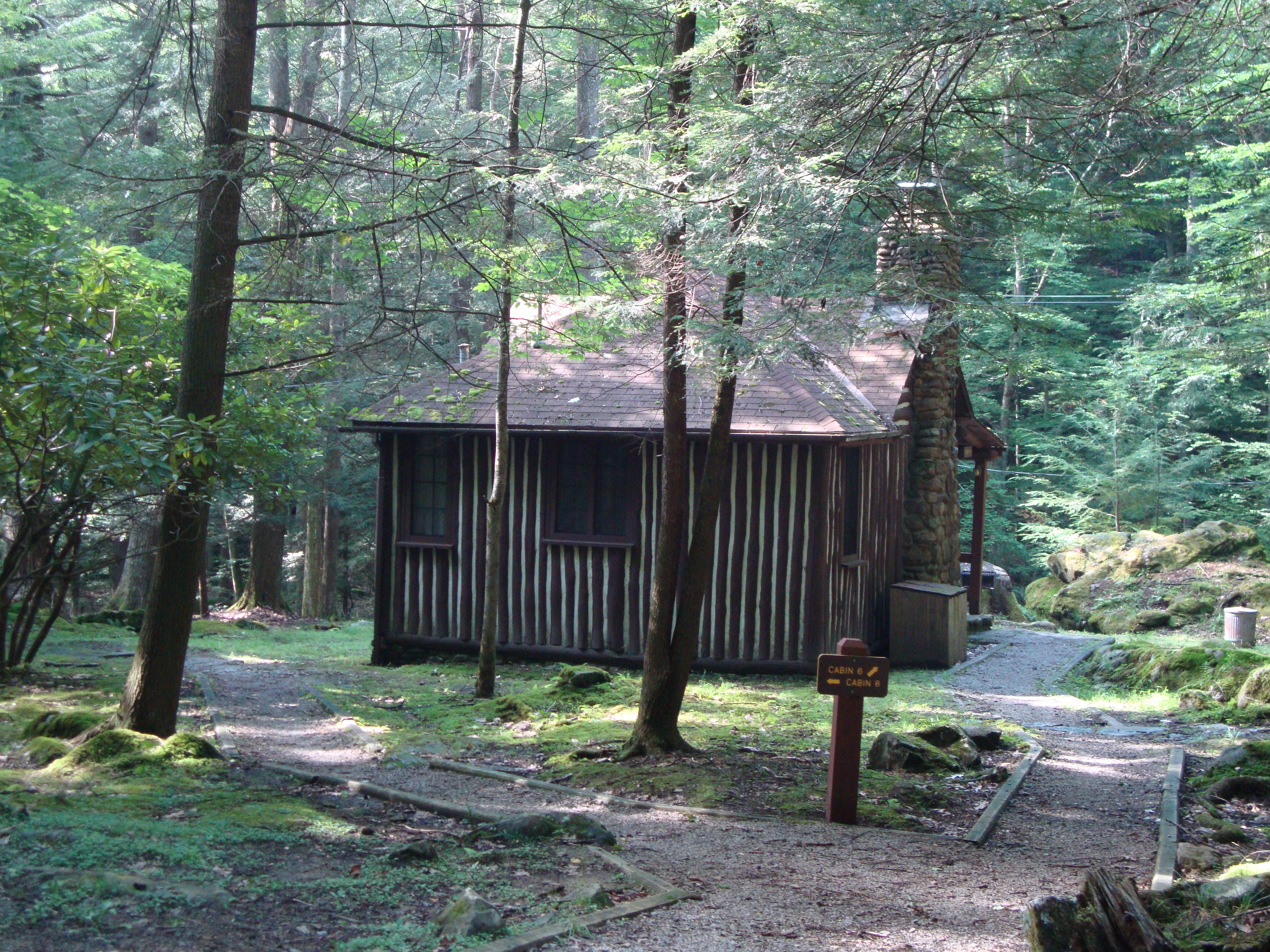
Cabin 6 at Holly River SP

Holly River features ten furnished cabins constructed in the 1930s using local natural stone and timber. Situated along a tributary of Laurel Fork Holly River, each cabin includes a stone fireplace.

=== Campgrounds ===
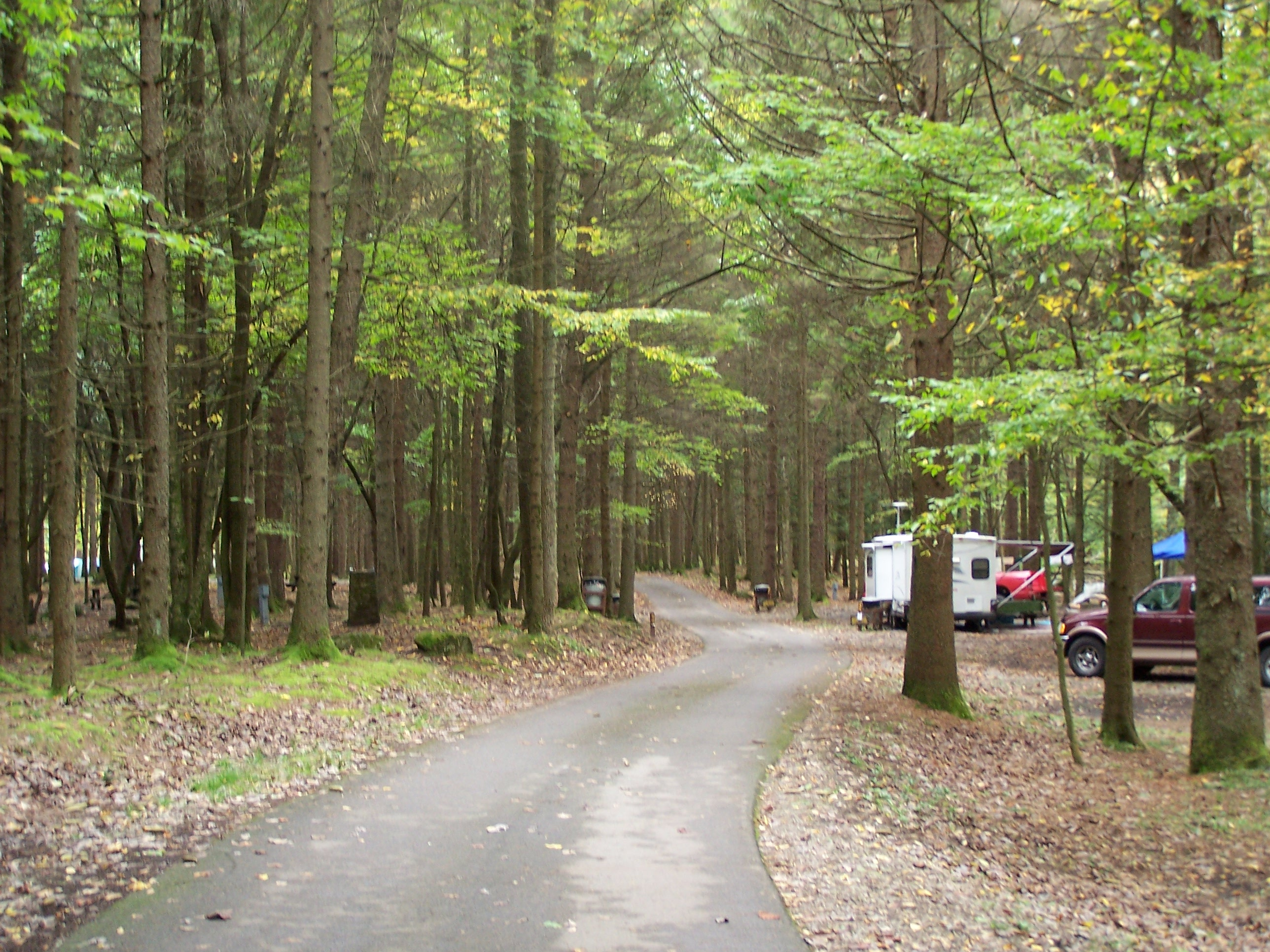
Spruce Area of campground

Holly River features a modern 88-unit campground that is open seasonally. Several campsites are designed to accommodate equestrian users and include access to corrals.

=== Store and restaurant ===
Holly River features a small on-site store providing staple groceries and sundries. A restaurant operated by a local concessionaire is also located in the park. It has been named one of the "101 Unique Places to Dine in West Virginia" several times.

== Attractions ==
=== Potato Knob ===
Located at 38°38′21″N 80°19′38″W

Located off Webster County Route 3 (Left Fork Holly River Road), Potato Knob is a popular attraction rising approximately 600 feet (180 m) above the surrounding terrain. Potato Knob Trail winds its way up the steep incline to the summit of the hill.

=== Upper Falls ===
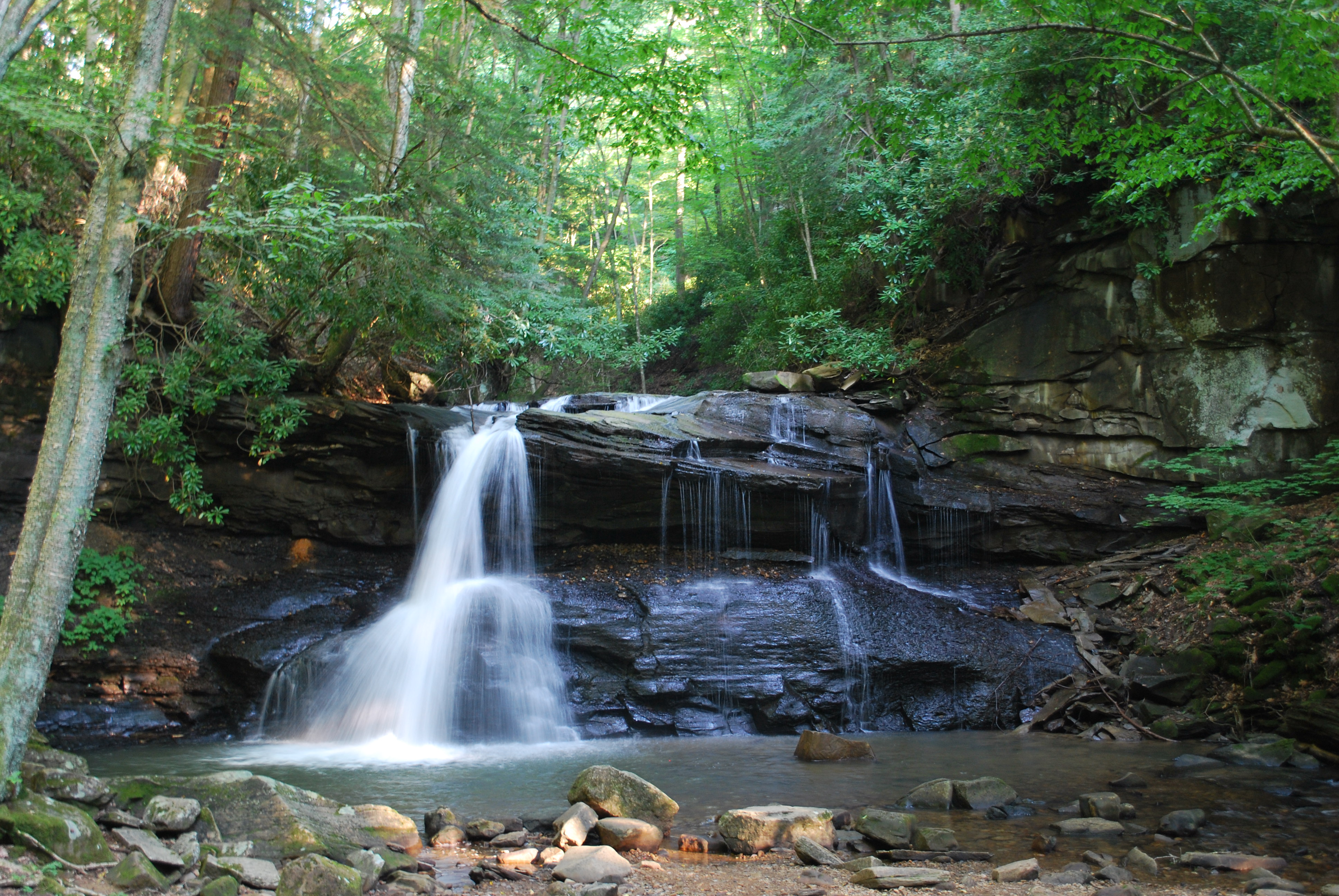

Located at 38°38′09″N 80°19′13″W

Located near Potato Knob is Upper Falls, a large waterfall on Fall Run. The site features an observation deck and stairway to the base of the falls.

=== Windy Gap School ===
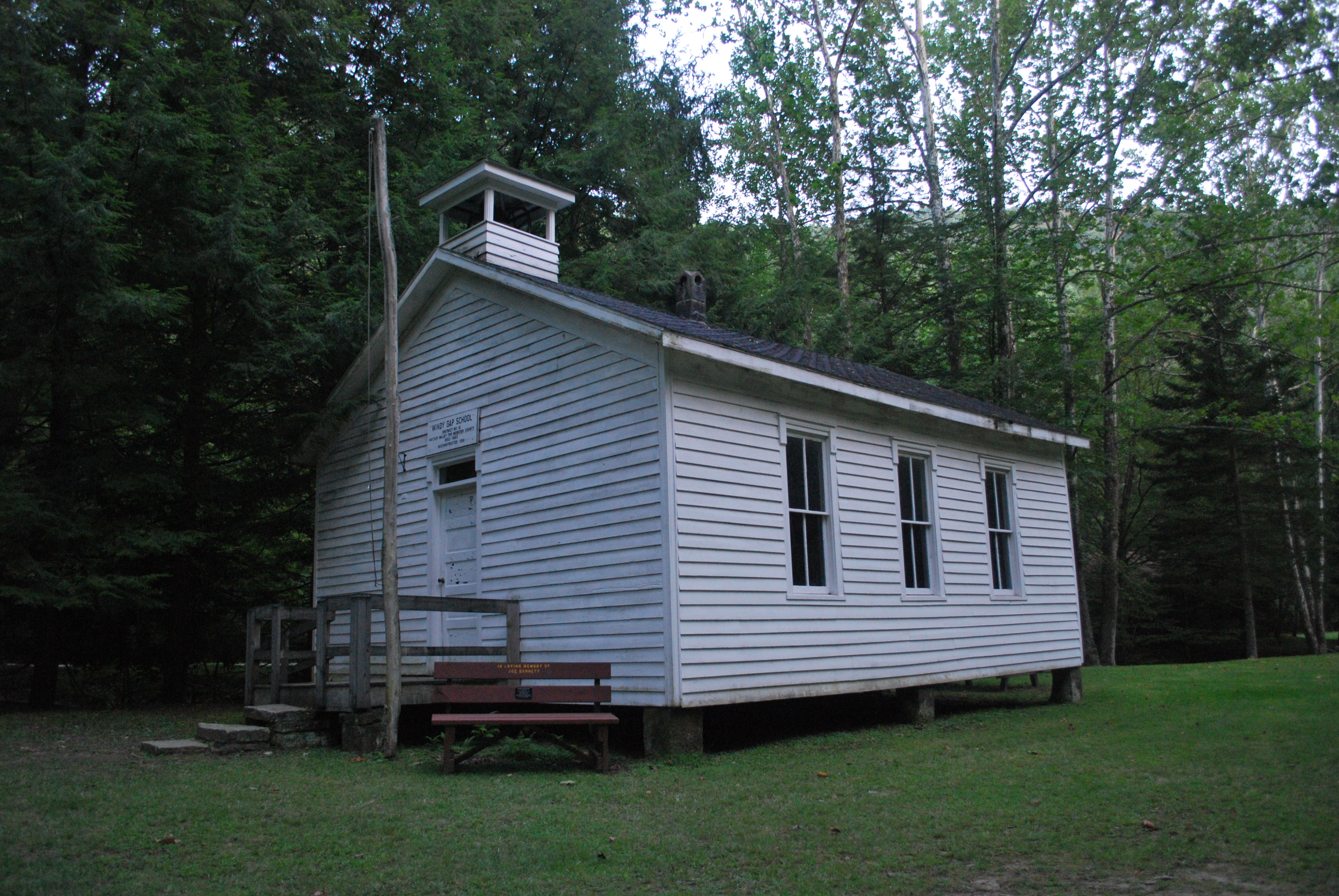

Located at 38°39′57″N 80°21′16″W

Windy Gap School is a former one-room schoolhouse that was located on a remote tract of land owned by the West Virginia Division of Natural Resources. The Holly River State Park Foundation led a volunteer project to relocate the schoolhouse to near the park headquarters to make it more accessible to visitors.

=== Tecumseh Falls ===
Located along the Reverie Trail, Tecumseh Falls was named after a Shawnee Native American prophet who predicted a solar eclipse. The falls drops 10 feet (3.0 m) from a rock ledge that overhangs the trail. It can be best seen during winter.

== Holly River Festival ==
The Holly River Festival has been held annually during Labor Day weekend at the park since 1992. The family-oriented festival features activities such as a talent show, live music, contests, crafts, old-time games, and exhibitions.

== Accessibility ==
Accessibility for the disabled was evaluated by West Virginia University in 2005. The campground, picnic shelters, swimming pool, and playground were found to be accessible, but issues were identified with signage and slippery stairways.

== See also ==
- List of West Virginia state parks
