= Coe, West Virginia =

Unincorporated community in West Virginia, United States

- Unincorporated community
- Location within West Virginia Location within the United States
- Coordinates: 38°19′33″N 80°33′16″W
- Country: United States
- State: West Virginia
- County: Nicholas
- Elevation: 2,749 ft (838 m)
- Time zone: UTC-5 (Eastern (EST))
  - Summer (DST): UTC-4 (EDT)
- Area codes: 304 & 681
- GNIS feature ID: 1550752

Coe is an unincorporated community in Nicholas County, West Virginia, United States. Coe is located on County Route 7/6, 5.4 miles (8.7 km) east of Craigsville.

The community was named after George T. Coe, the original owner of the town site. The Laurel Run Rockshelter was listed on the National Register of Historic Places in 1993.
