= Replete, West Virginia =

- Unincorporated community
- Location within West Virginia Location within the United States
- Coordinates: 38°42′02″N 80°27′50″W
- Country: United States
- State: West Virginia
- County: Webster
- Elevation: 1,742 ft (531 m)
- Time zone: UTC-5 (Eastern (EST))
  - Summer (DST): UTC-4 (EDT)
- Area codes: 304 & 681
- GNIS feature ID: 1555465

Replete is an unincorporated community in Webster County, West Virginia, United States. Replete is located on County Route 3, 15.7 miles (25.3 km) north-northwest of Webster Springs. Replete had a post office, which closed on January 21, 1989. An early variant name was Mount Pleasant.
