= Wildcat (disambiguation) =

Wildcats (Felis silvestris and Felis lybica) are small cats native to Europe, the western part of Asia, and Africa.

Wildcat or Wildcats may also refer to:

== Animals ==
- Wild cat, any species of cat in the taxonomic family Felidae excluding the domestic cat
  - Lynx species, sometimes known as wildcats
    - Bobcat (Lynx rufus), ranges from southern Canada to northern Mexico, including most of the continental United States
    - Canada lynx (Lynx canadensis), native to Canada, Alaska as well as some parts of the lower 48 United States
    - Eurasian lynx (Lynx lynx), native to European and Siberian forests
    - Iberian lynx (Lynx pardinus), native to the Iberian Peninsula in Southern Europe
  - Scottish wildcat (Felis silvestris sylvestris), subspecies of European wildcat
- Feral cat, a domestic cat which lives freely outdoors

== Arts and entertainment ==
=== Comic books and comic strips ===
- Wildcat (DC Comics), a name used by several DC Comics characters
- Wildcats (comics), a comic created by Jim Lee
- Wildcat (British comics), a British comic published by IPC Media
- Wildcat (comic strip), a comic strip by Donald Rooum
- Wildcat Comic Con, an annual fan convention held in Williamsport, Pennsylvania since 2012

=== Film, television, and theatre ===
- The Wildcat (1917 film)
- The Wildcat (1921 film), directed by Ernst Lubitsch
- The Wildcat (1936 film), a Spanish musical drama
- Wildcat (1942 film), a film starring Richard Arlen and Buster Crabbe
- Wildcat (musical), a 1960 Broadway musical
- Wildcat, a 1981 New Zealand film
- Wildcats (film), a 1986 film starring Goldie Hawn
- Wildcat (2022 film), a documentary film about animal rescue
- Wildcat (2023 film), a biographical film of American novelist Flannery O'Connor
- Wildcat (2025 film), a 2025 film starring Kate Beckinsale
- Wild C.A.T.s, a television series based on the Jim Lee comic
- Wildcat, a character in the Disney animated series TaleSpin
- Wildcats, a fictional basketball team in the High School Musical franchise
- "The Wildcats", V: The Series episode 15 (1985)

=== Music ===
- Wildcat (album), a 1989 album by Australian band Sunnyboys
- "Wildcat", a 1960 song by Gene Vincent
- "Wildcat", a 2006 song by Ratatat from Classics

=== Other uses in arts and entertainment ===
- WildCat (roller coaster), several amusement park rides
- "Wildcat" (short story), by Flannery O'Connor

== Military ==
- Grumman F4F Wildcat, an American World War II carrier fighter
- USS Wildcat, four US Navy ships named Wild Cat or Wildcat
- Wildcat APC, an armoured personnel carrier used in Israel
- AgustaWestland AW159 Wildcat, a British military helicopter introduced in 2014
- 81st Infantry Division (United States), nicknamed "Wildcat"
- VFA-131, a US Navy fighter squadron, nicknamed "Wildcats"
- 438 Tactical Helicopter Squadron of the Royal Canadian Air Force, nicknamed "Wildcats"

== People ==
=== Nickname ===
- Wildcat Monte, American boxer Monte Deadwiley (1905–1961)
- Lance C. Wade (1915–1944), American World War II ace with the Royal Air Force
- Wildcat Wilson (1901–1963), American college football player
- Larry Wilson (American football) (1938–2021)

=== Surname ===
- Tommy Wildcat (born 1967), Native American musician

=== Ring name ===
- Robbie Brookside (born 1966), British professional wrestler and trainer, known by the ring name "Wildcat"
- Chris Harris (wrestler) (born 1973), American professional wrestler, known by the ring name "Wildcat"

== Places ==
=== Canada ===
- Wildcat, Alberta, in Rocky View County, Alberta
- Wildcat 12, Queens County, Nova Scotia

=== United States ===
- Wildcat Township, Tipton County, Indiana
- Grayson, Oklahoma, formerly known as Wildcat
- Wildcat, West Virginia, an unincorporated community
- Wildcat Brook, in the White Mountains of New Hampshire
- Wildcat Canyon, Contra Costa County, California
- Wildcat Creek (disambiguation), multiple waterflows
- Wildcat Falls, Yosemite National Park, California
- Wildcat Hills, Nebraska
- Wildcat Hollow, Connecticut, in Litchfield County
- Wildcat Marsh, Contra Costa County, California
- Wildcat Mountain (disambiguation), multiple summits

=== Outer space ===
- 17493 Wildcat, an asteroid

== Sports ==
=== Teams ===
==== Canada ====
- Edmonton Wildcats, a Canadian football team based in Edmonton, Alberta
- Hamilton Wildcats (Canadian football), a defunct Canadian football team based in Hamilton, Ontario
- Hamilton Wildcats (Australian football), an amateur Australian rules football club based in Hamilton, Ontario
- London Wildcats (1994–1995), a professional ice hockey team in the Colonial Hockey League, moved to Dayton, Ohio and renamed
- Moncton Wildcats, a franchise in the Quebec Major Junior Hockey League, based in Moncton, New Brunswick
- Monkton Wildcats, a WOAA Senior Hockey League hockey team based in Monkton, Ontario
- St. Thomas Wildcats (1991–1993), a professional ice hockey team in the Colonial Hockey League, relocated and renamed the London Wildcats (see above)
- Valley Wildcats, a junior ice hockey franchise from the Annapolis Valley region of Nova Scotia

==== United Kingdom ====
- Durham Wildcats, a basketball team based in Newton Aycliffe, County Durham
- Kingston Wildcats, an English Basketball League team
- Swindon Wildcats, a UK professional ice hockey team
- Wakefield Trinity Wildcats, an English rugby league team
- Weymouth Wildcats (1954-2010), a British motorcycle speedway team based in Weymouth, England
- West London Wildcats, an Australian rules football and netball club based in London, England
- Newcastle Wildcats, the ice hockey team of Newcastle University, England

==== United States ====
- Abilene Christian Wildcats, the sports teams of Abilene Christian University
- Arizona Wildcats, the sports teams of the University of Arizona
- Arkansas Wildcats, a team of the Women's Football Alliance
- Atlanta Wildcats, an American Basketball Association team
- Bethune–Cookman Wildcats, the sports teams of Bethune–Cookman University
- Central Washington Wildcats, the sports teams of Central Washington University
- Colorado Wildcats (1998), a team in the Professional Indoor Football League
- Connecticut Wildcats, a rugby league team in the USA Rugby League
- Daemen Wildcats, the sports teams of Daemen University
- Davidson Wildcats, the sports teams of Davidson College
- Hershey Wildcats (1997–2001), a professional soccer team in the USL A-League, based in Hershey, Pennsylvania
- Jackson Wildcats (2002–2007), a United States Basketball League team based in Jackson, Mississippi
- Kansas State Wildcats, the sports teams of Kansas State University
- Kentucky Wildcats, the sports teams of the University of Kentucky
- Los Angeles Wildcats (AFL) (1926), an American Football League team (actually based in Chicago)
- Los Angeles Wildcats (XFL) (2020), an XFL team
- Mahoning Valley Wildcats, a defunct International Basketball League team based in Struthers, Ohio, removed from the IBL schedule in early 2006
- Minnesota Wildcats (2008–2011), a Tier III Jr. An ice hockey team playing in the Minnesota Junior Hockey League
- New Hampshire Wildcats, the sports teams of the University of New Hampshire
- New Jersey Wildcats, a women's United Soccer Leagues W-League team
- New Mexico Wildcats (2008–2009), an American Indoor Football Association team
- Northwestern Wildcats, the sports teams of Northwestern University
- Richmond Wildcats, a minor ice hockey team based in Richmond, Virginia
- Rose City Wildcats (2010), a Women's Spring Football League team that was based in Portland, Oregon
- San Diego Wildcats (2006–2009), a team in the American Basketball Association
- Savannah Wildcats, a charter member of the Continental Basketball League, based in Savannah, Georgia
- South Georgia Wildcats (2002–2009), a professional arena football team
- Villanova Wildcats, the sports teams of Villanova University
- Weber State Wildcats, the sports teams of Weber State University
- West Virginia Wildcatz, an American Basketball Association team based in Fairmont, West Virginia
- Wheeling Wildcats (2008–2009), a professional indoor football team in Wheeling, West Virginia
- Wichita Falls Wildcats, a Tier II Junior A ice hockey team in the North American Hockey League

==== Other countries ====
- CIT-U Wildcats, the sports teams of the Cebu Institute of Technology–University in Cebu City, Philippines
- Maastricht Wildcats, an amateur American football team based in Maastricht, The Netherlands
- Papatoetoe Wildcats, an American football club established in 1986 in South Auckland, New Zealand
- Perth Wildcats, an Australian basketball team in the National Basketball League
- Wolfenbüttel Wildcats, a defunct German women's basketball team dissolved in 2013

=== School mascots ===
- El Dorado High School (Arkansas)
- Baker County High School (Glen St. Mary, Florida)
- Hazelwood West High School, Hazelwood, Missouri

=== Other uses in sport ===
- Wildcat formation, an American football offensive scheme
- Wildcat Stadium, various sports stadiums in the US

== Vehicles ==
- Bowler Wildcat, an off-road racing vehicle
- Buick Wildcat, an automobile
- Melling Wildcat, a high-performance British sports car
- Daihatsu Taft (F10), an automobile sold as the Wildcat in Australia
- Hobie Wildcat, a catamaran
- USC&GS Wildcat (1919), a launch in commission with the US Coast and Geodetic Survey from 1919 to 1941
- Sabre Wildcat, an American ultralight aircraft

== Other uses ==
- The Wildcat Cafe, Yellowknife, Northwest Territories, Canada
- Wildcat! BBS, a bulletin board system software package
- Wildcat cartridge, a specialty firearm cartridge not produced by commercial ammunition manufacturers
- Arizona Daily Wildcat, University of Arizona student newspaper
- Wildcat (anarchist newspaper), a London-based monthly published from 1974 to 1975
- Wildcat, a sprocketed wheel for an anchor chain; see anchor windlass

== See also ==
- Wildcat! Wildcat!, an American band
- Wild Cat (disambiguation)
- Wildcat strike action, a strike action of workers that is not authorized by union leadership
- Wildcat banking, the issuance of currency by private banks in the antebellum United States
- Wildcatter, a person who drills for oil in areas not yet known to have oil fields
