= Wildcat Creek =

Wildcat Creek may refer to:

- Wildcat Creek (California)
- Wildcat Creek (Indiana)
- Wildcat Creek (Kansas River tributary), a stream in Kansas
- Wildcat Creek (Munkers Creek tributary), a stream in Kansas
- Wildcat Creek (West Branch Whitewater River tributary), a stream in Kansas
- Wildcat Creek, Kentucky, a tributary of Goose Creek (Oneida, Kentucky)
- Wildcat Creek (Minnesota)
- Wildcat Creek (Grand River tributary), a stream in Missouri
- Wildcat Creek (Wachita Creek), a stream in Missouri
- Wildcat Creek (Lackawanna River), in Lackawanna County, Pennsylvania
- Wildcat Creek (Siuslaw River), Lane County, Oregon
- Wildcat Creek (Beaver County, Utah)
