= West Virginia Wildcats =

West Virginia Wildcats may refer to:

- West Virginia Wildcats, former name of Herd That, a basketball team that competes in The Basketball Tournament
- West Virginia Wildcatz, a team of the semi-professional American Basketball Association
- West Virginia WildKats, a team of the Women's Spring Football League
- Wildcat, West Virginia, an unincorporated community in Lewis County

== See also ==
- Wheeling Wildcats, a defunct professional indoor football team located in Wheeling, West Virginia
- Wildcat (disambiguation)
