= Wild Cat =

Wild Cat may refer to:

== Music ==
- Wild Cat (Danko Jones album), 2017
- Wild Cat (Tygers of Pan Tang album), 1980
- "Wild Cat" (song), a 1927 instrumental duet for violin and guitar

== Places ==
- Wild Cat Hill, a summit in Missouri, USA
- Wild Cat Township, Elk County, Kansas, township in Kansas, USA

== Other uses ==
- Wild Cat (Seminole) (died 1857), leading chieftain during the Second Seminole War
- USS Wild Cat (1862), a Confederate schooner captured by the Union Navy
- Wild Cat (boat), a fictional schooner in Arthur Ransome's novels Peter Duck and Missee Lee
- Wild Cat (Hersheypark), a wooden roller coaster in Hershey, Pennsylvania, USA

== See also ==
- Wild Cat Bluff, Texas, a ghost town in Texas, USA
- Wildcat (disambiguation)
