= Judge James =

Judge James may refer to:

- Albert E. James (c. 1892–1952), judge of the United States Board of Tax Appeals
- Arthur James (judge) (1916–1976), English Court of Appeal judge
- Edward James (judge) (1757–1841), judge of the Inferior Court of Common Pleas of Nova Scotia
- Robert G. James (born 1946), judge of the United States District Court for the Western District of Louisiana
- William P. James (1870–1940), judge of the United States District Court for the Southern District of California

== See also ==
- Justice James (disambiguation)
