= UCL Yetis =

University ice hockey club at University College London

- City: London, England
- League: British Universities Ice Hockey Association (BUIHA)
- Division: Checking Division 1 South (from 2026–27)
- Founded: 2006
- Home arena: Streatham Ice Rink
- Colours: Sky blue, purple, white
- Website: studentsunionucl.org/clubs-societies/ice-club

The UCL Yetis are a student ice hockey club at University College London (UCL) in London, England. Founded in 2006, the club is affiliated with the Students' Union UCL and competes in the British Universities Ice Hockey Association (BUIHA). It fields three teams at different experience levels. Their annual match against the Imperial College Devils, known as the London Ice Varsity, hosts over 600 spectators each year.

== History ==
The UCL Yetis joined the British Universities Ice Hockey Association in 2011. The A team entered divisional play and rose through the divisions, winning the Division 3 title in 2012–13, the club's first championship.

In 2014–15 the A team won the BUIHA Division 2 title and the Tier 2 National Championship in the same season, then won Division 2 again in 2016–17.

In 2025–26 the A team went unbeaten through Checking Division 2 South, winning all six games with a goal difference of +80 to take the title and earn promotion to Checking Division 1 South for 2026–27. Ayush Lohia led the division in points (29) and goals (16); Ivan Taradin led in assists (18).

== Club structure ==
The club runs three teams at different experience levels.

=== A Team ===
The A team is the club's top squad. After winning the Checking Division 2 South title unbeaten in 2025–26, the team moves to Checking Division 1 South in 2026–27. They also won the BUIHA Division 2 title in 2014–15 and 2016–17, and the Tier 2 National Championship in 2014–15.

=== B Team ===
The B team (known informally as the "Betis") takes players with moderate experience and those coming up through the C team. The Betis won the BUIHA Division 2 Non-Checking title in 2015–16 and the Tier IV National Championship in 2019.

=== C Team ===
The C team (known informally as the "Cetis") is open to complete beginners and those returning to the sport. It competes against other London university teams and is the club's main entry point for new players. The Cetis won the Tier 4 National Championship in 2021–22.

== Club leadership ==
The following positions are current as of the 2025–26 season.

Role	Name
Club President	James Newbold-Comyns
Fixtures Secretary	James Newbold-Comyns
Treasurer	Marvin Hsu
A Team Captain	Quinn Clubb
A Team Alternate Captain	Svatoslav Outulný
A Team Alternate Captain	Marvin Hsu
B Team Captain	Sophia Wigmore-Lopez
C Team Captain	Fin Ross

== Facilities ==
All teams train at Streatham Ice Rink in South London on Wednesday afternoons (13:45–15:45).

== London Ice Varsity ==
The London Ice Varsity is an annual ice hockey match between the UCL Yetis and the Imperial College Devils. It was first played in 2013 at Brixton Ice Rink, after both clubs were placed in the same BUIHA division.The match has since moved to Streatham Ice Rink, which both clubs use as their home rink, which has a capacity of over 600 spectators each year.

In 2014 the Yetis lost the match in a sudden-death penalty shootout. Imperial won the 2019 edition 6–3. UCL covered the 2017 match on its official news channel.

The Yetis won the 2024–25 edition in a shootout. The 2025–26 fixture is to be on 13 March 2026. There is a figure skating performance during every intermission: UCL Frostbite, the KCL Wolves, and the Imperial College figure skating team historically perform during intermissions.

Season	Date	UCL	Imperial	Notes
2012–13	1 Mar 2013	3	7	
2013–14	28 Feb 2014	4	4	Imperial won shootout
2014–15	20 Mar 2015	4	2	
2015–16	18 Mar 2016	9	2	
2016–17	3 Mar 2017	3	6	
2017–18	2 Mar 2018	3	10	
2018–19	1 Mar 2019	—	—	No result recorded
2019–20	—	—	—	Cancelled (COVID-19)
2020–21	—	—	—	No fixture
2021–22	18 Mar 2022	3	5	
2022–23	10 Mar 2023	8	6	
2023–24	15 Mar 2024	4	9	
2024–25	7 Mar 2025	4	4	UCL won shootout
2025–26	13 Mar 2026	TBD	TBD	Scheduled 13 March 2026

== Team records ==
=== A Team season-by-season ===
The following table records the performance of the UCL Yetis A Team in BUIHA league and cup competition.

Season	Division	GP	W	L	T	GD	Pts	Finish
2012–13	Checking 3 South	6	5	1	0	+40	10	1st
2013–14	Checking 2 South	10	4	5	1	–1	9	4th
2014–15	Checking 2 South	8	5	3	0	+21	10	1st
2015–16	Checking 1 South	8	1	6	1	–26	3	5th
2016–17	Checking 2 South	8	7	1	0	+57	14	1st
2017–18	Checking 1 South	8	0	8	0	–130	0	5th
2018–19	Checking 2 South	6	0	6	0	–39	0	4th
2019–20	Checking 2 South	7	2	5	0	–4	4	4th
2022–23	Checking 1 South	10	4	6	0	–97	8	5th
2023–24	Checking 1 South	6	0	6	0	–59	0	4th
2024–25	Checking 1 South	8	1	7	0	–35	–10 (Note: UCL were deducted 12 points for administrative reasons.)	5th
2025–26	Checking 2 South	6	6	0	0	+80	12	1st

=== B Team season-by-season ===
Season	Division	GP	W	L	T	GD	Pts	Finish
2015–16	Non-Checking 2 South	8	8	0	0	+86	16	1st
2016–17	Non-Checking 1 South	8	5	3	0	+19	10	2nd
2017–18	Non-Checking 1 South	8	0	8	0	–175	0	5th
2018–19	Non-Checking 2 South	10	6	4	0	+49	12	3rd
2019–20	Non-Checking 1 South	9	4	5	0	–15	8	4th
2022–23	Non-Checking 2 South	6	0	6	0	–65	0	4th
2023–24	Non-Checking 2 South	12	0	12	0	–142	0	7th
2024–25	Non-Checking 2 South	12	4	8	0	–27	2 (Note: UCL B were deducted 6 points for administrative reasons.)	6th
2025–26	Non-Checking 3 South	6	3	3	0	+5	6	3rd

=== C Team season-by-season ===
Season	Division	GP	W	L	T	GD	Pts	Finish
2017–18	Non-Checking 3 South	8	1	6	1	–68	3	5th
2018–19	Non-Checking 3 South	9	0	9	0	–145	0	10th
2019–20	Non-Checking 3 South	6	0	3	3	–11	3	4th

== Honours ==
The Yetis compete annually in the BUIHA National Championships held at iceSheffield. The club has won three national titles across different tiers.

=== A Team ===
- BUIHA Checking 3 South Champions: 2012–13
- BUIHA Checking 2 South Champions: 2014–15, 2016–17, 2025–26 (undefeated, 6W–0L)
- BUIHA Tier 2 Nationals Champions: 2014–15

=== B Team ===
- BUIHA Non-Checking 2 South Champions: 2015–16
- BUIHA Tier IV Nationals Champions: 2018–19

=== C Team ===
- BUIHA Tier IV Nationals Champions: 2021–22

== Statistics ==
All statistics are sourced from the British Universities Ice Hockey Association. Figures represent Cup Competition totals only. Challenge, Varsity, and Nationals games are excluded.

=== All-time leaders ===
==== A Team ====
Category	Player	Value
Points	Guido De Boer	83
Goals	Guido De Boer	52
Assists	Chris Fox	36
PIM	Mark Ongemakh	70
PPG (min. 10 GP)	Guido De Boer	3.95

Top 5 all-time points scorers (A Team):

Rank	Player	GP	G	A	PTS	PPG
1	Guido De Boer	21	52	31	83	3.95
2	Chris Fox	23	33	36	69	3.00
3	Mark Ongemakh	24	27	12	39	1.63
4	David Persson	13	23	11	34	2.62
5	Ruslan Ponomarev	23	14	18	32	1.39

==== B Team ====
Category	Player	Value
Points	Leroy Hung	44
Goals	Leroy Hung	28
Assists	Philip Edwards / Leroy Hung	16
PIM	Charles Olley	40
PPG (min. 10 GP)	Leroy Hung	2.93

Top 5 all-time points scorers (B Team):

Rank	Player	GP	G	A	PTS	PPG
1	Leroy Hung	15	28	16	44	2.93
2	Charles Olley	20	24	14	38	1.90
3	Lawrence Yolland	14	24	11	35	2.50
4	Modaser Anwary	17	24	9	33	1.94
5	Philip Edwards	8	13	16	29	3.63

==== C Team ====
Category	Player	Value
Points	Matthias David	8
Goals	Matthias David / Ben Freeman / David Kubánek	6
Assists	Oliver Cole	4
PIM	William Watson	18
PPG	Ben Freeman	1.75

Top 5 all-time points scorers (C Team):

Rank	Player	GP	G	A	PTS	PPG
1	Matthias David	8	6	2	8	1.00
2	Ben Freeman	4	6	1	7	1.75
3	David Kubánek	5	6	1	7	1.40
4	Marcus Chow	6	5	1	6	1.00
5	Victoria Heyes	8	1	3	4	0.50

=== Single-season records ===
==== A Team ====
Category	Player	Value	Season
Points	Guido De Boer	48	2016–17
Goals	Guido De Boer	29	2016–17
Assists	Marvin Hsu	21	2025–26
PIM	Mark Ongemakh	40	2013–14
PPG	Guido De Boer	6.86	2016–17

==== B Team ====
Category	Player	Value	Season
Points	Philip Edwards	29	2015–16
Goals	Lawrence Yolland / Modaser Anwary	16	2015–16, 2018–19
Assists	Philip Edwards	16	2015–16
PIM	Charles Olley	34	2019–20
PPG	Philip Edwards	3.63	2015–16

==== C Team ====
Category	Player	Value	Season
Points	Matthias David	8	2017–18
Goals	Matthias David / Ben Freeman / David Kubánek	6	2017–18, 2018–19
Assists	Victoria Heyes	3	2017–18
PIM	William Watson	18	2019–20
PPG	Ben Freeman	1.75	2017–18

=== Season-by-season leaders ===
==== A Team ====
Season	Points leader	Goals leader	Assists leader	PPG leader	PIM leader
2025–26	Ayush Lohia (29)	Ayush Lohia (16)	Marvin Hsu (21)	Ayush Lohia (4.83)	Marvin Hsu / Svatoslav Outulný (14)
2024–25	Kevin Barlow (5)	Kevin Barlow / Maximilian Livshin (4)	Svatoslav Outulný (4)	Svatoslav Outulný / Georges Schmitz (0.67)	Quinn Clubb (24)
2023–24	Kevin Ji / Kosei Satoh (5)	Kevin Ji (3)	Kosei Satoh (4)	Kevin Ji / Kosei Satoh (0.83)	Quinn Clubb (8)
2022–23	Morgan Wark (19)	Morgan Wark (15)	Maxwell Schipperheijn (6)	Morgan Wark (2.71)	Travis Campbell (27)
2019–20	Harry Blake (23)	Harry Blake (15)	Aleksandrs Jekabsons (10)	Harry Blake (3.29)	Aleksandrs Jekabsons (18)
2018–19	Aleksandrs Jekabsons (5)	Aleksandrs Jekabsons (5)	Umar Saleem (2)	Aleksandrs Jekabsons (0.83)	Aleksandrs Jekabsons (38)
2017–18	David Persson (3)	Aleksandrs Jekabsons (2)	David Persson (2)	Hanna Åström (0.50)	Simon Kunin (12)
2016–17	Guido De Boer (48)	Guido De Boer (29)	Chris Fox (18)	Guido De Boer (6.86)	Guido De Boer (35)
2015–16	Maxime Tremblay (9)	Chris Fox (4)	Maxime Tremblay (6)	Maxime Tremblay (1.13)	Maxime Tremblay (30)
2014–15	Chris Fox (24)	Guido De Boer (15)	Chris Fox (14)	Chris Fox (4.00)	Ruslan Ponomarev (33)
2013–14	Mark Ongemakh (19)	Mark Ongemakh (16)	Ruslan Ponomarev / Guido De Boer (6)	Guido De Boer (2.00)	Mark Ongemakh (40)
2012–13	Maxim Kozlov (22)	Maxim Kozlov (18)	Timothy Wong / Ruslan Ponomarev (7)	Maxim Kozlov (5.50)	Erik Scalfaro (22)

==== B Team ====
Season	Points leader	Goals leader	Assists leader	PPG leader	PIM leader
2025–26	Leonard Lui (9)	Leonard Lui (7)	Alex Tam / Leo Saiu-Bell (3)	Leonard Lui (1.80)	Ivan Shalashilin (24)
2024–25	Jeremy Au-Yeung (21)	Jeremy Au-Yeung (19)	Alex Wainwright (7)	Jeremy Au-Yeung (2.10)	Ruien Li / Abbey Li (4)
2023–24	Jack Donovan (9)	Jack Donovan (7)	Alex Wainwright (3)	Karri Heikkinen (1.00)	Harvey Chadderton (12)
2022–23	Gigi Laflamme / Karri Heikkinen (1)	Gigi Laflamme (1)	Karri Heikkinen (1)	Gigi Laflamme / Karri Heikkinen (1.00)	—
2019–20	Leroy Hung (18)	Leroy Hung (13)	Leroy Hung (5)	Leroy Hung (2.57)	Charles Olley (34)
2018–19	Charles Olley (27)	Modaser Anwary (16)	Charles Olley (13)	Leroy Hung (3.25)	David Kubánek (12)
2017–18	Charles Olley (4)	Charles Olley (4)	Keshav Iyengar / Joseph Lee (1)	Philip Marshall-Lockyer (1.00)	Rory Hughes (10)
2016–17	Lawrence Yolland / Nick Reilly (12)	Nick Reilly (9)	Lawrence Yolland / Jack Caswell (4)	Lawrence Yolland (1.71)	Jack Caswell (12)
2015–16	Philip Edwards (29)	Lawrence Yolland (16)	Philip Edwards (16)	Philip Edwards (3.63)	Keir Ovington (20)

==== C Team ====
Season	Points leader	Goals leader	Assists leader	PPG leader	PIM leader
2019–20	Marcus Chow (6)	Marcus Chow (5)	Oliver Cole (2)	Marcus Chow (1.00)	William Watson (18)
2018–19	David Kubánek (7)	David Kubánek (6)	Oliver Cole / Wei Kang Tan (2)	David Kubánek (1.40)	Wassili Korobitsyn (4)
2017–18	Matthias David (8)	Matthias David / Ben Freeman (6)	Victoria Heyes (3)	Ben Freeman (1.75)	Matthias David / Ben Freeman (2)

=== Record scorelines ===
==== Biggest wins ====
Rank	Margin	Score	Opponent	Team	Date
1	+34	35–1	Oxford Vikings	A Team	6 Nov 2016
2	+31	32–1	Cardiff Redhawks	A Team	31 Jan 2026
3	+30	30–0	Cambridge Women's Blues	B Team	23 Jan 2016
4	+21	21–0	Southampton Spitfires C	B Team	5 Mar 2016
5	+17	19–2	UEA Avalanche	A Team	5 Dec 2012
6	+14	15–1	Oxford Vikings	A Team	24 Jan 2026
7	+13	14–1	Southampton Spitfires B	A Team	7 Feb 2015
8	+13	16–3	Cardiff Redhawks	A Team	17 Jan 2026
9	+10	11–1	Oxford Vikings	A Team	2 Nov 2025
10	+10	12–2	Cardiff Redhawks	A Team	15 Feb 2015

==== Biggest losses ====
Rank	Margin	Score	Opponent	Team	Date
1	–26	0–26	London Dragons	A Team	17 Feb 2018
2	–21	0–21	Cambridge Blues	A Team	4 Feb 2018
3	–21	0–21	Oxford Vikings	C Team	10 Feb 2018
4	–19	0–19	Oxford Vikings	C Team	3 Feb 2018
5	–18	0–18	Oxford University Blues	A Team	20 Jan 2018
6	–16	0–16	London Dragons	A Team	28 Oct 2017
7	–15	3–18	Cardiff Redhawks	A Team	27 Jan 2018
8	–14	2–16	Oxford University Blues	A Team	10 Feb 2018
9	–14	1–15	Oxford University Blues	A Team	17 Feb 2024
10	–14	0–14	Oxford Vikings	C Team	28 Jan 2018

== See also ==
- British Universities Ice Hockey Association
- Students' Union UCL
- University College London
