= Justice James =

Justice James may refer to:

- Amaziah B. James (1812–1883), judge of the New York Court of Appeals
- Arthur James (judge) (1916–1976), Lord Justice of Appeal of Britain
- Bronson James (fl. 1990s–2020s), justice of the Oregon Supreme Court
- Charles Pinckney James (1818–1899), associate justice of the Supreme Court of the District of Columbia
- Greg James (judge) (born 1944), justice of the Supreme Court of New South Wales
- Richard James (Oklahoma politician) (1926–2013), special justice on the Oklahoma Supreme Court
- William Milbourne James (judge) (1807–1881), Lord Justice of Appeal of Britain

== See also ==
- James Justice (disambiguation)
- Judge James (disambiguation)
- Lord Justice James (disambiguation)
