= Lord Justice James =

Lord Justice James may refer to:

- William Milbourne James (judge)
- Arthur James (judge)

== See also ==
- Justice James (disambiguation)
