= Wildcat Creek (Wachita Creek tributary) =

Stream in the U.S. state of Missouri

Wildcat Creek is a stream in southern St. Francois County in the U.S. state of Missouri. It is a tributary of Wachita Creek.

The stream source is high on the southwest side of Wachita Mountain at 37°40′10″N 90°28′11″W and it flows south and west to its confluence with Washita Creek at 37°39′29″N 90°29′08″W.

Wildcat Creek was so named on account of wildcats in the area.

== See also ==
- List of rivers of Missouri
