= British Universities Ice Hockey Association =

- Abbreviation: BUIHA
- Formation: 2003
- Legal status: Non-Profit Organisation
- Purpose: British University Ice Hockey
- Location: IceSheffield
- Region served: England, Wales & Scotland
- Members: British University Ice Hockey Clubs (25 clubs)
- Chairman: (England) Andrew Miller
- Secretary: (England) Rob Grant
- Fixtures Secretary: (Scotland) Richard Gray
- Key people: (England) Joe Staton (England) David Rogers (England) Nick Ivill (Finland) Essi Aittasalo (England) Alex Carmichael
- Main organ: BUIHA Executive Committee
- Affiliations: British Universities and Colleges Sport
- Website: BUIHA

The British Universities Ice Hockey Association was founded during the spring term 2003 by a group of hockey players from the universities of Oxford, London, Nottingham and Newcastle.

== History of the BUIHA ==
The British Universities Ice Hockey Association, or BUIHA, was formed in response to the growing number of universities with ice hockey programmes in an effort to provide students with competitive ice hockey whilst at university, no matter what their level of play.

The notion to form the BUIHA first arose in Easter 2003. The idea was to simply form a divisional competition for the existing university teams. Development over the summer of 2003 led to a committee being put in place, a schedule being set and a number of teams signed up to take part in the first ever BUIHA University Cup. The National Championships was already an existing competition. Indeed, the 2003/04 formative season finished in style at the National Championships weekend where the then 13 member teams battled it out for The Rawlinson Plate & The Hopkins Plate.

The following season, to further the BUIHA objective of progression at all levels of the sport, the BUIHA introduced Division 3. Also joining the BUIHA in its second season were a number of new university teams, a number that would be again bolstered in its third season, bringing the total teams for 2005-6 to 29.

The 2008/09 season saw the Bristol Lions enter for the first time. The sole new entrant in the 2009/10 season were the newly formed Kent Knights, who arrived on the scene with an old friend lining up in a Knights roster. It was the time that Old Skool had ended his association with Imperial College Devils and was playing for his university for the very first time. The 2010/11 season saw the Oxford Women's Blues join their Cambridge counterparts in Division 3 South, and in 2012 we saw a team from St Andrews enter the National Championships in Tier II.

In the 2012/13 there was a change in cup competition structure, with Division 3 becoming Non-checking Division 1, and the addition of a third checking division. New teams joined the competition from UCL and University of East Anglia, and a reformed Northumbria team joined as the Kings. Unfortunately, the season started without the return of teams from Bristol and Huddersfield.

2013/14 Season saw the Birmingham Eagles finally gain recognition for their Students Guild, part of the deal saw the club rebranded as the Birmingham Lions to fall inline with the other sports clubs at the university.

== National Championships ==
The then secretary of the Oxford Vikings, Alexis Rawlinson, came up with the idea of organising a tournament for all the university ice hockey teams in the UK. At the time this was not such a daunting organisational prospect, given that there were only seven teams.

A few weeks later five teams (blues squads were not invited as they were above the standard of all other teams) gathered for a late night ice hockey session at Oxford Ice Rink starting at 11 pm and running all the way through to the morning. The result of this was a narrow Newcastle victory by one point over the Oxford Vikings. Newcastle arranged the next two events at the National Ice Centre (NIC) in Nottingham, which saw victories for Newcastle in 2002 and London in 2003.

For 2004, to recognise the contribution of Alexis to British University Ice Hockey, the top National Championship trophy was renamed the Rawlinson Plate.

2004 also saw the introduction of a 2nd Tier of competition due to the introduction of many new teams. The BUIHA is now host of a range of new teams from England, Scotland and Wales as well as the original seven that entered the first national championships in 2001. From 2005 onwards tier II was renamed The Hopkins Plate. From the start of the 2015 season onwards the Tier 3 national championship trophy is to be renamed the Miller Trophy to honour the ongoing work the chairman, Andrew Miller, puts into the job.

Following the 2004 season the National Championships have been held at Ice Sheffield.

== Cup competition ==
Created in Autumn 2003 by the founding BUIHA committee the cup competition was envisioned as a league type competition available to university clubs in the UK.

Operating within the EIHA recreational section the clubs involved played a round robin format with the winner being declared at the end of the season as the team with the most points (using goal difference as a tie breaker).

Founding clubs of the initial two divisions (in alphabetical order) were:

Division 1

- Cambridge University Blues
- University of London Union Purples
- Nottingham Universities Mavericks A

Division 2

- Birmingham Eagles
- Cambridge University Eskimos
- Imperial College Devils
- Newcastle University Wildcats
- Nottingham Universities Mavericks B
- Oxford University Vikings
- University of Warwick Panthers

From the 2008/2009 season the BUIHA operated directly under the EIHA board after being awarded a section of their own and separating from the Rec section. This has led to several improvements to the way the organisation can operate.

== Team Great Britain ==
Launched at the end of the 2004–5 season, Team Great Britain is the national university side that will compete against other national university sides, including competing at the bi-annual FISU World University Games. Mike Urquhart & Matt Bradbury have agreed to coach the team. Any person attending university anywhere in the world who is a UK & Northern Ireland citizen between the ages of 17 and 28 is able to play for the team. This disregards the level to which they have played the sport.

== Competition winners ==
=== Checking Division 1 ===
Year	Cup Competition			National Championship
2001	n/a			Newcastle Wildcats
2002	n/a			Newcastle Wildcats
2003	n/a			London Dragons
2004	Cambridge Blues			Nottingham Mavericks
2005	Nottingham Mavericks			London Dragons
2006	Nottingham Mavericks			Nottingham Mavericks
2007	Nottingham Mavericks			Sheffield Bears
2008	North	South	Playoffs	London Dragons
2008	Nottingham Mavericks	London Dragons	London Dragons	London Dragons
2009	Nottingham Mavericks	Oxford Blues	Oxford Blues	Nottingham Mavericks
2010	Newcastle Wildcats	London Dragons	Oxford Blues	Sheffield Bears
2011	Edinburgh Eagles	London Dragons	London Dragons	Southampton Spitfires
2012	Manchester Metros	Oxford Blues	Manchester Metros	London Dragons
2013	Edinburgh Eagles	London Dragons	London Dragons	Sheffield Bears
2014	Edinburgh Eagles	Oxford Blues	Oxford Blues	Southampton Spitfires
2015	Nottingham Mavericks	London Dragons	London Dragons	Southampton Spitfires
2016	Nottingham Mavericks	Cambridge Blues	Cambridge Blues	Oxford Blues
2017	St Andrews Typhoons	London Dragons	London Dragons	Southampton Spitfires
2018	St Andrews Typhoons	Oxford Blues	St Andrews Typhoons	Oxford Blues
2019	Edinburgh Eagles	Cambridge Blues	Edinburgh Eagles	Sheffield Bears
2020	Sheffield Bears	London Dragons	Cancelled due to COVID19 pandemic	
2021	No competitions due to COVID19 pandemic			
2022	No competitions due to COVID19 pandemic			St Andrews Typhoons
2023	Nottingham Mavericks	Oxford Blues	Nottingham Mavericks	Sheffield Bears
2024	Nottingham Mavericks	London Dragons	London Dragons	Cambridge Blues
2025	St Andrews Typhoons	Oxford Blues	Oxford Blues	Sheffield Bears
2026	Nottingham Mavericks	London Dragons	London Dragons	Sheffield Bears

=== Checking Division 2 ===
Year	Cup Competition				National Championship
Year	North		South	Playoffs	National Championship
2004	Newcastle Wildcats		Nottingham Mavericks B	n/a	Sheffield Bears
2005	Edinburgh Eagles		Cambridge Eskimos	n/a	Nottingham Mavericks B
2006	Nottingham Mavericks B		Southampton Spitfires	n/a	Cardiff Redhawks
2007	Northumbria Flames		Birmingham Eagles B	Birmingham Eagles B	Oxford Vikings
2008	Sheffield Bears B		Nottingham Mavericks B	Nottingham Mavericks B	Northumbria Flames
2009	North	Central	South	Playoffs	Manchester Metros
2009	Northumbria Flames	Manchester Metros	Cardiff Redhawks	Northumbria Flames	Manchester Metros
2010	Hull Ice Hogs	Manchester Metros	Oxford Vikings	Manchester Metros	Manchester Metros
2011	North		South	Playoffs	Bradford Sabres
2011	Sheffield Bears B		Bristol Lions	Bristol Lions	Bradford Sabres
2012	Hull Ice Hogs		Cardiff Redhawks	Hull Ice Hogs	Huddersfield Ice Hawks
2013	Sheffield Bears B		Birmingham Eagles	Birmingham Eagles	St Andrews Typhoons
2014	Northumbria Kings		Oxford Vikings	Oxford Vikings	Oxford Vikings
2015	St Andrews Typhoons		UCLU Yetis	St Andrews Typhoons	UCLU Yetis
2016	Birmingham Lions		Cardiff Redhawks	Birmingham Lions	Sheffield Bears B
2017	Leeds Gryphons		UCLU Yetis	Southampton Spitfires	Hull Ice Hogs
2018	Manchester Metros		Southampton Spitfires	Manchester Metros	Manchester Metros
2019	Leeds Gryphons		Imperial Devils	Imperial Devils	Imperial Devils
2020	Sheffield Bears B		Southampton Spitfires	Cancelled due to COVID19 pandemic	
2021	No competitions due to COVID19 pandemic				
2022	No competitions due to COVID19 pandemic				Edinburgh Eagles
2023	Sheffield Bears B		Glasgow Stags	n/a	Northumbria Kings
2024	Leeds Gryphons		Southampton Spitfires	n/a	Southampton Spitfires
2025	Manchester Metros		Imperial Devils	n/a	Imperial Devils
2026	Northumbria Kings		UCL Yetis	n/a	Nottingham Mavericks B

=== Checking Division 3 ===
Year	Cup Competition
Year	South
2013	UCLU Yetis

=== Non-checking Division 1 (formerly Division 3) ===
Year	Cup Competition				National Championship
2006	n/a				Nottingham Mavericks C
2007	Sheffield Bears C				Cardiff Redhawks B
2008	North		South	Playoffs	Nottingham Mavericks C
2008	Northumbria Flames B		Nottingham Mavericks C	n/a	Nottingham Mavericks C
2009	Sheffield Bears C		Cardiff Redhawks B	Cardiff Redhawks B	Cardiff Redhawks B
2010	Sheffield Bears C		Warwick Panthers B	n/a	Nottingham Mavericks C
2011	Nottingham Mavericks C		Warwick Panthers B	Nottingham Mavericks C	Warwick Panthers B
2012	North	Central	South	Playoffs	Southampton Spitfires B
2012	Edinburgh Beagles	Nottingham Mavericks C	Southampton Spitfires B	Edinburgh Beagles	Southampton Spitfires B
2013	North		South	Playoffs	Northumbria Kings
2013	Northumbria Kings		Southampton Spitfires B	Southampton Spitfires B	
2014	Newcastle Wildcats		Birmingham Lions B	Newcastle Wildcats	Northumbria Kings B
2015	Northumbria Kings B		Coventry and Warwick Panthers B	Northumbria Kings B	Northumbria Kings B
2016	Sheffield Bears C		Coventry and Warwick Panthers	Coventry and Warwick Panthers	Imperial Devils
2017	Sheffield Bears C		Southampton Spitfires B	Sheffield Bears C	Nottingham Mavericks C
2018	Northumbria Kings B		Southampton Spitfires B	Southampton Spitfires B	Kent Knights
2019	Northumbria Kings B		Southampton Spitfires	Southampton Spitfires	Southampton Spitfires
2020	Sheffield Bears C		London Dragons B	Cancelled due to COVID19 pandemic	
2021	No competitions due to COVID19 pandemic				
2022	No competitions due to COVID19 pandemic				Sheffield Bears C
2023	Northumbria Kings B		Oxford Vikings	Oxford Vikings	Oxford Vikings
2024	Sheffield Bears C		Oxford Vikings	Oxford Vikings	Oxford Vikings
2025	Nottingham Mavericks C		Oxford Vikings B	Nottingham Mavericks C	Oxford Vikings B
2026	Sheffield Bears C		Oxford Womens Blues	Sheffield Bears C	Cambridge Huskies

=== Non-checking Division 2 ===
Year	Cup Competition			National Championship
Year	North	South	Playoffs	National Championship
2013	n/a	Birmingham Eagles C	n/a	n/a
2014	Northumbria Kings B	n/a	n/a	Bradford Sabres B
2015	Bradford Sabres B	Coventry and Warwick Panthers C	Bradford Sabres B	Nottingham Mavericks B
2016	Leeds Gryphons	UCL Yetis B	Leeds Gryphons	Imperial Devils B
2017	Northumbria Kings B	Kent Knights	Kent Knights	Kent Knights
2018	Leeds Gryphons B	Cardiff Breadhawks	Leeds Gryphons B	Hull Ice Hogs
2019	Bradford Sabres	Oxford Vikings	Oxford Vikings	UCL Yetis B
2020	Newcastle Wildcats B	Southampton Spitfires B	Cancelled due to COVID19 pandemic	
2021	No competitions due to COVID19 pandemic			
2022	No competitions due to COVID19 pandemic			Hull Ice Hogs
2023	Glasgow Stags B	Cambridge Huskies	n/a	Leeds Gryphons B
2024	Leeds Gryphons B	Oxford Vikings B	n/a	Warwick and Coventry Panthers
2025	Glasgow Stags B	Kent Knights	n/a	Manchester Metros C
2026	Machester Metros C	Warwick and Coventry Panthers	n/a	UEA Avalanche

=== Non-checking Division 3 ===
Year	Cup Competition			National Championship
Year	North	South	Playoffs	National Championship
2015	n/a			Imperial Devils C
2016	n/a			Sheffield Bears E
2017	n/a	Cambridge Women’s Blues	n/a	Nottingham Mavericks D
2018	n/a	Oxford Vikings	n/a	UEA Avalanche
2019	Nottingham Mavericks D	Coventry and Warwick Panthers B	Coventry and Warwick Panthers B	Sheffield Bears E
2020	Caledonia Steel Queens	Birmingham Lions C	Cancelled due to COVID19 pandemic	
2021	No competitions due to COVID19 pandemic			
2022	No competitions due to COVID19 pandemic			UCL Yetis C
2023	n/a	Oxford Vikings B	n/a	Sheffield Bears E
2024	n/a	n/a	n/a	Sheffield Bears F
2025	Sheffield Bears E	n/a	n/a	Bristol Bloodhounds
2026	Newcastle Wildcats B	Imperial Devils B	n/a	UCL Yetis B

=== Non-checking Division 4 ===
Year	National Championship
2018	Oxford Vikings B
2019	Imperial Devils C
2026	Imperial Devils C

=== Womens Division 1 ===
Year	Cup Competition			National Championship
2017	n/a			Oxford Womens Blues
2018	n/a			Nottingham Mavericks Women
2019	n/a			Caledonia Steel Queens
2020	n/a			Cancelled due to COVID19 pandemic
2021	No competitions due to COVID19 pandemic			
2022	No competitions due to COVID19 pandemic			Caledonia Steel Queens
2023	n/a			Caledonia Steel Queens
2024	n/a			Cambridge Womens Blues
2025	North	South	Playoffs	Oxford Womens Blues
2025	Sheffield Bears Women	Oxford Womens Blues	Oxford Womens Blues	Oxford Womens Blues
2026	Sheffield Bears Women	Oxford Womens Blues	Oxford Womens Blues	Oxford Womens Blues

=== Womens Division 2 ===
Year	National Championship
2026	Leeds Gryphons Women

== Member teams ==
Locations of the BUIHA 2026–27 teams

Club	Foundation	Entry to BUIHA	Home Rink
Birmingham Lions Formed as Birmingham Eagles	2001	2003	Planet Ice Solihull
Bristol Bloodhounds	2024	2025	Planet Ice Bristol
Cambridge University Ice Hockey Club	1885	2004	Cambridge Ice Arena
Cardiff Redhawks	2005	2005	Vindico Arena
Coventry and Warwick Panthers	2002	2004	SkyDome Arena
Edinburgh Eagles	2003	2004	Murrayfield Ice Rink
Glasgow Stags	2019	2019	Braehead Arena
Hull Ice Hogs Formed as Hull Hawks	2007	2007	Hull Arena
Imperial College Devils	2000	2003	Streatham Ice Arena, Alexandra Palace Ice Rink
Kent Knights	2009	2009	Streatham Ice Arena
Leeds Gryphons Formed as Leeds Jaguars	2015	2015	Planet Ice Leeds
London Dragons Formed as ULU Purples	2002	2003	Lee Valley Ice Centre, Streatham Ice Arena
Manchester Metros Formed as Manchester Metrostars	2001	2004	Planet Ice Altrincham
Newcastle Wildcats	1994	2003	Whitley Bay Ice Rink
Nottingham Mavericks	2001	2003	National Ice Centre
North East Angels	2020	2021	Whitley Bay Ice Rink
Northumbria Kings Formed as Northumbria Flames	2001	2003	Whitley Bay Ice Rink
Oxford University Ice Hockey Club	1885	2004	Oxford Ice Rink
Southampton Spitfires	2002	2004	Planet Ice Basingstoke, Planet Ice Gosport
Sheffield Bears	2004	2004	IceSheffield
St Andrews Typhoons	2011	2012	Fife Ice Arena
Stirling Squirrels	2026	2026	Braehead Arena
University of Aberdeen	2025	2026	Linx Ice Arena
University College London Yetis	2011	2012	Streatham Ice Arena, Alexandra Palace Ice Rink
University of East Anglia Avalanche	2011	2012	Cambridge Ice Arena
