= Right Fork Little Kanawha River =

- Location of the mouth of the Right Fork Little Kanawha River in West Virginia

Location
- Country: United States
- State: West Virginia
- Counties: Upshur, Webster, Lewis, Braxton

Physical characteristics
- Source
  - location: west of Helvetia
  - coordinates: 38.6956607°N 80.2836907°W
  - elevation: 2,698 ft (822 m)
- Mouth: Little Kanawha River
  - location: southwest of Wildcat
  - coordinates: 38.7434347°N 80.4550862°W
  - elevation: 945 ft (288 m)
- Length: 14.1 mi (22.7 km)
- Basin size: 37.6 sq mi (97 km^{2})

The Right Fork Little Kanawha River is a tributary of the Little Kanawha River, 14.1 miles (22.7 km) long, in central West Virginia in the United States. Via the Little Kanawha and Ohio rivers, it is part of the watershed of the Mississippi River, draining an area of 37.6 square miles (97 km^{2}) in a rural region.

The Right Fork Little Kanawha River rises in extreme southeastern Upshur County, approximately 4 miles (6.4 km) west of Helvetia, and flows generally westward along the boundary between Upshur and Webster counties; then along the boundary between Lewis and Webster counties, through the community of Cleveland. Near its mouth it flows through a small portion of the eastern extremity of Braxton County, and flows into the Little Kanawha River from the south near the boundary between Braxton and Lewis counties, approximately 2 miles (3.2 km) southwest of the community of Wildcat.

Upstream of Cleveland the Right Fork collects a tributary named Left Fork Right Fork Little Kanawha River, which flows westward for 7.1 miles (11.4 km) through southern Upshur County.

== See also ==
- List of rivers of West Virginia
