= Newcastle Wildcats =

University ice hockey team in England

- League: British Universities Ice Hockey Association; Northern Section
- Founded: 1994
- Home arena: Whitley Bay Ice Rink
- Colours: Blue, Red, White
- Website: newcastlewildcats.co.uk

Championships
- Playoff championships: pre-BUIHA; National Championships 2001, 2002; BUIHA era; Division 2 Champions (North) 2004; Division 1 Champions (North) 2010; Tier IV Nationals - Champions 2013; Tier I Nationals - 3rd place 2013

The Newcastle Wildcats are a university ice hockey team representing Newcastle University in the United Kingdom. NUIHC are a member club of the British Universities Ice Hockey Association (BUIHA) and ice two non-checking teams in tier 1 and 2 of UK university competition.

The club is notable for now being the 3rd oldest amongst modern British university ice hockey programmes (having been founded in 1994) and for the fact that it was the first to introduce mixed gender participation into a full-contact university sport.

The Wildcats operate a successful beginners' training programme to develop new players. Partially as a result of this, Newcastle University was the most represented institution in terms of player registration within the BUIHA for three seasons with the Wildcats preferring to ice teams consisting almost totally of Newcastle students and mostly shunning the popular practice of pooling players from the maximum possible number of institutions. Since their inception, the Wildcats have mainly been based at Whitley Bay Ice Rink, alongside the semi-professional Whitley Warriors, rivals Northumbria Kings (previously Flames) and, at one time, the Newcastle Vipers of the Elite Ice Hockey League. Both Newcastle University and Northumbria Clubs often played at the Metro Radio Arena during hockey evenings hosted by the Vipers, indeed the Vipers included the game between the two University teams as part of their 'farewell evening' when they left the city centre rink.

== History ==
The Wildcats have a storied history, claiming the first two university National Championships in 2001 and 2002. They have been less successful, however, in the BUIHA era of British university hockey. After winning the Division Two (North) title in 2004, a long trophy drought was ended by a rampant first team, who won the Division One (North) title for the 2009/10 season and advanced to the national playoff finals. In 2013 the Club's C-Team won the BUIHA Tier IV Nationals - a remarkable achievement as the squad had struggled throughout the year in the Cup competition.

The Newcastle Wildcats were officially formed in 1994 by Ian Pitcher, having existed as a loose collection of Newcastle University students in previous years. One of the original coaches & players for the team was ex NHL Pittsburgh Penguins and Whitley Warriors stalwart Mike Rowe - who was studying for a postgraduate degree at the time. The newly created Wildcats would play out of Whitley Bay Ice Rink, situated on the coast just outside the city centre and represented the city of Newcastle upon Tyne as a whole by pooling players from both Newcastle University and the newly incorporated Northumbria University. This collaboration was the reason for the choice of the neutral Wildcats name, as opposed to Royals, which is the traditional nickname used by Newcastle University's sports teams. Throughout their early existence, the club iced only one team almost exclusively in challenge games against recreational ice hockey sides in the North East, rather than other higher education institutions.

This partnership lasted until 2001, when Northumbria University students formed a new side to call their own, the Flames. This was the same year of the first national championships contested by British university sides, which was won by the Wildcats in their final appearance as a dual-university club. The success of this inaugural university tournament led to its repeat the following year, and it was again claimed by now single-institution Wildcats. With the National Championships a huge success and a growing number of institutions expressing interest in entering teams into competition, the Wildcats became a founding member of the British Universities Ice Hockey Association (BUIHA) upon its formation the following year in 2003.

With the creation of the BUIHA and, with it, properly organised divisions and regular competition against other universities (not least local rivals Northumbria Flames) the level of interest swelled and the Wildcats launched a new team, under the guidance of Andrew Miller, and whilst not held in the same regard as the club founder, Uncle Ian, Andrew Miller's name is known by all club members and is etched into history. Especially when he founded the 'B' team, in 2004 to ice in the new third tier of university competition. The first team exceeded expectations this academic year of competition, claiming the top spot in Division Two's northern section to take the number of trophies lifted by the Wildcats to three in four years.

Two years later, another groundswell of interest in university ice hockey - particularly from students with little previous experience - led the club to set up a beginners' training programme and enter a development team, named the 'C' team, into the new third tier of BUIHA competition. With the aim of training and developing new players, the club continues to produce players who are able to compete at intermediate level competition with the 'B' team as little as twelve months after beginning to skate.

== Stan Calvert Cup ==
Ice Hockey is one of the sports involved in the Annual Stan Calvert Cup Competition between Newcastle and Northumbria Universities. The games used to be played at the Metro Radio Arena (in the days when it had an ice pad) in front of crowds numbering in the hundreds (and occasionally, the thousands) and often in the same programme as the Newcastle Vipers professional ice hockey team.

== Ball/Dek/Floor Hockey ==
For many years the Club ran a 'Stick Training' session in the University Sports Centre. The aim of the session was to enhance the stick handling and fitness skills of players without the expense of valuable ice time. In the 2011-12 season Joy Craighead developed these sessions further and created the Club's Dek Squad. Dek, or 'Street & Ball Hockey', uses much of the same equipment as ice hockey but is played in a normal sports centre gym, rather than an ice rink, so players run rather than skate.

=== External Ball Hockey Competitions ===
In February 2012 members of the Squad competed in the Fantastic Fours Dek Tournament in Gateshead Leisure Centre earning themselves a fleeting appearance on BSkyB.

For the 2012-2013 season the Squad finished fourth in the UKBH Northern Conference and once again competed in the NEDekStars 'Fantastic Fours' Competition against 15 teams.

In May 2013 the squad competed in the Ball Hockey UK National Championships and finished in second place to the South Notts Outlaws in the Tier III Final.

=== Internal Ball Hockey Competitions ===
Each year the Club holds a mini 3v3 tournament and competes for the 'Craighead Cup' (named after the tournament's founder, Joy Craighead).

== Notable former players ==
=== Retired jerseys ===
#	Nat	Player	Ret	Achievements
42	(United Kingdom)	Ian Pitcher	2002	Founder of the Newcastle Wildcats - in 2000 the NUIHC Committee made Ian the Club's Honorary President for Life
23	(United Kingdom)	Andrew Miller	2009	Member of the club for nine years, sitting on the committee for three (including one year as club president). BUIHA chairman.
14	(United Kingdom)	Mike Brett	2010	Member of the club for eight years, sitting on the committee for three. Alumni jersey retired in recognition of the work put into setting up the Wildcats Alumni section
44	(United Kingdom)	Joy Craighead	2013	Dedicated to NUIHC even before starting University, committee member, C-team Captain, BUIHA Players' Representative, NUIHC's top point scorer in the 2013 Tier IV BUIHA Nationals-winning team and the regular season Cup Competition. Founder of the Newcastle University Wildcats Dek/Ball Hockey Squad and the corresponding Annual 3v3 'Craighead Cup' Tournament. Twice selected for the GB National Ball Hockey Team at the Street & Ball Hockey World Championships.
52	(United Kingdom)	Phoebe Grime	2021	Phoebe was a member of the Wildcats, who died in 2021. The Phoebe Grime Memorial Award: Spirit of a Wildcat, now exists in her name and is awarded annually to the member who best reflects those qualities.
24	(United Kingdom)	Mich Addison	2024	Mich gave years of service to the Wildcats as a coach and mentor. He was a well-known and respected figure across the North East hockey scene. He dedicated endless amounts of time to developing players and growing the club, quietly and consistently, without need for recognition. The Mich Addison Memorial Award is presented annually in his honour to the member who best reflects his dedication to the development of others.
25	(United Kingdom)	Joe Gubbins	2026	Joe's association with the Wildcats spans 10+ years. Serving on committee for three years, President for two, he was a large driving force in the growth of the club. His contribution extended across every level of the club. Retired in 2026 for extended dedication to the club, marking a decade of service to the Newcastle Wildcats.

=== Other notable players ===
Nat	Name	Active	Notable for
(Canada)	Mike Rowe	1997-98	Selected by Pittsburgh Penguins round 3 #58 overall 1983 NHL entry draft. Long time defenceman for Whitley Warriors
(Luxembourg)	Joel Holtzem	2004-05	Played professionally in the German leagues, represented Luxembourg internationally.
(Finland)	Tuomo Hirovenen	2006	Played in the Mestis, Suomi-sarja and currently in 2. Divisioona.
(United Kingdom)	Robert Grant	2004-2007, 2013-2014.	Secretary of the British Universities Ice Hockey Association.
(United Kingdom)	Marcus Hinkley	2006-09	Captained Newcastle ENL Vipers.
