= Harold Challenor =

British SAS soldier and policeman

Harold Gordon "Tanky" Challenor, MM (16 March 1922 – 28 August 2008) was a wartime member of the SAS, decorated for his part in Operation Speedwell. After the war, he joined the Metropolitan Police, spending much of his career in Criminal Investigation Department (CID). In 1963, when holding the rank of Detective Sergeant, he was charged with corruption offences and was subsequently found to have been suffering from mental health problems and deemed not to be fit to stand trial. He was sent to a secure hospital, and on his release, he joined the firm of solicitors which had defended him. A public inquiry was held into his actions and why his health problems had not been noticed by his superiors.

== War service ==
During the Second World War, Challenor served as a member of the Royal Army Medical Corps in North Africa and Italy between 1942 and 1944 before joining 62 Commando, which later formed part of the Special Air Service, as a lance-corporal. He later described himself as "the most aggressive medical orderly the Commandos ever had". He received the nickname of "Tanky" after losing his commando beret and having to borrow one from the Tank Corps.

From 7 September 1943, he took part in Operation Speedwell in which he helped derail three trains behind enemy lines. Following the operation, Challenor was twice captured but managed to escape each time, eventually reaching safety. He was one of only two out of the six soldiers involved in the operation to survive.

Challenor was awarded the Military Medal on 9 November 1944.

The citation read:

This N.C.O. was dropped by parachute near Borgo val di Taro, north of Spezia, on the 7th Sept 43. The total detachment consisted of 2 officers and 4 O.R. After landing the detachment split, L/Cpl. Challenor accompanying one officer. This small detachment succeeded in derailing two trains on the Spezia - Parma line on night 14th of September at a point north of Pontremoli. Again, on the night 18th September a third train was derailed south of Villafranca. Having no further explosives, the detachment started to return to our lines. During this time, the enemy were continually searching for escaped P.W. and on 27 December the officer was captured. L/Cpl Challenor continued southwards alone; he was captured north of Chieti, but succeeded in escaping later from Aquila P.W. camp. He continued south and on 5 April 44 was again captured while attempting to pass through enemy lines; on the 7th April he again escaped and reached our lines. Throughout the seven months spent behind enemy lines, this N.C.O. displayed the highest courage and determination.

In later service, Challoner began to show a propensity for violence towards prisoners. In describing an occasion when he was in charge of some captive Gestapo officers, he recalled that "[o]ne of them made the mistake of smiling at me. The gaze I returned had him backing away. Then I took them out one by one and exercised them with some stiff fisticuffs." He was already showing signs of delusions at this stage of his career. Challenor eventually reached the rank of company quartermaster sergeant before completing his military service in 1947.

== Police service ==
Challenor joined the Metropolitan Police in 1951. During his police career, he served in the CID and the Flying Squad before eventually moving to West End Central Police Station in Mayfair in 1962, from which he was involved in policing the Soho area of London. At one point, he had a record of over 100 arrests in seven months and he eventually totalled 600 arrests and received 18 commendations. By the end of his career, Challoner's modus operandi included punching a suspect from Barbados while singing "Bongo, bongo, bongo, I don't want to leave the Congo". Various of his accused claimed to have been beaten up or have had evidence planted on them but, at first, this did not prevent conviction.

== The Challenor case ==
On 11 July 1963 Challenor arrested Donald Rooum, a cartoonist for Peace News, who was demonstrating outside Claridge's hotel against Queen Frederika of Greece. He told Rooum: "You're fucking nicked, my beauty. Boo the Queen, would you?" and hit him on the head. Going through Rooum's possessions, Challenor added a half-brick, saying, "There you are, me old darling. Carrying an offensive weapon. You can get two years for that." Rooum, a member of the National Council for Civil Liberties who had read about forensic science, handed his clothes to his solicitor for testing. No brick dust or appropriate wear and tear were found and Rooum was acquitted, although other people Challenor arrested at the demonstration were still convicted on his evidence.

By the time Challenor appeared at the Old Bailey in 1964, charged with conspiracy to pervert the course of justice, he was deemed to be unfit to plead and was sent to Netherne mental hospital with a diagnosis of paranoid schizophrenia. Since then, it has been suggested that he might have been suffering from post-traumatic stress disorder. Three other detectives (David Oakley, Frank Battes and Keith Goldsmith) were sentenced to three years in prison.

The case of Challenor was raised in Parliament on several occasions. A statutory inquiry headed by Arthur James was eventually set up—the first such under the Police Act 1964. It was considered by some to be a whitewash and to have allowed police corruption to continue within the Metropolitan Police unabated. In the report, Challenor's mental illness was blamed for the false arrests rather than a systemic policy of framing suspects. The lack of a follow-up prosecution of Challenor after he was discharged from hospital was also criticised as establishment corruption. Because of this, "doing a Challenor" became a police slang expression for avoiding punishment and prosecution through retiring sick from the force. "According to Mary Grigg's book The Challenor Case, a total of twenty-six innocent men were charged during Challenor's corrupt activities. Of these thirteen were imprisoned spending a total of thirteen years in gaol. On his release from the hospital, Challenor worked for the firm of solicitors which had defended him during his trial."
