= Jimmy Justice =

Jimmy Justice is the name of:

- Jimmy Justice (musician) (1939–2022), English pop singer
- Jimmy Justice (activist), pseudonym of a video activist in New York City

== See also ==
- James Justice (disambiguation)
