= USS Wildcat =

USS Wildcat and its variant spelling, is a name used more than once by the United States Navy:

- USS Wild Cat (1822), schooner purchased at Baltimore, Maryland, late in 1822.
- USS Wild Cat (1862), a captured schooner that served in the American Civil War.
- USS Wild Cat (1915), a freighter commissioned on 17 July 1917.
- USS Wildcat (AW-2), also known as IX-130, a Stag-class tanker, built for the United States Navy during World War II.
