= Birmingham Lions Ice Hockey club =

University ice hockey team in England

- City: Birmingham, England
- League: BUIHA
- Founded: 2001
- Home arena: Planet Ice Solihull
- Colours: Red
- Website: www.sportandfitness.bham.ac.uk/sport/discover-sport/ice-hockey/

The Birmingham Lions are a university ice hockey team representing the University of Birmingham and other Universities located nearby. The Birmingham Lions are member of the British Universities Ice Hockey Association (BUIHA) and as of 2026 have five teams: a Checking Team, a Women's Team and three Non-Checking teams. The team currently play at Planet Ice Solihull on Hobbs Moat Road which Is also home to the Clubs annual Ice bull varsity match against the University of Manchester Metros.

The club was founded in 2001 as the Birmingham Eagles as a Phoenix club for the recently defunct team of the same name. In 2013/14 the club was officially affiliated with the University of Birmingham and changed its name to the Lions to match the University's other sports teams.

== History ==
The team was first founded as the Birmingham Eagles in 2001 by students who had been players on a previous team that had gone by the same name. In 2004 the Eagles would join the British University Ice Hockey Association becoming one of the first teams to join the association. In the 2006/7 season the Eagles B team would compete in the Inaugural Division 2 south. and win the cup competition in the same season In 2012/13 the Eagles C team would win the Non-Checking 2 Southern Division in their first League season, In the same season the Eagles would win the Checking 2 Southern division and the Checking 2 Cup competition.

In the 2013/14 season the club rebranded to the Birmingham Lions to better align with the other University of Birmingham sports teams. The 2013/14 would see the team's first varsity game against the Hull Ice Hogs which was won 6-1 by the visiting Ice Hogs. The Birmingham Lions B team won the 2013/14 Non-Checking division 1 south which as of 2026 is Birmingham Lions B team's Last division victory. The 2014/15 season saw the club play a home and away varsity match for the first time against the Ice Hogs with the Ice Hogs winning both games 10-6.

The 2015/16 season would see the Lions face new opponents in their varsity match, the visiting Cardiff Redhawks would lose 4-2 to the Lions marking the Lions first Varsity win. 2015/16 saw further success for the Lions with victory in both the Checking 2 cup competition and the Checking 2 Northern division. 2016/17 would see a return to the Home and Away varsity games although this time against the Cardiff Redhawks with the Lions losing both games comfortably, losing 12-5 at home and 12-2 away.

The Lions 2019 varsity game was the first In which they faced the nearby Warwick and Coventry Panthers winning 8-5 at home. The 2019/20 season would see Lions C team win Non-Checking Division 3 South the most recent division win for any Lions team. The 2019/20 Varsity match would again be between the Lions and the Panthers with the Panthers coming out victorious beating the Lions 6-3.

The COVID-19 Pandemic meant that the 20/21 season was cancelled.

2022 would see the Lions face new varsity opponents as they faced off against the Manchester Metros for the first time in a varsity game winning 10-1 at home. While a varsity was planned for 2023 financial difficulties caused the team to cancel the event. 2024 would see the return of Varsity matches with the Lions facing the Manchester Metros again and losing 4-6 after having a player ejected from the game. The 2024-25 season would see the Birmingham Lions Women's team compete in the first women's southern division and enter the BUIHA women's national championships for the first time winning the bronze playoffs. The 2025 varsity match saw the Lions beat the Metros 5-4 in overtime. The first battle of the Midlands took place in 2025 seeing the Lions B team face the Coventry and Warwick panthers at the Coventry Skydome losing 5-4 to the Panthers. In 2026 the Lions won varsity for a second consecutive year beating the Manchester Metros 2-1 and the Lions B earned their first battle of the Midlands victory at the Coventry Sky dome beating the Panthers 6-3. In the 2026 BUIHA national championships the Lions won the Silver Playoffs which earned them their first Nationals or Division trophy in 10 years.
