= James Justice =

James Justice could refer to:

- James Justice (horticulturalist) (1698–1763), Scottish horticulturalist and gardener
- James Robertson Justice (1907–1975), British actor
- Jim Justice (born 1951), U.S. Senator from West Virginia, American businessman, and former governor of West Virginia
- James Justice Jr. (born 1989), American basketball player

== See also ==
- Jimmy Justice (disambiguation)
- Justice James (disambiguation)
