= Jules Gilmer Korner Jr. =

American judge (1888–1967)

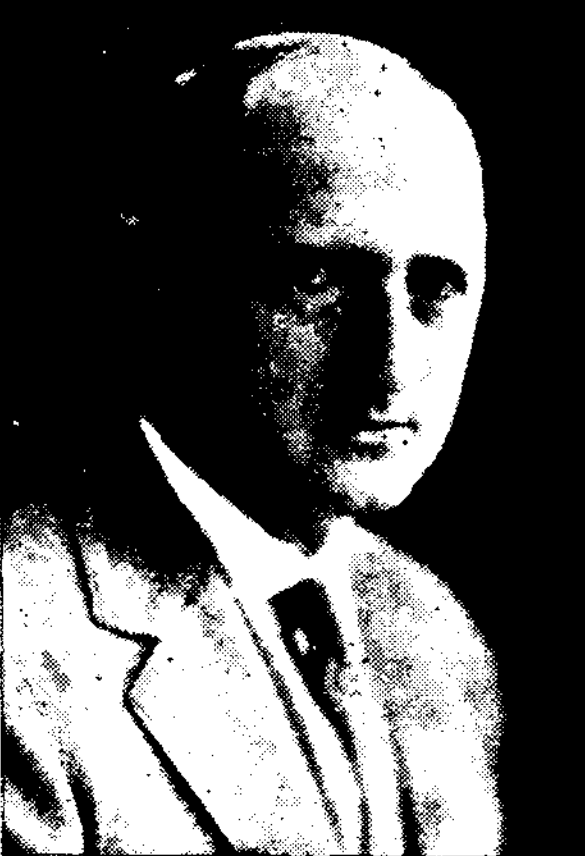
Jules G. Korner in 1926

Jules Gilmer Korner Jr. (July 24, 1888 – January 14, 1967) was a judge of the United States Board of Tax Appeals (later the United States Tax Court) from 1924 to 1927.

Born in Winston-Salem, North Carolina, Korner received an A.M. from Trinity College of Arts and Sciences, North Carolina in 1909, and later attended the Harvard Law School. Korner enlisted in the United States Navy in 1917, during World War I. After the war resumed the practice of law in Winston-Salem. He joined the Bureau of Internal Revenue as special attorney in the office of the solicitor on July 1, 1921. He was appointed assistant solicitor in charge of the penal division on January 1, 1923.

Korner was one of the original twelve members appointed to the Board of Tax Appeals, and one of a group of five appointed "from the Bureau of Internal Revenue". Korner was "an intimate personal friend of David H. Blair", who was Commissioner of Internal Revenue at the time of Korner's appointment. During Korner's service as chairman of the board, Albert E. James and Adolphus E. Graupner were the only members not reappointed to the Board when their initial terms expired, reportedly "because of their differences of opinion with [Korner], concerning 'administrative matters'".

Korner married Susan Leonard Brown died in October 1917, with whom he had one son, Jules G. Korner III, who also served as a U.S. tax court judge. Korner died in Chevy Chase, Maryland at the age of 78.
