= Cleveland, West Virginia =

Unincorporated community in West Virginia, United States

- Unincorporated community
- Location within West Virginia Location within the United States
- Coordinates: 38°43′37″N 80°23′32″W
- Country: United States
- State: West Virginia
- County: Webster
- Elevation: 1,276 ft (389 m)
- Time zone: UTC-5 (Eastern (EST))
  - Summer (DST): UTC-4 (EDT)
- ZIP code: 26215
- Area codes: 304 & 681
- GNIS feature ID: 1537401

Cleveland is an unincorporated community in Webster County, West Virginia, United States. Cleveland is located 17 miles (27 km) north of Webster Springs on West Virginia Route 20, along the Right Fork Little Kanawha River. Cleveland has a post office.

== History ==
The first post office was established in 1853 and was named Buffalo Fork, after the small nearby stream that flows into the right fork of the Little Kanawha River.

In 1883 the post office was called "Point" because a shorter name was preferred for postal purposes. In 1885 the post office name was changed to Cleveland, in honor of Grover Cleveland, who was beginning his first term as President of the United States.
