= Donald Rooum =

English anarchist cartoonist and writer (1928–2019)

Donald Rooum C.Biol M.I.Biol
- Born: 20 April 1928; Bradford, England
- Died: 31 August 2019 (aged 91); London, England
- Education: Bradford Regional Art School; Open University
- Occupations: Cartoonist; Writer
- Notable work: Wildcat
- Other political affiliations: Society for Cultural Relations; Young Communist League
- Movement: Anarchism
- Partner: Irene Brown
- Children: 4
- National service
- Allegiance: British Armed Forces
- Branch: British Army
- Conscripted: 1945-47
- Rank: Private
- Corps: ACC

Donald Rooum (20 April 1928 – 31 August 2019) was an English anarchist cartoonist and writer. He had a long association with the Freedom newspaper in London, to which he regularly submitted his Wildcat comic strips. In 1963 Rooum played a key role in exposing Harold Challenor, a corrupt police officer who had unsuccessfully tried to frame him for carrying an offensive weapon.

== Early life and education ==
Donald Rooum was born and raised in a working-class family in Bradford, Yorkshire. His parents were Baptists and members of the Labour Party. However, his mother joined a communist front organisation called the Society for Cultural Relations, which Rooum also joined. He also joined the Young Communist League, to which he belonged for a month. As a child, he obtained a scholarship to attend Bradford Grammar School, a private school. Rooum recalled that he did 'quite well on school exams' but when he was about 16 years old he became distracted by anarchism. The distraction might have happened in the summer of 1944. In the September Rooum answered an advertisement from the Ministry of Food for boys to go hop-picking in Kent. Anarchist Philip Sansom (1985) picked up the story: 'On his first Sunday off work he came to London to have a look at the famous "Speaker's Corner" at Marble Arch - the North-East corner of Hyde Park.' He continued:

'At the park gates he ... found me, selling anarchist literature, and bought a copy of the anarchist journal of that time - War Commentary - and a copy of Alexander Berkman's ABC of Anarchism. (Sansom 1985, p. 3)

Rooum registered as a conscientious objector but was pressured by his family into undertaking military service, which started in 1945. He left the army in 1947 without a pension but with a resettlement grant, which enabled him to study commercial design at Bradford Regional Art School from 1949 to 1953. A 1952 portrait of him by Frank Lisle, one of his lecturers at the School, is displayed in The Hepworth Wakefield. While a student, Rooum spoke at Market Street in Bradford but had to give it up because he was physically attacked by a group of Roman Catholic students. However, on Friday evenings he took a tram to the depot in Crossflatts and then walked twelve miles to the youth hostel in Colne, Lancashire. The hostel hosted meetings of the Colne and Nelson Anarchist Group, which was attended by members from as far as Liverpool and Birmingham and which was organized by one of the wardens of the hostel. Also, the group joined with the local branches of the Peace Pledge Union, the Syndicalist Workers' Federation and the Independent Labour Party to form the Nelson and Colne Antimilitarist Group.

== Employment ==
Rooum graduated from art school in 1954, after which he moved to London and got a job. He recalled that some other members of the Colne group had also migrated to London and that initially he shared a room with former member Jack Robinson, who was working with Lilian Wolfe and Mary Canipa in the Freedom Bookshop. He then shared a room with Irene Brown, with whom he lived for twenty-seven years and had four children. Initially Rooum worked for short periods for a succession of employers. Then he took a course in typographic design in which he obtained a City and Guilds Full Technological Certificate (First Class). Afterwords, he became a layout artist and typographer in London advertising agencies until 1966. He then worked as a lecturer in typographic design at the London College of Printing.

During 1973 to 1979, Rooum studied life sciences at the Open University from 1973 to 1979 and was awarded a first-class degree at the age of 51. He retired as a lecturer in 1983. In 2004 he became a Chartered Biologist and he was elected Member of the Institute of Biology (incorporated into the Society of Biology) at the age of seventy-six. Rooum recalled that he could not become a member of the Institute sooner because he was not a practising biologist. However, he became a member after he had published some articles in learned journals.

== Activism ==
After having met Sansom, Rooum subscribed to War Commentary on his return to Bradford. In August 1949, he attended the annual Anarchist Summer School, which was held that year in Liverpool, and in which he "made a memorable impact on the anarchist movement in general." Rooum then became an outdoor speaker at Speaker's Corner, and became a writer for and an editor of Freedom, the successor of War Commentary after the end of the Second World War.

Rooum was a founding member of the Malatesta Club, an anarchist social club and venue that opened in London on May Day 1954. Rooum and Irene Brown worked as volunteers there.

Around 1968, a long-running feud began between Vernon Richards and the Freedom collective on the one hand, and Albert Meltzer and Black Flag on the other. During the feud Rooum maintained his association with Richards and the Freedom collective.

== Political affiliation ==
Rooum concluded his 1987 article Anarchism and selfishness as follows:

"The most influential source is Max Stirner. I am happy to be called a Stirnerite anarchist, provided 'Stirnerite' means one who agrees with Stirner's general drift, not one who agrees with Stirner's every word."

Thomas (2017) observed:

"In the 1940s, the anarcho-syndicalists of the Glasgow Anarchist Group made Stirner’s ideas the basis of their organizing. They took Stirner’s idea of the union of egoists literally as a way of freely organizing within industry and thus explained syndicalism as “applied egoism.” The anarcho-communist activist and cartoonist Donald Rooum was introduced to Stirner by members of this group and has adhered to conscious egoism ever since."

In 2016 Rooum included an extract from Stirner's 1959 Freedom and self-ownership, a new translation of Eigenheit, the short middle section in Der Einzige und sein Eignenthum, in his book What is anarchism. Rooum inserted a note on Max Stirner at the end of the book.

== Role in the Challenor affair ==
In 1963 Rooum exposed police corruption during demonstrations against the Greek State Visit in July by King Paul of Greece and Queen Frederika. Attempts were made to outlaw the demonstrations and demonstrators were given draconian prison sentences. The government was criticised in the press for the severity of the sentences which was followed by embarrassing climb-downs. Some of the sentences were overturned on appeal and Henry Brooke, the Home Secretary, was required to make an ex gratia payment to Rooum of £500 plus expenses. Rooum recalled that, out of the £500, he was able to repay the £153/8/9 (one hundred and fifty-three pounds, 8 shillings and 9 pence) that individuals had contributed to his defence fund and make donations to the National Council for Civil Liberties, Freedom and Peace News.

Rooum proved that an offensive weapon had been planted on him. On 11 July, he had joined a demonstration against the royal party at Claridge's hotel. He held up a banner reading, "Lambrakis RIP", referring to a Greek MP and peace activist who had been murdered. According to Rooum's account, the banner was confiscated by a police officer and read by four plain clothes men. Rooum asked, "Can I have my banner back?" He was approached by one of the officers: "This big one with the short-back-and-sides stepped forward. 'Can you have your what back?' "'My banner." "He smiled at me. 'You're fucking nicked, my old beauty,' he said, and gave me a terrific clout on the ear." At the police station, the officer, Detective Sergeant Harold Challenor, "took from his pocket a screwed-up newspaper, which he opened with a flourish. Inside was a piece of brick. His smile widened. 'There you are, my old beauty. Carrying an offensive weapon. You can get two years for that.'"

Rooum was a member of the National Council of Civil Liberties and he had, by good fortune, read some material on forensic science and so gave his clothes to his defence solicitor Stanley Clinton Davis for analysis. No brick dust was found in his pocket and Rooum convinced the magistrate that therefore no brick could have been there at the time of the alleged offence. There followed a public inquiry that criticised the police and led to the imprisonment of three officers. Rooum received £500 compensation (£9,655 at 2017 value) and other convictions were overturned. Challenor was deemed mentally unfit to plead and was committed to Netherne mental hospital. A subsequent enquiry found that he had probably begun developing paranoid schizophrenia for some months before the incident, but the lack of any successful prosecution against him was seen by some as evidence of further establishment corruption.

== Cartoonist ==
In 1952, Philip Sansom invited Rooum to draw a regular cartoon strip for The Syndicalist and he contributed Scissor Bill. The name derived from an IWW name for a bosses' yes-man. From 1960, his cartoons started appearing in such outlets as She, The Daily Mirror, Private Eye and The Spectator. Rooum had a long relationship, with interruptions, with Peace News, his first work appearing for them in 1962. Originals of his cartoons for Peace News up to 1971, together with some for The Spectator, are stored at the British Cartoon Archive.

In 1974, Sansom invited Rooum to provide a cartoon for a monthly magazine he was working on, Wildcat. Rooum created a character of the same name. Wildcat ceased publication in 1975 but in 1980, when Sansom was again working on Freedom, he persuaded Rooum and the editorial collective to revive the Wildcat comic strip, which featured in every edition until Freedom ceased printing in 2014. In 2016, PM Press of California published Wildcat Anarchist Comics, a collection of his cartoons coloured by Jayne Clementson, with some autobiographical material, and the second edition of What is Anarchism?, an expanded version of the original 1992 Freedom Press edition.

Rooum drew the Sprite strip for The Skeptic magazine from 1987. Also he illustrated several books, including Don't you believe it! by John Radford. An exhibition of his work was held at Conway Hall London in 2008. Another exhibition, Emotional need, which featured Wildcat, the short film by Adam Louis-Jacob about Rooum's black and white strip cartoons for Freedom, was held at Collective Gallery in Edinburgh in 2017.

== Publications ==
=== As author and cartoonist ===
- "Gandalf's Garden" in: Outrageous Tales from the Old Testament ed: Tony Bennett, 1987, London, Knockabout Comics, ISBN 0-86166-054-4
- Wildcat Anarchist comics. London: Freedom Press. 1987. ISBN 0 900384 301.
- Wildcat: ABC of Bosses,1991, London, Freedom Press, ISBN 0-900384-60-3
- Health Service Wildcat, 1994, London, Freedom Press, ISBN 0-900384-73-5
- Twenty Year Millennium Wildcat: Anarchist Comics 1999, London, Freedom Press, ISBN 0-900384-97-2
- Wildcat: Anarchists Against Bombs, 2003, London, Freedom Press, ISBN 1-904491-01-4
- Wildcat Keeps Going, 2011, London, Freedom Press, ISBN 978-1-904491-14-9
- Wildcat Anarchist Comics, 2016 (originally 1985), Oakland CA, PM Press, ISBN 978-1-62963-1-271

=== As author ===
- "Cyril Burt's A psychological study of typography. A reappraisal". Typos: A journal of typography. 4: 37–40. 1981.
- (With James Hartley) "Sir Cyril Burt and typography: A re-evaluation". British Journal of Psychology. 74 (2): 203–212. 1983.
- "Anarchism is about individuals". Freedom. 47 (9): 56–57. 1986. ISSN 0016-0504.
- "Karl Von Frisch and the 'Spot Codes' for Marking Insects". Bee World. 70 (3): 120–126. 1989.
- "An approach to creation science". The Raven. 7 (2): 120–135. 1994.
- "Freedom, Freedom Press and Freedom Bookshop A short history of Freedom Press" (PDF). Information for Social Change. 27 (Summer). 2008.
- "Introduction". Mutual aid: A factor of evolution (4th ed.). London: Freedom Press. 2009. ISBN 1-904491-10-3.
- "Are Law Courts Biased Against Defendants?" (PDF). Ethical Record. 121 (10): 5–8. 2016.
- Richards, Vernon, ed. (2016). What is anarchism? (Second ed.). Oakland, California: PM Press. ISBN 978-1-62963-146-2.

=== As illustrator ===
- Classics of Humour (Dickens, Charles; O'Brien, Flann; Saki; Thurber, James; Twain, Mark; Waugh, Evelyn; Wilde, Oscar, Wodehouse, P G, et al., authors); O'Mara, Michael (ed), Donald Rooum (Illustrator) 1976 Book Club Associates ASIN B0010S72HK, 1976 Constable and Company ISBN 0-09-461440-7
- English Lessons One Michael Hapgood (author), Donald Rooum (illustrator); 1981 Heinemann Educational Books ISBN 0-435-10400-4
- The innocent Anthropologist by Nigel Barley (author), Donald Rooum (illustrator); 1983 British Museum Publications !SBN 0714180548
- Don't You Believe It!: Some Things Everyone Knows That Actually Ain't So by John Radford (Author), Donald Rooum (Illustrator), London 2007, Stepney Green Press, ISBN 0-9554431-0-5
- Citizenship Cartoons (2003) by Alastair Gunn (Author), Donald Rooum (Author) Classroom Resources ISBN 1-84106-789-X
