= Frank Lisle =

English painter

- Born: 1916
- Died: 1986 (aged 69–70)
- Occupations: Painter; Art teacher

Frank Lisle (1916–1986) was a British painter and art teacher, who numbered a young David Hockney among his pupils when he was Head of Art at Bradford College of Art. He became principal of Jacob Kramer College, Leeds in 1964 following the departure of Harry Thubron, in which capacity he served to 1977.

Among Lisle's portrait sitters were another pupil, anarchist Donald Rooum and Alice Bacon, MP for North-East Leeds. His work is in collections including those of The Hepworth Wakefield, and Leeds City Council.
