= Adolphus E. Graupner =

American judge (1875–1947)

Adolphus Earhart Graupner (February 3, 1875 – September 19, 1947) was a judge of the United States Board of Tax Appeals (later the United States Tax Court) from 1924 to 1926.

Born in Clinton, Iowa, Graupner graduated from the University of California in 1897, and was admitted to the bar the same year. In 1912 he was elected as a councilor to the Alumni Council. He was later an instructor in Law at UC Hastings.

He entered the practice of law until 1913, when he became a superior court judge in San Francisco, California. He served until 1915, when he left to enlist in the United States Army, in which he was an infantry captain in World War I. Upon his return, he resumed the private practice of law until his appointment to the United States Board of Tax Appeals in 1924. Graupner was one of the original twelve members appointed to the United States Board of Tax Appeals, and one of a group of seven appointed "from the public". However, he and Albert E. James were the only members not reappointed to the Board when their initial terms expired, reportedly "because of their differences of opinion with the Board’s Chairman, Jules Gilmer Korner, concerning 'administrative matters'". One editorial noted that James and Graupner, the only judges not recommended for reappointment by the Treasury Department, were the judges who decided against the Treasury in the largest number of cases.
