= Operation Speedwell =

WW2 SAS raid against Italian rail targets near Genoa (Sep 1943)

World War 2
Date	7 September 1943
Location	Genoa, Italy

Belligerents
Special Air Service	Fascist Italy

During World War II, Operation Speedwell was an early Special Air Service raid against Italian rail targets near Genoa starting on 7 September 1943. It formed part of Operation Slapstick. The fourteen-man group split into a number of smaller units to destroy track and ambush trains. The surviving raiders returned to friendly lines on foot after up to seven months behind enemy lines, some after time in captivity.
