= Albert E. James =

American judge (c. 1892–1952)

Albert Earl James (December 25, 1882 – April 24, 1952) was a judge of the United States Board of Tax Appeals (later the United States Tax Court) from 1924 to 1926.

James received an A.B. from the University of Wisconsin–Madison in 1906, followed by an A.M. from the same institution in 1908, and a Ph.D. in 1912, his doctoral thesis being titled, Financial administration of Wisconsin 1898-1910. Upon graduation, he was employed as a tax expert by the Wisconsin Tax Commission. He later installed tax accounting systems for the states of New Mexico and Virginia, and for several years was located in New York City.

As a New York and New Jersey, lawyer, accountant and tax expert, he was one of the original twelve members appointed to the Board by President Calvin Coolidge, and one of a group of seven appointed "from the public". However, he and Adolphus E. Graupner were the only members not reappointed to the Board when their initial terms expired, reportedly "because of their differences of opinion with the Board’s Chairman, Jules Gilmer Korner, concerning 'administrative matters'". One editorial noted that James and Graupner, the only two judges not recommended for reappointment by the Treasury Department, were the judges who decided against the Treasury in the largest number of cases.
