= Wild Cat Hill =

Hill in Missouri, U.S.

Coordinates: 36°41′40″N 91°22′03″W

Wild Cat Hill is a summit in Oregon County in the Ozarks of southern Missouri. It has an elevation of 922 feet (281 m). It is located about 1.5 miles east of Alton just north of US Route 160.

Wild Cat Hill was so named on account of wildcats in the area.
