= Wachita Creek =

Stream in the U.S. state of Missouri

Wachita Creek is a stream in Madison and St. Francois counties in the U.S. state of Missouri. It is a tributary of the St. Francis River.

The stream headwaters are in St. Francois County at 37°42′00″N 90°29′29″W and the confluence with the St. Francis River is in Madison County at 37°36′28″N 90°29′26″W. The stream source area lies just west of Wachita Mountain and south of Doe Run. The confluence with the St. Francis is just north of Missouri Route 72 and east of Roselle.

Variant spellings were "Washita Creek" and "Wichita Creek". The creek derives its name from the Wichita Indians.

== See also ==
- List of rivers of Missouri
