= Wildcat (comic strip) =

Anarchist comic strip by Donald Rooum

- The Revolting Pussycat
- Author(s): Donald Rooum
- Current status/schedule: Ceased
- Launch date: 1974
- End date: 2014
- Publisher(s): Freedom Press
- Genre(s): Anarchism, anthropomorphic
- Original language: English

Wildcat was a long running comic strip drawn by the cartoonist Donald Rooum which was published in the anarchist newspaper Freedom.

== Background ==
In 1974 Rooum was invited by Philip Sansom to take over the eponymously titled comic of the Wildcat newspaper. Having been drawn by another artist for three issues, Rooum introduced a new lead character in the form of a wildcat. The strip's protagonist was initially drawn as a little boy before being reimagined as a female character. Rooum's new Wildcat comic strip lasted for several issues before the newspaper ceased publication. Following the collapse of Wildcat newspaper Sansom had joined the editorial team of another newspaper Freedom and convinced Rooum to restart the comic strip for the publication, which first appeared there in January 1980. The strip would go on to run in Freedom for the next 34 years.

== Contents ==
The comic revolved around the humorous relationship of its main characters The Revolting Pussycat, the wildcat for whom the comic's title referred, and The Free-Range Egghead, depicted as an ibis. The protagonists were caricatures representing the ideas of direct action and intellectualism in anarchist thought respectively. Other political archetypes regularly occurred as characters in the strip such as a Labour Party activist based on the character of Mr. Block by Ernest Riebe.

== In other media ==
=== Anthologies ===
- Rooum, Donald (1995). Wildcat. Great Britain: Freedom Press.
- Rooum, Donald (1998). Wildcat Strikes Again. Great Britain: Freedom Press.
- Rooum, Donald (1991). Wildcat ABC of Bosses. Great Britain: Freedom Press.
- Rooum, Donald; Furmurry, Victoria N (June 1994). Health Service Wildcat. Great Britain: Freedom Press.
- Rooum, Donald (1999). Wildcat: Twenty Year Millenium. Great Britain: Freedom Press.
- Rooum, Donald (2003). Wildcat: Anarchists Against Bombs. Great Britain: Freedom Press.
- Rooum, Donald (2011). Wildcat Keeps Going. Great Britain: Freedom Press.
- Rooum, Donald (2016). Wildcat Anarchist Comics. USA: PM Press.
- Rooum, Donald (1990). Wildcat & Co (in German). Müllheim: Trafik.
- Rooum, Donald (2002). Wildcat (in Croatian). Zagreb: Što čitaš?.

=== Exhibitions ===
The 2017 exhibition 'Cartoons for Peace' at the Peace Museum featured work from the Wildcat strip.

=== Film ===
Wildcat was the subject of the 2017 animated film also titled Wildcat by the video and installation artist Adam Lewis Jacob.
