= Wildcat Creek (Grand River tributary) =

Stream in Missouri, U.S.

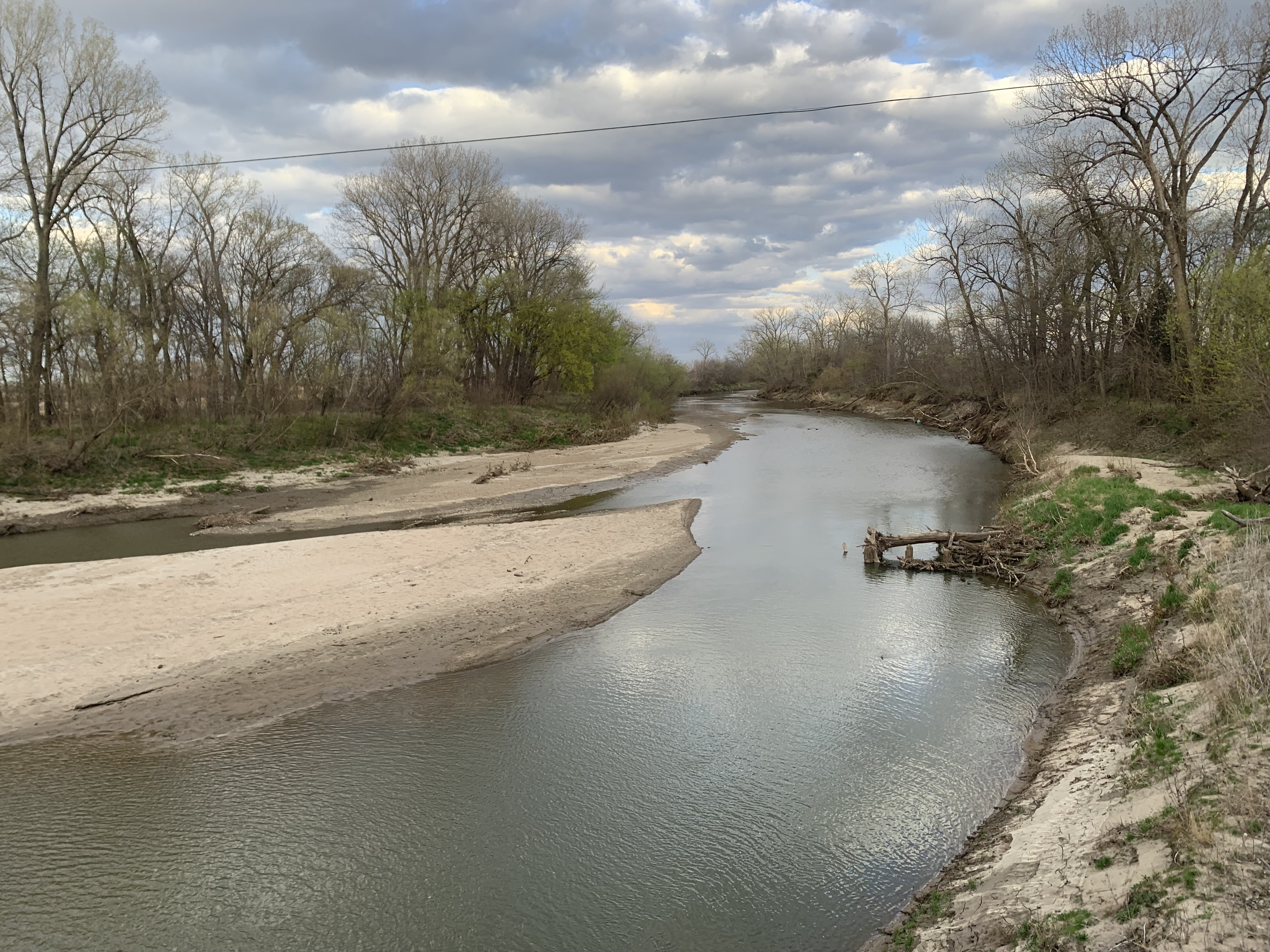
Wildcat Creek at Missouri Route H bridge in Gentry County, Missouri

Wildcat Creek is a stream in Gentry and Nodaway Counties in northwestern Missouri. It is a tributary of the Grand River.

The stream headwaters arise in eastern Nodaway County about two miles southeast of the community of Ravenwood at 40°21′00″N 94°39′03″W. The stream flows to the south and southeast passing under US Route 136 3.5 miles east of Conception where it turns to the east and enters Gentry County. The stream passes south of Stanberry and under US Route 169. The stream continues to the east and enters the Grand River 1.5 mile west of the community of McCurry at 40°12′56″N 94°26′59″W.

According to tradition, Wildcat Creek was named for a settler who was fond of eating wildcat meat.

== See also ==
- List of rivers of Missouri
