= Jimmy Justice (activist) =

American video activist

Jimmy Justice is the pseudonym of a video activist in New York City. He became well known after posting a video on YouTube in 2007 of several NYC traffic enforcement agents parking in front of fire hydrants. Since then, he has posted further videos of traffic agents breaking laws.

Justice's tactics in filming incidents have been met with some controversy by some parties, including police unions. He has acknowledged that in some situations he "want[s] to make entertaining videos," some of which have led to allegations of verbal and physical harassment from people being filmed. However, his tactics have nonetheless contributed to new policies in New York City, as Police Commissioner Raymond W. Kelly has announced that the New York City Police Department will begin accepting videos of alleged criminal activity from private citizens.
