= Wildcat (anarchist newspaper) =

English anarchist newspaper, 1974–1975

- Editor: Collective
- Categories: anarchist-libertarian newspaper
- Founded: 1974
- Final issue: 1975
- Country: United Kingdom
- Language: English
- Website: http://libcom.org/library/wildcat-london-1970s (archive)

Wildcat was a monthly anarchist-libertarian newspaper published from London between 1974 and 1975. Wildcat is not connected to the communist newsletter and journal of the same name published in the 1980s and 1990s.

== History ==
Wildcat took its name from wildcat strike action, a term that describes a strike action undertaken by unionized workers without union leadership's authorization, support, or approval.

The publication was temporarily based at 5 Caledonian Road, London, where it shared the premises with the British pacifist magazine Peace News and the radical booksellers Housmans.

Between September 1974 and July 1975, ten issues were published.

A monthly subscription to Wildcat cost £2.50 while students, pensioners and anyone claiming benefits were charged £1.50.

== Content ==
Wildcat ran regular reports, features, book reviews, a letters page, and classifieds. The second issue reported on peace campaigner Pat Arrowsmith's escape from an open prison before she took sanctuary in the premises shared by Wildcat at 5 Caledonian Road.

=== Army supplement ===
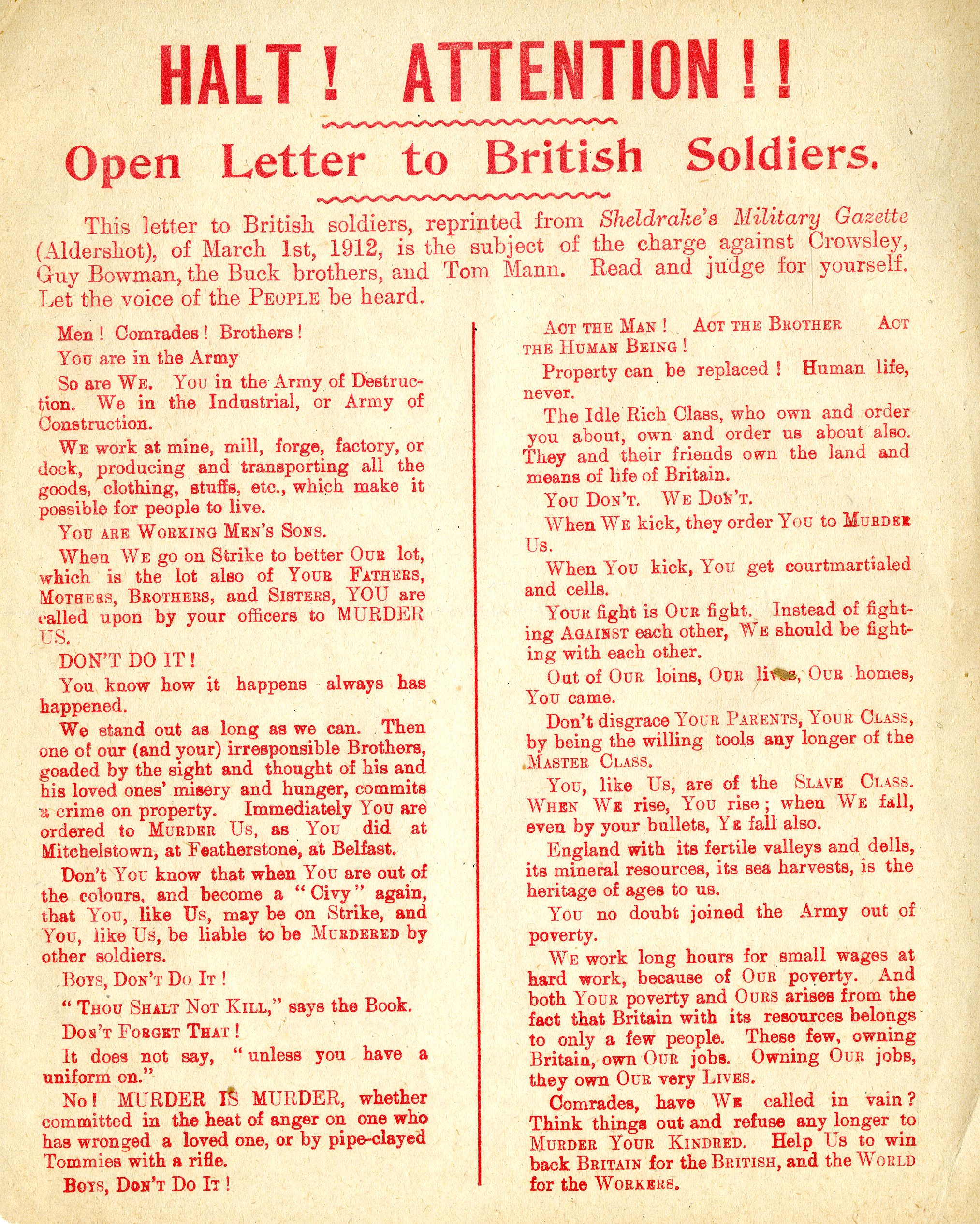
A reproduction of the original "Open Letter to British Soldiers" that was also reprinted by Wildcat in its first edition

The first edition of Wildcat included a supplement themed around disaffection, mutiny, and desertion in the British Armed Forces. The supplement reprinted an "Open Letter to British Soldiers", originally published in 1912 by The Syndicalist. The supplement also ran an article by the conscientious objector Philip Sansom who reflected on his imprisonment for incitement to disaffection. In it Samson wrote, "Soldiers are not supposed to think and it is a criminal offence to encourage them to do so."

Further contributions to the supplement came from the anarchist writer (and former soldier) Colin Ward.

=== Cartoons ===
In 1974, Philip Sansom invited anarchist cartoonist and writer Donald Rooum to provide a cartoon for Wildcat. Both the comic strip and its main character took adopted the name of the paper. Rooum recalled the creation of Wildcat's characters in an interview:

There had to be some kind of female, and thinking about that, I decided to make the wildcat female, then I thought about the contrast between the anarchists that I knew. Some of them were, like Colin Ward, very anxious for anarchism to become intellectually respectable. Some were just the opposite and wanted to go around throwing things. I thought the cat could be the wild anarchist, and the free-range egghead could be the intellectual. So that's how it started.

After Wildcat's closure, Sansom persuaded Rooum to revive the Wildcat comic strip in the anarchist newspaper Freedom where it featured until the publication ceased printing in 2014.

== Police raids ==
On 10 September 1974, the Wildcat offices at 5 Caledonian Road were raided by police officers with warrants under the Incitement to Disaffection Act. Officers confiscated one copy of Wildcat and four copies of the 'Give this to a soldier' supplement. The second edition of Wildcat reported that one officer indicated to a member of their group and said, "He's a bit of a rascal, isn't he?" An employee of Housmans responded, "There's two sides to that: he might think you were a bit of a rascal breaking into his office." The raids targeted individuals and groups connected to the British Withdrawal from Northern Ireland Campaign (BWNIC) and their 'Information for Discontented Soldiers' leafletting initiative. The BWNIC's campaign was based at 5 Caledonian Road and the arrest of Pat Arrowsmith had taken place at the address two days prior to the raids.

== Contributors ==
- Judy Greenway (author)
- Wynford Hicks (journalist)
- Donald Rooum (anarchist cartoonist and writer)
- Philip Sansom (anarchist and conscientious objector)
- Nicolas Walter (anarchist)
- Colin Ward (anarchist writer)

== Archives ==
Online anarchist archive Libcom.org published two editions of Wildcat and its army supplement. Further material has been published online by The Anarchist Library. An article titled 'Questioning our Desires' originally ran in the sixth edition of Wildcat and was published online by its author Judy Greenway.
