= Wachita Mountain =

Summit in the US state of Missouri

Coordinates: 37°40′13″N 90°28′19″W

Wachita Mountain is a summit in southern St. Francois County in the U.S. state of Missouri. The summit has an elevation of 1,027 feet (313 m). The broad hill lies about four miles southeast of Doe Run and the St. Francis River flows past the southeast side of the mountain. Klondike Hill lies adjacent to the northeast. Missouri Route AA traverses across the hill from northeast to southwest. The extreme south end of the mountain extends into northern Madison County.

The name, like that of Wachita Creek, which arises on the southwest slope of the mountain, derives from a variant spelling Wichita, from the Wichita people.
