= Newcastle Arena =

Multi-purpose indoor arena in England

Utilita Arena Newcastle
- Newcastle Arena

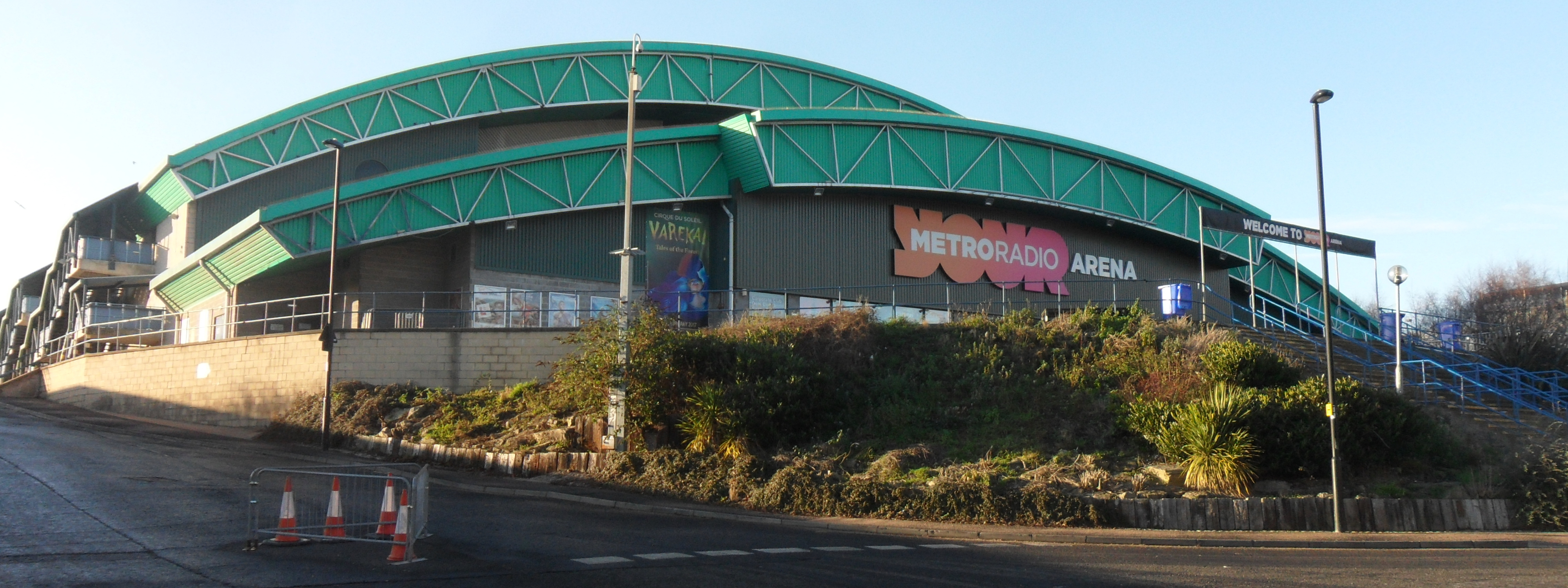
- The main entrance under old signage (2016)
- Interactive map of Utilita Arena Newcastle
- Former names: Newcastle Arena (1995–1997); Telewest Arena (1997–2004); Metro Radio Arena (2004–2019)
- Location: Newcastle upon Tyne, England
- Coordinates: 54°57′50″N 1°37′24″W
- Owner: ASM Global
- Operator: ASM Global
- Capacity: Concerts: 11,000; Basketball: 6,500; Ice hockey: 5,500; Pro Wrestling: 11,000

Construction
- Opened: 18 November 1995
- Cost: £10.6m
- Architect: Ogden Corporation

Website
- www.utilitaarena.co.uk

The Newcastle Arena (currently known for sponsorship reasons as the Utilita Arena) is an indoor arena in the city of Newcastle upon Tyne, England. Owned and operated by ASM Global, the naming rights are currently held by Utilita Energy.

Having also had various professional basketball and ice hockey teams as tenants for much of its history, since 2009 it has had no ice hockey team after the departure of the Newcastle Vipers to the Whitley Bay Ice Rink, and no basketball team since the departure of the Newcastle Eagles to Northumbria University's Sport Central arena in 2010.

== History ==
Two well known local musicians conceived and helped build the arena, Chas Chandler and his business partner Nigel Stanger, together with invaluable help from local Price Waterhouse Corporate Finance partner John Wall. The NYSE listed Ogden Corporation was awarded a 20-year contract in February 1995 to design the arena, and once completed, to manage the facility including booking and promotion. According to Ogden, the arena clearly filled a market opportunity for touring acts who had otherwise bypassed the area, with the next nearest local venue being the 2,000 seat Newcastle City Hall, and the only other medium-sized venues being as far away as Sheffield to the south or Glasgow to the north. Acts that did visit the region often had to make use of the 3,200 seat Whitley Bay Ice Rink.

The arena cost £10.6m to build (partly financed by a £2.5 million grant from Tyne & Wear Development Corporation), and opened as the Newcastle Arena on Saturday 18 November 1995 with a basketball league game between the resident team the Newcastle Comets, hosting the Doncaster Panthers. The venue was officially opened by Torvill and Dean in January 1998.

The Ogden Corporation assumed full ownership of the arena after Chandler and Stanger sold their stakes in Park Arena Limited. Chandler died in 1996 while Stanger died in 1999. In 1997 the arena was renamed the Telewest Arena after a sponsorship deal with the telecommunications and cable-television company Telewest. In 2000 the Ogden Corporation sold the arena to SMG for $240m.

In January 2004 the arena was renamed as the Metro Radio Arena after a new sponsorship deal was signed with the independent local station Metro Radio. The seven figure deal was to last a minimum of three years. By 2005, the end of the first decade of operation, seven million people had attended events at the arena.

In 2008 plans drawn up by consultants working for Newcastle City Council and the land-owning stake-holders, SMG, Bellway Homes, Network Rail and Isle Casinos, were to be presented to the council, outlining three redevelopment options for the arena site: a casino and regional conference centre, a hotel, or mixed use office and housing, with the arena building potentially being demolished or upgraded as part of the proposal.

In January 2026, venue management company Legends Global confirmed plans to significantly invest in the arena as part of a broader investment programme across several major UK arenas. This will fund the modernisation of the arena, which will include a new mezzanine floor with premium lounges and a dedicated VIP entrance alongside upgrades to its technology, artist dressing rooms and concourse bars. The overall capacity will also be increased by 20%.

== Design ==
According to ASM Global, the open span arena is the largest concert and exhibition venue in the north east. It has 40,000 square feet (3,700 m^{2}) of exhibition and conference space. For concerts, it has a seating capacity of 11,000 and more, while for basketball it can seat 6,500 and for ice shows, 5,500. A further 36,000 square metres of space is available for large events and exhibitions. In addition to the main arena, there are also two 100 capacity corporate lounges. The large foyer area previously housed two venues called the Mayfair and Riverside. The arena site also has a 600 space secure parking facility.

== Location ==
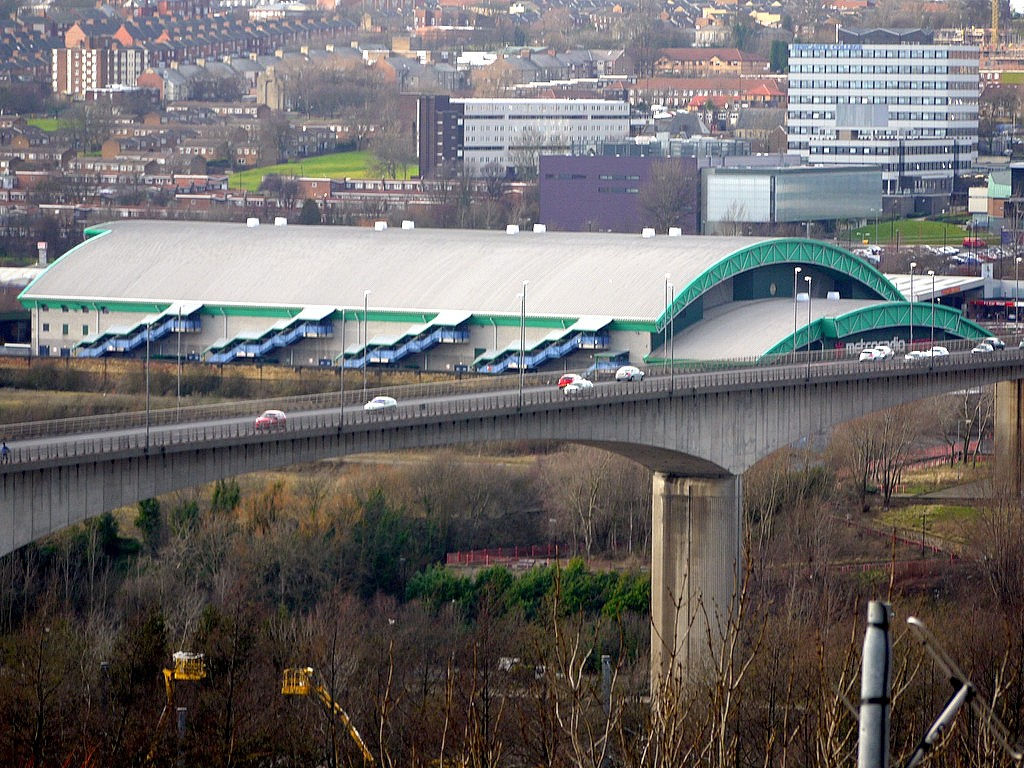
Redheugh Bridge and Newcastle Arena (2012)

Situated on the South-Western edge of Newcastle city centre, the arena is loosely bounded to the south by the River Tyne, to the west by a business park, to the east by the elevated Redheugh Bridge which runs across the river, and to the north by the major thoroughfares of the Scotswood Road and West Road, connecting the city centre to its western districts.

The arena is oriented on an east–west alignment, with the main entrance located in the east wall. Steps lead down to a local north–south running street, Redheugh Bridge road, which is actually parallel to, and below, the actual bridge and was the road to the old Redheugh Bridge.

== Operator ==
The arena is both owned and operated by ASM Global. Caroline James is the general manager of the arena. Security is provided by Showsec and First Aid is provided by ShowMed.

ASM Global will also be the operators of The Sage arena development on Gateshead Quayside.

=== Ice hockey ===
The first ice-hockey team to take residence at the arena was the Whitley Warriors, but they left after just a few months.

The Arena was used by the Newcastle Cobras ice hockey team from August 1996. The Cobras were the former Durham Wasps, who had been bought by Newcastle businessman John Hall, owner of Newcastle United football club. Hall's intention was to move the team to a new venue in Newcastle near the football team's ground St James' Park, as part of his wider Sporting Club vision for the city. After failing to get planning permission, after a season spent in Sunderland still as the Wasps, the team instead moved into the newly built Arena, and began the 1996/97 season as the Cobras. Due to changes of ownership, after two years the team was renamed the Newcastle Riverkings, before again being renamed as the Newcastle Jesters. The Jesters played for a single season in 2000/01 before being shut down. The Sunderland Chiefs who originally played out of Crowtree Leisure Centre in Sunderland also played their last season out of the Arena in 2000/2001.

After a year without ice hockey, a new franchise named the Newcastle Vipers was formed for the start of the 2002/03 season, and used the arena as their home rink. After suffering financial difficulties and being unable to attract enough spectators to afford the rent, the Vipers moved home mid-season in November 2009, leaving the arena to move to Whitley Bay Ice Rink, as tenants of the Warriors. While the club were hopeful of a return to the arena, a permanent home in Gateshead was also mooted, with redevelopment proposals tabled during early 2010. A hoped for return to the arena for the 2010/11 season did not occur, as it could not guarantee sufficient dates due to problems with the ageing ice making equipment, seeing the club commit to staying at Whitley Bay.

=== Basketball ===
The arena opened with a resident basketball team in the Newcastle Comets, having been relocated from Sunderland where they had played as the Sunderland Scorpions. In 1996, the Comets were bought by John Hall as part of the Sporting Club project. Having spent just one season as the Comets in the arena, the team were renamed the Newcastle Eagles for the start of the 1996–97 season.

In September 2010, after 14 years at the Arena, the Eagles moved to Northumbria University's newly built Sport Central development featuring a 3,000 capacity arena, located in their campus in the north east part of the city centre. While having the arena's capacity had been part of the reason why the team went from an under-performing side to British Basketball League champions for which the team were thankful, part of the reason for the move was that due to clashes with Friday night concerts the team would have to play away from home, leading to lost revenue, with the final season seeing the team go on the road for three straight months, while the arena hosted the musical Mamma Mia!. The move also offered improved training arrangements, and enhanced pre-existing links with the university teams. The team had also only been averaging 3,000 crowds in the arena, which could hold 6,500.

== Events ==
The arena has been used since 1997 to host an annual convention of Jehovah's Witnesses. Local worshippers, as well as some from as far north as the Scottish Borders, as far south as North Yorkshire and as far west as Maryport, on the west coast of Cumbria, flock for the 3-day event in June; around 7,000 attend in total.

Other sporting events hosted by the arena have included Nations Cup snooker, Davis Cup tennis, world championship boxing and WWE Live Events and most notably their 2003 Pay Per View, Insurrextion.

Many prominent British boxers have fought at the Arena. The first major boxing event featured Nigel Benn being defeated in a WBC Super Middleweight title defence. In 1996 Prince Naseem Hamed defended his WBO Super Featherweight title. In 1999, Joe Calzaghe defended his WBO Super Middleweight title and Richie Woodhall defended his WBC Super Middleweight title on the same night. In 2001 Audley Harrison fought in his second professional bout. In 2002 Joe Calzaghe again defended his WBO title while Ricky Hatton headlined the card defending his WBU Light Welterweight title. In 2009 Amir Khan defended his WBA Light Welterweight title in a Sky Box Office Pay Per View event. In 2014 Stuart Hall twice defended his IBF Bantamweight title, losing his title in the second bout with Paul Butler. In 2015, future heavyweight champion Anthony Joshua headlined a live Sky Sports event. In 2017 former world champion Liam Smith is scheduled to face Liam Williams in a rematch and WBO Light Middleweight title eliminator live on BT Sport.

Since 2007, it has played host to the Premier League Darts.

The Arena has also hosted major Mixed Martial Arts events, including UFC 80: Rapid Fire in 2008 featuring B.J. Penn's Lightweight Championship win. BAMMA 12 was hosted in 2013, while Cage Warriors 62 in 2013 and 73 in 2014 were also held at the Arena.

The arena has hosted many top acts of the music industry, including solo artists such as Janet Jackson, Shania Twain, Bryan Adams, Beyoncé, Destiny's Child, Rihanna, Leona Lewis, Britney Spears, Bruno Mars, Christina Aguilera, Toni Braxton, Elton John, Tom Jones, Pavarotti, Linkin Park, Katy Perry, Robbie Williams, Kylie Minogue, Gabrielle, Whitney Houston, Nicki Minaj, Lady Gaga, Justin Bieber, Justin Timberlake, Diana Ross, Cher, Mark Knopfler and bands/groups such as McFly, The Backstreet Boys, Oasis, Snow Patrol, KISS, Metallica, Journey, Coldplay, Imagine Dragons, Westlife, Take That, Spice Girls, Michael Bublé, JLS, The Saturdays, Girls Aloud, Wet Wet Wet, The Wanted, Little Mix, One Direction, All Saints, AC/DC, Iron Maiden, and Dua Lipa. The first concert at the arena is commonly assumed to have been by David Bowie shortly after opening, on 7 December 1995, although the actual first performers at the venue were local duo The Proud Ones, who filled in for Morrissey after he cancelled his appearance.

The arena was also the venue that hosted the first two nights of Take That's sold out comeback tour, The Ultimate Tour.

The Arena has hosted a number of all-night dance events under the name of Godskitchen, many world-class DJ's such as Tiesto, Armin van Buuren, Mauro Picotto, Judge Jules and Ferry Corsten have played in the venue to sellout crowds.

The arena has also hosted various stage events, and on 10 November 2010, Michael Flatley came to the arena during the European tour of 'The Return of Michael Flatley as the Lord of the Dance, he and his troupe performed in front of a sold-out audience, and Les Misérables came to the arena. Business events hosted have included trade exhibitions, corporate events and company meetings for BT Group and Northern Rock. The exterior space has also been used to stage events such as live-action motor sport displays and a circus.

On Monday 18 June 2012, it played host to the Newcastle audition stages of the ninth series of the ITV singer search programme The X Factor. The eventual winner of the series, James Arthur, auditioned here.

== Transport ==
In addition to road access provided by the nearby major thoroughfares, the arena is 10 minutes’ walk from Newcastle railway station to the east, for National Rail and Tyne & Wear Metro services. Some local public transport bus services pass the arena on the northern side, on Railway Street, although most services use the major roads further north.
