= Wildcat Creek (Munkers Creek tributary) =

Stream in Kansas, U.S.

Coordinates: 38°45′20″N 96°28′20″W

Wildcat Creek is a stream in the U.S. state of Kansas. It is a tributary to Munkers Creek.

Wildcat Creek was named for the wildcats which once were abounded in the area.
