= Streatham Ice and Leisure Centre =

Leisure centre in Streatham, England

Coordinates: 51.4248°N 0.1308°W

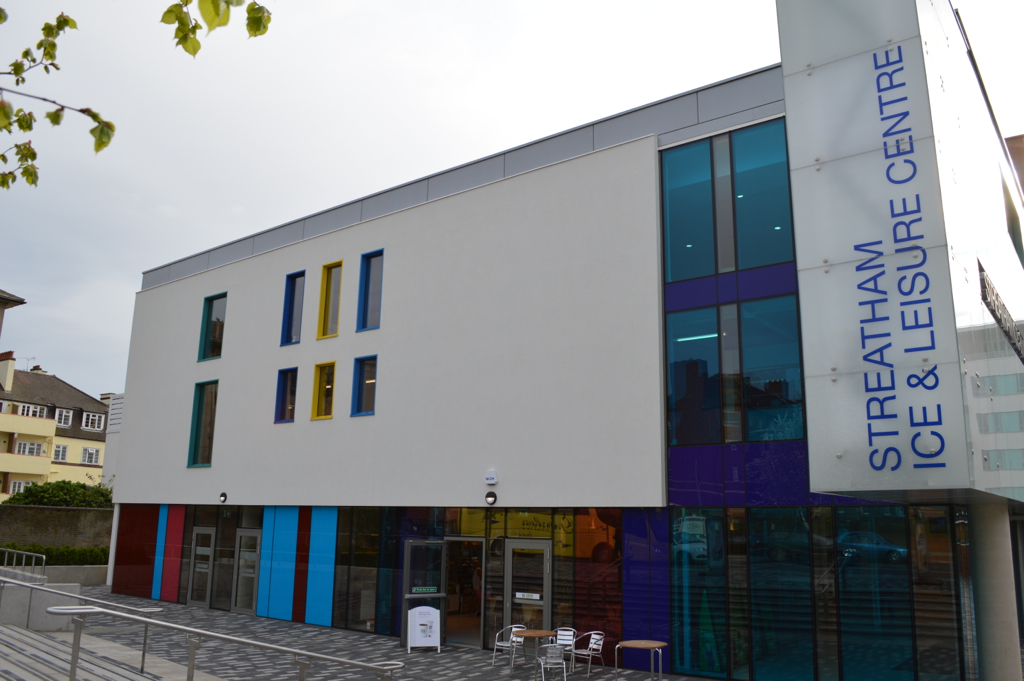
Streatham Ice and Leisure Centre

Streatham Ice and Leisure Centre is an ice rink and leisure centre in Streatham, south London. It is the only Olympic-sized skating rink in the city, and is the home ice of the Streatham IHC and Streatham Storm ice hockey teams. It replaced the older Streatham Ice Arena.

== Streatham Ice Arena ==
Streatham Ice Arena was originally opened on the site on 26 February 1931 by the Mayor of Wandsworth, Lt Col. A. Bellamy, and the Member of Parliament for Streatham, Sir William Lane-Mitchell.

During the Second World War, the arena was closed to the public and was used as a food storage centre.

In 1962, the arena was purchased by the Mecca entertainments company, who spent almost £350,000 on various improvements including a restaurant and cocktail bar, and renamed the rink as Silver Blades, it being one of several in a chain of Silver Blades ice rinks that the company operated in the UK. A further £1 million was spent refurbishing the rink in 1980.

However, by the end of the twentieth century the building was proving very expensive to maintain and it had begun to fall into disrepair. During its last years, the arena was in substandard condition from a safety point of view, and would have required extensive refurbishment, including to the curved ceiling, to remain operative. In 2001, Tesco bought the site in preparation for a proposed multi-million pound Streatham Hub development, which was to include not only a new Olympic sized ice rink but also a public leisure centre with a 50 metre long swimming pool, 250 homes and a large Tesco store.

The arena finally closed on 18 December 2011, was demolished, and later replaced by the mixed-use development complex which opened to the public on 18 November 2013. To cover the time until the new ice rink opened, a smaller, temporary ice rink was built two miles away in Brixton.

=== Gallery ===
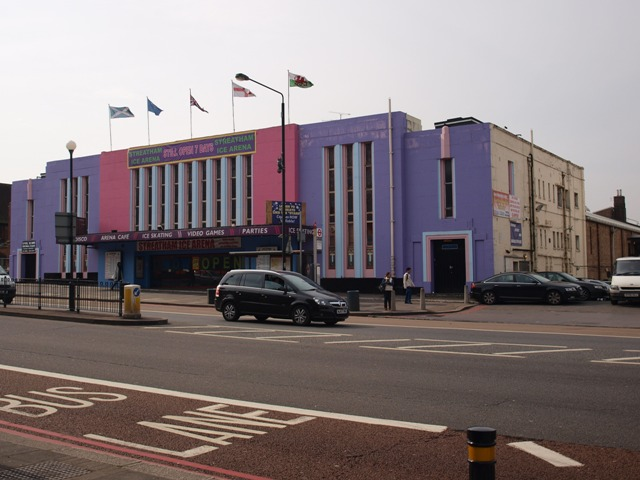
The original Streatham Ice Arena

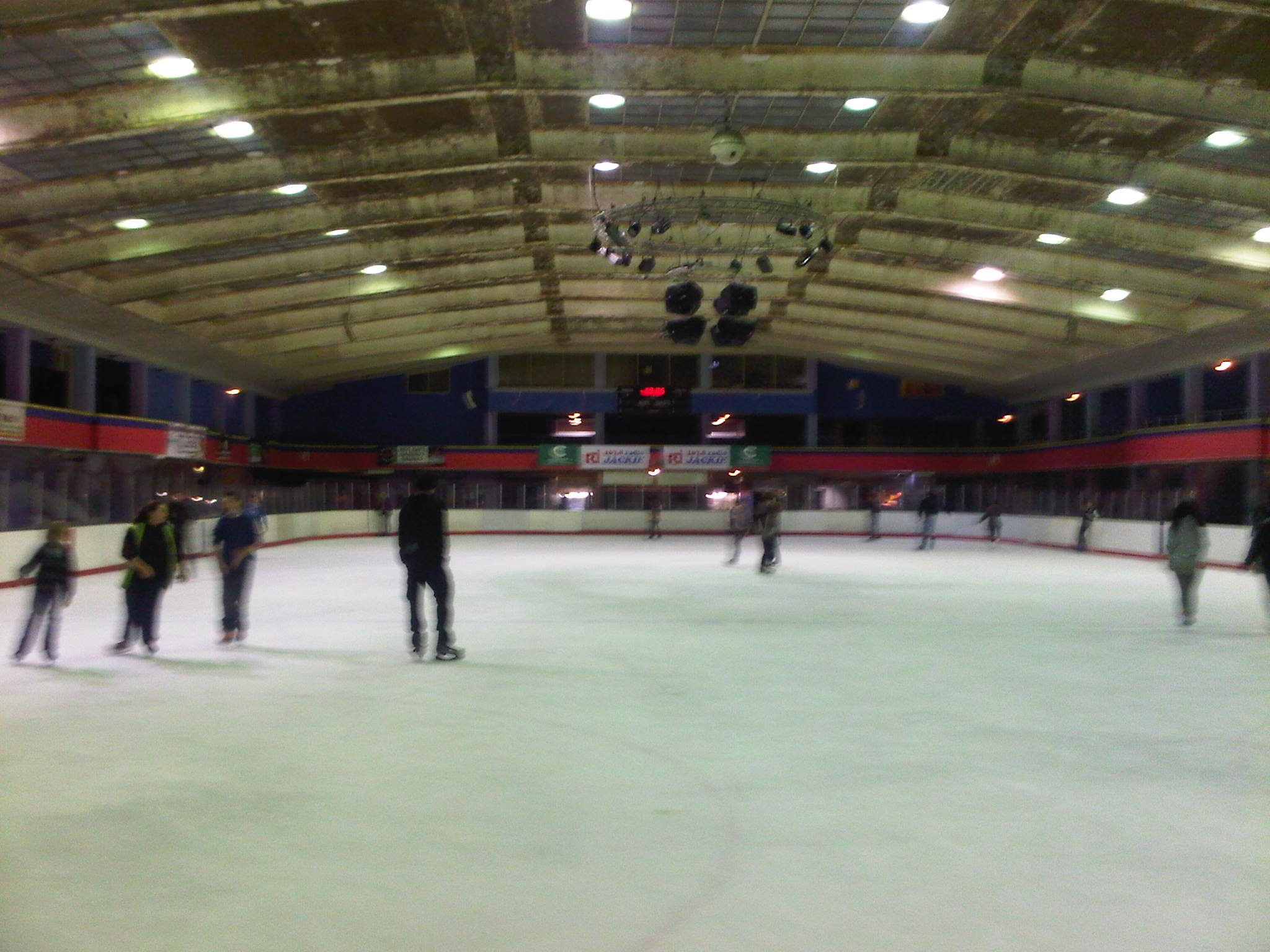
Streatham Ice Arena indoor ice rink

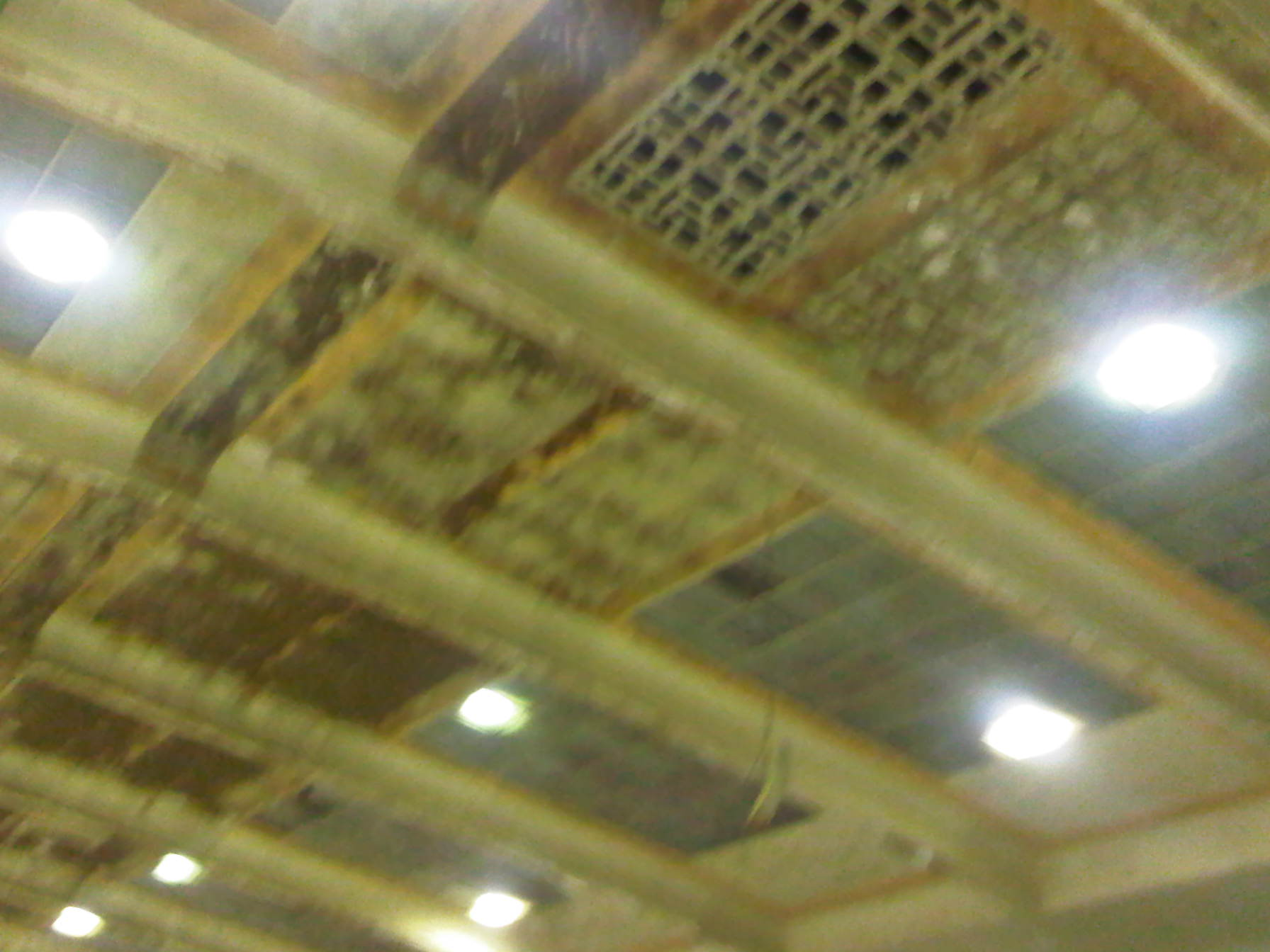
Streatham Ice Arena ceiling
