= Whitley Bay Ice Rink =

Sports venue in Whitley Bay, England

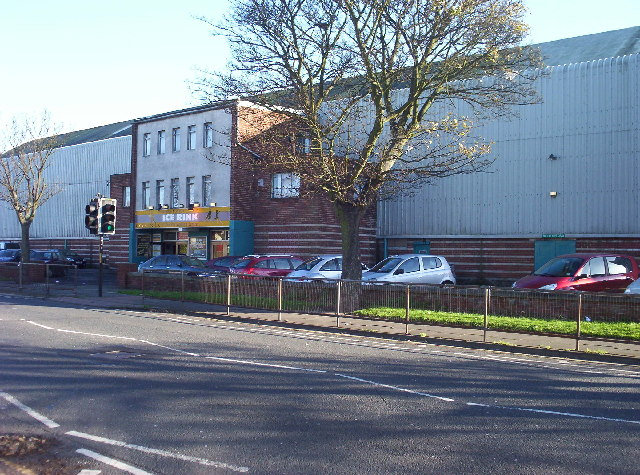
- Interactive map of Whitley Bay Ice Rink
- Location: Whitley Bay
- Coordinates: 55°2′9″N 1°27′18″W
- Capacity: 3,200

Construction
- Opened: 1955

Tenant
- Various - See 'About'

Website
- www.whitleybayicerink.co.uk

Whitley Bay Ice Rink is an ice rink located in Whitley Bay, Tyne and Wear, England and is the home of the Whitley Warriors ice hockey team. An additional team played out of the ice rink, the Newcastle Vipers, who are now disbanded. It is one of two permanent public ice rinks in the north east of England. A ten-pin bowling centre in the area upstairs which was added in the 1960s was closed in 2007. This area (as of 2019) is now home to a newly refurbished entertainment suite and conference facility.

== About ==
It was also the region's premier concert venue, until the Newcastle Arena opened in 1995. Artists that have performed at the venue include Status Quo, AC/DC, The Cure, Wham!, Iron Maiden, Kiss, Metal Church, Metallica, Kylie Minogue, New Kids on the Block, Oasis, Pet Shop Boys, Sting, The Stone Roses and Take That, among others.

Surprisingly, Whitley Bay Ice Rink has only ever held one professional boxing event - Chris Eubank KO’d Jose Ignacio Barruetebana in just 55 farcical seconds in a main event of that 1995 show. However, the WWE then WWF held three wrestling house shows at the rink in 1993 with wrestlers such as The Undertaker, Shawn Michaels, Bret Hart, Randy Savage, Razor Ramon, Diesel, Ted Dibiase and Yokozuna appearing. As with concerts the WWE now does all of its Newcastle shows in the larger Utilita Arena.

In 2005, the ice rink was used to film BBC sitcom Thin Ice. Even though the series was set in Derby, Whitley Bay Ice Rink was chosen because the production company had used the venue on numerous occasions in the past. Although reference is made to Whitley Bay as the host of the British Championships in the programme, no mention is made in the credits.

In 2006, the ice rink was criticized by local authorities after demonstrating exceedingly poor fire regulations when a blaze was discovered. Skaters continued on the ice whilst the fire escalated.

2008 saw the rink undertake several improvements, such as new barriers and plexiglass, bench doors for hockey players and a new Zamboni (an ice resurfacer).

The Newcastle Vipers played their remaining home games at Whitley Bay ice rink due to the Utilita Arena not participating in holding sports events anymore. This stopped when the Vipers ceased operation at the end of the 2010/11 season.

Whitley Bay Beacons, the rinks all female team play out of the rink, hosting 3 teams across various levels. Their First team plays in the WNIHL Elite division, Second team Plays in WNIHL Div 2 and their third team in the organisation is their Under 16s Development Squad.

Whitley Bay Ice Rink is also host to grass roots ice hockey teams, ranging from Whitley Bay Junior Development teams to recreational teams and university squads.

Junior System:

- Under 8s
- Under 10s
- Under 12s
- Under 16s
- Under 18s

Recreational teams- [training nights]

- Whitley Bay Islanders [Monday and Thursday]
- Tyneside Jesters [Thursday]
- Newcastle Coyotes [Friday]
- Whitley Bay Sharks [Friday]
- Whitley Wildcats [Saturday]
- North East Nomads [Saturday]
- Newcastle Predators [Sunday]
