= USS Wild Cat =

Tender of the United States Navy

History

United States
- Acquired: 1862
- In service: 1862
- Out of service: 1865
- Captured: by the Union Navy, 1862
- Fate: Sold, 28 July 1865

General characteristics
- Displacement: 30 tons
- Propulsion: sail

USS Wild Cat was a captured Confederate schooner acquired by the Union Navy from the prize court during the American Civil War. She was put into service by the Union Navy to patrol navigable waterways of the Confederacy to prevent the South from trading with other countries.

== Service history ==
Wild Cat—a wooden-hulled schooner captured by the Federal Navy in 1862—served as a tender to warships of the South Atlantic Blockading Squadron. The vessel was never labeled, and records of her construction and capture have not been found. Her activities and actual duties during that tour are not described in any detail in the available records, but it is known that she operated from St. Helena, North Carolina, to Port Royal, South Carolina.

During that service, she assisted refugees from a plantation attacked by Confederate marauders. On 13 June, Wild Cat sailed up to Hutchinson's Island, off St. Helena Sound, in company with the gig from the sloop-of-war USS Dale, Lt. W. T. Truxtun, commanding, to investigate a large fire ashore. Upon arrival in the vicinity, the Union sailors found the burning Marsh Plantation, set afire by a marauding Confederate band. The Southern troops had plundered the belongings of the poor negroes there, wounding some, generally striking terror into the hearts of the inhabitants. As Wild Cat sailed up the river, she came in contact with many canoes paddled by panic-stricken former inhabitants of the plantation. Lt. Truxtun soon placed all of the refugees on board Wild Cat and had them transported out of the area. A few days later, while reconnoitering the vicinity, Wild Cat shelled some Confederate raiders spotted near the Ashepoo River.

Wild Cat continued to operate in South Carolina's coastal waters through March 1865. After a brief spell as pilot boat at Charleston, South Carolina, in April, the schooner was transferred to the Union Army on 15 April 1865. Apparently returned to the Navy within three months time, Wild Cat was sold at Charleston on 28 July 1865. Her subsequent fate is unknown.

== See also ==
- Blockade runners of the American Civil War
- Blockade mail of the Confederacy
