= Arthur James (judge) =

British judge

Sir Arthur Evan James, PC, DL (18 May 1916 – 13 May 1976) was a British judge and was a member of the Court of Appeal from 1973 to his death.

== Early life ==
James was educated at Caterham School and then at Jesus College, Oxford where he obtained a double first in law followed, in 1939, by a BCL. He joined Middle Temple and was called to the bar in 1939. He married in 1939 and had four children. He joined the army as a private in the Pioneer Corps before being commissioned in the Royal Corps of Signals.

== Judicial career ==
He was appointed QC in 1960, Recorder of Grimsby (1961–1963) and Recorder of Derby (1963–1965). He received considerable public attention in 1963 when he appeared for the prosecution in the Great Train Robbery trial.

In 1964, James was asked to chair the statutory inquiry into the circumstances surrounding the Metropolitan Police's Detective Sergeant Harold Challenor's being able to plant evidence and assault suspects. In 1965, he was appointed a High Court Judge, assigned to the Queen's Bench Division. He received the customary knighthood on his appointment. He was elected to an honorary fellowship of Jesus College in 1972. He was promoted to the Court of Appeal in 1973 and was sworn as a member of the Privy Council accordingly.

He had a reputation as a hard-working judge. When he was a member of the Court of Appeal, it was once said (albeit with some exaggeration) that James made more decisions on criminal cases than the rest of his fellow judges put together, when taking into account decisions made without open court hearings.

He was a member of the Parole Board from its foundation in 1967 to 1970 (serving as deputy-chairman in 1970). He chaired the 1971 Tribunal of Enquiry into the failure of the Vehicle and General Insurance Company. He later led the committee considering the distribution of work between the Crown Court and the magistrates' courts, which reported in 1976.

He was appointed deputy lieutenant for the County of Warwickshire in 1967, and was a trustee of the Barber Institute of Fine Arts from 1974 until his death.

He always considered himself to be a Birmingham man and continued to live there despite his judicial appointments in various locations.
