= Wildcat, West Virginia =

- Unincorporated community
- Location within West Virginia Location within the United States
- Coordinates: 38°45′12″N 80°26′17″W
- Country: United States
- State: West Virginia
- County: Lewis
- Elevation: 1,001 ft (305 m)
- Time zone: UTC-5 (Eastern (EST))
  - Summer (DST): UTC-4 (EDT)
- ZIP codes: 26460
- Area codes: 304 & 681
- GNIS feature ID: 1549989

Wildcat is an unincorporated community in Lewis County, West Virginia, United States. Wildcat is located along the Little Kanawha River and County Route 50, 20 miles (32 km) south-southeast of Weston.

The community was named after the wildcat native to the area.
