= Webster Sycamore =

American sycamore tree in West Virginia

- A photograph of the Webster Sycamore published in Castanea (1955) with four men standing at the base of its trunk, demonstrating the scale of the large tree

- Location within West Virginia
- Species: American sycamore (Platanus occidentalis)
- Location: Near Webster Springs, West Virginia, US
- Coordinates: 38°31′04.2″N 80°21′23.6″W
- Date seeded: before 1508 AD
- Date felled: 2010
- Custodian: Pardee and Curtin Lumber Company

The Webster Sycamore (alternatively known as the Webster Springs Sycamore and the Big Sycamore Tree) was an American sycamore (Platanus occidentalis) in the U.S. state of West Virginia. Long recognized for its size, the Webster Sycamore was the largest living American sycamore tree in West Virginia until its felling in 2010. The tree stood approximately 4.5 miles (7.2 km) east of Webster Springs in Webster County, in a moist flood plain along the banks of the Back Fork Elk River, a tributary stream of the Elk River.

The Webster Sycamore reached a tree height measurement of 112 feet (34 m), a tree crown measurement of 90 feet (27 m), and a circumference of 25.75 feet (7.85 m) at breast height. In 1955, the American Forests Association declared the tree the largest of its species in the United States. It only held the title for three weeks, before the association identified a larger American sycamore in Maryland. Despite losing its national title, the sycamore remained the largest American sycamore in West Virginia. Following a 1963 survey of large trees in West Virginia, the Webster Sycamore was named the second-largest tree after a white oak (Quercus alba) in Randolph County.

The land upon which the Webster Sycamore was located was owned by the Pardee and Curtin Lumber Company, which spared the tree during its lumber operations in the area during the 1950s. West Virginia University biologist W. H. Gillespie averred that the tree stood as "a memorial of the original virgin forest". The Pardee and Curtin Lumber Company preserved the land surrounding the tree as a park, known as Big Sycamore Park. During the annual events Webster Wildwater Weekend in April and the Webster County Nature Weekend in May, hiking excursions were led to the Webster Sycamore.

On September 3, 2007, a malicious fire was set in the base of the Webster Sycamore's trunk. The tree survived the blaze, but suffered irreparable damage. The West Virginia Division of Forestry performed a safety and risk assessment of the tree, and determined that structural mitigation was not feasible, and that the Webster Sycamore was to be "considered an extreme hazard". In January 2008, a 17-year-old suspect from Bergoo was formally charged with a felony count of arson for setting fire to the tree. Following the fire, experts recommended that the Webster Sycamore be felled or fenced off as a safety measure. According to the Division of Forestry, the tree was finally brought down during the summer of 2010. At the time of its death, the tree was estimated to be over 500 years old.

== Geography and setting ==
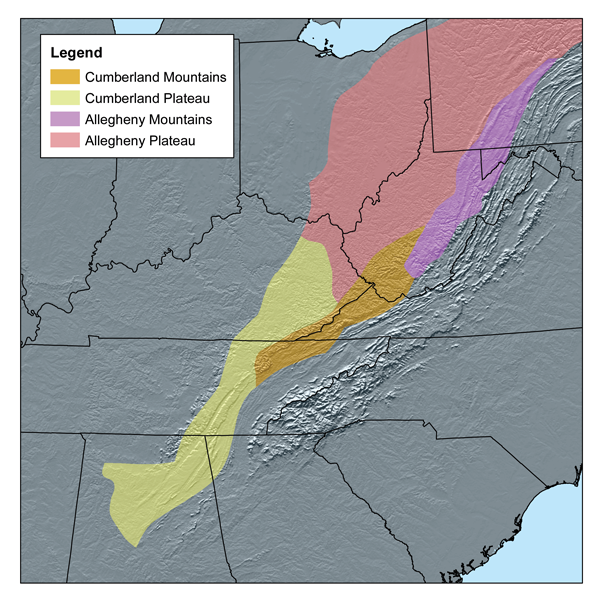
A map illustrating the Allegheny Mountain Range in relation to the Allegheny Plateau and Cumberland Mountain Range of the Appalachian Mountains

Prior to the arrival of European American settlers and explorers, the Allegheny Mountain Range of the Appalachian Mountains was overlaid with old-growth forests consisting predominantly of deciduous hardwood trees, which were characterized by individual trees of enormous size and girth. The American sycamore (Platanus occidentalis) was one of the species of trees that proliferated throughout these old-growth forests. American sycamores can grow at least 100 feet (30 m) in height and the species is distributed throughout the Eastern United States. It usually thrives in moist soils along streams, especially in sandy loam soils. American sycamores are a dominant species in bottomland and riparian forests. The species is present throughout every county in West Virginia, and is most abundant along the state's streams.

Formerly West Virginia's largest American sycamore, the Webster Sycamore (alternatively known as the Webster Springs Sycamore and the Big Sycamore Tree) was located in a moist flood plain along the banks of the Back Fork Elk River, a tributary stream of the Elk River, in Webster County. The tree was located approximately 4.5 miles (7.2 km) east of Webster Springs.

== Dimensions, age, and recognition ==
=== Dimensions and age ===
Various measurements were taken of the tree during the latter part of its lifetime; however, measurements of the circumference differ. In 1955, the tree's circumference at breast height, when measured 4.5 feet (1.4 m) from the ground, was 24 feet 8 inches (7.52 m). At a tree fork 45 feet (14 m) from the ground, its trunk measured 4.33 feet (1.32 m) in diameter. The trunk stood to a height of 82 feet (25 m), where it had been decapitated by a previous windstorm. The tree's horizontal canopy spread measured approximately 75 feet (23 m) in width. The lowest limb of the sycamore was 23.5 feet (7.2 m) from the ground, and measured 2 feet (0.61 m) in diameter. According to official measurements in 1963, however, the diameter at breast height of the Webster Sycamore, when measured 4.5 feet (1.4 m) from the ground, was more than 7 feet (2.1 m) and its circumference measured 23 feet (7.0 m). The sycamore was estimated to be at least 120 feet (37 m) in height. Its trunk measured approximately 5 feet (1.5 m) in diameter when measured 90 feet (27 m) from the forest floor.

According to the West Virginia Division of Forestry and West Virginia Humanities Council in 2002 and the West Virginia Big Tree Program in 2011, the Webster Sycamore was the largest American sycamore in West Virginia, with a height of 112 feet (34 m), a tree crown measurement of 90 feet (27 m), and a circumference of 25.75 feet (7.85 m) at breast height.

By the time of its felling in 2010, the Webster Sycamore was estimated to be over 500 years in age.

=== Other physical characteristics ===
In 1955, an eastern hemlock (Tsuga canadensis) measuring 5.5 feet (1.7 m) in height grew from a rotten knothole in the tree's main south fork. By 1963, the hemlock that had taken root in the tree's south fork remained. In describing the growth of the hemlock from an upper tree fork of the Webster Sycamore, writer William C. Blizzard referenced the idiom of Pelion piled upon Ossa. No tree hollows or visible outer blemishes were reported on the sycamore at that time; however, by 2007, the tree's trunk had developed an opening into its hollow center at its base, which allowed visitors to step inside of it.

=== Recognition ===
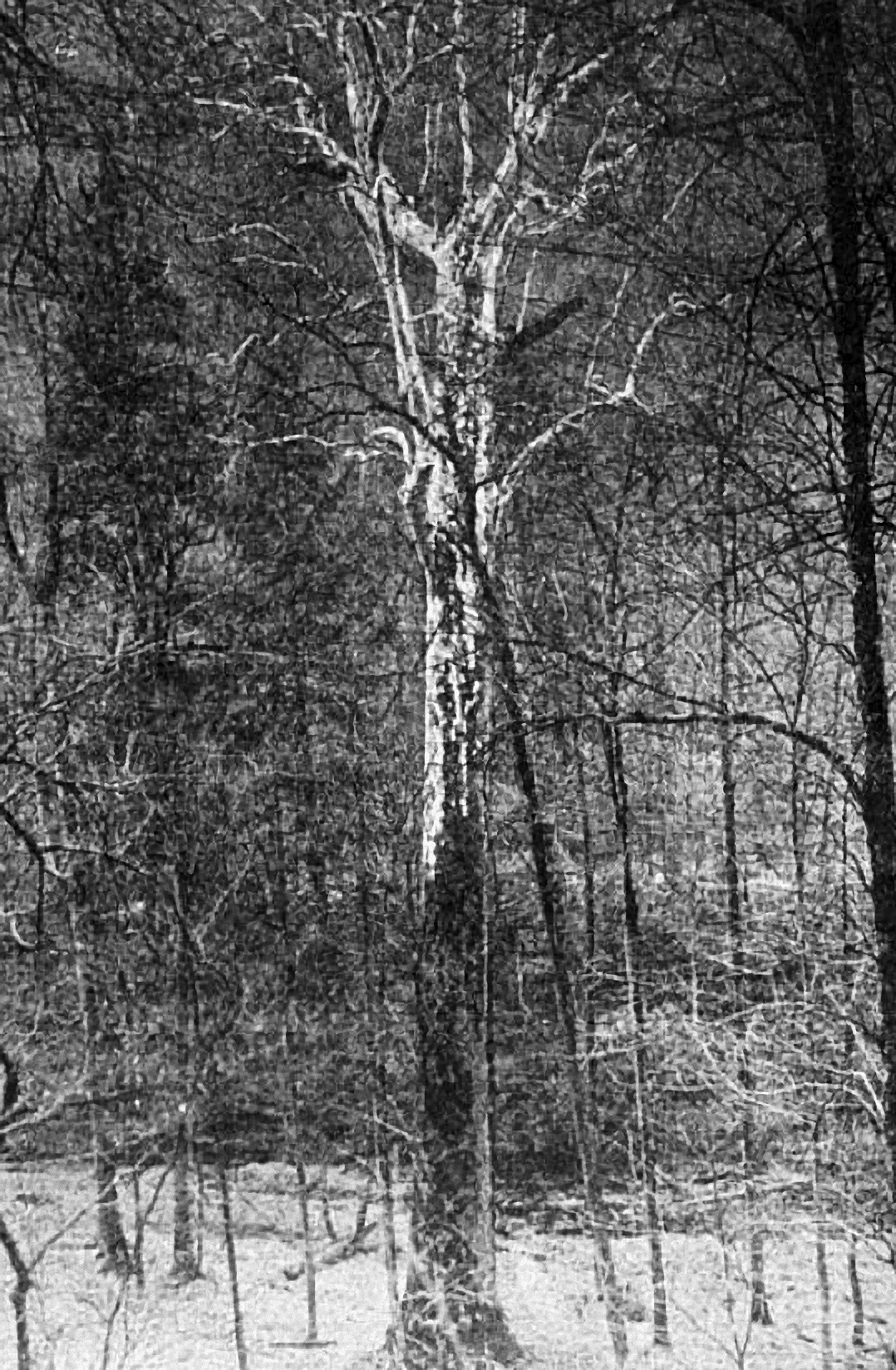
An image of an American sycamore near Webster Springs published in Trees, Stars and Birds: A Book of Outdoor Science (1920)

The Webster Sycamore had long been a local landmark on account of its age and size, and was known locally as being the world's largest American sycamore. By 1920, author Edwin Lincoln Moseley had included an image and a brief description of a similar American sycamore near Webster Springs – probably the Webster Sycamore – in his book Trees, Stars and Birds: A Book of Outdoor Science.

It was in 1955 that the tree won recognition from the American Forests Association as the largest tree of its species in the United States. It only held the title for three weeks before a larger American sycamore in Maryland was discovered and recognized by the association. Despite losing its national title, the sycamore remained the largest American sycamore in West Virginia.

During the West Virginia Centennial "big-tree contest" of 1963, the honorific of the state's largest tree went to a white oak (Quercus alba) near Huttonsville in Randolph County, thus beating out the Webster Sycamore. The white oak measured 11.25 feet (3.43 m) in diameter. An elm (Ulmus) tree in Putnam County also bested the Webster Sycamore at 8 feet (2.4 m) in diameter.

During a speech to the United States Senate in honor of West Virginia Day on June 18, 2004, U.S. Senator Robert C. Byrd mentioned the Webster Sycamore while boasting of "the biggest and best of West Virginia".

== Preservation ==
The land upon which the Webster Sycamore was located was owned by the Pardee and Curtin Lumber Company of nearby Webster Springs. The company spared the tree in the 1950s, during its lumber operations in the area. According to West Virginia University biologist W. H. Gillespie in Castanea, the tree stood as "a memorial of the original virgin forest". The Pardee and Curtin Lumber Company preserved the land surrounding the tree as a park, known as Big Sycamore Park. The park was utilized by campers, and by tourists visiting the tree. A swinging bridge across the Back Fork of Elk River provided access to the tree and the park.

In 2002, the Webster Sycamore was one of five trees nominated by the West Virginia Humanities Council to the National Register of Historic Trees, a registry of historic trees maintained by the American Forests Historic Tree Nursery.

During the annual events Webster Wildwater Weekend in April and the Webster County Nature Weekend in May, hiking excursions were led to the Webster Sycamore, in addition to the nearby Three Falls of Back Fork.

== Vandalism and death ==
On the afternoon of September 3, 2007, a malicious fire was set in the base of the Webster Sycamore's trunk. The fire burned up through the hollow center of the tree's hollow bole. The Webster Springs Fire Department, Webster County Sheriff's Department, and the West Virginia Division of Forestry provided a joint response to the fire, and remained on the scene for several hours until the flames were out. The tree survived the blaze but suffered irreparable damage.

Initially following the fire, the tree's vicinity was closed for the investigation and for an assessment of the extent of damage and safety risk. On September 27, 2007, the West Virginia Division of Forestry's urban forestry coordinator Bob Hannah and technical specialist Jennifer Brashears engaged in an inspection and evaluation of the tree to provide recommendations. In their report, Hannah and Brashears assessed that the tree's "severe structural weakness" was not caused by the fire, and instead highlighted the tree's "size, age, and severity of defects" as the cause of its instability. They did, however, assess that the fire may have caused further mortality of the tree's cambium. They used various measurements developed by the International Society of Arboriculture and the United States Forest Service to formulate a tree risk assessment. At the time of their investigation, the tree's diameter at breast height was 8.42 feet (2.57 m), with 27% of the trunk consisting of open space. Hannah and Brashears also found that one-third of the lower trunk and root crown demonstrated no callus formation and no new growth, but instead severe decay and peeling bark. Hannah and Brashears further determined that structural mitigation was not feasible, and that the Webster Sycamore was to be "considered an extreme hazard" and the public should be "excluded from its striking zone through fencing and signage".

The investigation into the fire was led by the Division of Forestry's chief investigator, Sam Butcher. The investigation lasted four months, and once a suspect had been identified, the case was turned over to the Webster County prosecuting attorney's office. Butcher credited Art Yagel, a Division of Forestry investigator, for bringing the investigation to its conclusion. In January 2008, a 17-year-old suspect from Bergoo was formally charged with a felony count of arson for setting fire to the tree, while a second juvenile was also charged with a misdemeanor for providing false information to investigators. The suspect was also charged with misdemeanor counts of providing false information to conservation officers, possession of marijuana, and underage consumption of alcohol. The second juvenile was not involved in the setting of the fire.

Following the fire, experts recommended that the Webster Sycamore be felled or fenced off as a security measure. According to the Division of Forestry, the tree was finally brought down during the summer of 2010.

In recognition of the tree, the Health Policy Division of the Office of the West Virginia Insurance Commissioner considered the name "Sycamore Healthcare Exchange" as one of the naming options for West Virginia's health insurance marketplace in 2011, following the passage of the Patient Protection and Affordable Care Act.

== See also ==
- Largest organisms
- List of individual trees

== Bibliography ==
- Abramson, Rudy; Haskell, Jean, eds. (2006). Encyclopedia of Appalachia. Knoxville, Tennessee: University of Tennessee Press. ISBN 978-1-57233-456-4. OCLC 60669068.
- Core, Earl Lemley (June 1950). "Notes on the Plant Geography of West Virginia". Castanea. 15 (2). Morgantown, West Virginia: Southern Appalachian Botanical Society: 61–79. ISSN 1938-4386. JSTOR 4031586. OCLC 57659851.
- Gillespie, W. H. (June 1955). "Notes and News". Castanea. 20 (2). Morgantown, West Virginia: Southern Appalachian Botanical Society: 71–73. ISSN 1938-4386. JSTOR 4031827. OCLC 57659851.
- Hannah, Bob; Brashears, Jennifer (September 27, 2007). ""Big Sycamore" Inspection Report" (PDF). Charleston, West Virginia: West Virginia Division of Forestry. Archived from the original (PDF) on October 5, 2015.
- Hicks, Ray R. (1998). Ecology and Management of Central Hardwood Forests. New York City: John Wiley & Sons. ISBN 978-0-471-13758-0. OCLC 38580106. Archived from the original on June 10, 2016 – via Google Books.
- Lewis, Ronald L. (1998). Transforming the Appalachian Countryside: Railroads, Deforestation, and Social Change in West Virginia, 1880–1920. Chapel Hill, North Carolina: University of North Carolina Press. ISBN 978-0-8078-6297-1. OCLC 45727827. Archived from the original on April 25, 2016 – via Google Books.
- Moseley, Edwin Lincoln (1920). Trees, Stars and Birds: A Book of Outdoor Science. Yonkers, New York: World Book Company. OCLC 1081568. Archived from the original on April 25, 2016 – via Google Books.
- United States Congress (2004). "United States of America Congressional Record, Proceedings and Debates of the 108th Congress Second Session, Volume 150–Part 10". Congressional Record: Proceedings and Debates of the ... Congress. Washington, D.C.: United States Government Printing Office. ISSN 0883-1947. OCLC 3881463. Archived from the original on May 2, 2016 – via Google Books.
