= Elizabeth Ann Bartholomew =

American botanist

- Betty Bartholomew
- Born: June 14, 1912; Wheeling, West Virginia
- Died: March 15, 1985 (aged 72); Morgantown, West Virginia
- Education: West Virginia University
- Scientific career
- Fields: Botany
- Workplaces: West Virginia University; West Virginia Academy of Science
- Author abbrev. (botany): E.A.Barthol.

Elizabeth Ann "Betty" Bartholomew (June 14, 1912 – March 15, 1985) was an American botanist dedicated to the study of plant systematics.

== Early life ==
Bartholomew was born on June 14, 1912, in Wheeling, West Virginia. Influenced by her naturalist father, she became interested in the natural sciences at a young age. When she was 12 Bartholomew joined the Girl Scouts, and she subsequently earned all of the nature badges. After high school, Bartholomew attended West Virginia University. She became interested in botany during her freshman year after taking a class taught by Perry Daniel Strausbaugh.

== Career ==
In 1936, Bartholomew graduated with an A.B. degree in botany from West Virginia University. She started working for the Botany Department, acting as Herbarium Assistant of the West Virginia University Herbarium. Bartholomew initiated an exchange program between dozens of botanists in the southeast, and she personally coordinated, sorted, and mailed the botanical specimens.

In 1946, Bartholomew became Secretary of the Southern Appalachian Botanical Club. She received her M.S. degree in botany from West Virginia University in 1948. under the direction of Earl Lemley Core. Her thesis was titled "The Flora of Wirt County, West Virginia".

In 1972, Bartholomew become secretary of the West Virginia Academy of Science, and in 1974, she was appointed assistant professor of biology at West Virginia University. She retired from WVU in 1977, the Southern Appalachian Botanical Club in 1981, and from the West Virginia Academy of Science in 1984.

== Legacy ==
The Elizabeth Ann Bartholomew Award, established in 1989, is presented by the Southern Appalachian Botanical Club annually. It is given to "individuals who have distinguished themselves in professional and public service that advances our knowledge and appreciation of the world of plants and their scientific, cultural, and aesthetic values, and/or exceptional service to the society."

The Elizabeth A. Bartholomew Seed Collection, housed in the WVU Herbarium, contains over 2,000 specimens.

== Awards ==
In 1974, Arch A. Moore Jr., Governor of West Virginia, gave Bartholomew an award as Outstanding West Virginian in 1974. The West Virginia Academy of Science gave her an appreciation award in 1983.

== Publications ==
- 1939. Spring foray in the Alleghanies of West Virginia. Castanea 4:131-132.
- 1940. Three spermatophytes new to West Virginia. Castanea 5:111.
- 1941. Galium pedemontanum in North America. Castanea 6:141-142.
- 1948. The flora of Wirt County. Castanea 13:145-167.
- 1948. Flora of Wirt County, West Virginia. Unpublished Masters Thesis, West Virginia University. 166 p.
- 1950. The family Hypericaceae in West Virginia. Castanea 15:102-110.
- 1951. The genus Botrychium in West Virginia. Castanea 16:135-137.
- 1957. Euonymus alatus established West Virginia. Castanea 22:139.
- 1957. Spring wild flowers-No. 1. West Virginia Univ. and The U.S. Dept. of Agriculture.
- 1960. Summer and fall wild flowers. West Virginia Univ. and The U.S. Dept. of Agriculture.

The standard author abbreviation E.A.Barthol. is used to indicate this person as the author when citing a botanical name.
