= Tennessee Encyclopedia =

Print and digital reference work about the U.S. state of Tennessee

- Editor: Carroll Van West
- Genre: Reference book
- Publication date: 1998
- ISBN: 978-1558535992

Tennessee Encyclopedia, officially known as Tennessee Encyclopedia of History and Culture, is a reference book on the U.S. state of Tennessee that was published in book form in 1998 and has also been available online since 2002. Contents include history, geography, culture, and biographies of notable people from Tennessee.

== History ==
The original print edition was developed as a Tennessee Historical Society educational project for the Tennessee state bicentennial in 1996. The idea of the encyclopedia was proposed in 1993 and work began the following year. The Tennessee General Assembly provided project funding in fiscal years 1995 through 1998. Additional funding came from several foundations; Middle Tennessee State University provided some in-kind support.

When the book was completed in 1998, it became the third state encyclopedia to be published in the United States. The print edition (ISBN 1558535993 and ISBN 978-1-55853-599-2) has 1,193 pages containing 1,534 entries contributed by 514 authors. It was a co-winner of a Tennessee History Book Award and was recognized with a 1999 American Association for State and Local History (AASLH) Award of Merit.

An online edition of the encyclopedia has been on the Internet since 2002. It includes the contents of the book plus some new entries and some multimedia content. The online edition is jointly produced and maintained by the Tennessee Historical Society and the University of Tennessee Press. Access to the full contents is free. The online interface was revised and updated in February 2011.

Editor for both the print and online versions is Carroll Van West, a Middle Tennessee State University history professor who is director of that university's Center for Historic Preservation. Copyright to the contents of both the print and online versions is held by the Tennessee Historical Society.
