= Walter T. Durham =

American historian (1924–2013)

- Born: October 7, 1924; Gallatin, Tennessee, U.S.
- Died: May 24, 2013 (aged 88)
- Education: University of Wisconsin; Vanderbilt University
- Occupation: Local historian
- Spouse: Anna Armstrong Coile
- Children: 4
- Parent(s): George Franklin Durham; Celeste McAlister

Walter T. Durham (October 7, 1924 – May 24, 2013) was an American historian. He was the Tennessee State Historian from 2002 to 2013, and the author of 24 books of local history.

== Early life ==
Durham was born on October 7, 1924, in Gallatin, Tennessee, to George Franklin Durham and Celeste McAlister. His paternal grandfather, J. T. Durham, served as a member of the Tennessee Senate. He served in the United States Army during World War II between 1943 and 1946. He subsequently attended the University of Wisconsin, and he graduated from Vanderbilt University, where he earned bachelor of arts and master's degrees.

== Career ==
Durham worked as a businessman in Gallatin. He was the founding president of the Tennessee Heritage Alliance, later known as the Tennessee Preservation Trust. He also served as the president of the Tennessee Historical Society, and as the chairman of the Tennessee Historical Commission. In 2002, he was appointed as the Tennessee State Historian by Governor Don Sundquist.

Durham was the author of 24 books of local history. He wrote about the Antebellum era like Congressman Balie Peyton or the Rose Mont plantation; the American Civil War of 1861–1865 in Tennessee; and the post-bellum era like the forty-niners from Tennessee who took part in the California Gold Rush.

== Personal life, death and legacy ==
Durham married Anna Armstrong Coile, and they had four children. They resided in Gallatin.

Durham died on May 24, 2013, at 88. His funeral was held at the First Methodist Church of Gallatin. He was succeeded as the Tennessee State Historian by Carroll Van West. Durham is the namesake of the Tennessee Historical Society's Walter Durham Award, given annually to scholars. The Walter T. Durham Bridge was named in his honor in 2015.

== Selected works ==
- Durham, Walter T. (1997). Volunteer Forty-Niners: Tennesseans and the California Gold Rush. Nashville, Tennessee: Vanderbilt University Press. ISBN 9780585170930. OCLC 44959444.
- Durham, Walter T. (2002). Josephus Conn Guild and Rose Mont: Politics and Plantation in Nineteenth Century Tennessee. Franklin, Tennessee: Hillsboro Press. ISBN 9781577362883. OCLC 52238267.
- Durham, Walter T. (2004). Balie Peyton of Tennessee: Nineteenth Century Politics and Thoroughbreds. Franklin, Tennessee: Hillsboro Press. ISBN 9781577363231. OCLC 835774037.
- Durham, Walter T. (2008). Nashville: The Occupied City, 1862-1863. Knoxville, Tennessee: University of Tennessee Press. ISBN 9781572336339. OCLC 751448051.
- Durham, Walter T. (2008). Reluctant Partners: Nashville and the Union, 1863-1865. Knoxville, Tennessee: University of Tennessee Press. OCLC 760156820.
