= Strausbaugh =

Strausbaugh is a surname. Notable people with the surname include:

- Jimmy Strausbaugh (1918–1991), American football player
- John Strausbaugh (born 1951), American author
- Perry Daniel Strausbaugh (1886–1965), American botanist
- Scott Strausbaugh (born 1963), American slalom canoer
