= Nicholas Honerkamp =

American archaeologist

- Education: University of Florida
- Known for: Archaeologist

Nicholas Honerkamp is an American archaeologist whose principal fields of interest are historical archaeology, plantation archaeology, industrial archaeology and archaeological method and theory. Honerkamp is a professor of anthropology in the Department of Sociology, Anthropology and Geography at the University of Tennessee at Chattanooga. He is also the director of the Jeffrey L. Brown Institute of Archaeology at the University of Tennessee at Chattanooga.

== Selected publications ==
- Council, R. Bruce, Nicholas Honerkamp and M. Elizabeth Will.1992. Industry and Technology in Antebellum Tennessee: The Archaeology of Bluff Furnace. Knoxville: University of Tennessee Press.
- Honerkamp, Nicholas.1977. Colonial Life on the Georgia Coast: The Thomas Hird Family. St. Simons Island, Georgia: Fort Frederica Association.
- Honerkamp, Nicholas (editor).1988. Questions That Count In Historical Archaeology. Historical Archaeology 22(1):5-42.
- Honerkamp, Nicholas.1996. Sixteenth- and Seventeenth-Century British Colonial Archaeology in the Southeastern United States. In The
- Archaeology of Sixteenth and Seventeenth-Century British Colonization in the Caribbean, United States, and Canada, edited by Henry M. Miller, D.L Hamilton, Nicholas Honerkamp, Steven R. Pendery, Peter E. Pope, and James A. Tuck. Guides to Historical Archaeological Literature of the Emigrant Experience in America, Number 4. Society for Historical Archaeology:13-23.
- Honerkamp, Nicholas.2009. The Trajectory of Plantation Studies in Historical Archaeology: An Introduction. In The Archaeology of Plantation Life: Perspectives from Historical Archaeology, compiled by Nicholas Honerkamp. Society for Historical Archaeology:1-15.
- Honerkamp, Nicholas and R. Bruce Council. 1984. Individual Versus Corporate Adaptations in Urban Contexts. Tennessee Anthropologist 9(1):22-31
- Honerkamp, Nicholas and Charles H. Fairbanks. 1984. Definition of Site Formation Processes in Urban Contexts. American Archaeology 4(1):60-66.
- Honerkamp, Nicholas and Norma J. Harris. 2005. Unfired Brandon Gunflints From the Presidio Santa Maria de Galve, Pensacola, Florida. Historical Archaeology 39(4):95-111.
- Honerkamp, Nicholas and Elizabeth J. Reitz. 1983. Eighteenth Century British Colonial Adaptations on the Coast of Georgia: The Faunal Evidence. In Forgotten Places and Things: Archaeological Perspectives on American History. Albert E. Ward, ed., pp. 335–339. Albuquerque: The Center for Anthropological Studies.
- Honerkamp, Nicholas and Martha A. Zierden (editors). 1984 Archaeological Approaches to Urban Society: Charleston, South Carolina. South Carolina Antiquities 16(1,2).
- Reitz, Elizabeth J. and Nicholas Honerkamp. 1983. British Colonial Subsistence Strategy on the Southeastern Coastal Plain. Historical Archaeology 17(2):4-26.
- Reitz, Elizabeth J. and Nicholas Honerkamp. 1984 "Historical" Versus "Archaeological" Dietary Patterns on the Southeastern Coastal Plain. In Archaeological Approaches to Urban Society: Charleston, South Carolina. Published as Volume 16(1,2) of South Carolina Antiquities. Nicholas Honerkamp and Martha A. Zierden, eds., pp. 67–85.
