= UT Press =

UT Press can stand for:

- the University of Tennessee Press
- the University of Texas Press
- University of Toronto Press
