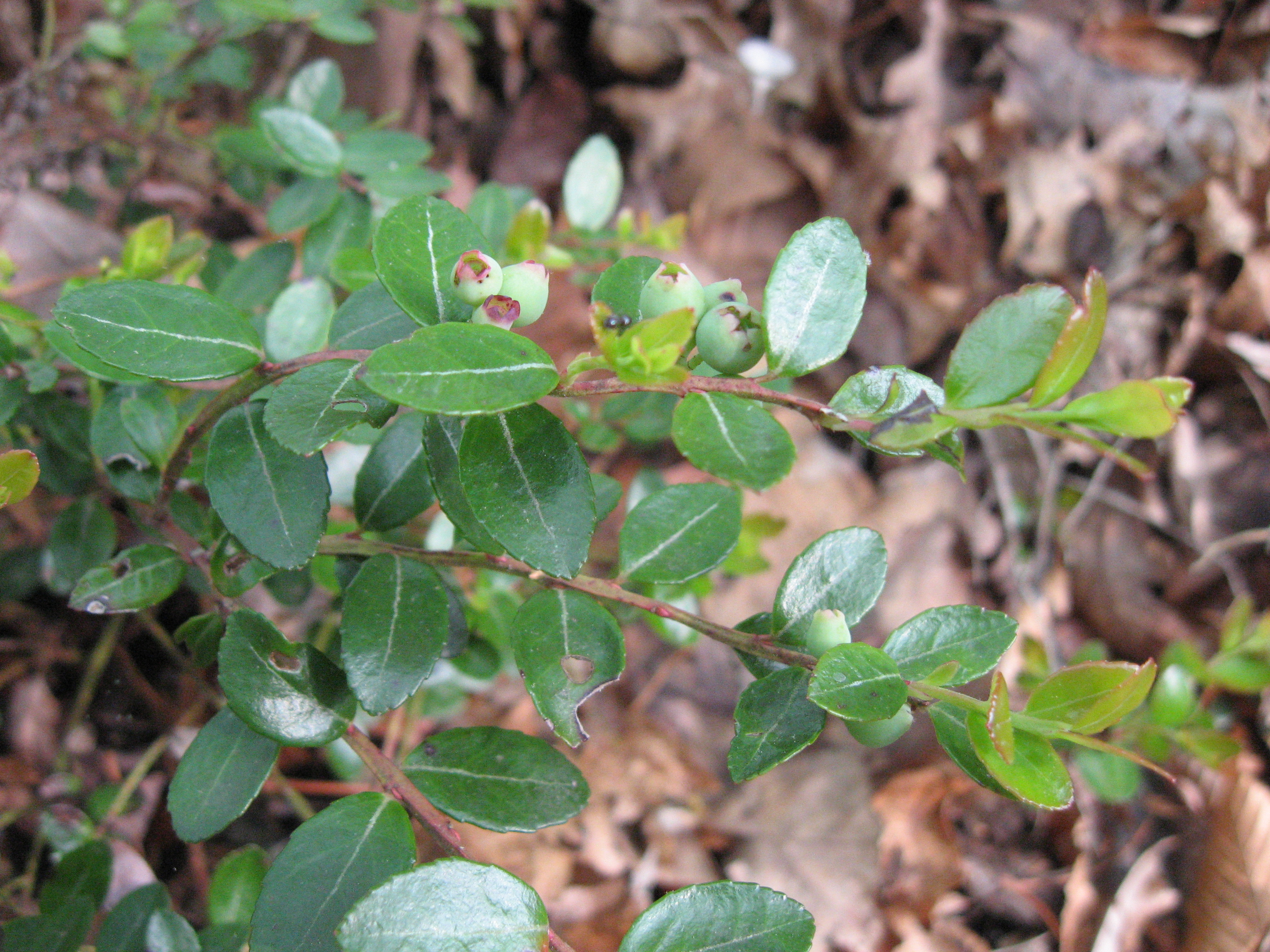
- Box huckleberry in fruit

Conservation status
- Vulnerable (NatureServe)

Scientific classification
- Kingdom: Plantae
- Clade: Tracheophytes
- Clade: Angiosperms
- Clade: Eudicots
- Clade: Asterids
- Order: Ericales
- Family: Ericaceae
- Genus: Gaylussacia
- Species: G. brachycera

Binomial name
- Gaylussacia brachycera (Michx.) A.Gray

Synonyms
- Vaccinium brachycerum Michx. 1803; Vaccinium buxifolium Salisb.; Buxella brachycera Small; Adnaria brachycera (Torr. & A.Gray) Kuntze; Decamerium brachycerum (Michx.) Ashe

= Gaylussacia brachycera =

Box huckleberry

Species of plant

Gaylussacia brachycera, commonly known as box huckleberry or box-leaved whortleberry, is a low North American shrub related to the blueberry and the other huckleberries. It is native to the east-central United States (Pennsylvania, Delaware, Maryland, Virginia, West Virginia, North Carolina, Kentucky, and Tennessee).

Gaylussacia brachycera is easily distinguished from other members of its genus by its leaves: they resemble those of boxwood (hence its name) and lack the resin glands typical of huckleberries. Like its relatives, it bears white urn-shaped flowers in the early summer, which develop to blue, edible berries in late summer. It is mostly found in Appalachia; many of its stands there were known to natives, who picked and ate the berries, before botanists became aware of them in the 1920s.

A relict species nearly exterminated by the last ice age, box huckleberry is self-sterile, and is found in isolated colonies which reproduce clonally by extending roots. One colony in Pennsylvania was once estimated to be as many as 13,000 years old; more recent estimates have an upper bound of about 8,000 years, which would make it the oldest woody plant east of the Rocky Mountains. Another colony in Pennsylvania, about 1,300 years old, has been protected by the Hoverter and Sholl Box Huckleberry Natural Area.

== Description ==
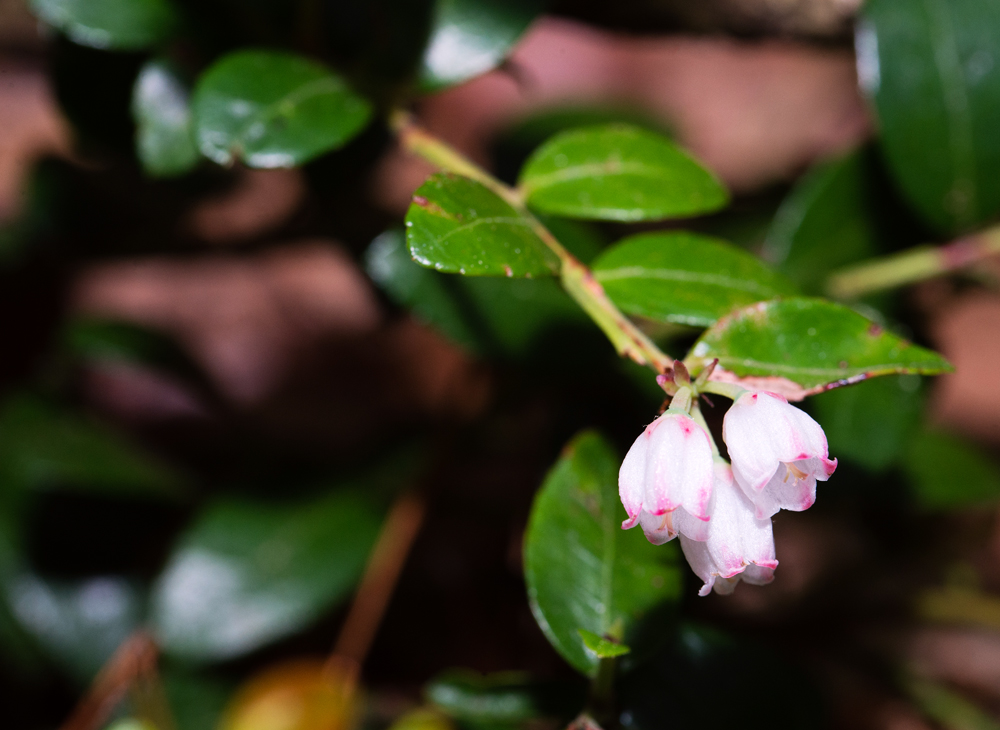
A close-up of box huckleberry's flowers.

Box huckleberry is a low shrub, growing 6 to 8 inches (150 to 200 mm) tall. Its leaves resemble those of boxwood (hence its name). The leaves are about 1 inch (2.5 cm) long and oval-shaped. They are glossy and minutely toothed, turning red in winter. The evergreen leaves, lacking resin glands, are in sharp contrast to other species of Gaylussacia. Box huckleberry flowers in May and June. The flowers are urn-shaped and white, sometimes tinged with pink. Like other huckleberries, the flowers appear on a raceme springing from the leaf axils. Its fruits, which appear in July and August, are blue berries borne on short pedicels.

== Taxonomy ==
Box huckleberry was first collected and described in 1796 near Winchester, Virginia (probably in what is now West Virginia) by the botanist André Michaux. Michaux named it Vaccinium brachycerum in his Flora Boreali-Americana, published in 1803. Matthias Kinn, in about 1800, and Frederick Pursh, in 1805, also obtained specimens in West Virginia. R. A. Salisbury referred to it as V. buxifolium in 1805, and this remained the prevailing name for the next forty years; the common name "box-leaved whortle-berry" was used for the species at the time.

No further specimens were collected until 1845, when Spencer Fullerton Baird, a professor at Dickinson College, discovered a colony near New Bloomfield, Pennsylvania. It was redesignated G. brachycera in 1846 by Asa Gray on the basis of Baird's specimens. (Gaylussacia was not recognized as a genus separate from Vaccinium until 1819.) The discovery brought about a friendship between Gray and Baird that ultimately resulted in the latter's appointment as secretary of the Smithsonian Institution.

John Kunkel Small assigned the species, as Buxella brachycera, to a monospecific genus in 1933. However, this was not widely accepted, and was rejected by other authors on the grounds of both nomenclatural and "phyletic unsoundness". More recently, phylogenetic studies in 2002 suggested that the monophyly of G. brachycera with the remainder of Gaylussacia is "equivocal", and further analysis of Vaccinium might result in G. brachycera being returned to that genus.

== Distribution and habitat ==
About 100 separate stations for box huckleberry have been documented in the scientific literature. By the time of Baird's collection in 1845, the West Virginia stands of the plant had been lost to science, and his Pennsylvania colony was the only one known for some time. Specimens of box huckleberry were subsequently identified in Delaware in 1870, by William M. Canby.

In 1919, Frederick V. Coville called attention to the threatened state of the plant in an article in Science. While investigating the species for horticultural purposes, he only found two herbarium specimens, those of Baird and Canby. (Coville apparently did not locate Kinn's West Virginia specimen, preserved at the Muhlenberg Herbarium.) Upon examination of the New Bloomfield site in 1918, he discovered the entire colony, except for one patch cut off by cultivation, was connected by roots, and that no seedlings were in evidence anywhere around the margins of the colony. Coville concluded that the plant was self-sterile and reproduced by extending rootstocks. After commercial nurserymen removed a truckload of box huckleberry from the New Bloomfield site in 1918, Coville was particularly anxious to preserve the species, as the New Bloomfield site was the only one then thought extant. (It was protected by the state from 1929, becoming the Hoverter and Sholl Box Huckleberry Natural Area.) However, Edgar T. Wherry was able to locate the Delaware colony, thought lost, in 1919, and send specimens for cross-pollination with specimens from the Pennsylvania colony.

This report stimulated considerable interest in the species. Additional colonies were located in Pennsylvania and Delaware, one in Maryland, several in Virginia, three in Tennessee (1920–1930), two in Kentucky (1927–1932), and many in West Virginia (1921). In summarizing these discoveries in 1932, Wherry noted that many of the colonies were already known to local residents, who picked the berries for food, under names such as "juniper-berry", "ground-huckleberry", and "bear-huckleberry". He called for more intensive effort on the part of the scientific community to make use of such local knowledge in determining plant geography. More recently, a colony of box huckleberry was discovered in Durham County, North Carolina, the first report from that state, in 2003. Per the most recent NC Natural Heritage Program List of Rare Plant Species, G. brachycera has since been listed as Endangered and given protected status within the state.

Most of the reported stations for box huckleberry fall within the Appalachian Mountains, ranging from central Pennsylvania in the north to eastern Tennessee in the south. However, the specimens located in Maryland and Delaware were found on the Atlantic Coastal Plain, and the single North Carolina station is in the Piedmont. Its scattered distribution suggests that the species once spread more broadly across North America, but was almost eradicated by glacial advances, surviving only where it escaped the ice in protected refugia.

Box huckleberry prefers dry, acidic soils, including duff, and partial shade. Locations on wooded slopes tend to face north; however, the New Bloomfield site faces west. At one of the Delaware sites, a small portion of the colony extended to the wet margin of a marsh, but most was located on dry, sandy soil upslope.

== Ecology and human use ==
Box huckleberry is self-sterile, so single plants cannot reproduce sexually. Instead, they form colonies which spread by vegetative reproduction along rootstocks. A colony of G. brachycera at Losh Run, in Perry County, Pennsylvania was found to be 6,500 feet (2,000 m) in extent when surveyed. If this colony grew clonally from a seed deposited along the Juniata River at the rate of 15 centimetres (5.9 in) per year, it would be about 13,000 years old, the oldest living organism in the United States and second oldest in the world, eclipsed only by Lomatia tasmanica. However, this is believed now to be an overestimate on climatic grounds. At that time, the site was covered by a boreal forest, believed to be too cold for the box huckleberry to survive; the current forest did not begin to appear at the site until about 8,000 years ago. This age would still make it the oldest woody plant in North America east of the Rocky Mountains. Recent studies have attempted to determine whether, in fact, the reproduction of the colony (since heavily damaged by a forest fire in 1963 and road construction in the 1970s) has been entirely clonal. Two genotypes were found in samples taken from the colony, but they are thought to have arisen through somatic mutation rather than sexual reproduction. Unfortunately, the destruction of about 80% of the colony by fire and construction makes it impossible to definitively settle the question.

With the cooperation of the United States Department of Agriculture, efforts are under way to promote G. brachycera as a groundcover for use in landscaping. Box huckleberry is commercially available from at least one source but it is difficult to propagate, making it unprofitable for many nurseries to carry. It is commonly marketed as 'Berried Treasure™' (the trademark symbol is not always present), and while the name gives the impression of being a cultivar, it is simply a clone of the wild colony. Briggs Nursery has developed a treasure chest logo and stylized title to accompany its marketing material for the plant. In New Bloomfield, PA, the box huckleberry has become part of the local New Year's celebrations, as a papier-mâché replica of a huckleberry is dropped, instead of a ball, to mark the new year.

The caterpillar of the moth Dichomeris juncidella has been reported to feed on the leaves. The berries are eaten by wild turkeys and ruffed grouse. They have been harvested for food by humans in West Virginia, Kentucky, and Tennessee. Rev. Frederick W. Gray, who documented many of the box huckleberry colonies in West Virginia in the 1920s, first took an interest in the plant when served a "juniper" pie, "juniper" being the local name for box huckleberry. However, they are reportedly tasteless.

== Bibliography ==
- Brooks, Maurice G.; Boone, Weldon; Gilbert, Frank; Davis, H. A.; Sharp, Aaron J. (December 1986). "Southern Appalachian botany: some historical reflections". Castanea. 51 (4): 233–238. JSTOR 4033305.
- Camp, Wendell H. (November 1941). "Studies in the Ericales: a review of the North American Gaylussacieae; with remarks on the origin and migration of the group". Bulletin of the Torrey Botanical Club. 68 (8): 531–551. doi:10.2307/2481455. JSTOR 2481455.
- Claypole, Edward W. (March 1883). "Note on a relic of the native flora of Pennsylvania, surviving in Perry County". Proceedings of the American Philosophical Society. 21 (114): 226–230. JSTOR 982379.
- Cook, Will (2013). "Box Huckleberry (Gaylussacia brachycera)".
- Coville, Frederick V. (July 11, 1919). "The threatened extinction of the box huckleberry, Gaylussacia brachycera". Science. 50 (1280): 30–34. Bibcode:1919Sci....50...30C. doi:10.1126/science.50.1280.30. JSTOR 1641999. PMID 17801660.
- Crable, Ad (August 20, 1999). "Meet the world's oldest – and hardest working – plant". Lancaster New Era. Lancaster Newspapers, Inc.
- Cullina, William (2002). Native Trees, Shrubs & Vines. Houghton Mifflin Books. p. 136. ISBN 0-618-09858-5.
- "Have a 'berry' good New Year". Daily Union. Montgomery Communications, Inc. December 30, 1994.
- Fergus, Charles; Rae, Rusty (January 2002). Natural Pennsylvania: Exploring the State Forest Natural Areas. Stackpole Books. p. 48. ISBN 978-0-8117-2038-0.
- Floyd, Jennifer Whitehead (2002). "Phylogenetic and biogeographic patterns in Gaylussacia (Ericaceae) based on morphological, nuclear DNA, and chloroplast DNA variation". Systematic Botany. 27 (1): 99–115. doi:10.1043/0363-6445-27.1.99 (inactive 12 July 2025). JSTOR 3093898.
- Kadis, Irina (March 4, 2010). "CPC plant profile for Gaylussacia brachycera". Center for Plant Conservation. Archived from the original on 2008-06-05.
- Kirkman, W. Benson; Ballington, James R. (1990). "Creeping blueberries (Ericaceae: Vaccinium sect. Herpothamnus)-a new look at V. crassifolium including V. sempervirens". Systematic Botany. 15 (4): 679–699. Bibcode:1990SysBo..15..679K. doi:10.2307/2419164. JSTOR 2419164.
- NatureServe (November 1, 2024). "Gaylussacia brachycera". NatureServe Explorer. Arlington, Virginia.
- Nicholson, Rob (2011). "Little Big Plant, Box Huckleberry (Gaylussacia brachycera)" (PDF). Arnoldia. 68 (3): 11–18. doi:10.5962/p.251567.
- Pooler, Margaret; Dix, Ruth; Griesbach, Robert (August 2003). "Recovery, propagation, and evaluation of the box huckleberry, Gaylussacia brachycera (Michx.) Gray". HortScience. 38 (5): 668.
- Pooler, Margaret; Nicholson, Rob; Vandegrift, Andrew (2008). "Clonal fidelity in large colonies of Gaylussacia brachycera Gray (box huckleberry) assessed by DNA fingerprinting". Northeastern Naturalist. 15 (1): 67–74. doi:10.1656/1092-6194(2008)15[67:CFILCO]2.0.CO;2. hdl:10113/17706. S2CID 8337634.
- Sims, John (1806). "Vaccinium buxifolium. Box-Leaved Whortle-Berry". Curtis's Botanical Magazine. 24. London: Stephen Couchman: 928.
- Smith, Hazel; Smith, Don (June 1971). "The box huckleberry, Gaylussacia brachycera". Castanea. 36 (2): 81–89. JSTOR 4032308.
- "Gaylussacia brachycera (box huckleberry): NPIN". The Lady Bird Johnson Wildflower Center (TWC). 2007.
- Wherry, Edgar T. (February 1934). "The box huckleberry as an illustration of the need for fieldwork". Bulletin of the Torrey Botanical Club. 61 (2): 81–84. doi:10.2307/2480787. JSTOR 2480787.
- Wherry, Edgar T. (June 1972). "Box-huckleberry as the oldest living protoplasm". Castanea. 37 (2): 94–95. JSTOR 4032456.
