= Perry Daniel Strausbaugh =

American botanist

- P. D. Strausbaugh, 1961
- Born: March 21, 1886; Seneca County, Ohio
- Died: May 3, 1965 (aged 79); Orlando, Florida
- Education: College of Wooster; University of Chicago
- Scientific career
- Fields: Botany
- Workplaces: College of Wooster; West Virginia University
- Author abbrev. (botany): Strausb.

Perry Daniel Strausbaugh (March 21, 1886 - May 3, 1965) was an American botanist and expert in the flora of West Virginia. The standard author abbreviation Strausb. is used to indicate this person as the author when citing a botanical name.

== Early life ==
Strausbaugh was born near Republic, Ohio on March 21, 1886. When he was 16, he received his teacher's certificate and began teaching grade school in Danville, Ohio. He first became interested in botany in 1904 while taking college preparatory classes at North Manchester College. In 1906, he received a Bachelor of English from Canton College and Bible Institute. He went on to get a S.B. degree from the College of Wooster in 1913, where he was also working as an instructor. He continued to teach at the school as an instructor in biology from 1913 to 1915, and as assistant professor from 1915 to 1918. In 1916, Strausbaugh enrolled at the University of Chicago as a graduate student in botany under the direction of John Merle Coulter. He earned his Ph.D. in 1920, graduating cum laude.

== Career ==
After his graduation, Strausbaugh returned to Wooster College as assistant professor of botany, becoming a full professor of botany from 1921 to 1923. In 1923, Strausbaugh accepted the position as head of the department of botany at West Virginia University and moved to Morgantown, West Virginia. Here, one of his first acts was to re-organize the University Herbarium first established by Charles Frederick Millspaugh and to start to bolster the collection.

In 1937, Strausbaugh was listed as an original member of the Southern Appalachian Botanical Club.

During World War II, Strausbaugh served as lieutenant colonel. He was in charge of growing grass next to landing strips in order to prevent dust clouds from damaging aircraft and other machinery.

In 1948, Strausbaugh retired from West Virginia University, but remained as a professor emeritus. His summer courses lead to the establishment of the Terra Alta Biological Station in 1962.

== Legacy ==
After his retirement, West Virginia University started off the P. D. Strausbaugh Student Loan Fund. The longest nature trail in the Core Arboretum was named the Strausbaugh Trail in 1955.

== Selected publications ==
- Dormancy and hardiness in the plum. Bot. Gaz. 71: 337–357. 1921.
- Common seed plants of the mid-Appalachian region. 507 p. Edwards Bros., Ann Harbor, Mich. Without date (about 1927).
- Some troublesome weeds found in water supplies. W. Va. Eng. Exp. Sta. Tech. Bull. 2: 102–108. 1928.
- Plant life of West Virginia. In W. Va. Encyclopedia. W. Va. Publ. Co., Charleston. pp. 678–689. 1929.
- An invading potato sprout. Plant Physiology 4: 157, 158. 1929.
- Some additions to the Millspaugh check-list of West Virginia spermatophytes. Proc. W. Va. Acad. Sci. 4: 38–48. 1930. (with Earl L. Core).
- At the head of the Cacapon. Scientific Monthly 33: 80–85. 1931. (with J. G. Needham).
- Common seed plants of the mid-Appalachian region. 305 p. Morgantown, W. Va. 1931. 2nd ed. 1955. (with Earl L. Core and Nelle P. Ammons).
- The West Virginia University Biological Expedition. W. Va. School Journ. 60: 6, 7. December 1931.
- Phymosia remota. Rhodora 34: 142–146. 1932. (with Earl L. Core).
- Cranberry Glades. American Forests 40: 362–364, 382, 383. 1934.
- Trees and shrubs of West Virginia. Mimeo. 109 p. 1935. (with Earl L. Core).
- Additions to the Millspaugh check-list of West Virginia spermatophytes. Proc. W. Va. Acad. Sci. 9: 29–31. 1935. (with Earl L. Core).
- Quaerite et invenietis. Sigma Xi Quarterly 24: 195–204. 1936.
- William Earl Rumsey. Castanea 3: 53, 54. 1938.
- Elements of biology. 461 p. New York, London. 1944. (with B. R. Weimer).
- Some stages in the development of sphagnum bogs in West Virginia. Castanea 14: 129–148. 1949. (with G. B. Rigg).
- Some new or otherwise noteworthy plants from West Virginia. Castanea 17: 16&i. 1952. (with Earl L. Core).
- Theodore Roosevelt (book review) Castanea 22: 124, 125. 1957.
- Rev. Fred W. Gray. Castanea 25: 132. 1960.
