= Frederick William Gray =

American botanist (1878–1960)

Rev. Frederick William Gray
- Born: 1878; Anson County, North Carolina
- Died: 9 March 1960 (age 82); Washington, D.C.
- Education: Catawba College; Union Theological Seminary
- Scientific career
- Fields: Botany
- Author abbrev. (botany): F.W.Gray

Frederick William Gray was an American pastor, horticulturalist, and botanist. He was known for his work in the cultivation of Gladiolus and for his expertise in the flora of West Virginia.

== Biography ==
Gray was born in Anson County, North Carolina, in 1878. He attained his Bachelor of Arts degree from Catawba College in 1905, before attending Union Theological Seminary to earn his Bachelor of Divinity degree in 1908. After his graduation, Gray became a minister of the Presbyterian Church.

Gray worked as a pastor around West Virginia, Virginia, and Missouri. He was bestowed an honorary Doctor of Divinity degree by Davis and Elkins College in 1929. In 1932, he settled in Barbour County, West Virginia.

Gray was a founding member of the Southern Appalachian Botanical Club in 1935. He gained a reputation in the field of horticulture through the hybridization and cultivation Gladiolus flowers. He was also a keen plant collector, contributing thousands of specimens to regional herbaria. Gray himself studied plants, and published descriptive scientific articles on varieties and forms he discovered.

Gray retired to Riverside, Maryland. He died in Washington, D.C. on 9 March 1960 at the age of 82. He had a daughter and two sons.

== Legacy ==
Approximately 24,000 specimens collected by Gray are housed at the University of West Virginia. The herbarium at the University of North Carolina at Chapel Hill also maintains a small collection of Gray's specimens.
