= Bergoo, West Virginia =

Bergoo
- Census-designated place (CDP)
- Location within the state of West Virginia
- Coordinates: 38°29′11″N 80°18′2″W
- Country: United States
- State: West Virginia
- County: Webster

Area
  - Total: 0.224 sq mi (0.58 km^{2})
  - Land: 0.212 sq mi (0.55 km^{2})
  - Water: 0.012 sq mi (0.031 km^{2})

Population (2020)
  - Total: 64
  - Density: 300/sq mi (120/km^{2})
- Time zone: UTC-5 (Eastern (EST))
  - Summer (DST): UTC-4 (EDT)

Bergoo is a census-designated place (CDP) in Webster County, West Virginia, United States. As of the 2020 census, its population was 64 (down from 94 at the 2010 census). Bergoo lies at the confluence of the Elk River and Leatherwood Creek. Bergoo was formerly known as Leatherwood, taking its name from the creek.

Some say Bergoo was the name of a local Indian, while others believe the community was named after Burgoo, a type of stew.

== Climate ==
The climate in this area has mild differences between highs and lows, and there is adequate rainfall year-round. According to the Köppen Climate Classification system, Bergoo has a marine west coast climate, abbreviated "Cfb" on climate maps.
