= Earl Lemley Core =

American botanist and educator

- Professor Core, WVU
- Born: January 20, 1902; Core, West Virginia
- Died: December 8, 1984 (aged 82)
- Education: West Virginia University; Columbia University
- Scientific career
- Fields: Botany
- Workplaces: West Virginia University
- Author abbrev. (botany): Core

Earl Lemley Core (January 20, 1902 – December 8, 1984) was an American botanist and botanical educator, researcher, author and historian of West Virginia. He was founder of the Southern Appalachian Botanical Club and editor of its journal, Castanea, for thirty-five years. He was a teacher and professor at West Virginia University (WVU) from 1928 to 1972. He served for four years on the Morgantown City Council, and served as mayor of Morgantown for two years. The Earl L. Core Arboretum at WVU was named in his honor in 1967.

== Biography ==
=== Youth and education ===
Core was born on January 20, 1902, at Core, West Virginia, the son of Harry Michael and Clara Edna (née Lemley) Core. He graduated from Morgantown High School and taught in rural schools from 1920 to 1923. He then attended WVU, earning a Bachelor of Arts in 1926 and a Master of Arts in 1928. He earned his Doctor of Philosophy degree in 1936 from Columbia University. His dissertation was on the systematics of the sedge genus Scleria.

=== Career ===
Core became an instructor at WVU in 1928 and remained on the faculty for over 44 years. He progressed to assistant professor in 1934, associate professor in 1941, professor in 1942, and professor emeritus in 1972. Core was chairman of the Biology Department from 1948 to 1966. He served as curator of the university herbarium from 1934 until his retirement in 1972. In addition, he served as a member of the summer faculty at Ohio State University between 1939 and 1941, and of Concord College in 1961.

Core was named botanist for the Colombia Cinchona Mission, Bogota, Colombia, from 1943 to 1945 during which assignment he explored in the Andes Mountains in search of wartime sources of quinine from the Cinchona tree.

== Writing ==
In the course of his career, Core authored numerous technical articles, several books, and hundreds of newspaper articles. Two notable textbooks that became standards were General Biology, co-authored by Core, P.D. Strausbaugh, and B.R. Weimer, and A New Manual for the Biology Laboratory, co-authored with Weimer. His botanical texts were The Flora of West Virginia, a four volume series written with Strausbaugh, Flora of the Erie Islands, Spring Wild Flowers, Plant Taxonomy, and Vegetation of West Virginia. He also prepared a collection of weekly botanical writings for the Charleston (West Virginia) Gazette entitled The Wondrous Year.

In 1937, Core wrote The Chronicles of Core, a history of his home community. In 1960 he published Morgantown Disciples, a history of the First Christian Church of Morgantown, West Virginia. Late in life he embarked upon an extensive five-volume history of Monongalia County, West Virginia (1974–84), completing the last volume shortly before his death. This material had been published over a period of 12 years in a weekly column of the Morgantown Dominion Post newspaper.

Earl Lemley Core was a colleague of the American chemist George L. Humphrey, and in 1977, Core published an article about an experiment Humphrey conducted to determine the source and chemical composition of a mysterious crystalline substance he observed accumulating on his car, which was later identified as honeydew excreted by aphids.

== Honors and accolades ==
- Member and past president, Phi Beta Kappa
- Distinguished Professor at WVU (1967)
- The Earl L. Core Arboretum at West Virginia University was named for him (1967)
- Meritorious Teaching Award of the Association of Southeastern Biologists (1971)
- Order of Vandalia of West Virginia University (1982)
- Honorary Doctor of Science degree, Waynesburg College (1957)
- Honorary Doctor of Science degree, West Virginia University (1974)
- Rt 7 to Kingwood is named after him (1975)

== Publications ==
- "Ecological studies on Spruce Mountain" (1928), Proc. W.Va. Acad. Sci. 2:36-39.
- "The plant ecology of Spruce Mountain, West Virginia" (1929), Ecology, 10:1-13.
- "Some additions to the Millspaugh checklist of West Virginia Spermatophytes" (1930), W.Va. Acad. Sci., 4:38-48 (with P.D. Strausbaugh).
- "Herbarium organization at West Virginia University" (1931), Proc. W.Va. Acad. Sci., 5:61-71.
- Common seed plants of the mid-Appalachian region (1931). xxiv + 305 p. (with P.D. Strausbaugh and Nelle Ammons).
- "Some aspects of the phytogeography of West Virginia" (1932), Torreya, 32:65-71.
- "Phymosia remota" (1932), Rhodora, 34:142-146 (with P.D. Strausbaugh).
- "Studies in the genus Scleria" (1934), Brittonia, 1:239-243.
- "The blister pine in West Virginia" (1934), Torreya, 34:92-93.
- "Contributions of Charles Frederick Millspaugh to the botany of West Virginia" (1935), Proc. W.Va. Acad. Sci., 8:82-93.
- "The American species of Scleria" (1936), Brittonia, 2:1-105.
- "The botanical exploration of West Virginia" (1936), Proc. W.Va. Acad. Sci., 10:47-64.
- "The type localities of some plants first described from West Virginia" (1936), Torreya, 36:7-13.
- "Additions to the Millspaugh checklist of West Virginia Spermatophytes" (1936). Proc. W.Va. Acad. Sci., 9:29-31.
- "Spring foray to Blackwater Falls and Spruce Knob, West Virginia" (1937), Castanea, 2:87-88.
- "Joint trip with the Southern Appalachian Botanical Club in Southern New Jersey" (1937). Torreya, 37:130-132.
- "The genus Carex in West Virginia" (1937), Proc. W.Va. Acad. Sci., 11:29-43.
- "Plant migrations and vegetational history of the Southern Appalachian region" (1938), Lilloa, 3:5-29.
- "Joint foray at Lancaster, Pennsylvania, June 15–19" (1938), Castanea, 3:79-81.
- "John Kunkel Small" (1938), Castanea, 3:27-28.
- "Gum Springs Bog" (1939), Castanea, 4.7-8.
- "Raymond H. Torrey" (1939), Castanea, 4:6-7.
- "A taxonomic revision of the genus Siphonychia" (1939), J. Elisha Mitchell Society, 55:339-345.
- "The flora of Roaring Plains, West Virginia" (1939), Proc. W.Va. Acad. Sci., 12:33-35.
- "The shale barren flora of West Virginia" (1939), Proc. W.Va. Acad. Sci., 14:27-36.
- "Spermatophytes new to West Virginia" (1940), Castanea, 5:20-23 (with H.A. Davis).
- "Notes on the mid-Appalachian species of Paronychia" (1940), Virginia J. Sci., 1:110-116.
- "A catalog of the vascular plants of West Virginia" (1940), Castanea, 5:29-68.
- "Travels of Asa Gray in western Virginia, 1843" (1940), Rhodora, 42:344-351.
- "New plant records for West Virginia" (1940), Torreya 40:5-9.
- "A new species of Paronychia from Mexico" (1941), Madrono 6:21-22.
- "Butomus umbellatus in America" (1941), Ohio J. Sci. 41:79-85.
- "The North America species of Paronychia" (1941), Amer. Midl. Naturalist 26:269-397.
- "Notes on some West Virginia plants" (1941), Castanea 6:86-88.
- "Additions to the catalogue of the vascular plants of West Virginia" (1941), 1. Proc. W.Va. Acad. Sci. 15:73-76 (with H.A. Davis).
- "The genus Scleria in extra-tropical South America" (1942), Lilloa 8:535-544.
- "Additions to the catalogue of the vascular plants of West Virginia" (1942), II. Proc. W.Va. Acad. Sci. 16:35-40 (with H.A. Davis).
- "Botanizing in the higher Alleghenies" (1943), Sci. Monthly 57:119-125.
- A new manual for the biology laboratory (1944), John Wiley & Sons, Inc. New York (with B.R. Weimer). 216 p.
- "West Virginia grasses" (1944), W.Va. Agric. Exp. Sta. Bull. 513. 96 p. (with Earl E. Berkley and H.A. Davis).
- "Two new species of Scleria from the upper Amazon Valley" (1945), J. Wash. Acad. Sci. 35:322.
- "The hollies of West Virginia" (1945), Castanea 10:57-60 (with Nelle Ammons).
- "The dogwoods of West Virginia" (1945), Castanea 10:88-91 (with Nelle Ammons).
- "Huckleberries, blueberries and cranberries of West Virginia" (1945), Castanea 10:103-109 (with Nelle Ammons).
- "Additions to the catalogue of the vascular plants of West Virginia" (1945), III Proc. W.Va. Acad. Sci. 17:27-30 (with H.A. Davis).
- "On the need for revision of the International Code of Botanical Nomenclature" (1945), Castanea 10:116-119.
- "The Southern Appalachian Botanical Club: Past and Future" (1945), Castanea 10:119-120.
- "Ramps" (1945), Castanea 10:110-112.
- "Wildflowers of the Appalachian shale barrens" (1946), Wild Flower, 22:13-18.
- Woody Plants of West Virginia in Winter Condition (1946), 124 p., 269 figs. Edwards Brothers, Ann Arbor, Michigan (with Nelle Ammons).
- "The gardens of Colombia" (1946), W.Va. Garden Club News, 10: 10–12. 1945; 10: 14–15.
- "The genus Scleria in Cuba" (1946), Mem. Soc. Cubana Hist. Nat. Felipe Foey, 18:43-56.
- "Scleria" (1947), In: Flora de Cuba, pp. 230–235.
- "John Lewis Sheldon" (1947), Science, 105:541.
- "Additions to the catalogue of the vascular plants of West Virginia" (1947), IV. Proc. W. Va. Acad. Sci., 18:26-29.
- "The flora of the Erie Islands" (1948), Franz Theo. Stone Lab. Countr., 9. viii + 107 p.
- "Spring wildflowers" (1948), W.Va. Univ. Bull. Ser., 59, 4–2. 100 p. (Reprinted 1950 by W.Va. Conserv. Comm., iv + 100 p.).
- "A syllabus of the Spermatophyta" (1948), 2nd ed. 145 p. West Virginia University, Morgantown.
- "The genus Scleria in Colombia" (1948), Caldasia, 5:17-32.
- "Additions to the catalogue of the vascular plants of West Virginia" (1948), V. Proc. W.Va. Acad. Sci., 19:23-26 (with H.A. Davis).
- "Man's first gardens" (1949), Garden Gleanings, No. 8, 3; No. 9. 2, 3, 8, 9.
- "Original treeless areas in West Virginia" (1949), J. Elisha Mitchell Sci. Soc., 65:306-310.
- "Notes on the plant geography of West Virginia" (1950), Castanea, 15:61-79.
- "Botanizing in the northern Andes" (1950), Wild Flower, 27:6-20.
- "The New Arboretum" (1951), W.Va. Univ. Alumni Mag., 16. 4, 21, 22.
- "Seleria tepuiensis Core sp. nov." (1951), Fieldiana, 28:52.
- "Joseph E. Harned" (1951), Castanea, 16:78, 79.
- "Danske Dandridge" (1951), Castanea, 16:138.-142.
- "Botanizing on Panther Knob, West Virginia" (1952), Wild Flower, 28:35-38.
- "The ranges of some plants of the Appalachian shale barrens" (1952), Castanea, 17:105-116.
- "Botany at West Virginia University, 1867-1900" (1952), Proc. W.Va. Acad. Sci., 24:72-78.
- "Lawrence William Nuttall" (1952), Castanea, 17:157-164.
- "Some new or otherwise noteworthy plants from West Virginia" (1952), Castanea, 17:165 (with P.D. Strausbaugh).
- "Flora of West Virginia, Part 1" (1952), W.Va. Univ. Bull., pp. 1–274, (with P.D. Strausbaugh).
- "The genus Scleria in Brazil" (1952), Rodriguesia, XV(27):137-162.
- "The Southern Appalachian Botanical Club: History of the club and its journal (1953), Castanea, Asa Gray Bull. n.s. 2:199.
- "Pendleton County, West Virginia" (1953), Tribio, 2:3-4.
- "Flora of West Virginia, Part II" (1953), W.Va. Univ. Bull., pp. 275–570 (with P.D. Strausbaugh).
- "Outline of the flora of West Virginia" (1954), W.Va. Bookstore, Morgantown, 150 p.
- "Cranberry Glades Natural Area" (1955), Wild Flower, 31:65-81.
- Plant taxonomy (1955), Prentice-Hall, Englewood Cliffs, New Jersey, 459 p.
- "Scutellaiia ovata in West Virginia" (1957), Castanea 22:139-140.
- "Flora of West Virginia, Part III" (1958), W.Va. Univ. Bull. pp. 571–860 (with P.D. Strausbaugh).
- Woody Plants in Winter (1958), Pittsburgh, Pennsylvania: Boxwood Press, 218 p. (with Nelle Ammons).
- "Biological investigations of Cheat Lake" (1959), Morgantown, West Virginia, 39 p. (with others).
- Entries "Arbutus", "Bloodroot", "Calendula", "Boehmeria", "Cinquefoil", "Duckweed", "Fire-weed", "Indian paintbrush", "Lungwort", "Meadow beauty", "Milkweed", "Oregon grape", "Ranunculus", "Smartweed", "Solomon's seal", "Spurge family", "Toadflax" (1960), In: World Book Encyclopedia.
- Plant life of West Virginia (1960), New York City: Scholar's Library, 224 p.
- Entries, "Arboretum", "Botanical gardens", "Herbarium", "Plant keys", "Plant names", "Plant taxonomic literature" (1960), In: McGraw-Hill Encyclopedia of Science and Technology.
- Morgantown Disciples (1960), Parsons, West Virginia: McClain Printing Company, 229 pgs.
- The poisonous plants of West Virginia (1961), W.Va. Dept. Agric., 91 p. (with John H. Rietz and William E. Gillespie).
- Articles on "Herbarium", "Rhammales" (1961), In: Reinhold Encyclopedia of the Biological Sciences.
- General Biology, 4th ed (1961), New York, London, 555 p. (with P.D. Strausbaugh and B.R. Weimer).
- A New Manual for the Biology Laboratory, 3rd ed (1961), John Wiley & Sons, Inc., New York. 263 p. (with B.R. Weimer and R.B. Clarkson).
- Bibliography of West Virginia Plant Life (1962), Scholar's Library, New York. 46 p. (with William H. Gillespie and Betty J. Gillespie).
- "Terra Alta Biological Station" (1962), Castanea, 27:57-59.
- "The varieties of Rudbeckia hirta" (1962), Castanea, 27:61, 62.
- "The Call of the Wildflowers: West Virginia's first annual Wildflower Pilgrimage" (1962), May 18, W.Va. Conservation, May, pp, 1–3.
- Article, "Widdringtonia" (1963), Encyclopedia Americana.
- "Flora of West Virginia, Part IV" (1964), W.Va. Univ. Bull., pp 861–1075 (with P.D. Strausbaugh).
- "Flora of West Virginia" (Introductory section) (1964), W.Va. Univ. Bull., pp i-xxxi (with P.D. Strausbaugh).
- "The genus Sclaria in the Yucatan Peninsula" (1965), Wrightia, 3:141-160.
- "Scleria" (1965, In: Botany of the Guayan Highlands, Mem. N.Y. Bot. Gard., 12:54-69.
- Important Stock Poisoning Plants in West Virginia (1966), W.Va. Dept. Agric. Leaflet (with William H. Gillespie).
- Avoid poisonous plants (1966), W.Va. Dept. Agric. Leaflet (with William H. Gillespie).
- Spring wildflowers (1966), W.Va. Dept. Agric. Leaflet.
- "Plants and Animals of the Bible" (1966), In: Bible Study Helps, Supplement to World Bible 250D, pp. 36–42.
- Mid-summer Flowers of Field and Meadow (1966), W.Va. Dept. Agric. Leaflet.
- "Perry Daniel Strausbaugh" (1966), Bull. Torrey Bot. Club, 93:138-140.
- Vegetation of West Virginia (1966), McClain Printing Co., Parsons, West Virginia. 217 p.
- "Scleria" (1966), In: Flora of Texas, Vol. 1, pp. 383–391.
- "Wildflowers of the Alleghenies" (1967), J. Alleghenies, 4(l):I, 2–4.
- "Natural history of the Cass Railroad" (1967), 36 pgs (with others).
- West Virginia plants in Autumn (1967), W.Va. Dept. Agric. Leaflet.
- "Ethnobotany of the Southern Appalachian Aborigines" (1967), Econ. Bot., 21:198-214.
- "Notes on West Virginia plants 1: Eastward migration of Ambrosia bidentata" (1967), Castanea, 32:192.
- "Notes on West Virginia plants II: Thelypteris simulata in West Virginia" (1968), Castanea, 33:80.
- "The Range of Carex trichocarpa Muhl." (1968), Castanea, 33:151, 152.
- Forest Trees of West Virginia, 6th ed (1968), W.Va. Dept. Nat. Res. (with Roland L. Guthrie), 120 pgs.
- "The Plants and Animals of the Bible" (1968), In: Supplement to the Family Heritage Bible, pp. 20–27.
- "West Virginia's Blooming Schedule" (1968), Outdoor West Virginia, Part 1, March, pp. 30–33; Part 2, April, pp. 26–28.
- Common Native Shrubs of West Virginia (1968), W.Va. Dept. Agric. Leaflet.
- "The Botany of Ice Mountain, West Virginia" (1968), Castanea, 33:345-348.
- "Blooming Dates, West Virginia's Flowering Shrubs" (1969), Outdoor West Virginia, March, pp. 16–18.
- West Virginia Grasses (1969), W.Va. Dept. Agric. Leaflet (with James B. Newman).
- "West Virginia Grasses" (1969), W.Va. Dept. Agric. [Leaflet] (with James B. Newman).
- "Silvical characteristics of the five upland oaks" (1971), Proc. The Oak Symposium, pp. 19–22. N.E. For. Exp. Sta. USFS. Upper Darby, Pennsylvania.
- "The Granulose Variety of the Virginia Dragonhead - Dracocephalum virginianum L. (Physostegia virginiana (L.) Benth.)" (1972), In: "Notes & News", Castanea 37:301.
- The Monongalia Story: A Bicentennial History, Vol. I: Prelude (1974), Parsons, W.Va.: McClain Printing Co.
- The Wondrous Year: West Virginia Through the Seasons (1975), Seneca Books, Inc., Grantsville, West Virginia. 208 p.
- Chronicles of Core (1975, 3rd ed.), McClain Printing Co., Parsons, West Virginia, 310 pgs.
- The Monongalia Story: A Bicentennial History, Vol. II: The Pioneers (1976), Parsons, W.Va.: McClain Printing Co.
- The Monongalia Story: A Bicentennial History, Vol. III: Discord (1979), Parsons, W.Va.: McClain Printing Co.
- "Kalmia angustifolia in West Virginia" (1980), In: "Notes & News", Castanea 45:217-218.
- The Monongalia Story: A Bicentennial History, Vol. IV: Industrialization (1984), Parsons, W.Va.: McClain Printing Co.
- The Monongalia Story: A Bicentennial History, Vol. V: Sophistication (1984), Parsons, W.Va.: McClain Printing Co.
- "The Monongalia River", 149-152 pp. in Bartlett, Richard A., editor (1984), Rolling Rivers: An Encyclopedia of America's Rivers, McGraw-Hill Book Co., New York City.
