= Carroll Van West =

American historian

- Born: Murfreesboro, Tennessee, U.S.
- Education: Middle Tennessee State University; University of Tennessee; College of William & Mary
- Employer: Middle Tennessee State University

Carroll Van West is an American historian. He is the Tennessee State Historian and a professor of history at Middle Tennessee State University. He is the author or editor of several books about Montana and Tennessee.

== Early life ==
Carroll Van West was born in Murfreesboro, Tennessee. He graduated from Middle Tennessee State University, where he earned a Bachelor of Arts degree in 1977. He earned a master's degree from the University of Tennessee in 1978 and a PhD from the College of William and Mary in 1982.

== Career ==
Van West is a professor of history at his alma mater, Middle Tennessee State University, where he is also the director of the MTSU Center for Historic Preservation. He is the author or editor of several books about Montana and Tennessee.

Van West succeeded Walter Durham as the Tennessee State Historian in July 2013.

== Selected works ==
- Van West, Carroll (1986). Traveler's Companion to Montana History. Helena, Montana: Montana Historical Society Press. ISBN 9780917298127. OCLC 906469480.
- Van West, Carroll (1993). Capitalism on the Frontier Billings and the Yellowstone Valley in the Nineteenth Century. Lincoln, Nebraska: University of Nebraska Press. ISBN 9780803247550.
- Van West, Carroll (2001). Tennessee's New Deal Landscape: A Guidebook. Knoxville, Tennessee: University of Tennessee Press. ISBN 9781572331082. OCLC 800341968.
- Van West, Carroll, ed. (2002). Trial and Triumph: Essays in Tennessee's African American History. Knoxville, Tennessee: University of Tennessee Press. ISBN 9781572332041. OCLC 606909077.
- Van West, Carroll, ed. (2004). A History of Tennessee Arts: Creating Traditions, Expanding Horizons. Knoxville, Tennessee: University of Tennessee Press. ISBN 9781572332393. OCLC 52377497.
- Van West, Carroll (2015). Nashville Architecture: A Guide to the City. Knoxville, Tennessee: University of Tennessee Press. ISBN 9781572339200. OCLC 903363549.
