= West Virginia Division of Forestry =

State agency of West Virginia

West Virginia Division of Forestry is a government agency of the U.S. state of West Virginia. It is a division of the West Virginia Department of Commerce. The West Virginia Division of Forestry is responsible for regulating and maintaining West Virginia's state forests and other state-controlled forest areas.
