= Caldasia =

- Discipline: Biology
- Language: English, Spanish
- Edited by: Carlos Eduardo Sarmiento Monroy

Publication details
- History: 1940-present
- Publisher: Institute of Natural Sciences, National University of Colombia (Colombia)
- Frequency: Quarterly
- Open access: Yes
- License: Creative Commons Attribution
- Impact factor: 0.562 (2020)

Standard abbreviations
- ISO 4: Caldasia

Indexing
- CODEN: CALDAK
- ISSN: 0366-5232 (print); 2357-3759 (web)
- LCCN: s41000032
- OCLC no.: 645430855

Links
- Journal homepage; Online access; Online archive

Caldasia is a quarterly peer-reviewed open access scientific journal published by the Instituto de Ciencias Naturales (Universidad Nacional de Colombia) since 1940. Articles are written in Spanish or English. The journal covers biodiversity topics in a wide sense, including the documentation, understanding, or conservation of biological diversity and thus accepts papers on botany, zoology, ecology, biodiversity, biogeography, taxonomy, systematics, conservation, anthropology, and related disciplines. It publishes full papers, reviews, or short communications. The journal charges no publication fees to authors.

== Abstracting and indexing ==
The journal is abstracted and indexed in Biological Abstracts, BIOSIS Previews, CAB Abstracts, Science Citation Index Expanded, Scopus, and The Zoological Record.
