= Core Arboretum =

Arboretum in Morgantown, West Virginia

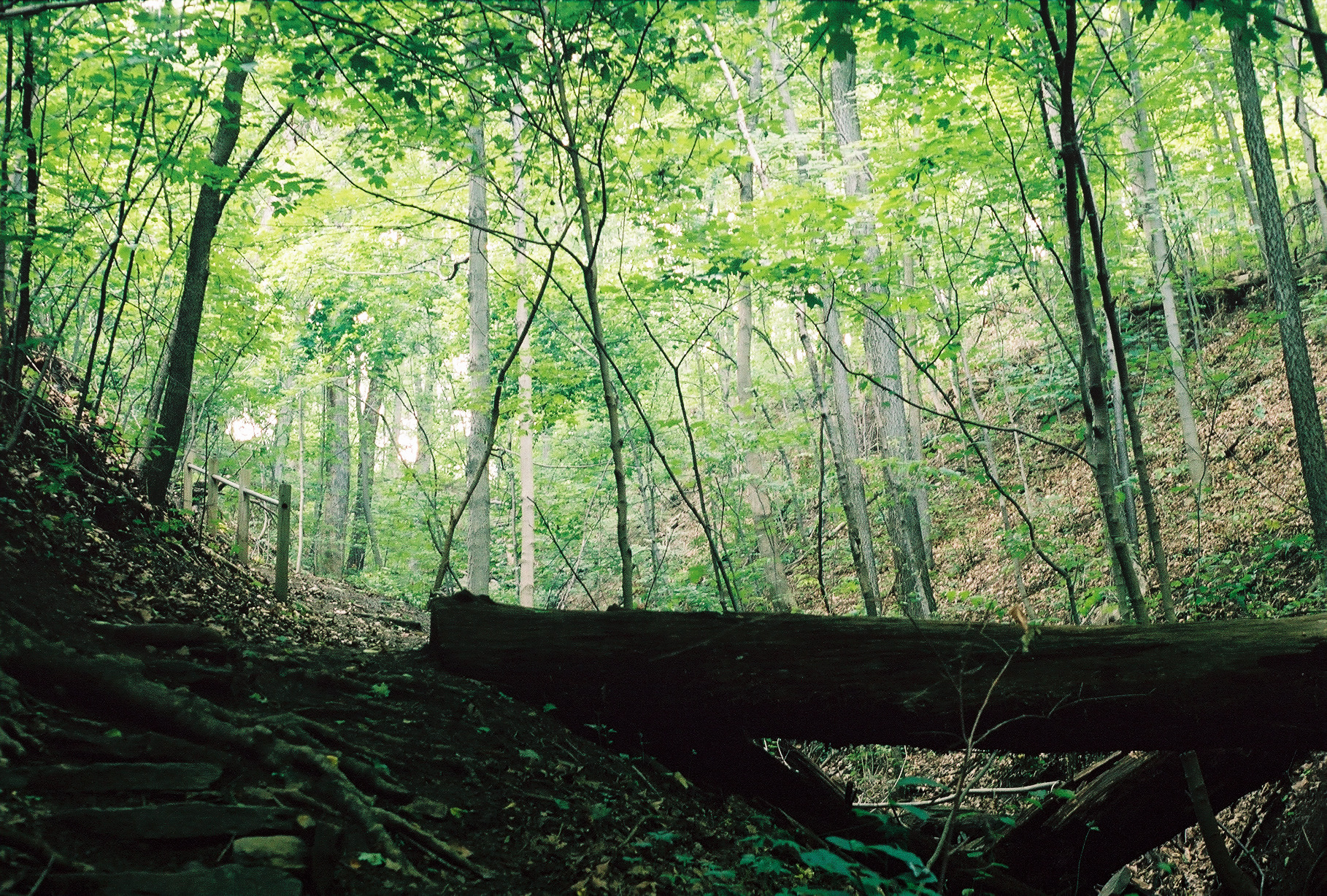
- Trail in Core Arboretum

- Location within West Virginia
- Location: Monongalia, West Virginia, United States
- Coordinates: 39°38′44″N 79°58′39″W
- Area: 91 acres (37 ha)
- Elevation: 997 ft (304 m)
- Established: 1948
- Owner: West Virginia University
- Website: arboretum.wvu.edu

The Core Arboretum is a 91-acre (37 ha) arboretum owned by West Virginia University and located on Monongahela Boulevard in Morgantown, West Virginia. It is open to the public daily without charge.

The Arboretum's history began in 1948 when the university acquired its site. Professor Earl Lemley Core (1902-1984), chairman of the Biology Department, then convinced President Irvin Stewart to set the property aside for the study of biology and botany. In 1975 the Arboretum was named in Core's honor.

The Arboretum is now managed by the WVU Department of Biology, and consists of mostly old-growth forest on steep hillside and Monongahela River flood plain. It includes densely wooded areas with 3.5 miles (5.6 km) of walking trails, as well as 3 acres (12,000 m^{2}) of lawn planted with specimen trees.

The Arboretum has a variety of natural habitats in which several hundred species of native WV trees, shrubs, and herbaceous plants may be found. Some of the large trees are likely over 200 years old. The Arboretum is well known as a superb site to see spring ephemeral wildflowers from late March to early May. Varied habitats and riverside location also make the area an excellent site to observe birds and animals.

== See also ==
- List of botanical gardens and arboretums in West Virginia
