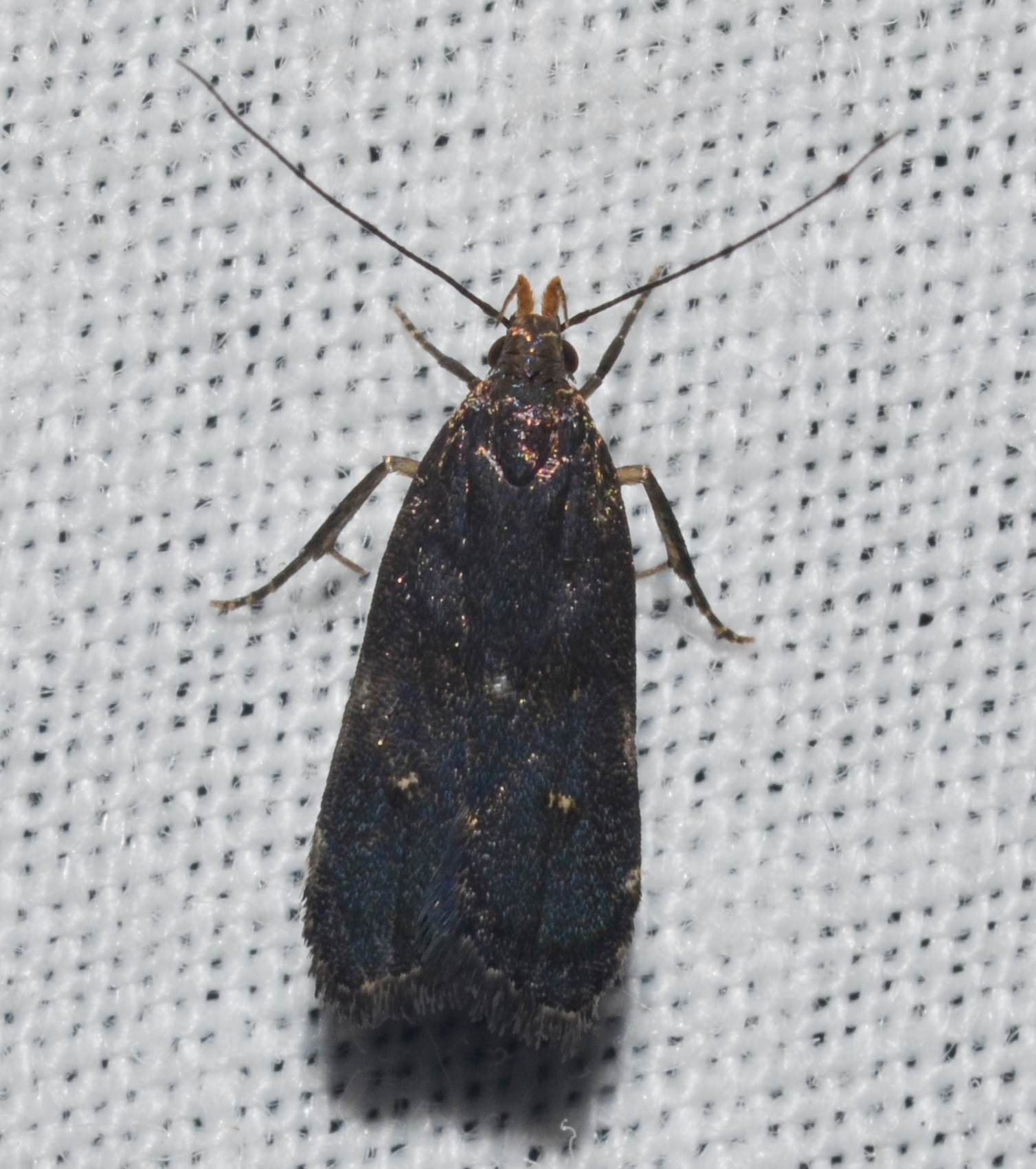

Scientific classification
- Kingdom: Animalia
- Phylum: Arthropoda
- Clade: Pancrustacea
- Class: Insecta
- Order: Lepidoptera
- Family: Gelechiidae
- Genus: Dichomeris
- Species: D. juncidella

Binomial name
- Dichomeris juncidella (Clemens, 1860)

Synonyms
- Trichotaphe juncidella Clemens, 1860; Gelechia pallipalpis Walker, 1864; Depressaria dubitella Chambers, 1872

= Dichomeris juncidella =

Species of moth

Dichomeris juncidella is a moth in the family Gelechiidae. It was described by James Brackenridge Clemens in 1860. It is found in North America, where it has been recorded from Nova Scotia, southern Quebec and southern Ontario to Florida, Texas and Nebraska.

The wingspan is about 13 mm. The forewings are dark brown almost blackish brown, with an ochreous-orange spot on the disk, one on the subcostal nervure nearer the base, one beneath it in the fold, and one on the end of the disk, all of the same hue. On the costa near the tip is a small ochreous-orange spot. The hindwings are dull yellowish brown. Adults are on wing from March to October.

The larvae feed on Ambrosia artemisiifolia, Artemisia trifida, Solidago, Aster, Helianthus tuberosus and Aralia spinosa.
