= Encyclopedia of Appalachia =

The Encyclopedia of Appalachia is an encyclopedia dedicated to the region, people, culture, history, and geography of Appalachia, as defined by the Appalachian Regional Commission.

== Appalachia ==
Appalachia is a 205,000-square-mile area that follows the spine of the Appalachian Mountains from southern New York to northern Mississippi. It includes all of West Virginia and parts of 12 other states: Alabama, Georgia, Kentucky, Maryland, Mississippi, New York, North Carolina, Ohio, Pennsylvania, South Carolina, Tennessee, and Virginia. Forty-two percent of the population is rural, compared with 20 percent of the national population, although the region also includes urban areas, such as Pittsburgh and Chattanooga.

== Encyclopedia ==
The encyclopedia is 1,832 pages long and contains over 2,000 entries. Produced by the Center of Excellence for Appalachian Studies and Services at East Tennessee State University (ETSU), Rudy Abramson and Dr. Jean Haskell, are the two main editors. Jill Oxendine served as managing editor. The volume was published in March 2006 by the University of Tennessee Press. It includes a foreword by William Ferris, former chair of the National Endowment for the Humanities, who called the encyclopedia "truly a feast of information about its region . . . a remarkably detailed portrait of a landscape that runs from New York to Mississippi.” The volume includes an appreciation by Henry Louis Gates Jr., Alphonse Fletcher University Professor and Director of the Hutchins Center for African and African American Research at Harvard University, who is a West Virginia native. Gates wrote that the encyclopedia "lays out for everyone else what we who grew up there have always known. Appalachia is a rich and beautiful land steeped in tradition and open to change. It is home to countless storytellers and stories without end. Both its lushness and its rockiness teach us to make our way in the world, but Appalachia never leaves us."

The volume is available from University of Tennessee Press. An online edition was initiated in 2011, which included only the Music section, but was discontinued. The ETSU Center of Excellence for Appalachian Studies and Services, now directed by Ron Roach, has begun a project to produce an updated, online version of the encyclopedia.

== Organization ==
The print version has 1832 pages. It is organized into five main sections with respective subsections:

=== The Landscape ===
- Geology
- Ecology
- Environment

=== The People ===
- Family and Community
- Images and Icons
- Race, Ethnicity, and Identity
- Settlement and Migration
- Urban Appalachian Experience

=== Work and the Economy ===
- Agriculture
- Business, Industry, and Technology
- Labor
- Tourism
- Transportation

=== Cultural Traditions ===
- Architecture
- Crafts
- Folklore and Folklife
- Food and Cooking
- Humor
- Language
- Literature
- Music this section is online here
- Performing Arts
- Religion
- Sports and Recreation
- Visual Arts

=== Institutions ===
- Cultural Institutions
- Education
- Government
- Health
- Media

== Online edition ==
- online version of Encyclopedia of Appalachia section on Music pp 1109 to 1224 only
