= Castanea (journal) =

- Discipline: Botany
- Language: English
- Edited by: Christopher Randle

Publication details
- History: 1936–present
- Publisher: Southern Appalachian Botanical Society (United States)
- Frequency: Biannually (2017–present); Quarterly (1943–2016); 8/year (1937–1942)

Standard abbreviations
- ISO 4: Castanea

Indexing
- ISSN: 0008-7475 (print); 1938-4386 (web)
- LCCN: agr37000334
- OCLC no.: 183413013

Links
- Journal homepage

Castanea, The Journal of the Southern Appalachian Botanical Society, is a biannual, peer-reviewed scientific journal published by the Southern Appalachian Botanical Society. It was established in 1936 and covers the botany of the eastern United States, in particular systematics, floristics, ecology, physiology, and biochemistry. The journal name Castanea comes from the genus of chestnuts that were fresh in the minds of the founders of the society when the journal was established; the chestnut blight ravaged the American Chestnut, Castanea dentata, in the early part of the twentieth century and drastically changed the plant communities of the Appalachians.

According to the Journal Citation Reports, the journal has a 2021 impact factor of 0.255. Over the years 2006–2021, the impact factor has ranged from 0.255 to 0.7, with an average of about 0.35.

== List of editors ==
- Earl Lemley Core, 1936–1971
- Jessie Clovis, 1972–1982
- Audrey D. Mellichamp, 1982–2011
- John Pascarella, 2009-2014
- Christopher Randle, 2014-2024
