= Tennessee Historical Society =

U.S. state historical society

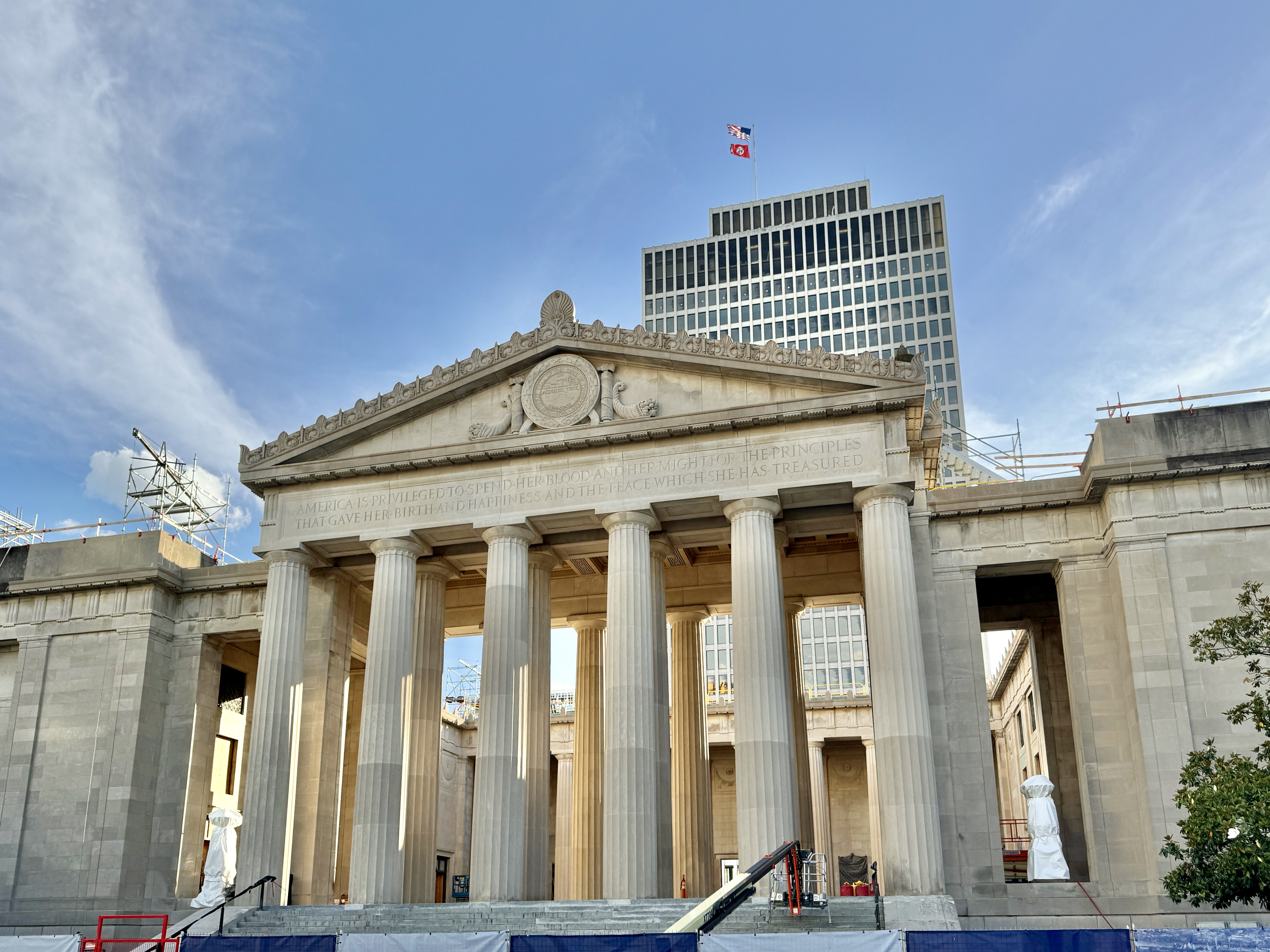
- The Tennessee Historical Society is housed in the War Memorial Building in Nashville.
- Formation: 1849
- Type: Historical society
- Location: Nashville, Tennessee, U.S.

The Tennessee Historical Society is a historical society for the U.S. state of Tennessee. It was established in 1849. Its founding president from 1849 to 1856 was Nathaniel Cross, a Princeton-educated professor of Ancient Languages at the University of Nashville.

== See also ==
- List of historical societies in Tennessee
