= Southern Appalachian Botanical Society =

US scientific societies

The Southern Appalachian Botanical Society (formerly the Southern Appalachian Botanical Club) is an American botanical society formed in 1935 at West Virginia University. The focus of the society has gradually changed and now includes the botany of the entire eastern United States, including the taxonomy, biogeography, ecology, physiology, and biochemistry of plants. The society has about 500 members.

== History ==
The society was founded in 1935 and produced its first journal in 1936. The majority (52%) of the first members were from West Virginia, and early leaders included Earl Core, Perry Daniel Strausbaugh, and Elizabeth Ann Bartholomew. The early years of the society were characterized by botanical forays, or expeditions, that served to build relationships and communication among Appalachian botanists and to foster botanical exploration. The Club organised and curated an exsiccata-like specimen series with the first delivery edited in 1939 under the title Southern Appalachian Botanical Club. First Distribution of Southeastern Plants. The 30th edition was distributed in 1977. Another series of duplicate herbarium specimens was sent out starting with 1958, under the title Southern Appalachian Botanical Club. First Distribution of North American Plants with the last edition in 1976.

The society expanded its geographical focus, adapted its governance, and modernized its journal in the 1980s and early 1990s, and the name was officially changed to Southern Appalachian Botanical Society in 1992. The history of the society was put into the context of Appalachian botanical heritage in a 1994 movie entitled And Who Will Weigh the Mountains. The archives of the society are housed at West Virginia University.

== Publications ==
The society publishes Castanea, a quarterly journal of botanical research. The first issue of the society's journal was issued as The Journal of the Southern Appalachian Botanical Club in 1936. Articles cover topics such as the systematics of eastern U.S. plants, rare and endangered plants, local floras, changes in species distributions, physiological ecology, and the ecological analysis of vegetation types. Larger studies are produced as part of an irregular series entitled Castanea, Occasional Papers in Eastern Botany.

The newsletter Chinquapin was first published in 1993 to provide news about the society, to answer questions about botanical problems, to present informative articles, and to act as an outlet for member questions or observations.

== Activities ==
Each year the society has an April meeting in conjunction with the Association of Southeastern Biologists and the Society of Herbarium Curators. The meetings, held in various southeastern states, include lectures, posters, banquets, and local field trips to botanically interesting areas. The society also supports the Spring Wildflower Pilgrimage in Great Smoky Mountains National Park.

== Awards ==
The Richard and Minnie Windler Award rewards outstanding research in the area of plant taxonomy and is given annually for the best article published in Castanea. The Elizabeth Ann Bartholomew Award recognizes people who have made significant contributions to southern Appalachian botany, to the society, or to botany through professional and public service. The society funds student research projects through the Earl Core Student Research Award. These awards are announced at the annual meeting in April, in addition to an award for the best student lecture presentation and best student poster presentation.
