= University of Tennessee Press =

American academic publisher

- Parent company: University of Tennessee
- Founded: 1940; 86 years ago
- Country of origin: United States
- Headquarters location: Knoxville, Tennessee
- Distribution: Chicago Distribution Center
- Publication types: Books
- Official website: utpress.org

The University of Tennessee Press is a university press associated with the University of Tennessee.

UT Press was established in 1940 by the University of Tennessee Board of Trustees.

The University of Tennessee Press issues about 35 books each year. Its specialties include scholarly lists in African American studies, southern history, Appalachian studies, material culture, and literary studies, as well as books on regional topics written for general readers.

Notable books about Tennessee or Appalachia that were issued by the Press include:

- Horace Kephart's Our Southern Highlanders (1976)
- Cades Cove: A Southern Appalachian Community, by Durwood Dunn (1988)
- Tennesseans and Their History by Paul Bergeron, Stephen Ash, and Jeannette Keith (1999)
- The Dictionary of Smoky Mountain English by Michael Montgomery and Joseph S. Hall (2004)
- Bobby Lovett's The Civil Rights Movement in Tennessee: A Narrative History, winner of the 2005 Tennessee History Book Award.
- Encyclopedia of Appalachia, published in 2006 in association with the Center for Appalachian Studies and Services of East Tennessee State University. This 2,000-page resource, edited by Rudy Abramson and Jean Haskell, contains contributions from nearly 700 scholars.

Six UT Press books related to Appalachia, including the Encyclopedia of Appalachia, have won the Appalachian Studies Association's annual Weatherford Award.

Four UT Press books in the field of material culture have won the Abbott Lowell Cummings Award:

- Charles Martin, Hollybush: Folk Building and Social Change in an Appalachian Community (1985)
- Bernard L. Herman, Architecture and Rural Life in Central Delaware, 1700–1900 (1987)
- Kingston Heath, The Patina of Place: Cultural Weathering of a New England Industrial Landscape (2001)
- J. Ritchie Garrison, Two Carpenters: Architecture and Building in Early New England, 1799–1859 (2007)

Some other noteworthy books that UT Press has published are:

- Charles Hudson's The Southeastern Indians (1976)
- Jo Ann Gibson Robinson's The Montgomery Bus Boycott and the Women Who Started It (1978)
- Richard Beale Davis's Intellectual Life in the Colonial South, for which Davis received the 1978 National Book Award in history
- Warren Grabau's Ninety-eight Days: A Geographer's View of the Vicksburg Campaign (2000), which was named an "Outstanding Academic Title" by the magazine Choice: Current Reviews for Academic Libraries
- Laura Jarmon's Wishbone: Reference and Interpretation in Black Folk Narrative (2003), another of Choice magazine's Outstanding Academic Title.

A major online publication project of the UT Press is the Tennessee Encyclopedia of History and Culture, created in cooperation with the Tennessee Historical Society. When it first appeared in 2002, this was the second online state encyclopedia ever produced. The UT Press continues to update and expand it. According to UT Press, its long-term plans include the creation of digital editions of the Encyclopedia of Appalachia and The Dictionary of Smoky Mountain English.

== See also ==
- List of English-language book publishing companies
- List of university presses
