= National Register of Historic Places listings in Nicholas County, West Virginia =

Location of Nicholas County in West Virginia

This is a list of the National Register of Historic Places listings in Nicholas County, West Virginia.

This is intended to be a complete list of the properties and districts on the National Register of Historic Places in Nicholas County, West Virginia, United States. The locations of National Register properties and districts for which the latitude and longitude coordinates are included below, may be seen in a Google map.

There are 13 properties and districts listed on the National Register in the county.

This National Park Service list is complete through NPS recent listings posted March 21, 2025.

Contents: Counties in West Virginia

Barbour - Berkeley - Boone - Braxton - Brooke - Cabell - Calhoun - Clay - Doddridge - Fayette - Gilmer - Grant - Greenbrier - Hampshire - Hancock - Hardy - Harrison - Jackson - Jefferson - Kanawha - Lewis - Lincoln - Logan - Marion - Marshall - Mason - McDowell - Mercer - Mineral - Mingo - Monongalia - Monroe - Morgan - Nicholas - Ohio - Pendleton - Pleasants - Pocahontas - Preston - Putnam - Raleigh - Randolph - Ritchie - Roane - Summers - Taylor - Tucker - Tyler - Upshur - Wayne - Webster - Wetzel - Wirt - Wood - Wyoming

== Current listings ==
	Name on the Register	Image	Date listed	Location	City or town	Description
1	Beaver Mill		July 25, 2001 (#01000776)	West Webster Rd. 38°19′44″N 80°39′55″W	Craigsville	
2	Brock Hotel	Brock Hotel	July 9, 1993 (#93000615)	1400 Webster Rd. 38°17′00″N 80°50′41″W	Summersville	
3	Dr. Flavius Brown House		January 7, 2003 (#02001053)	Old Wilderness Rd. 38°16′38″N 80°50′59″W	Summersville	
4	James B. Carden House		August 2, 2001 (#01000773)	1082 Country Rd. 38°17′11″N 80°57′04″W	Summersville	
5	Carnifex Ferry State Park	Carnifex Ferry State Park	July 24, 1974 (#74002018)	South of Kesslers Cross Lanes off WV 129; 38°12′24″N 80°56′14″W	Kesslers Cross Lanes	
6	Downtown Richwood Historic District	Downtown Richwood Historic District	July 25, 2001 (#01000778)	Roughly including portions of Main St., Oakford Ave., and Commercial St. 38°13′28″N 80°32′03″W	Richwood	
7	Capt. John Halstead Farm		December 15, 1998 (#98001475)	Whitewater Rd. (County Route 9); 38°20′05″N 80°56′21″W	Kesslers Cross Lanes	
8	Martin Hamilton House		November 22, 1999 (#99001403)	WV 39; 38°17′14″N 80°51′37″W	Summersville	
9	Lockwood Historic District		December 16, 1998 (#98001468)	Roughly along WV 39; 38°15′27″N 81°01′42″W	Lockwood	
10	Mason-Drennen House		December 15, 1998 (#98001474)	Junction of West Virginia Routes 39 and WV 129; 38°16′02″N 80°59′32″W	Drennen	
11	Nicholas County Bank	Nicholas County Bank	November 2, 2000 (#00001314)	800 Main St. 38°16′51″N 80°51′03″W	Summersville	
12	Nicholas County Courthouse	Nicholas County Courthouse	August 16, 1991 (#91001014)	700 Main St. 38°15′45″N 80°51′05″W	Summersville	
13	Nicholas County High School	Nicholas County High School	March 27, 1989 (#89000185)	Main St. 38°16′51″N 80°51′28″W	Summersville	This is the former high school building; the current property is not listed.

== See also ==
- List of National Historic Landmarks in West Virginia
- National Register of Historic Places listings in West Virginia
