= Summit Lake (West Virginia) =

Lake in West Virginia, United States

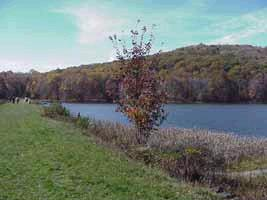
- looking west along the dam

- Location within West Virginia
- Location: Greenbrier County, West Virginia
- Coordinates: 38.249°N 80.437°W
- Primary inflows: Coats Run
- Basin countries: United States
- Surface area: 43 acres (17 ha)

Summit Lake is a 43-acre (170,000 m^{2}) cold water reservoir located in Greenbrier County, West Virginia in the Gauley Ranger District of the Monongahela National Forest. The reservoir is formed by the impoundment of the waters of two forks of Coats Run, a small tributary of the North Fork of the Cherry River. There have been attempts to rename the lake in honor of Carl E. Gainer, a politician from nearby Richwood. These efforts, however, have had limited success with local residents and the United States Forest Service.

In times of drought when the Cherry River becomes too shallow, the lake can be used to supply Richwood's municipal water system.

== Recreation ==
The lake is popular among fisherman, as it has an abundant supply of panfish and bass within its waters. The West Virginia Division of Natural Resources also stocks the lake with trout several times per year.

The area surrounding the lake includes a primitive 33-site campground and access to the Cranberry Backcountry. The Cranberry River, a popular trout stream, can be accessed via a somewhat-steep two-mile (3 km) hike along Fisherman's Trail. There are several other hiking trails of varying degrees of difficulty in proximity to Summit Lake, including one that circumnavigates the entire body of water. Some of these trails are used for cross-country skiing during winter months.

Low-horsepower motor boats and row boats are permitted on the lake. Swimming is prohibited except during the annual Scenic Mountain Triathlon.

== See also ==
- Cranberry Wilderness
- Cranberry Glades Botanical Area
