= New Hope, Nicholas County, West Virginia =

New Hope
- Unincorporated community
- Nickname: Fenwick Mountain
- Location within the state of West Virginia
- Coordinates: 38°13′6″N 80°36′50″W
- Country: United States
- State: West Virginia
- County: Nicholas
- Time zone: UTC-5 (Eastern (EST))
  - Summer (DST): UTC-4 (EDT)
- ZIP codes: 26261

New Hope (also called Fenwick Mountain) is an unincorporated community in Nicholas County in the U.S. state of West Virginia. New Hope lies between the communities of Fenwick and Nettie along West Virginia Routes 20 and 39. New Hope is also the location of nearby Richwood's municipal airport. Fenwick Mountain has three churches, New Hope Baptist Church, the Macedonia United Methodist Church and the Revival Center. Fenwick Mountain is predominantly a Christian community based on the timber and coal mining industries. Fenwick Mountain also has a Community Center which was converted from the old New Hope Elementary School. The New Hope Community also known as Fenwick Mountain receives its water supply from neighboring city of Richwood. Fenwick Mountain is also home of the famous Spencer Lumber Company.
