= Fenwick, West Virginia =

Fenwick
- Census-designated place (CDP)
- Fenwick
- Location within the state of West Virginia
- Coordinates: 38°13′43″N 80°34′56″W
- Country: United States
- State: West Virginia
- County: Nicholas

Area
  - Total: 0.153 sq mi (0.40 km^{2})
  - Land: 0.141 sq mi (0.37 km^{2})
  - Water: 0.012 sq mi (0.031 km^{2})

Population (2020)
  - Total: 69
  - Density: 490/sq mi (190/km^{2})
- Time zone: UTC-5 (Eastern (EST))
  - Summer (DST): UTC-4 (EDT)

Fenwick is a census-designated place (CDP) in eastern Nicholas County, West Virginia, United States, adjacent to and immediately west of Richwood. As of the 2020 census, its population was 69 (down from 116 at the 2010 census). The town is situated at the bottomland surrounding the mouth of the Big Laurel Creek at its confluence with the Cherry River and has an elevation of 649 m (2129 ft). Fenwick is also the location of the convergence of three state highways: WV 55, WV 39, and WV 20 and acts as the western terminus of the Highland Scenic Highway.
