= Belva =

Belva can refer to:

== People ==
- Belva Davis (born 1932), American journalist
- Belva Gaertner (1884–1965), a woman acquitted of murder, the inspiration for the character of Velma Kelly in Chicago
- Belva Ann Lockwood (1830–1917), American lawyer, politician and early feminist, first female presidential candidate
- Belva Plain (1915–2010), American author

== Other uses ==
- Belva, West Virginia, United States, an unincorporated community and census-designated place
- Belva, North Carolina, United States, an unincorporated community in Madison County - see List of unincorporated communities in North Carolina
- La belva, a 1970 Italian Western film
