= Tolbert, West Virginia =

- Unincorporated community
- Location within West Virginia Location within the United States
- Coordinates: 38°11′48″N 80°41′27″W
- Country: United States
- State: West Virginia
- County: Nicholas
- Elevation: 2,717 ft (828 m)
- Time zone: UTC-5 (Eastern (EST))
  - Summer (DST): UTC-4 (EDT)
- Area codes: 304 & 681
- GNIS feature ID: 1557103

Tolbert is an unincorporated community in Nicholas County, West Virginia, United States. Tolbert is located on West Virginia Route 20, 9 miles (14 km) west-southwest of Richwood.
