= Levi J. Dean =

American architect

- Born: Levi Johnson Dean; January 9, 1878; Little Otter, Braxton County, West Virginia, USA Gassaway, West Virginia
- Died: September 1951 (aged 73); Huntington, Cabell County, West Virginia, US
- Occupation: Architect
- Buildings: Ricketts House, Huntington, West Virginia

Levi Johnson Dean (1878-1951) was a West Virginia-based architect.

== Biography ==
He was born in Gassaway, Braxton County, West Virginia in 1878. His father, George W. Dean, served in the Confederate army and was a boat builder and millwright. His mother was Mary Jane Davis and he was one of thirteen children. Levi J. Dean married Ada Leonora Johnson in 1901, and they had three children. Following Ada's death in 1910, he married Susie Ada Turner in 1912, and they had three children. Two of these, Keith and Brooks, became architects and practiced with Levi in the Huntington firm of Dean and Dean.

Dean studied architecture in Scranton, Pennsylvania. He began his practice, with mechanics, in Charleston and relocated to Huntington in 1906. He briefly formed a partnership, but later went into business alone in 1910.

Dean designed and built an office for himself in 1927 in east Huntington, in the Moorish Revival style. After the sons joined the firm the offices were relocated to downtown Huntington.

Levi Dean completed a large number of commissions in his day. His work is distributed throughout West Virginia and into Kentucky and Ohio. He worked in practically every county in West Virginia. The majority of his commissions were school buildings and churches. He also did a large number of banks, county courthouses and additions, and private residences. The majority of the residential commissions were centered in Huntington, where he had a loyal following. During the Depression he performed a number of commissions for the Works Progress Administration.

== Selected works ==
=== Individual listings on the National Register of Historic Places ===
- 1924-1925: Ricketts House (Huntington, West Virginia), listed on the National Register of Historic Places in 1994.
- 1940: R. T. Price House, Williamson, West Virginia, listed on the National Register of Historic Places in 1991.
- 1940: Nicholas County Courthouse, Summersville, West Virginia, listed on the National Register of Historic Places in 1991.

=== Contributing properties to historic districts ===
- Clendenin Historic District
- Downtown Richwood Historic District
- Matewan Historic District
- Ripley Historic District
