= Woodbine, West Virginia =

- Unincorporated community
- Location within West Virginia Location within the United States
- Coordinates: 38°17′55″N 80°36′52″W
- Country: United States
- State: West Virginia
- County: Nicholas
- Elevation: 1,939 ft (591 m)
- Time zone: UTC-5 (Eastern (EST))
  - Summer (DST): UTC-4 (EDT)
- Area codes: 304 & 681
- GNIS feature ID: 1553512

Woodbine is an unincorporated community in Nicholas County, West Virginia, United States. Woodbine is located at the mouth of the Cranberry River at the Gauley River, 3 miles (4.8 km) southeast of Craigsville.

The community most likely was named for the woodbine growing near the original town site.
