= Dave Stephenson =

American football player (1925–1975)

No. 34, 44, 69, 53
- Positions: Guard, center

Personal information
- Born: October 22, 1925; Clendenin, West Virginia, U.S.
- Died: July 19, 1975 (aged 49); Charleston, West Virginia, U.S.
- Listed height: 6 ft 2 in (1.88 m)
- Listed weight: 232 lb (105 kg)

Career information
- High school: Charleston
- College: Tennessee (1946); West Virginia (1948-1949)
- NFL draft: 1950: 15th round, 194th overall pick

Career history

Playing
- Los Angeles Rams (1950); Green Bay Packers (1951–1955)

Coaching
- Charleston Rockets (1964–1965) Assistant coach

Career NFL statistics
- Games played: 61
- Games started: 26
- Fumble recoveries: 1
- Stats at Pro Football Reference

James David Stephenson (October 22, 1925 – July 19, 1975) was a guard in the National Football League (NFL). He was selected by the Los Angeles Rams in the fifteenth round of the 1950 NFL draft and played that season with the team. The next five seasons he would play with the Green Bay Packers.
