= R. T. Price House =

Historic house in West Virginia, United States

- U.S. National Register of Historic Places
- Location within West Virginia Location within the United States
- Location: 2405 W. Third Ave., Williamson, West Virginia
- Coordinates: 37°40′36″N 82°18′5″W
- Area: 1.4 acres (0.57 ha)
- Built: 1940
- Architect: Dean, Levi J.
- Architectural style: Tudor Revival
- NRHP reference No.: 90001989
- Added to NRHP: January 10, 1991

R. T. Price House is a historic home located at Williamson, Mingo County, West Virginia. It was designed by noted West Virginia architect Levi J. Dean and built about 1940. It has a 1 1/2-story main block with one story east and west wings. It has side gable roofs, and is faced in red brick. The house exhibits design features in the Tudor Revival style.

It was listed on the National Register of Historic Places in 1991.
