= West Virginia Route 39 =

State highway in West Virginia, United States

West Virginia Route 39

Route information
- Maintained by WVDOH
- Length: 106.2 mi (170.9 km)

Major junctions
- West end: US 60 / WV 16 in Gauley Bridge
- WV 16 concurrent Gauley Bridge to Belva; US 19 at Summersville; WV 20 concurrent Nettie to Fenwick; WV 55 concurrent Fenwick to Marlinton; US 219 concurrent Mill Point to Marlinton; WV 92 concurrent near Minnehaha Springs
- East end: SR 39 near Minnehaha Springs

Location
- Country: United States
- State: West Virginia
- Counties: Fayette, Nicholas, Greenbrier, Pocahontas

Highway system
- West Virginia State Highway System; Interstate; US; State
← WV 38	→ US 40

West Virginia Route 39 (WV 39) is an east–west state highway in West Virginia. The western terminus of the route is at U.S. Route 60 and West Virginia Route 16 in Gauley Bridge. The eastern terminus is at the Virginia state line four miles (6.4 km) east of Minnehaha Springs, where WV 39 continues east into Virginia as State Route 39.

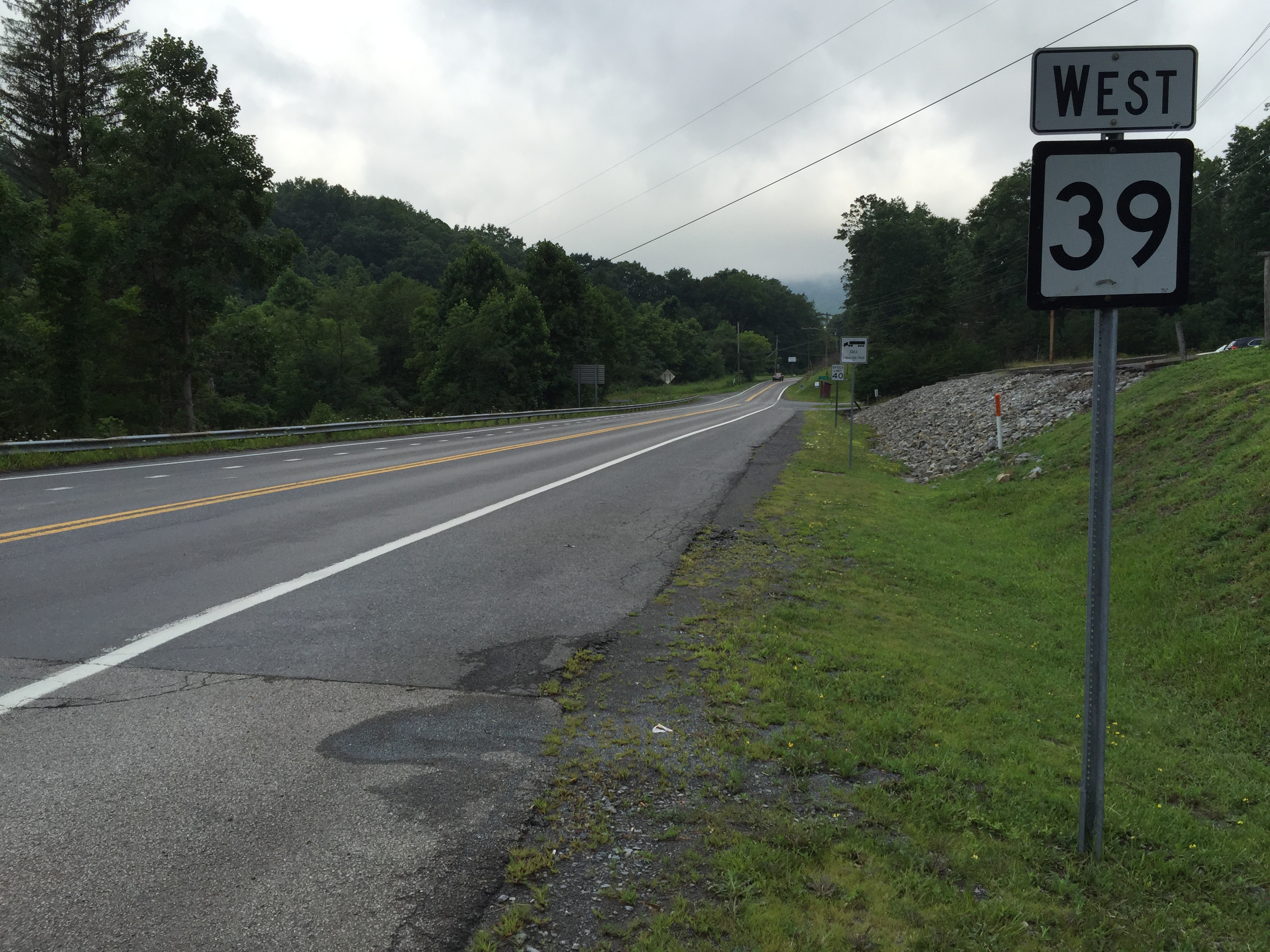
View west along WV 39 at US 19 in Summersville

== Major intersections ==
County	Location	mi	km	Destinations	Notes
Fayette	Gauley Bridge			US 60 / WV 16 south – Beckley, Lewisburg, Charleston	west end of WV 16 overlap
Fayette	Belva			WV 16 north – Clay	east end of WV 16 overlap
Nicholas	Drennen			WV 129 east – Summersville Lake	
Nicholas	Summersville			WV 41 north – Craigsville	west end of WV 41 overlap
Nicholas	Summersville			WV 41 south – Mount Nebo	east end of WV 41 overlap
Nicholas	Summersville			US 19 – Sutton, Beckley	
Nicholas	Nettie			WV 20 south – Rainelle	west end of WV 20 overlap
Nicholas	Fenwick			WV 20 north / WV 55 west – Webster Springs, Craigsville	east end of WV 20 overlap; west end of WV 55 overlap
Pocahontas				WV 150 north	
Pocahontas	Mill Point			US 219 south – Hillsboro, Lewisburg	west end of US 219 overlap
Pocahontas	Marlinton			US 219 north / WV 55 east – Elkins	east end of US 219 / WV 55 overlap
Pocahontas				WV 28 north – Green Bank	
Pocahontas	Minnehaha Springs			WV 92 north – Green Bank	west end of WV 92 overlap
Pocahontas	Rimel			WV 92 south – White Sulphur Springs	east end of WV 92 overlap
Ryder Gap				SR 39 east – Warm Springs	Virginia state line
1.000 mi = 1.609 km; 1.000 km = 0.621 mi: Concurrency terminus
