= Keslers Cross Lanes, West Virginia =

Kessler's Cross Lanes
- Unincorporated community
- Location within the state of West Virginia Kessler's Cross Lanes (the United States)
- Coordinates: 38°14′07″N 80°56′08″W
- Country: United States
- State: West Virginia
- County: Nicholas
- Time zone: UTC-5 (Eastern (EST))
  - Summer (DST): UTC-4 (EDT)
- GNIS feature ID: 1541166

Kessler's Cross Lanes (sometimes misspelled as Kesler's Cross Lanes on maps) is an unincorporated community along Route 129 in Nicholas County, West Virginia, United States. Just south of Kessler's Cross Lanes is Carnifex Ferry Battlefield State Park, which is a park of historical interest; a Civil War battle was fought at the site in 1863.

Located nearby is the Capt. John Halstead Farm, listed on the National Register of Historic Places in 1998.

== Name ==
The community was named after Frederick Kessler, an early settler.

== See also ==
- Battle of Kessler's Cross Lanes
