= John W. Shelton =

American businessman and politician

John W. Shelton (August 8, 1928 – April 1, 2014) was an American businessman and politician.

Born in Lockwood, West Virginia, Shelton was a businessman who owned Shelton Trucking Company and Mid-State Industrial Lubricates. He served in the West Virginia House of Delegates from 1996 to 2004 as a Democrat.
