= Ricketts House (Huntington, West Virginia) =

Historic house in West Virginia, United States

- U.S. National Register of Historic Places
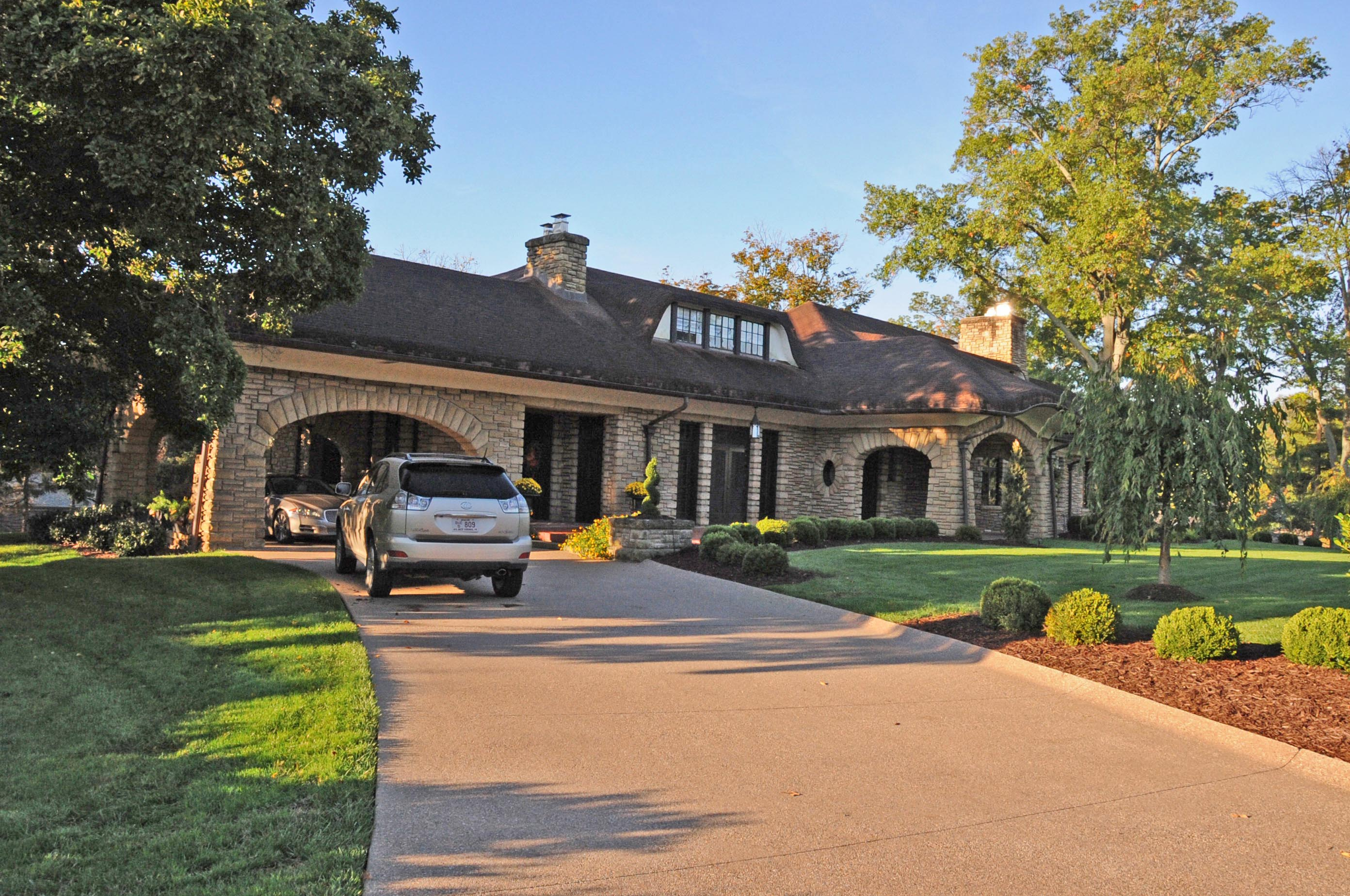

- Location within West Virginia Location within the United States
- Location: 2301 Washington Blvd., Huntington, West Virginia
- Coordinates: 38°24′21″N 82°24′44″W
- Area: less than one acre
- Built: 1924
- Architect: Dean, Levi J.
- Architectural style: Late 19th And 20th Century Revivals, Tudor Revival, Prairie School
- NRHP reference No.: 94000721
- Added to NRHP: July 15, 1994

Ricketts House, also known as the Stevens Residence, is a historic home located at Huntington, Cabell County, West Virginia. It was designed in 1924, and built in 1925. It is a large (c. 16,000 square feet) stone dwelling with a complex, low pitched hipped roof punctuated by four large stone chimneys and with large overhanging eaves. The design is reflective of the Prairie School, with Tudor manor house influences. It is a significant and well-preserved work of the prominent Huntington architect, Levi J. Dean.

It was listed on the National Register of Historic Places in 1994.

== See also ==
- National Register of Historic Places listings in Cabell County, West Virginia
