= Cranberry River (West Virginia) =

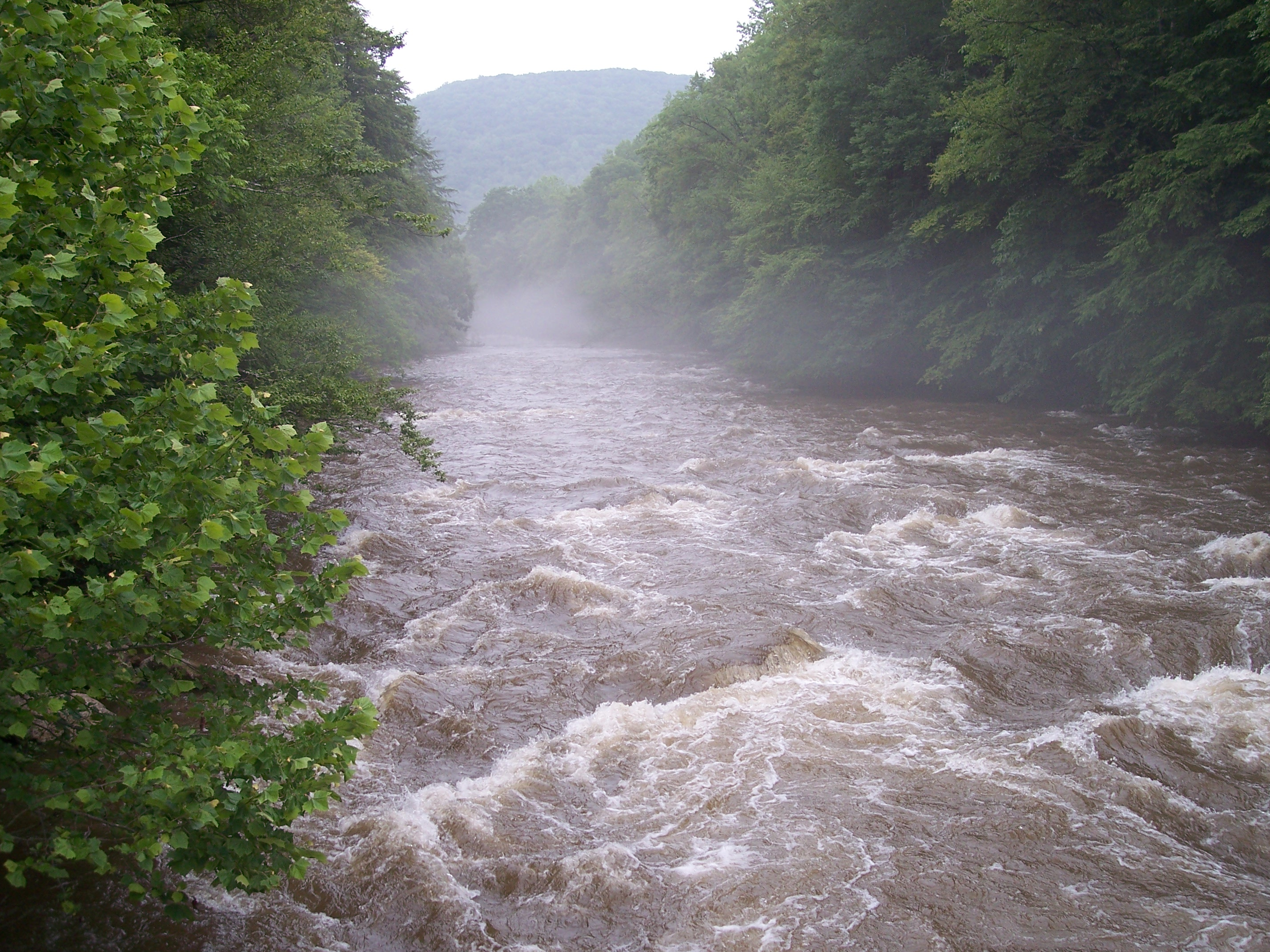
- High water near Big Rock Campground in Monongahela National Forest

Location
- Country: United States
- State: West Virginia
- Counties: Pocahontas, Webster, Nicholas

Physical characteristics
- Source: South Fork Cranberry River
  - location: Cranberry Mountain, Pocahontas County
  - coordinates: 38°12′48″N 80°13′14″W
  - elevation: 3,890 ft (1,190 m)
- 2nd source: North Fork Cranberry River
  - location: Black Mountain, Pocahontas County
  - coordinates: 38°14′03″N 80°14′32″W
  - elevation: 4,364 ft (1,330 m)
- Source confluence
  - location: Pocahontas County
  - coordinates: 38°15′28″N 80°19′27″W
  - elevation: 3,176 ft (968 m)
- Mouth: Gauley River
  - location: Woodbine
  - coordinates: 38°17′58″N 80°36′49″W
  - elevation: 1,919 ft (585 m)
- Length: 24 mi (39 km)
- Basin size: 74 mi^{2} (190 km^{2})
- Discharge
  - location: near Richwood
  - average: 233.6 cu ft/s (6.61 m^{3}/s) (USGS water years 1945-2019)
  - minimum: 126.2 cu ft/s (3.57 m^{3}/s) (water year 1999)
  - maximum: 318 cu ft/s (9.0 m^{3}/s) (water year 1979)
- Discharge
  - location: mouth
  - average: 277.08 cu ft/s (7.846 m^{3}/s) (estimate)

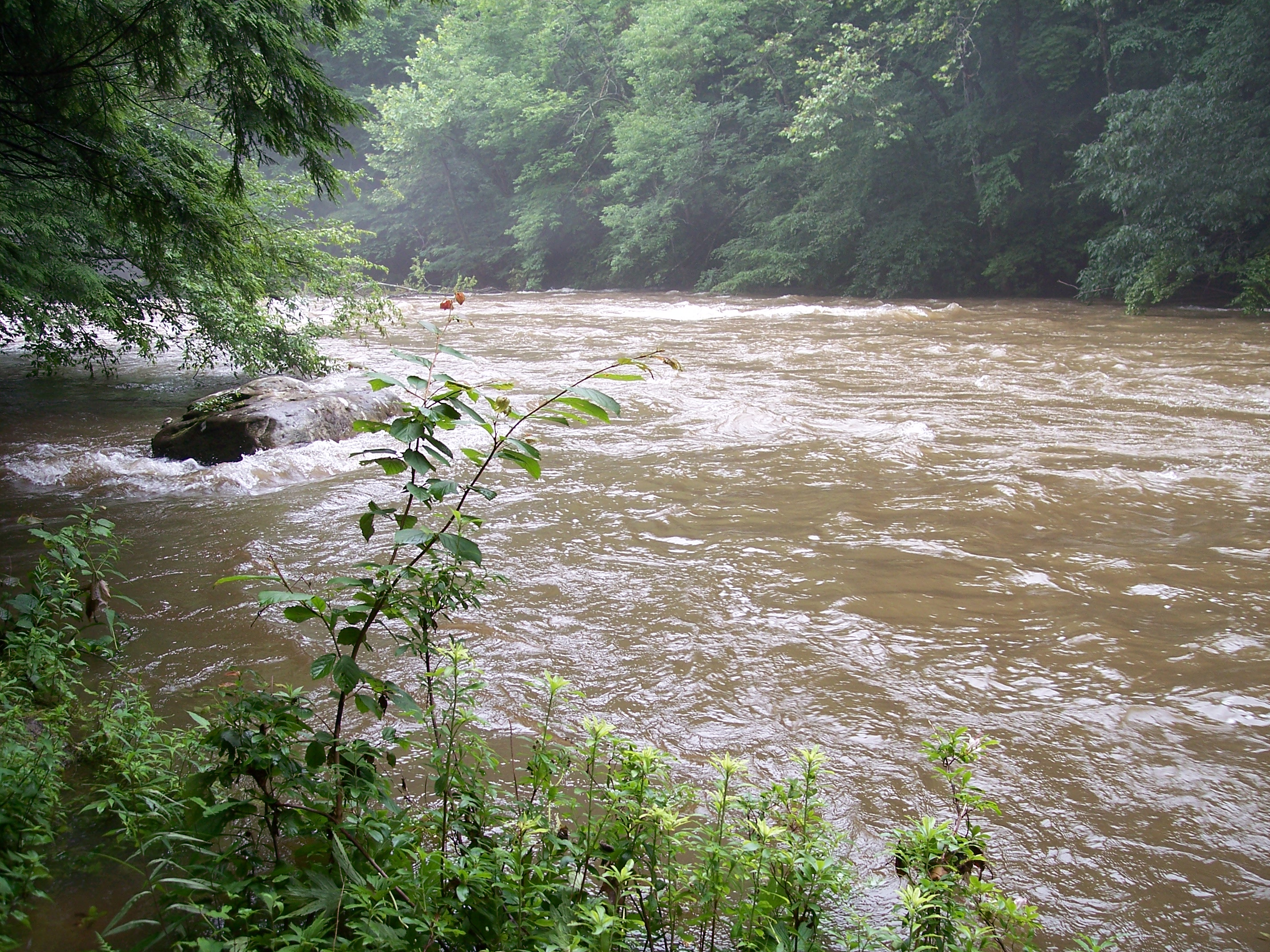
Cranberry River at the Woodbine Picnic Area after a heavy rain

The Cranberry River is a tributary of the Gauley River located in southeastern West Virginia in the United States. It is a part of the Mississippi River watershed, by way of the Gauley, Kanawha, and Ohio Rivers, draining an area of 74 square miles (192 km^{2}).

The river has also been known historically as Cranberry Creek. The river was named for cranberry bogs along its course.

== Geography ==
The Cranberry River is formed in southwestern Pocahontas County by the confluence of its North and South forks. The South Fork, the longer of the two at a length of 9 miles (14 km), rises on Cranberry Mountain just west of the Highland Scenic Highway before flowing through the Cranberry Glades Botanical Area. The North Fork rises about 2 miles (3.2 km) north on Black Mountain.

Below the confluence of its forks, the Cranberry flows for 24 miles (39 km) generally westward towards its mouth at the Gauley River near Craigsville.

The Cranberry River has several pay campgrounds, free campsites, and picnic areas along its banks.

== Fishing ==
Fish biomass production was reduced three fold and fish diversity was cut almost in half between 1957 and 1987 in the Cranberry River watershed. Although causality was never established, this was attributed to acidification from atmospheric deposition of nitric and sulfuric acid. Flow-driven liming stations were established on the Dogway Fork in 1988 and in 1993 on the North Fork just above its confluence with the South Fork of the Cranberry River. A fishable brook trout population and 13 macroinvertebrate species have been restored to the Dogway Fork since liming has begun. Smallmouth bass and rock bass have been reestablished in the treated part of the river and numbers have increased in the lower reaches.

The Cranberry River and its small tributaries are regarded as some of the finest trout streams in the eastern United States. Until recently, however, trout fishing on the south fork was limited to the lower half of the river due to acid rain. The West Virginia Division of Natural Resources has worked to counter this problem by installing a liming station on the north fork of the river.

== Flow rate ==
At its mouth, the river's estimated mean annual flow rate is 277.08 cubic feet per second (7.846 m^{3}/s). A USGS stream gauge on the creek near Richwood recorded a mean annual discharge of 233.6 cu ft/s (6.61 m^{3}/s) during water years 1945-2019. The highest annual mean discharge during the period was 318 cu ft/s (9.0 m^{3}/s) in water year 1979, and the lowest was 126.2 cu ft/s (3.57 m^{3}/s) in water year 1999. The highest daily mean discharge during that period was 6,770 cu ft/s (192 m^{3}/s) on March 21, 1984, and the lowest was 0.16 cu ft/s (0.0045 m^{3}/s) on August 21, 1987.

== See also ==
- List of West Virginia rivers
