= Lockwood, West Virginia =

Lockwood
- Unincorporated community
- Location within the state of West Virginia Lockwood (the United States)
- Coordinates: 38°15′34″N 81°2′5″W
- Country: United States
- State: West Virginia
- County: Nicholas
- Time zone: UTC-5 (Eastern (EST))
  - Summer (DST): UTC-4 (EDT)
- GNIS feature ID: 1542290

Lockwood is an unincorporated community in western Nicholas County, West Virginia, United States. The town is situated along Otter Creek and West Virginia Route 39.

== History ==
The community is named in honor of Belva Ann Lockwood, a presidential candidate and early feminist.

Lockwood post office was established in 1893.

The Lockwood Historic District was listed on the National Register of Historic Places in 1998.

== Notable person ==
- John W. Shelton, businessman and member of the West Virginia House of Delegates, was born in Lockwood.

== See also ==
- Belva, West Virginia, another community in Nicholas County named for Lockwood.
