= Clendenin, West Virginia =

- Town
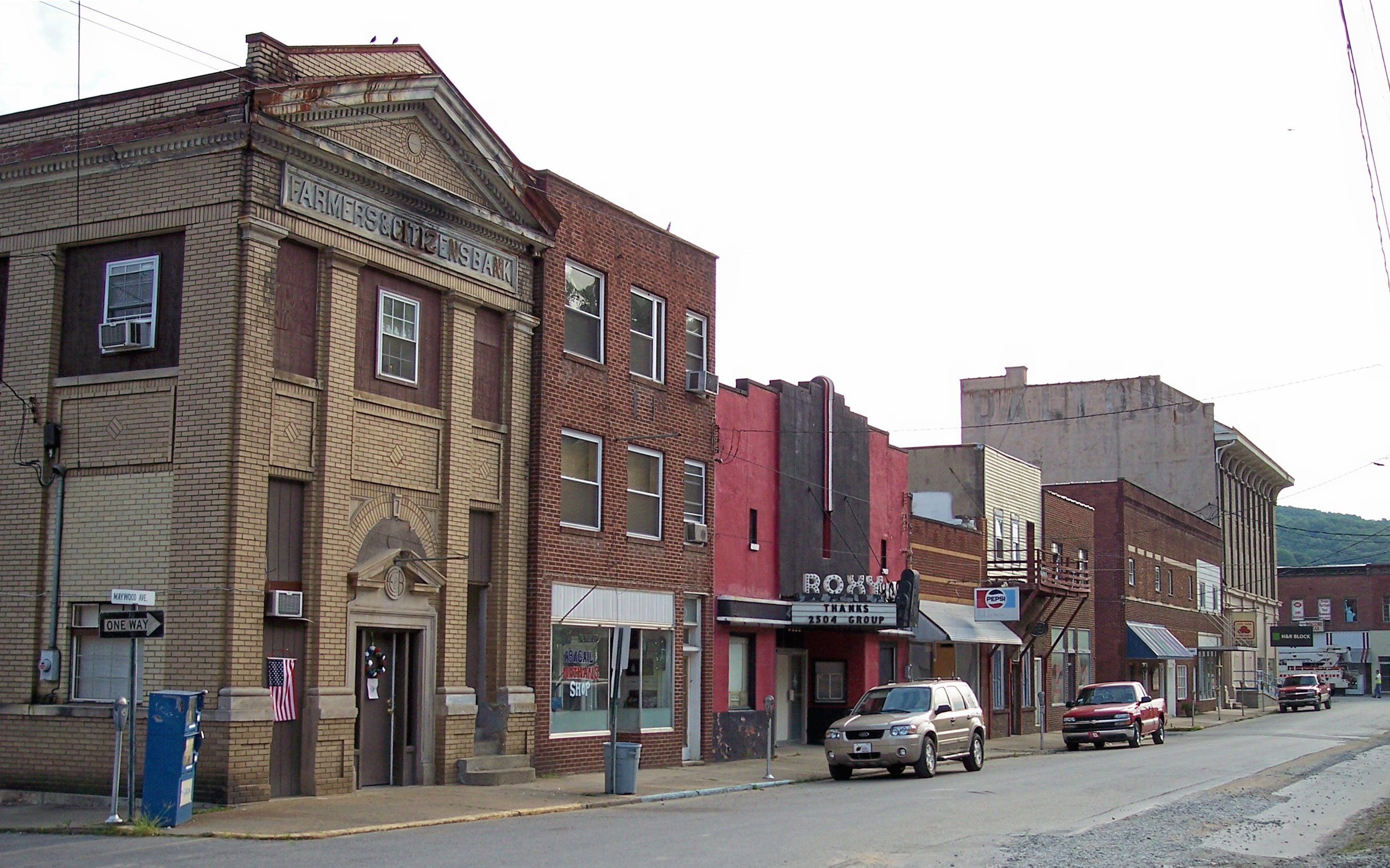
- Maywood Avenue in downtown Clendenin in 2007

- Logo

- Location of Clendenin in Kanawha County, West Virginia.
- Coordinates: 38°29′19″N 81°20′56″W
- Country: United States
- State: West Virginia
- County: Kanawha

Government
  - Type: Strong City Council
  - Mayor: Kay Summers
  - Recorder: Amanda N. Amburgey

Area
  - Total: 1.52 sq mi (3.94 km^{2})
  - Land: 1.44 sq mi (3.73 km^{2})
  - Water: 0.081 sq mi (0.21 km^{2})
- Elevation: 620 ft (190 m)

Population (2020)
  - Total: 850
  - Estimate (2021): 850
  - Density: 762.9/sq mi (294.56/km^{2})
- Time zone: UTC-5 (Eastern (EST))
  - Summer (DST): UTC-4 (EDT)
- ZIP code: 25045
- Area code: 304
- FIPS code: 54-16012
- GNIS feature ID: 1537398
- Website: Official website

Clendenin is a town in Kanawha County, West Virginia, United States, situated along the Elk River. The population was 850 at the 2020 census.

== History ==
In the 1800s, Clendenin was a small settlement at the confluence of Big Sandy Creek and the Elk River that eventually became a small village named Chilton. At this time, timber and coal mining were the principal industries in the area. In 1846, one of the first cannel coal veins was discovered at Falling Rock (only a few miles from Chilton/Clendenin) and became a rich source for manufacturing artificial gas. Clendenin was platted in 1877.

In 1893, the Coal and Coke railroad was built running through Clendenin, paralleling the Elk River and allowing the logging industry to set up residence. Along with the drilling of the first gas well in the area in 1900, this allowed the development of one of the largest oil and gas fields in West Virginia. The town was incorporated in 1904 and named after the Clendenin family, an early pioneer family in the Kanawha River Valley. The first petrochemical plant in the world was built in Clendenin in 1920. This plant was the original Union Carbide Corporation facility. Other chief economic staples included timber, coal, gas, oil, and salt. The decades from 1900 to 1930 saw most of the towns growth, and construction of most of the major buildings in town, including the elementary, middle, and high schools, several large churches, three banks, and several blocks of commercial buildings. When Union Carbide moved their production plant from Falling Rock to Charleston, the economy slowed but Clendenin remained a commercial hub for northern Kanawha County, southern Roane County, and western Clay County until Interstate 79 bypassed the town in the 1980s.

Clendenin suffered damage during the 2016 West Virginia flood. Recovery was largely complete by January 2020, although some homes remained in need of demolition or rebuilding.

The current mayor of Clendenin is Kay Summers. Town elections (including the office of mayor and city council) occur every two years. Recent efforts have been made by 25045-A New Clendenin (a non-profit corporation based in Clendenin) and the Business and Industrial Development Corporation (headquartered in Charleston) to enhance economic and cultural development in the town.

== Geography ==
According to the United States Census Bureau, the town has a total area of 1.51 square miles (3.91 km^{2}), of which 1.44 square miles (3.73 km^{2}) is land and 0.07 square miles (0.18 km^{2}) is water.

=== Climate ===
The climate in this area is characterized by hot, humid summers and generally mild to cool winters. According to the Köppen Climate Classification system, Clendenin has a humid subtropical climate, abbreviated "Cfa" on climate maps. In Clendenin, 236 days out of the year have fog, and 153 days have precipitation.

Climate data for Clendenin, West Virginia (1991–2020)
Month	Jan	Feb	Mar	Apr	May	Jun	Jul	Aug	Sep	Oct	Nov	Dec	Year
Mean daily maximum °F (°C)	42.5 (5.8)	47.1 (8.4)	56.3 (13.5)	69.1 (20.6)	75.9 (24.4)	83.5 (28.6)	86.0 (30.0)	85.1 (29.5)	79.6 (26.4)	68.7 (20.4)	56.5 (13.6)	46.4 (8.0)	66.4 (19.1)
Daily mean °F (°C)	33.1 (0.6)	36.2 (2.3)	43.8 (6.6)	54.8 (12.7)	63.1 (17.3)	71.6 (22.0)	75.3 (24.1)	74.3 (23.5)	68.1 (20.1)	56.3 (13.5)	44.9 (7.2)	37.3 (2.9)	54.9 (12.7)
Mean daily minimum °F (°C)	23.7 (−4.6)	25.2 (−3.8)	31.2 (−0.4)	40.5 (4.7)	50.3 (10.2)	59.8 (15.4)	64.6 (18.1)	63.6 (17.6)	56.6 (13.7)	44.0 (6.7)	33.3 (0.7)	28.1 (−2.2)	43.4 (6.3)
Average precipitation inches (mm)	3.88 (99)	3.40 (86)	4.45 (113)	4.32 (110)	5.17 (131)	6.08 (154)	5.84 (148)	4.81 (122)	3.88 (99)	3.06 (78)	3.65 (93)	3.98 (101)	52.52 (1,334)
Average snowfall inches (cm)	6.1 (15)	3.2 (8.1)	4.0 (10)	0.1 (0.25)	0.0 (0.0)	0.0 (0.0)	0.0 (0.0)	0.0 (0.0)	0.0 (0.0)	0.0 (0.0)	0.7 (1.8)	3.8 (9.7)	17.9 (44.85)
Source: NOAA

== Demographics ==
Historical population
Census	Pop.	Note	%±
1910	815		—
1920	1,263		55.0%
1930	1,217		−3.6%
1940	1,200		−1.4%
1950	1,475		22.9%
1960	1,510		2.4%
1970	1,438		−4.8%
1980	1,373		−4.5%
1990	1,203		−12.4%
2000	1,116		−7.2%
2010	1,227		9.9%
2020	850		−30.7%
2021 (est.)	850		0.0%
U.S. Decennial Census

The median income for a household in the town was $32,000, and the median income for a family was $38,021. Males had a median income of $30,000 versus $18,500 for females. The per capita income for the town was $16,587. About 9.7% of families and 14.6% of the population were below the poverty line, including 13.7% of those under age 18 and 20.2% of those age 65 or over.

=== 2010 census ===
As of the 2010 census, there were 1,227 people, 524 households, and 335 families residing in the town. The population density was 852.1 inhabitants per square mile (329.0/km^{2}). There were 576 housing units at an average density of 400.0 per square mile (154.4/km^{2}). The racial makeup of the town was 98.7% White, 0.2% African American, 0.3% Asian, and 0.7% from two or more races. Hispanic or Latino of any race were 0.1% of the population.

There were 524 households, of which 27.1% had children under the age of 18 living with them, 49.0% were married couples living together, 10.7% had a female householder with no husband present, 4.2% had a male householder with no wife present, and 36.1% were non-families. 31.7% of all households were made up of individuals, and 15.3% had someone living alone who was 65 years of age or older. The average household size was 2.34 and the average family size was 2.96.

The median age in the town was 43.5 years. 21.7% of residents were under the age of 18; 6.8% were between the ages of 18 and 24; 23.8% were from 25 to 44; 29% were from 45 to 64; and 18.7% were 65 years of age or older. The gender makeup of the town was 49.8% male and 50.2% female.

== Arts and culture ==
The Clendenin Historic District is listed on the National Register of Historic Places.

== Parks and recreation ==
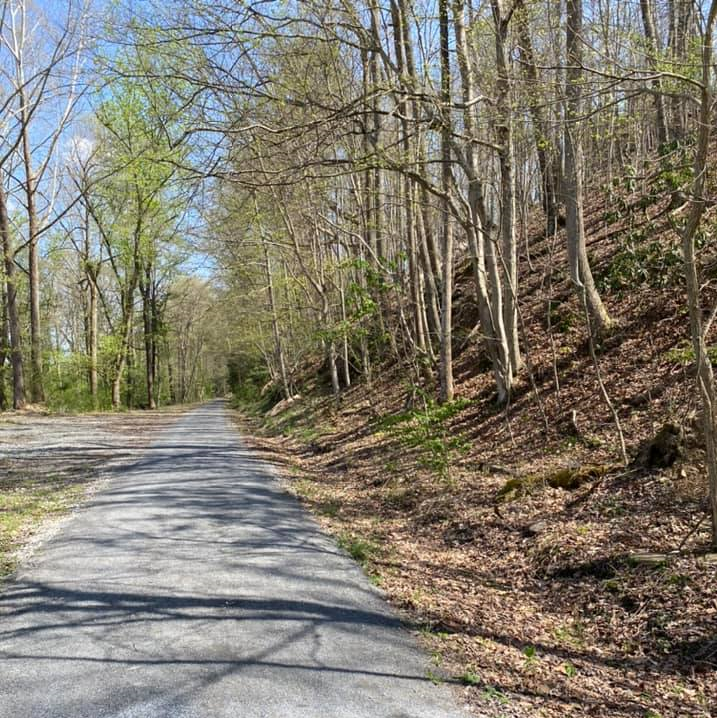
Elk River Trail Path in Clendenin

The Elk River Trail is a 75-mile (121 km) trail from Clendenin to Gassaway, West Virginia. The trail features waterfalls, fishing, canoeing, and kayaking.

== Education ==
Kindergarten through 12th grade students in Clendenin attend Clendenin Elementary School (PK-5), Elkview Middle School (6-8), and Herbert Hoover High School (West Virginia) (9-12). Only the Clendenin Elementary lies within the boundaries of the city. Elkview Middle School is located 7 miles from Clendenin in neighboring Elkview, WV. Herbert Hoover High School was located just outside of Clendenin town limits until it was destroyed in the June 2016 floods. The new Herbert Hoover High School is located on Frame Road in Elkview and has an opening date of August 2023.

== Notable people ==
- Bill Karr, played right end for the Chicago Bears from 1933 to 1938, scoring 18 TDs on a career total of only 48 receptions
- Billy Joe Mantooth, 1970 All American at Ferrum College; transferred to West Virginia University in 1971, played in the NFL for the Philadelphia Eagles and Houston Oilers
- Dave Stephenson, played in the NFL for the Los Angeles Rams and Green Bay Packers

== Mothman sighting claims ==
Various claims of seeing "a large brown winged man take flight" have been made in the area. Others described seeing "a large gray creature whose eyes 'glowed red' when the car headlights picked it up." The alleged creature became known as the Mothman.
