= Curtin, Nicholas County, West Virginia =

Unincorporated community in West Virginia, United States

Curtin
- Unincorporated community
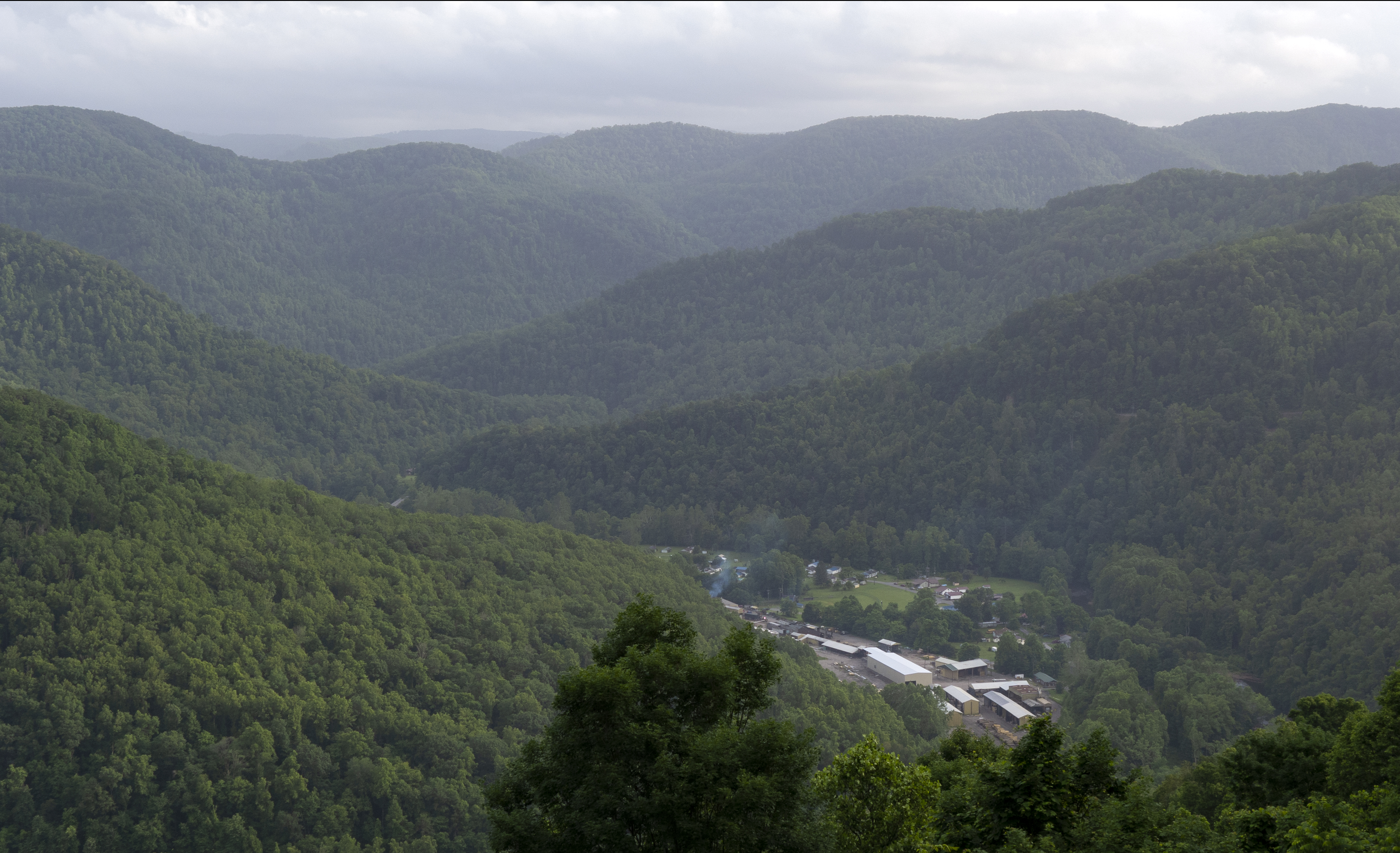
- Looking down at Curtin from a lookout

- Location within the state of West Virginia Curtin (the United States)
- Coordinates: 38°17′29″N 80°38′24″W
- Country: United States
- State: West Virginia
- County: Nicholas
- Time zone: UTC-5 (Eastern (EST))
  - Summer (DST): UTC-4 (EDT)
- GNIS feature ID: 1554244

Curtin is a nearly abandoned unincorporated community in eastern Nicholas County, West Virginia, United States. The area is situated at the bottomland surrounding the mouth of the Cherry River at its confluence with the Gauley River. Curtin is also the location where state routes 20 and 55 cross the Gauley.

== History ==
Curtin was founded by General G. W. Curtin, and most likely was named for him or his family.
