= Mason–Drennen House =

Historic house in West Virginia, United States

- U.S. National Register of Historic Places
- Location within West Virginia Location within the United States
- Location: Junction of West Virginia Routes 39 and WV 129, near Drennen, West Virginia
- Coordinates: 38.2711°N 80.9967°W
- Area: 2.5 acres (1.0 ha)
- Built: 1860
- Architectural style: Federal
- NRHP reference No.: 98001474
- Added to NRHP: December 15, 1998

Mason–Drennen House, also known as the Martin Bibb Mason House, Drennen-Mason House, and Drennen Spring, is a historic home located near Drennen, West Virginia, United States. The main portion of the house was built about 1818 and 1835, and the rear wing was added about 1910. It is a two-story, side gable with a rear gable, two-story wing of log and frame construction. It features a full-length, two-story porch on the front of the house. Also on the property are two contributing barns.

It was listed on the National Register of Historic Places in 1998.
