= Lockwood Historic District =

Historic district in West Virginia, United States

- U.S. National Register of Historic Places
- U.S. Historic district
- Location within West Virginia Location within the United States
- Location: Roughly along WV 39, Lockwood, West Virginia
- Coordinates: 38°15′27″N 81°1′42″W
- Area: 127 acres (51 ha)
- Built: 1792
- Architectural style: Colonial Revival, Stick/eastlake, Federal
- NRHP reference No.: 98001468
- Added to NRHP: December 16, 1998

Lockwood Historic District is a national historic district located at Lockwood, Nicholas County, West Virginia, United States. The district includes 26 contributing buildings and 1 contributing site. The district encompasses the community of Lockwood. All the buildings are of frame or log construction. Notable buildings include the Fairview Baptist Church (1916), Summers Residence (1990), Gay Grose House (c. 1890), and Hill House (c. 1861). Also included are the Summers Cemetery and the Morris grave site and monument.

It was listed on the National Register of Historic Places in 1998.
