= Nicholas County Courthouse =

- U.S. National Register of Historic Places
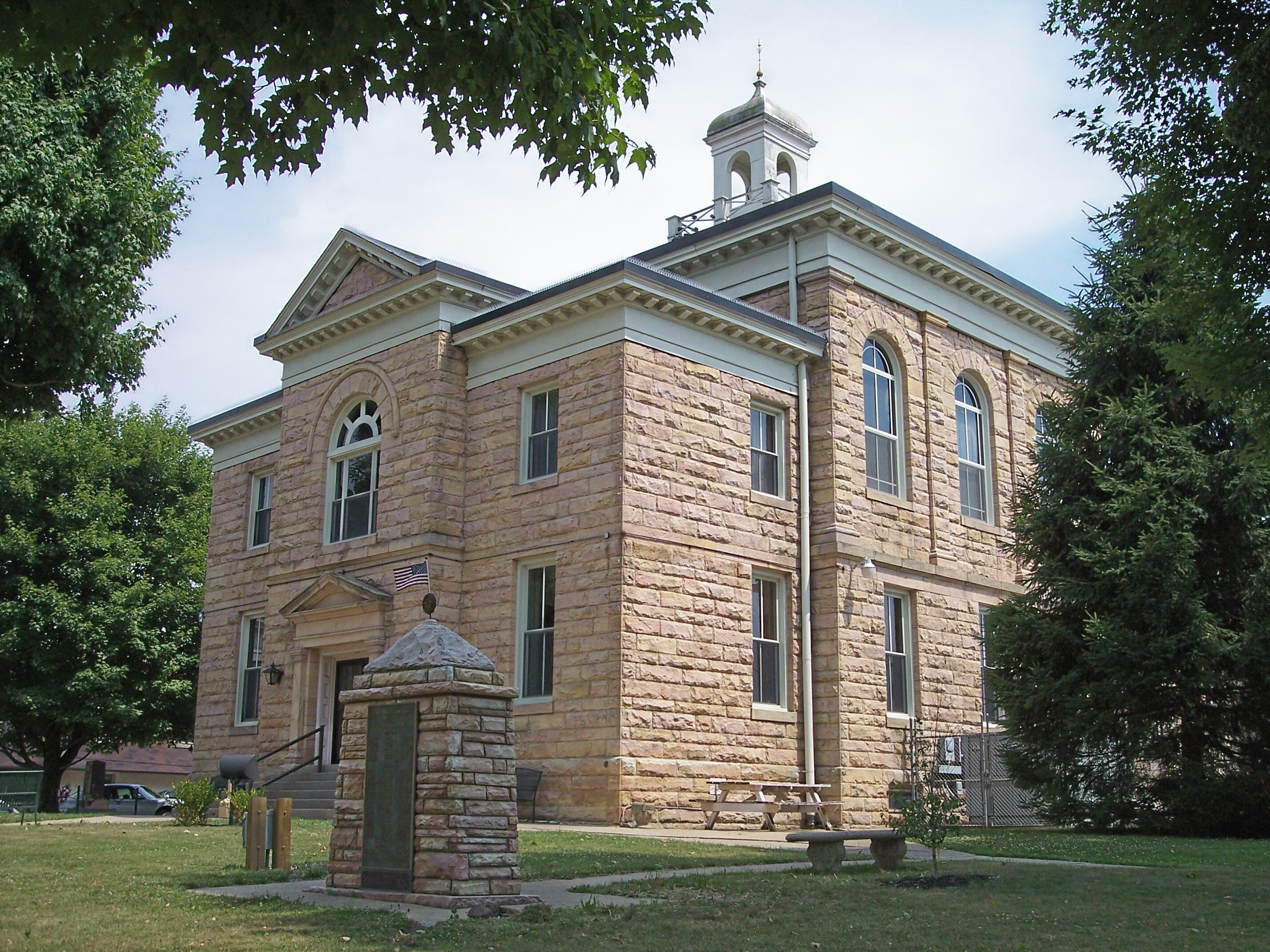
- Nicholas County Courthouse, July 2007

- Location within West Virginia Location within the United States
- Interactive map showing the location of Nicholas County Courthouse
- Location: 700 Main St., Summersville, West Virginia
- Coordinates: 38°15′45″N 80°51′5″W
- Built: 1898
- Architect: Davis, Frank E. and Henry R., Dean, Levi J.
- Architectural style: Classical Revival, Art Deco
- NRHP reference No.: 91001014
- Added to NRHP: August 16, 1991

The Nicholas County Courthouse in Summersville, West Virginia is a Neoclassical Revival building, designed in 1895 and not completed until 1898. The primary building material was locally quarried Lower Gilbert Sandstone. A jail was added in 1910. A further addition was designed by Levi J. Dean in 1940 and executed by the Works Progress Administration. The addition reflects Art Deco influences.
