= Brock Hotel (Summersville, West Virginia) =

- U.S. National Register of Historic Places
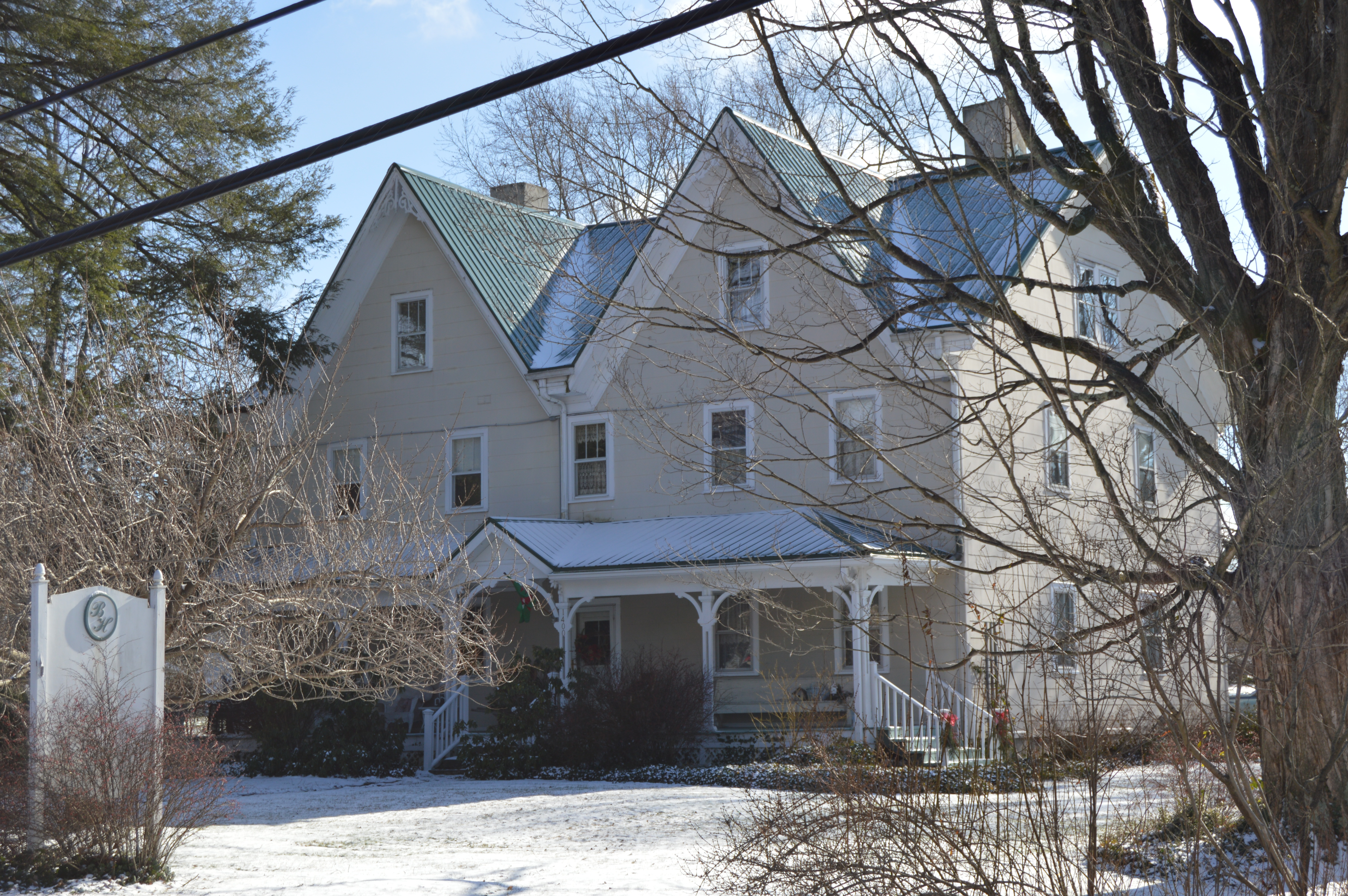
- Front and western side

- Location within West Virginia Location within the United States
- Location: 1400 Webster Rd., Summersville, West Virginia
- Coordinates: 38°17′0″N 80°50′42″W
- Area: 1 acre (0.40 ha)
- Architectural style: Queen Anne
- NRHP reference No.: 93000615
- Added to NRHP: July 9, 1993

Brock Hotel, also known as the Brock House, is a historic hotel located at Summersville, Nicholas County, West Virginia. It was built about 1890, and is a large 2½-story, frame dwelling. It features broad, shady porches and high pitched twin gables in a vernacular Queen Anne style. It measures approximately 48-foot-wide (15 m) and 40-foot-deep (12 m). It operated as a hotel until about 1914.

It was listed on the National Register of Historic Places in 1993.
