= Clendenin Historic District =

Historic district in West Virginia, United States

- U.S. National Register of Historic Places
- U.S. Historic district
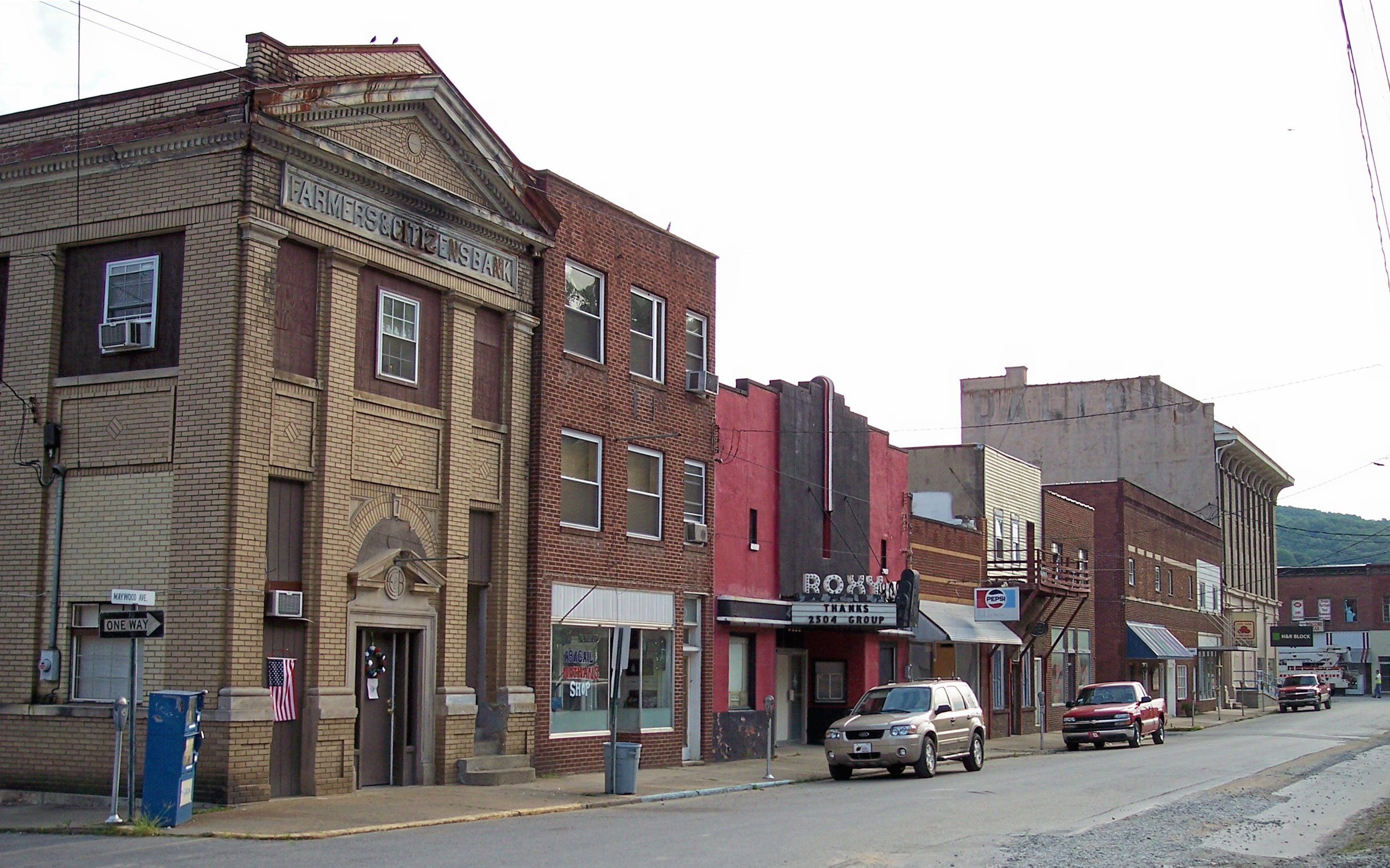
- Downtown Clendenin, July 2007

- Location within West Virginia Location within the United States
- Location: Roughly bounded by First Ave. and Kanawha Ave. between 5th St. and French St., Clendenin, West Virginia
- Coordinates: 38°29′22″N 81°20′51″W
- Built: 1920
- Architect: Dean, Levi J.; Knapp & Haviland, et al.
- Architectural style: Late Gothic Revival, Classical Revival, Colonial Revival
- NRHP reference No.: 96000442
- Added to NRHP: May 02, 1996

Clendenin Historic District is a national historic district in Clendenin, Kanawha County, West Virginia. The district includes 38 contributing structures constructed between about 1890 and 1940. Many of the major downtown buildings are of brick and feature heavy cornices, brick corbelling, and vernacular builders facades.

It was listed on the National Register of Historic Places in 1996.
