= Cherry River (West Virginia) =

River in West Virginia, United States

Coordinates: 38.2904°N 80.6404°W

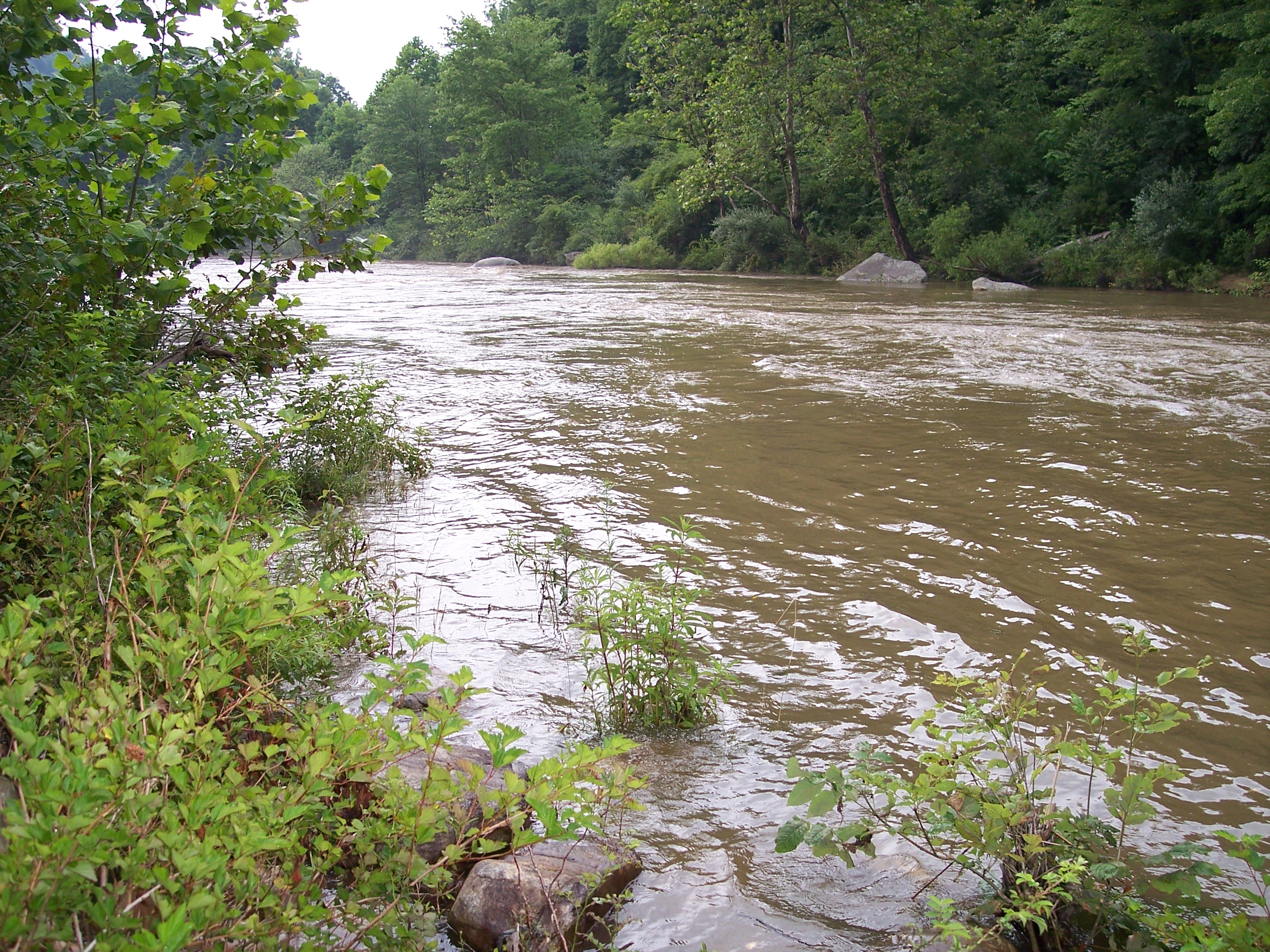
- Cherry River in Nicholas County after heavy rains

Location
- Country: United States

Physical characteristics
- Source
  - location: Pocahontas County, West Virginia (North and South Forks)
  - elevation: 2,226 ft (678 m) (at confluence of forks at Richwood)
- Mouth
  - location: Gauley River, Nicholas County, West Virginia

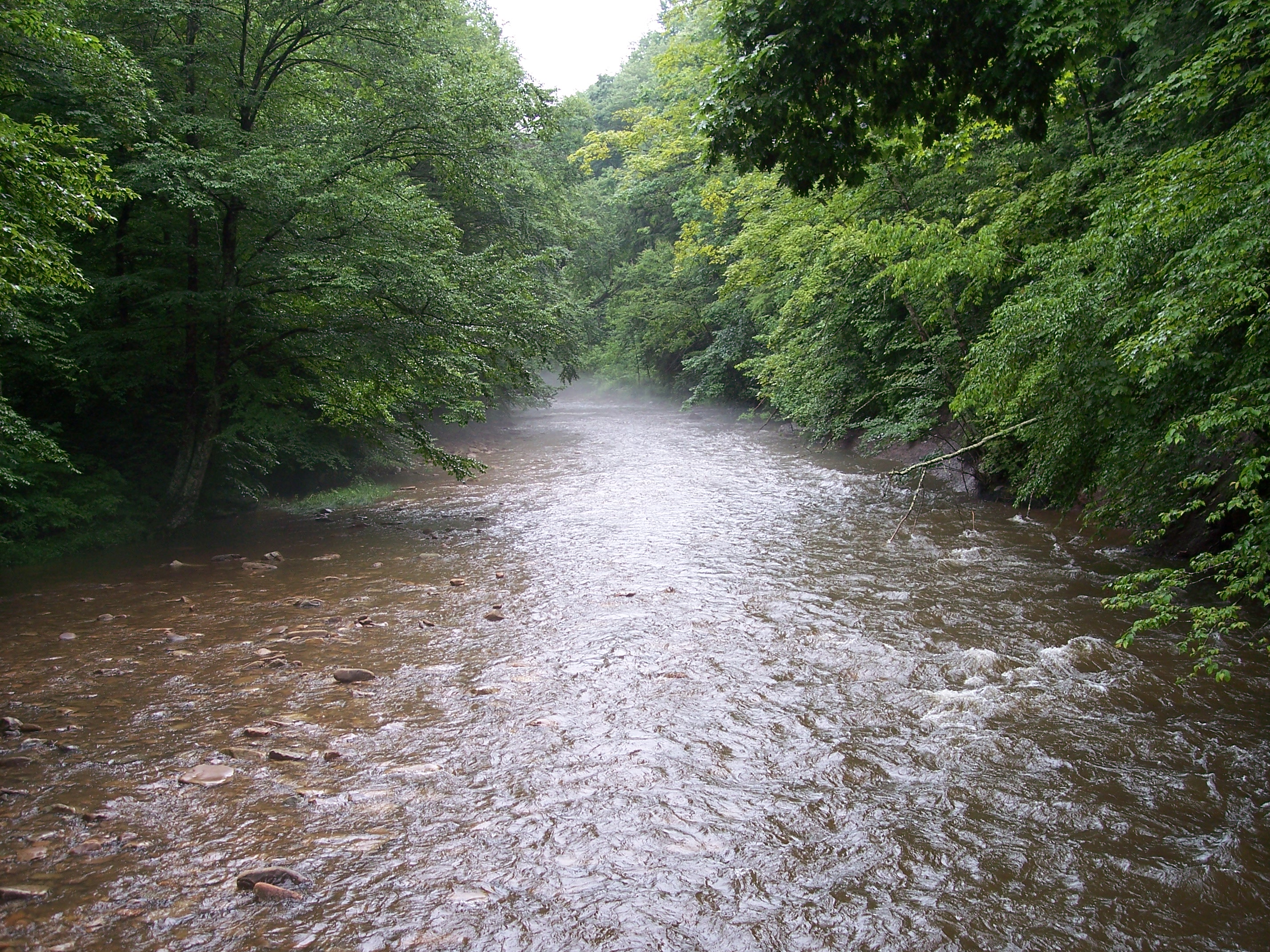
The North Fork of the Cherry River in the Monongahela National Forest in northern Greenbrier County

The Cherry River is a tributary of the Gauley River in southeastern West Virginia in the United States. Via the Gauley, Kanawha and Ohio rivers, it is part of the watershed of the Mississippi River. The Cherry River drains mostly rural and forested areas and flows for much of its length through the Monongahela National Forest. Throughout its entire length the Cherry goes over a series of whitewater rapids in a mountainous setting.

== History and geography ==
According to the Geographic Names Information System, the river has also been known historically by the toponyms Cherry Tree Waters and Cherrytree Creek in the past. The present name is for the wild cherry trees along its course.

The upper headwaters of the Cherry begin as two separate creeks, the North Fork Cherry River and the South Fork Cherry River, each of which rises in southeastern Pocahontas County and flows generally west-northwestwardly across northern Greenbrier County before converging in Nicholas County at the town of Richwood.

Now at an elevation of approximately 2,200 feet above sea level, a unique setting is created by which class 3 whitewater rapids are usually created during spring runoff through a town of about 2,000 residents, viewable from some of the city's public streets. This may be the only place in eastern North America where three categories of "twos" (population, elevation, and whitewater difficulty) are met or eclipsed. (Western US example-the Sacramento River at Dunsmuir, California)

Downstream of Richwood, the Cherry River is paralleled by a rail trail, the Cranberry Tri-Rivers Rail-Trail, then flows northwest for about 10 more miles to its confluence with the Gauley in Curtin, a nearly abandoned lumber town two miles south of Craigsville.

There are currently no dams on the Cherry and the town of Richwood has been subjected to damaging floods, most recently to a "50 year flood" during the current millennium. Local leaders have proposed a dam be placed on the South Fork just above town, thus protecting it from future flooding and potentially creating more reliable flows for whitewater recreation.

== See also ==
- List of West Virginia rivers
