= Mount Nebo, Nicholas County, West Virginia =

Mount Nebo, West Virginia
- Unincorporated community
- Location within West Virginia Location within the United States
- Coordinates: 38°12′00″N 80°51′04″W
- Country: United States
- State: West Virginia
- County: Nicholas
- Elevation: 2,070 ft (630 m)
- Time zone: UTC-5 (Eastern (EST))
  - Summer (DST): UTC-4 (EDT)
- ZIP code: 26679
- Area codes: 304 & 681
- GNIS feature ID: 1555172

Mount Nebo is an unincorporated community in Nicholas County, West Virginia, United States. Mount Nebo is located at the junction of state routes 41 and 129, 5.5 miles (8.9 km) south of Summersville. Mount Nebo has a post office with ZIP code 26679.

Mount Nebo is the home of the Summersville Lake Lighthouse, which was established on June 20, 2013. It is the only working lighthouse in the state of West Virginia. It is listed in the FAA Charts, therefore designating it as an aeronautical navigational aid. Students from neighboring counties, the Nicholas County Career & Technical School and the Fayette Institute of Technology helped build the 122 steps and the lamp room frame. The community was named after Mount Nebo, in West Asia.
