= Nicholas County Bank =

- U.S. National Register of Historic Places
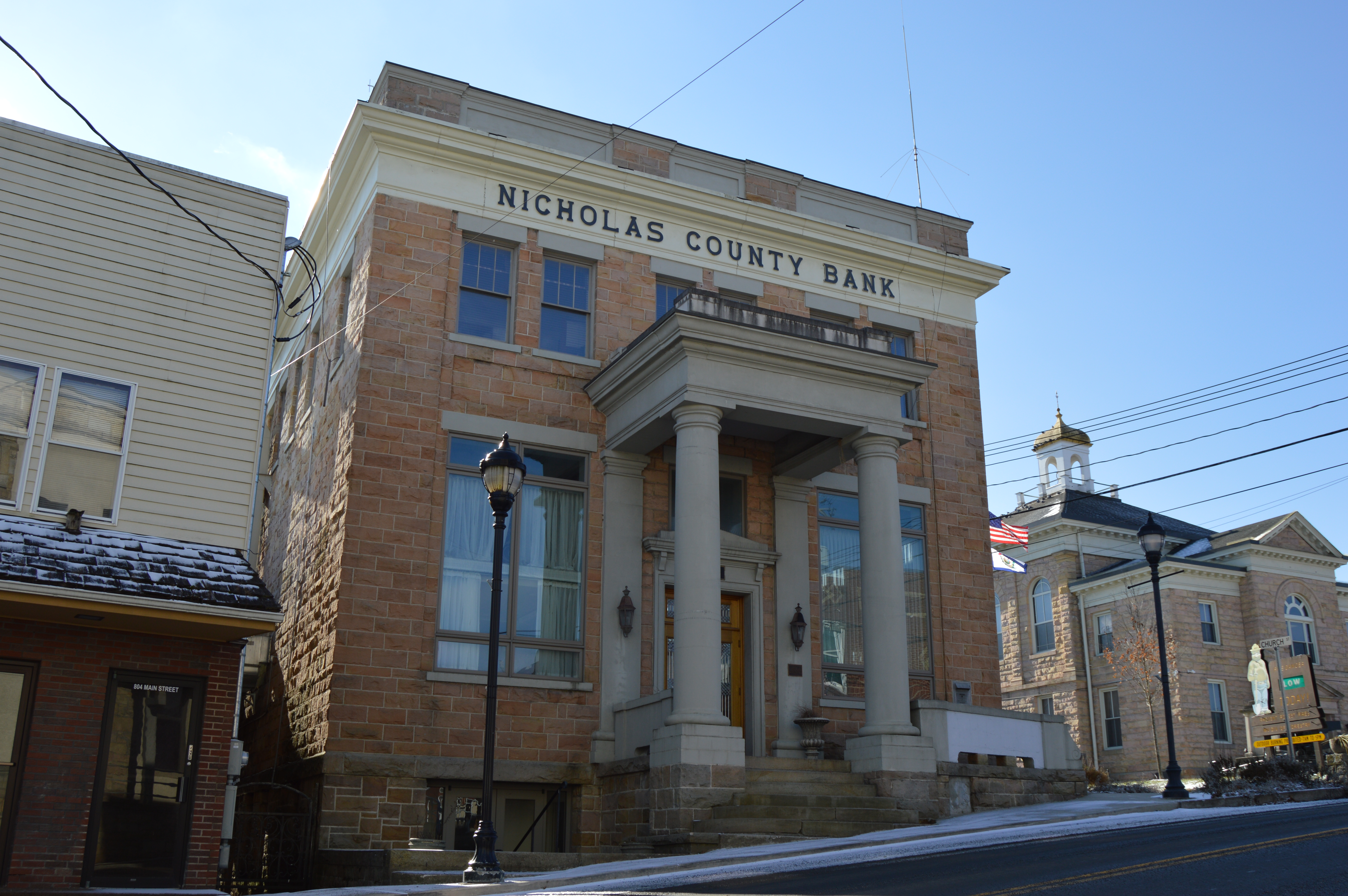
- Front and eastern side

- Location within West Virginia Location within the United States
- Location: 800 Main St., Summersville, West Virginia
- Coordinates: 38°16′51″N 80°51′3″W
- Area: 0.1 acres (0.040 ha)
- Built: 1923
- Architect: Miller, Stanley A.; Janutolo, C.G.
- Architectural style: Classical Revival
- NRHP reference No.: 00001314
- Added to NRHP: November 2, 2000

Nicholas County Bank is a historic bank building located at Summersville, Nicholas County, West Virginia. It was built in 1923, and is a two-story, locally quarried sandstone building in the Classical Revival style. It has a rectangular plan, a flat roof, and a one-story entrance portico with Doric order columns.

It was listed on the National Register of Historic Places in 2000.
