= West Virginia Route 129 =

State highway in West Virginia, United States

West Virginia Route 129

Route information
- Maintained by WVDOH
- Length: 11.9 mi (19.2 km)

Major junctions
- West end: WV 39 in Drennen
- US 19 near Mount Nebo
- East end: WV 41 / CR 13 in Mount Nebo

Location
- Country: United States
- State: West Virginia
- Counties: Nicholas

Highway system
- West Virginia State Highway System; Interstate; US; State
← WV 127	→ WV 131

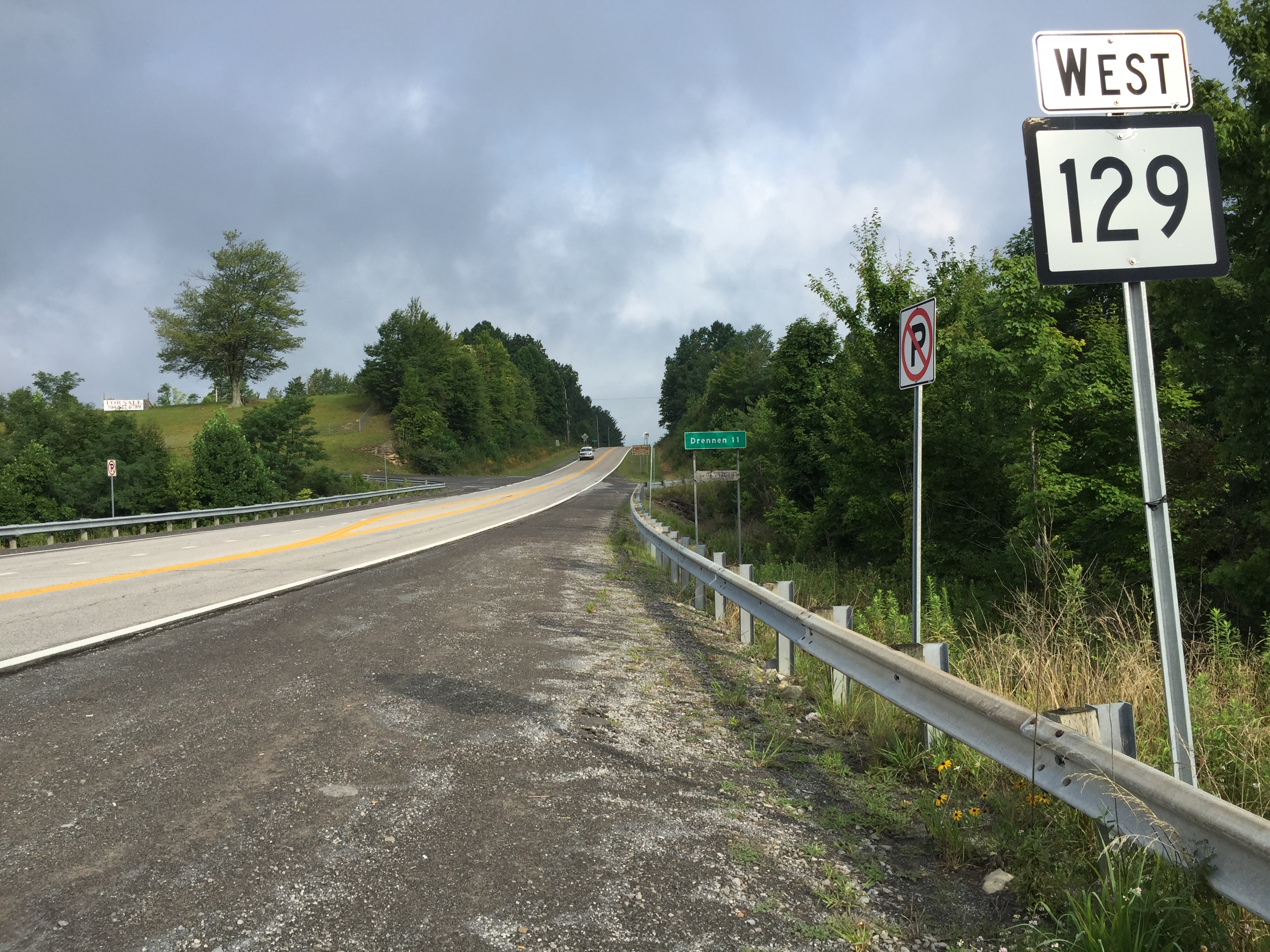
View west along WV 129 at US 19 in Mount Nebo

West Virginia Route 129 is an east–west state highway located in central West Virginia. The western terminus of the route is at West Virginia Route 39 in Drennen. The eastern terminus of the route is at West Virginia Route 41 in Mount Nebo.

== Major intersections ==
The entire route is in Nicholas County.

Location	mi	km	Destinations	Notes
Drennen			WV 39 – Gauley Bridge, Summersville	
			US 19 – Summersville, Beckley	
Mount Nebo			WV 41 / CR 13 (Old Nicholas Road) – Summersville, Nallen	
1.000 mi = 1.609 km; 1.000 km = 0.621 mi
