= Belva, West Virginia =

Unincorporated community in West Virginia, United States

Belva
- Census-designated place
- Location within the state of West Virginia Belva (the United States)
- Coordinates: 38°13′50″N 81°11′37″W
- Country: United States
- State: West Virginia
- Counties: Nicholas and Fayette

Area
  - Total: 0.162 sq mi (0.42 km^{2})
  - Land: 0.137 sq mi (0.35 km^{2})
  - Water: 0.025 sq mi (0.065 km^{2})

Population (2020)
  - Total: 78
  - Density: 570/sq mi (220/km^{2})
- Time zone: UTC-5 (Eastern (EST))
  - Summer (DST): UTC-4 (EDT)
- GNIS feature ID: 1535619

Belva is an unincorporated community and census-designated place in west Nicholas County and north Fayette County, West Virginia, United States; while the CDP only includes the Nicholas County portion, the Fayette County portion is considered part of the community. The town is situated at the bottomland surrounding the convergence of Bells Creek with Twentymile Creek and, subsequently, Twenty Mile Creek with the Gauley River. Belva is also the location of the convergence of two state highways: West Virginia Route 16 and West Virginia Route 39. At the 2020 census, the population was 78, down from 95 at the 2010 census.

== History ==
The community is named in honor of Belva Ann Lockwood, a presidential candidate and early feminist.

The Belva post office was established in 1885.

== Climate ==
The climate in this area is characterized by hot, humid summers and generally mild to cool winters. According to the Köppen Climate Classification system, Belva has a humid subtropical climate, abbreviated "Cfa" on climate maps.

== See also ==
- Lockwood, West Virginia, another community in Nicholas County named for Lockwood.
