= Beaver Mill (Craigsville, West Virginia) =

- U.S. National Register of Historic Places
- Location within West Virginia Location within the United States
- Location: West Webster Rd., near Craigsville, West Virginia
- Coordinates: 38°19′44″N 80°39′55″W
- Area: 0.2 acres (0.081 ha)
- Built: 1852
- NRHP reference No.: 01000776
- Added to NRHP: July 25, 2001

Beaver Mill is a historic grist mill located near Craigsville, Nicholas County, West Virginia. It was built in 1852, and is a two-story, clapboard-sided, timber-frame structure with an end gable roof. It sits on a stone pier foundation, and measures 25 feet wide and 30 feet, one inch deep. The mill ceased operation in 1932.

It was listed on the National Register of Historic Places in 2001.
