= Minnehaha Springs, West Virginia =

Minnehaha Springs
- Unincorporated community
- Location within the state of West Virginia Minnehaha Springs (the United States)
- Coordinates: 38°9′47″N 79°58′51″W
- Country: United States
- State: West Virginia
- County: Pocahontas
- Time zone: UTC-5 (Eastern (EST))
  - Summer (DST): UTC-4 (EDT)
- ZIP codes: 24960
- GNIS feature ID: 1552164

Minnehaha Springs is an unincorporated community located in Pocahontas County, West Virginia, United States. It was named for the fictional Native American "princess," Minnehaha, and the mineral springs on the Lockridge farm. It is the only community with this name in the United States. On the site of what is now Camp Twin Creeks warm mineral springs can still be found.

== History ==
=== Early history ===
Reportedly residents found Indian relics near the mineral springs in the region, which is why it was named Minnehaha, after a Native American maiden. Thermal springs were often sacred places for Native Americans, and they believed in the healing powers of the water. Most major thermal springs in the United States have some kind of record of use by local Native American tribes. Springs were neutral ground where tribes could rest after a battle.

The Lockridge family found the Minnehaha springs on their farmland, and they tested the water first in 1891 and then again in 1910. The results revealed that the water had similar chemical characteristics to the water of the Hot Springs in Bath County, Virginia and of Bethesda Spring in Waukesha, Wisconsin. The Lockridge family created the Pocahontas Mineral Water Development Company and began selling bottled mineral water. The water was advertised as “pure” with “medicinal virtue,” and the advertisement promised that “the most delicate stomach can retain it.” The spring's waters were used to aid with eczema, diabetes, and all forms of Bright's disease. The spring water was found to be abundant with silica and calcium carbonate.

=== The Railroad ===
In 1900 a new railroad station in Marlinton, due to the completion of the Chesapeake and Ohio Railway's Greenbrier Division, placed Minnehaha Springs in a more accessible position for travelers and tourists. In order to attract tourists, spring resorts and tourist resorts in general, had to be easy-to-get-to. In the nineteenth century, spring proprietors were involved in transportation improvements within their surrounding area. They lobbied for the development of railroads, turnpikes, river networks, and canals. Sometimes spring proprietors would work directly with railroad companies in order to establish rail stations within close distance of their resorts. The importance these transportation networks were for business is reflected in the increased presence of spring visitors in the late 1870s and 1880s when rail travel was becoming easier and more frequent.

=== Turn-of-the-century Tourism ===
==== Minnehaha Springs Hotel ====
By 1914, the Lockridge family built a hotel overlooking the spring, as well as a bath house and an indoor pool. The Lockridge family hired Casa Ybel, the proprietors of a winter resort in Sanibel, Florida to manage the resort. The spring was said to flow a million gallons in a day with a temperature of seventy-two degrees Fahrenheit. The spring's water was contained in a concrete pool and guided to a modern bathhouse. The spring had been inaccessible to the public, but with the new railway and roads in place, visitors could arrive at the hotel within thirty-five minutes. An automobile service from Marlinton could take guests to the hotel from the rail station. Minnehaha Springs could now “take its place among the sisterhood of summer resorts which has made the two Virginias famous.”

A resident physician was on the property daily, and a separate building was provided for those who needed the curative properties of the water. The combination of the “drinking cure” and the “bathing cure” assured guests that their illness or condition was no match for the Minnehaha waters.

The Minnehaha Springs hotel probably attracted a middle-class clientele. It was small in size but had modern conveniences such as its own electric water plant, modern plumbing, hot and cold running water and call bells in each room. It was two stories with twenty-four bedrooms. A tennis course, golf course, pool table, cards, music, dancing, and picnic spots were included on the resort grounds. A swimming pool and a bathhouse flowed with Minnehaha water. Livery teams, riding horses, and automobiles were also available for guests. Telephone communication with Marlinton and the delivery of telegrams and parcels allowed visitors to connect with the outside world.

The Minnehaha Springs hotel was not very successful and was transformed into a summer camp for boys in 1944. The hotel building burned down in 1945. In 2001, the summer camp was purchased by Gordon Josey and his wife, became co-ed, and is now named Twin Creeks. Previously, the summer camp had been named Camp Minnehaha, and had been operating from as early as the 1930s. The Minnehaha Springs hotel was the very first “facility in Pocahontas County built and operated strictly for the tourist business."

==== The Allegheny Sportsmen's Association ====
The Allegheny Sportsmen's Association in Minnehaha Springs, West Virginia was organized in 1912 by J. A. Viquesnay, the State Warden, and H. M. Lockridge. Their charter set their purpose not "of exterminating the fast vanishing wild life of West Virginia, but, on the contrary, with the primary intention of demonstrating the possibilities of propagating and increasing all species of song and insectivorous birds, game birds, animals and fish, and assisting in protecting the forests from fire, and thus restoring the attractive wild life and the picturesque forests of West Virginia to their original beauty and grandeur."

In their advertising pamphlet issued soon after its creation, the Allegheny Sportsmen's Association explained that “a great majority of the members of this association are not sportsmen from the standpoint of killing game, but are sportsmen from the standpoint of helping to perpetuate some of the wild life of West Virginia for future generations.” As this statement and the association's name suggests, an emphasis of the club was to unite sportsmen.

===== Elk from Yellowstone =====
On January 9 and February 6, 1913, carloads of elk from Yellowstone National Park were transported to the Allegheny Sportsmen's Association in Minnehaha Springs. A total of 67 elk were safely housed in Minnehaha Springs. The elk were confined in an enclosure until they were acclimated to their surroundings, at which time they were released on the property of the Allegheny Sportsmen's Association. West Virginia's State Warden J. A. Viquesnay, one of the founders of the Allegheny Sportsmen's Association, organized the transfer.

In fact, these elk from Yellowstone were not the first elk the Sportsmen's Association transported to their grounds. Prior to the federal transfer, 15 elk, 14 females and 1 male, had been shipped to Minnehaha Springs from Iowa, in order to analyze their adaptation to the environment. When it appeared they were thriving and produced eight calves, the Association was deemed fit to receive the Yellowstone elk. By 1932, the elk transported from Yellowstone had disappeared.

===== The Club House =====
The Allegheny Sportsmen's Association built a luxurious club house in 1913, and it opened on July 1, 1914 to accommodate the association's members and their families. The club house was four stories, fifty by sixty feet, and was equipped with modern conveniences. It contained a kitchen, dining room, and pool rooms in the basement along with two wood-burning fireplaces. The first floor housed a large club room with four wood-burning fireplaces to keep the room warm. The second and third floors were divided into bedrooms and described as being “nicely finished and furnished.” On the fourth floor was a large room used to accommodate visitors when the other rooms were crowded. Both the first and second floors had large porches filled with easy chairs, swings, and hammocks, and on the roof was a small garden used as an observatory with a sweeping view of the surrounding landscape.

The club house was lit with an acetylene plant, and shower and bathtubs were supplied with hot and cold water. The water was pumped from a mineral spring in Minnehaha Springs, the location of the Minnehaha Springs hotel. Because the spring was at a higher elevation, there was good water pressure on all floors of the building. The one-hundred-acre park surrounding the club house was home to the herd of elk, deer, and other animals. Behind the clubhouse was a white pine grove where guests could lounge in camp chairs, swings, and hammocks beneath the trees. Bungalows were built by members further out in the woods in order to avoid long trips back to the hotel at night. In the surrounding grounds were two tennis courts, a golf course, a shooting trap, and a small garage for automobiles. Dog kennels were also on the property to house any canines used for hunting.

The club house cost around $15,000 and was operated on “the plan of a first-class hotel with accommodations of one hundred and fifty.” Once the association built its club house, the Allegheny Club continued to acquire recognition. Visitors traveled from various parts of the state such as Marlinton, Cass, Wheeling, Philippi, Charleston, and Lewisburg. Guests also traveled from Richmond, New York, Baltimore, Columbus, Cleveland, and Philadelphia.

The club held dinners and dances frequently, attracting large crowds. According to one article, fried chicken and waffle suppers were becoming quite famous at the club. Often dances continued until after twelve o’clock, and punch, ice cream, and cake was served in the dining room late into the night. Automobile parties made frequent trips to the Allegheny Club. Membership increased rapidly in its early years, and some weekends the club was filled to capacity, requiring visitors to go to the adjacent hotel for sleeping accommodations.

Interest in the Allegheny Club waned by the 1920s, and the National Forest received a large portion of their acreage. In 1926, Harry R. Wyllie of Huntington, owner of the H. R. Wyllie China Company, acquired the lodge to use as a private estate. In 1946, Wyllie sold the property to the Standard Ultramarine Company, and in 1964 the lodge was shut down due to the sale of Standard Ultramarine. On October 17, 1983, the Allegheny Club burned to the ground.
