= Downtown Richwood Historic District =

Historic district in West Virginia, United States

- U.S. National Register of Historic Places
- U.S. Historic district
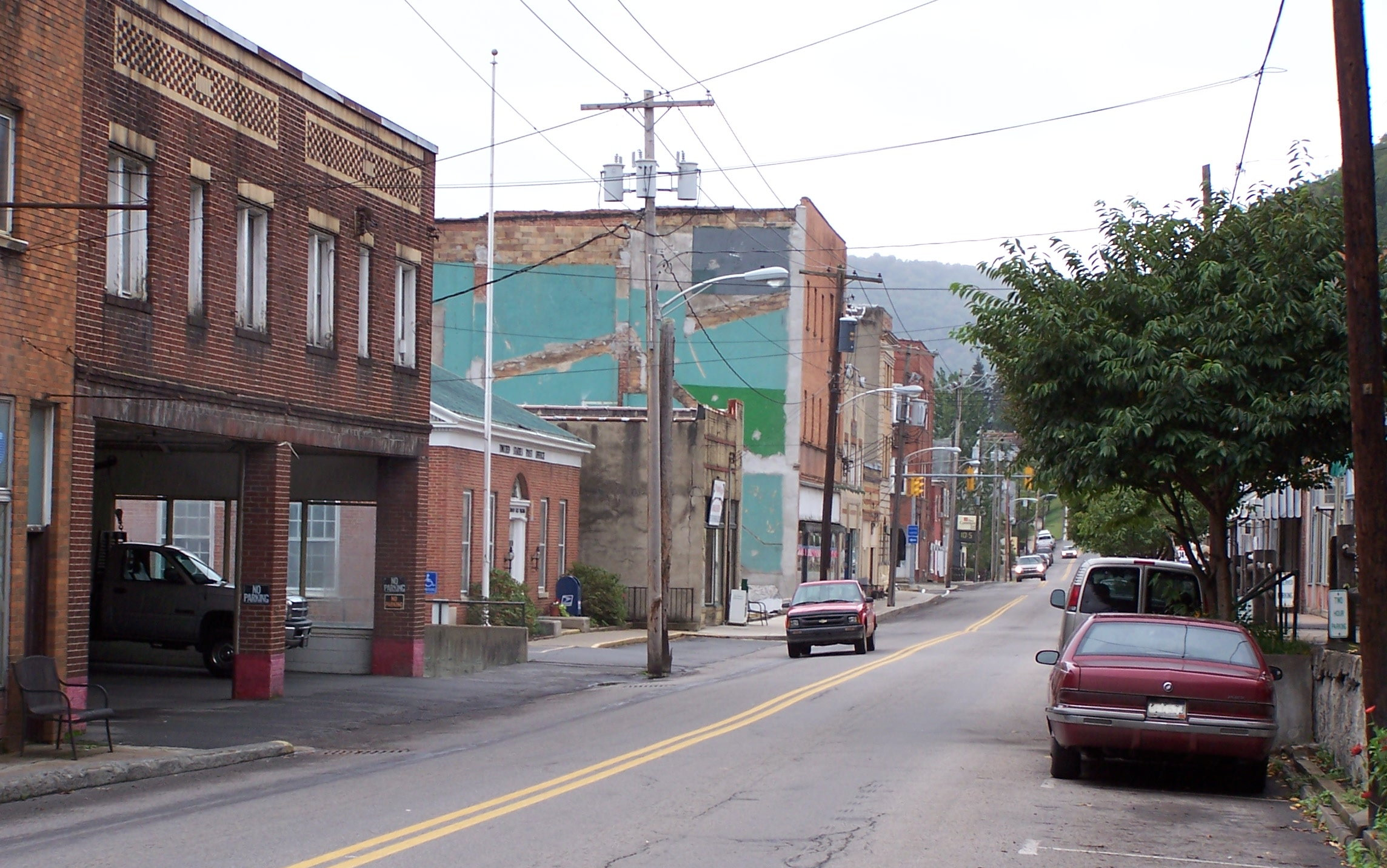
- Downtown Richwood Historic District, September 2006

- Location within West Virginia Location within the United States
- Location: Roughly including portions of Main St. Oakford Ave. and Commercial St., Richwood, West Virginia
- Coordinates: 38°13′28″N 80°32′3″W
- Area: 10 acres (4.0 ha)
- Built: 1900
- Architect: Dean, Levi J.; Tincher, J.A.
- Architectural style: Italianate, Romanesque, et al.
- NRHP reference No.: 01000778
- Added to NRHP: July 25, 2001

Downtown Richwood Historic District is a national historic district located at Richwood, Nicholas County, West Virginia. The district includes 51 contributing buildings in the central business district of Richwood. They consist of mostly two and three-story masonry commercial buildings from the late 19th and early 20th century. They have storefronts on the first floor and house on the upper floors. Notable buildings include the U.S. Post Office (1936), First Methodist Church (1922) designed by Levi J. Dean, Richwood Banking and Trust Building (1902), and New Star Theatre, also by Levi J. Dean.

It was listed on the National Register of Historic Places in 2001.
