= Nettie, West Virginia =

Nettie
- Census-designated place (CDP)
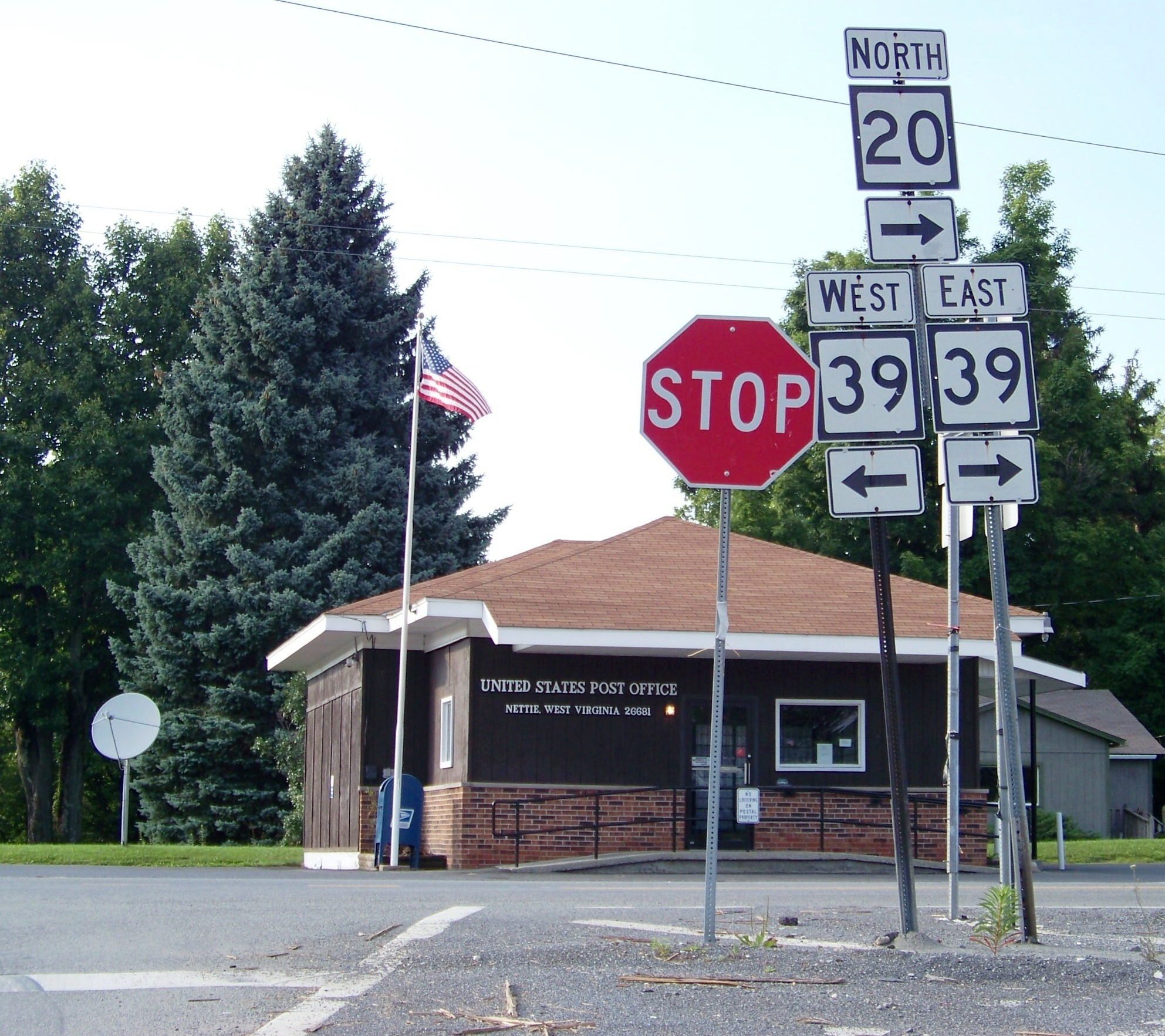
- Post office building in Nettie

- Location within the state of West Virginia
- Coordinates: 38°13′27″N 80°41′9″W
- Country: United States
- State: West Virginia
- County: Nicholas

Area
  - Total: 3.154 sq mi (8.17 km^{2})
  - Land: 3.152 sq mi (8.16 km^{2})
  - Water: 0.002 sq mi (0.0052 km^{2})

Population (2010)
  - Total: 568
  - Density: 180/sq mi (69.6/km^{2})
- Time zone: UTC-5 (Eastern (EST))
  - Summer (DST): UTC-4 (EDT)

Nettie is a census-designated place (CDP) in Nicholas County, West Virginia, United States. Nettie is the location of the southern convergence of state routes 20 and 39. As of the 2020 census, its population was 494.
