= Capt. John Halstead Farm =

Historic house in West Virginia, United States

- U.S. National Register of Historic Places
- Location within West Virginia Location within the United States
- Location: Whitewater Rd. (County Route 9), near Kesslers Cross Lanes, West Virginia
- Coordinates: 38.2446°N 80.9392°W
- Area: 3.6 acres (1.5 ha)
- Built: 1876
- NRHP reference No.: 98001475
- Added to NRHP: December 15, 1998

Capt. John Halstead Farm is a historic home and farm located near Kesslers Cross Lanes, Nicholas County, West Virginia. It was built about 1876, and is a two-story side gable with a rear gable two-story wing. It features a full-length, two-story porch on the front of the house and one on the side of the wing in the rear. Also on the property are a contributing gable-roofed tool shed, a small barn, a long narrow chicken coop, an outhouse, and a large barn. It is an example of the local type of residence and subsistence farm.

It was listed on the National Register of Historic Places in 1998.
