= Richwood, West Virginia =

- City
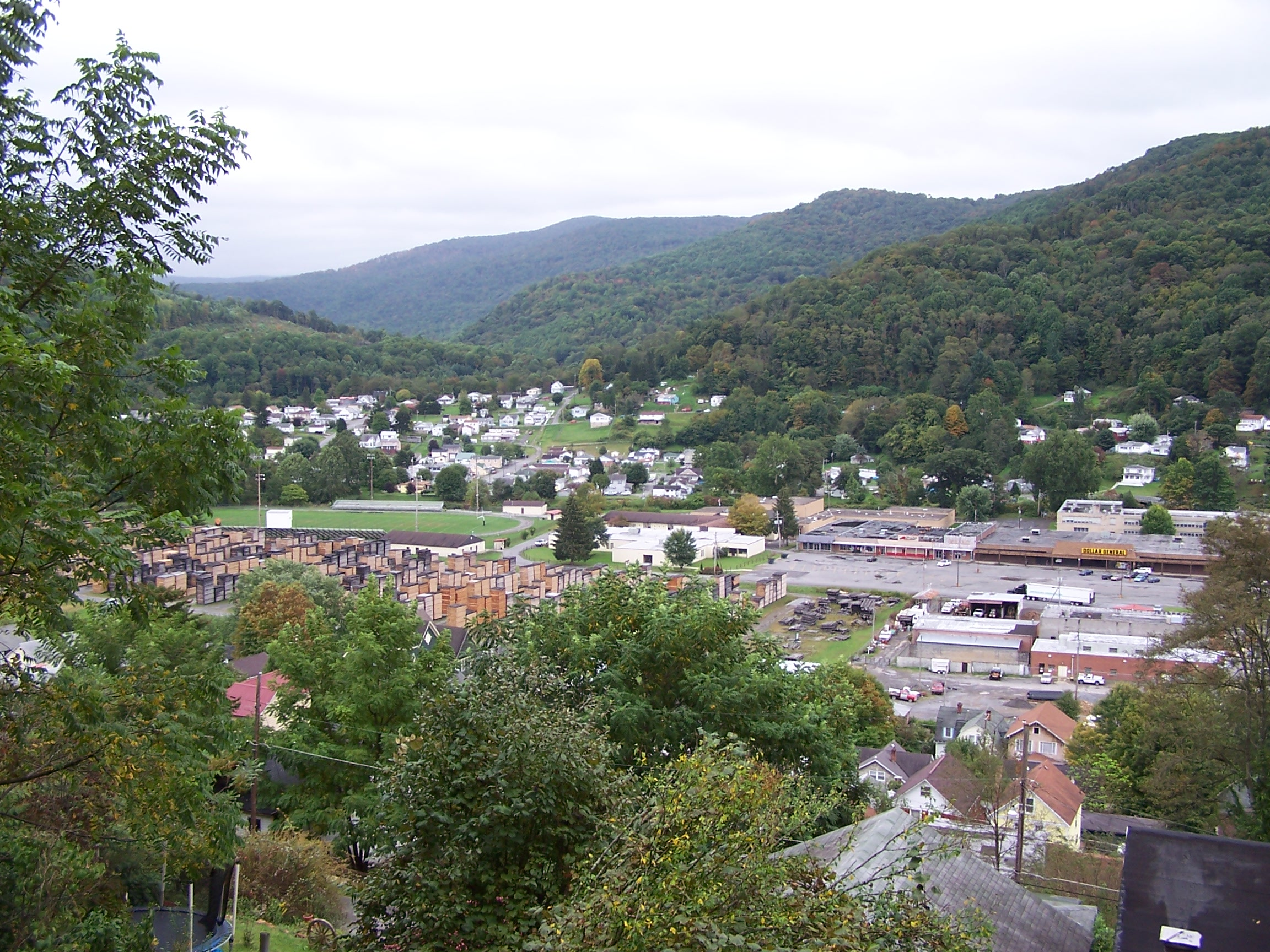

- Flag Seal Logo
- Nicknames: "The Ramp Capital of the World," "The Gateway to the Monongahela National Forest"
- Motto: The City Merry on the Banks of the Cherry
- Location of Richwood in Nicholas County, West Virginia.
- Coordinates: 38°13′25″N 80°32′12″W
- Country: United States
- State: West Virginia
- County: Nicholas
- Established: 1901

Government
  - Mayor: Gary Johnson

Area
  - Total: 1.67 sq mi (4.32 km^{2})
  - Land: 1.61 sq mi (4.17 km^{2})
  - Water: 0.058 sq mi (0.15 km^{2}) 3.59%
- Elevation: 2,205 ft (672 m)

Population (2020)
  - Total: 1,660
  - Estimate (2021): 1,637
  - Density: 1,152.4/sq mi (444.95/km^{2})
- Time zone: UTC-5 (EST)
  - Summer (DST): UTC-4 (EDT)
- ZIP code: 26261
- Area codes: 304, 681
- FIPS code: 54-68116
- GNIS feature ID: 1555475
- Website: cityofrichwoodwv.com

Richwood is a city in Nicholas County, West Virginia, United States. In 2020, the census showed Richwood with a population of 1,661. During the 19th and early 20th century Richwood was a booming coal and lumber town. Richwood has a very rich history, including the formation of the Cherry River Navy civic organization to draw attention to issues important to the community. Richwood has also become known statewide as the "Ramp Capital of the World". Each year, in April, the city hosts a large festival that draws visitors from around the country.

== History ==
The area surrounding the forks of the Cherry River has been populated since the late 1700s. During the 19th century, the area was a sparsely settled semi-wilderness of homesteads and subsistence farms. This changed in 1898 when a railroad was extended into the area, then known as Cherry Tree Bottoms. In 1901, the town was incorporated with its present name referencing the abundant hardwood forests in the area. Soon, the area possessed a large sawmill and the world's largest clothespin factory. A labor dispute at the clothespin factory led to a 1944 U.S. Supreme Court case, Wallace Corp. v. NLRB.

The town was once home to several large businesses and industries. In addition to the sawmill and the clothespin factory, there were other factories that produced wood-based products such as axe-handles and paper. Coal also came into the industry picture during Richwood's boom-era during pre-Depression years. Banking was a white-collar industry that succeeded in the city with the large companies investing into the city's financial corporations. Once the large factories closed or relocated, many of the people followed. The final hit was when the coal industry took a downward turn and most of the local coal mines ceased operation.

Richwood now seeks to be reborn as both an artisan community and a technology center. The Downtown Richwood Historic District was listed on the National Register of Historic Places in 2001.

Richwood is the headquarters of the Cherry River Navy community organization. It was founded by John Teets, A.B. Campbell, and Lee Reese to promote the construction of a since-built missing link in West Virginia Route 39 between Richwood and Marlinton.

On June 23, 2016, a historically severe flood impacted portions of West Virginia. Richwood was among the towns most heavily affected. Flood damage resulted in significant damage to area infrastructure and condemnation of the Richwood High School and Richwood Middle School buildings.

In 2021 former Richwood mayor Bob Henry Baber was sentenced to 1–10 years in jail and to pay restitution for defrauding the city after the major flood in 2016. He had pressured a city clerk to write him out a check for volunteer work done after the flood.

== Geography ==
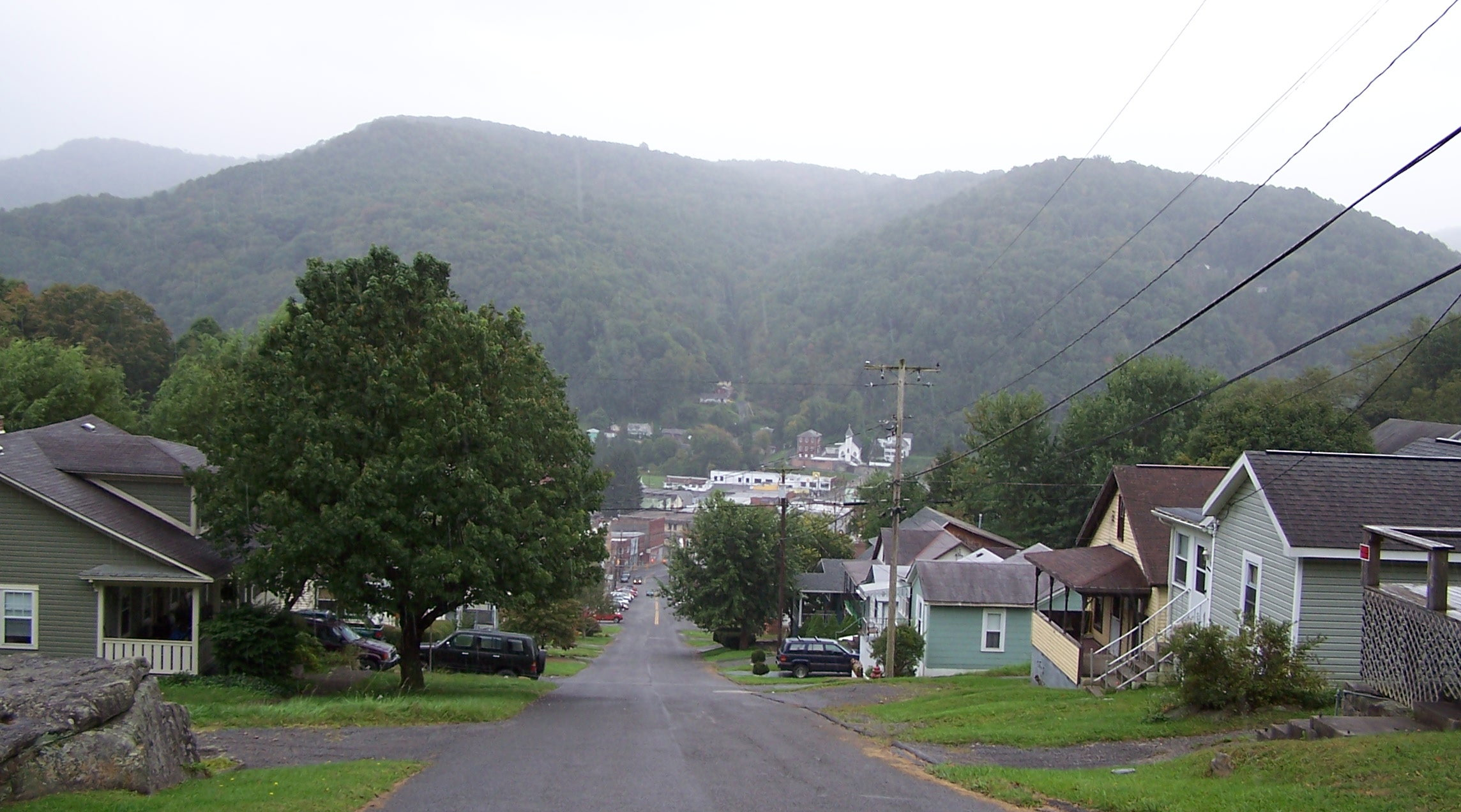
Richwood is situated in a valley located in the Appalachian Mountains.

Richwood is located at 38°13′25″N 80°32′12″W (38.223637, -80.536676). The Cherry River is formed at Richwood by the confluence of its north and south forks. Some of the city is relatively flat bottom land located along the river valley while neighborhoods are located on steep adjoining hillsides.

According to the United States Census Bureau, the city has a total area of 1.67 square miles (4.33 km^{2}), of which 1.61 square miles (4.17 km^{2}) is land and 0.06 square miles (0.16 km^{2}) is water.

=== Climate ===
The climate in this area has mild differences between highs and lows, and there is adequate rainfall year-round. According to the Köppen Climate Classification system, Richwood has a marine west coast climate, abbreviated "Cfb" on climate maps.

Climate data for Richwood 1SSE, West Virginia, 1991–2020 normals, 1985-2020 extremes: 3090ft (942m)
Month	Jan	Feb	Mar	Apr	May	Jun	Jul	Aug	Sep	Oct	Nov	Dec	Year
Record high °F (°C)	67 (19)	71 (22)	80 (27)	84 (29)	87 (31)	89 (32)	94 (34)	93 (34)	90 (32)	84 (29)	81 (27)	74 (23)	94 (34)
Mean maximum °F (°C)	60.6 (15.9)	62.0 (16.7)	69.8 (21.0)	78.9 (26.1)	80.9 (27.2)	83.3 (28.5)	84.2 (29.0)	84.6 (29.2)	82.5 (28.1)	77.0 (25.0)	70.1 (21.2)	61.8 (16.6)	86.2 (30.1)
Mean daily maximum °F (°C)	37.6 (3.1)	40.6 (4.8)	48.4 (9.1)	60.1 (15.6)	68.4 (20.2)	74.2 (23.4)	77.7 (25.4)	76.7 (24.8)	72.1 (22.3)	62.6 (17.0)	51.2 (10.7)	42.0 (5.6)	59.3 (15.2)
Daily mean °F (°C)	28.7 (−1.8)	31.1 (−0.5)	38.8 (3.8)	49.6 (9.8)	58.3 (14.6)	65.0 (18.3)	68.7 (20.4)	67.7 (19.8)	62.5 (16.9)	52.6 (11.4)	42.0 (5.6)	33.6 (0.9)	49.9 (9.9)
Mean daily minimum °F (°C)	19.9 (−6.7)	21.7 (−5.7)	29.1 (−1.6)	39.2 (4.0)	48.2 (9.0)	55.7 (13.2)	59.8 (15.4)	58.8 (14.9)	52.9 (11.6)	42.7 (5.9)	32.7 (0.4)	25.1 (−3.8)	40.5 (4.7)
Mean minimum °F (°C)	−0.9 (−18.3)	2.2 (−16.6)	10.2 (−12.1)	21.3 (−5.9)	33.4 (0.8)	43.5 (6.4)	49.7 (9.8)	49.5 (9.7)	37.8 (3.2)	26.7 (−2.9)	15.2 (−9.3)	5.5 (−14.7)	−4.7 (−20.4)
Record low °F (°C)	−24 (−31)	−12 (−24)	−3 (−19)	13 (−11)	25 (−4)	34 (1)	38 (3)	35 (2)	29 (−2)	19 (−7)	3 (−16)	−16 (−27)	−24 (−31)
Average precipitation inches (mm)	4.32 (110)	3.95 (100)	5.29 (134)	4.77 (121)	5.83 (148)	5.16 (131)	5.99 (152)	4.38 (111)	4.17 (106)	3.57 (91)	3.87 (98)	4.54 (115)	55.84 (1,417)
Average snowfall inches (cm)	26.10 (66.3)	21.90 (55.6)	16.00 (40.6)	5.30 (13.5)	0.00 (0.00)	0.00 (0.00)	0.00 (0.00)	0.00 (0.00)	0.00 (0.00)	1.10 (2.8)	7.50 (19.1)	22.10 (56.1)	100 (254)
Source 1: NOAA
Source 2: XMACIS (temp records & monthly max/mins)

== Demographics ==
Historical population
Census	Pop.	Note	%±
1910	3,061		—
1920	4,331		41.5%
1930	5,720		32.1%
1940	5,051		−11.7%
1950	5,321		5.3%
1960	4,110		−22.8%
1970	3,717		−9.6%
1980	3,568		−4.0%
1990	2,808		−21.3%
2000	2,477		−11.8%
2010	2,051		−17.2%
2020	1,660		−19.1%
2021 (est.)	1,637		−1.4%
U.S. Decennial Census

=== 2020 census ===
As of the 2020 census, Richwood had a population of 1,660. The median age was 49.5 years. 18.2% of residents were under the age of 18 and 27.2% of residents were 65 years of age or older. For every 100 females there were 95.1 males, and for every 100 females age 18 and over there were 94.8 males age 18 and over.

0.0% of residents lived in urban areas, while 100.0% lived in rural areas.

There were 783 households in Richwood, of which 22.3% had children under the age of 18 living in them. Of all households, 35.0% were married-couple households, 22.6% were households with a male householder and no spouse or partner present, and 33.8% were households with a female householder and no spouse or partner present. About 39.2% of all households were made up of individuals and 19.7% had someone living alone who was 65 years of age or older.

There were 1,055 housing units, of which 25.8% were vacant. The homeowner vacancy rate was 3.8% and the rental vacancy rate was 15.6%.

Racial composition as of the 2020 census
Race	Number	Percent
White	1,598	96.3%
Black or African American	8	0.5%
American Indian and Alaska Native	1	0.1%
Asian	4	0.2%
Native Hawaiian and Other Pacific Islander	0	0.0%
Some other race	1	0.1%
Two or more races	48	2.9%
Hispanic or Latino (of any race)	4	0.2%

=== 2010 census ===
As of the census of 2010, there were 2,051 people, 889 households, and 543 families living in the city. The population density was 1,273.9 inhabitants per square mile (491.9/km^{2}). There were 1,163 housing units at an average density of 722.4 per square mile (278.9/km^{2}). The racial makeup of the city was 97.1% White, 0.2% African American, 0.4% Native American, and 2.2% from two or more races. Hispanic or Latino people of any race were 0.7% of the population.

There were 889 households, of which 24.6% had children under the age of 18 living with them, 40.0% were married couples living together, 15.2% had a female householder with no husband present, 5.8% had a male householder with no wife present, and 38.9% were non-families. 35.2% of all households were made up of individuals, and 17.3% had someone living alone who was 65 years of age or older. The average household size was 2.21 and the average family size was 2.78.

The median age in the city was 49 years. 18.9% of residents were under the age of 18; 7.7% were between the ages of 18 and 24; 18.7% were from 25 to 44; 29.9% were from 45 to 64; and 24.7% were 65 years of age or older. The gender makeup of the city was 47.2% male and 52.8% female.

=== 2000 census ===
As of the census of 2000, there were 2,477 people, 1,030 households, and 674 families living in the city. The population density was 1,464.1 persons per square mile (565.9/km^{2}). There were 1,233 housing units at an average density of 728.8 houses per square mile (281.7/km^{2}). The racial makeup of the city was 98.83% White, 0.16% African American, 0.24% Native American, 0.36% Asian, and 0.40% from two or more races. Hispanic or Latino people of any race were 0.40% of the population.

There were 1,030 households, out of which 24.5% had children under the age of 18 living with them, 48.0% were married couples living together, 13.7% had a female householder with no husband present, and 34.5% were non-families. 32.1% of all households were made up of individuals, and 17.2% had someone living alone who was 65 years of age or older. The average household size was 2.29 and the average family size was 2.85.

In the city, the population was spread out, with 21.0% under the age of 18, 7.1% from 18 to 24, 22.4% from 25 to 44, 26.0% from 45 to 64, and 23.5% who were 65 years of age or older. The median age was 45 years. For every 100 females, there were 83.6 males. For every 100 females age 18 and over, there were 79.6 males.

The median income for a household in the city was $21,620, and the median income for a family was $28,287. Males had a median income of $25,948 versus $18,533 for females. The per capita income for the city was $12,213. About 23.3% of families and 29.2% of the population were below the poverty line, including 43.4% of those under age 18 and 14.1% of those age 65 or over.

== Economy ==
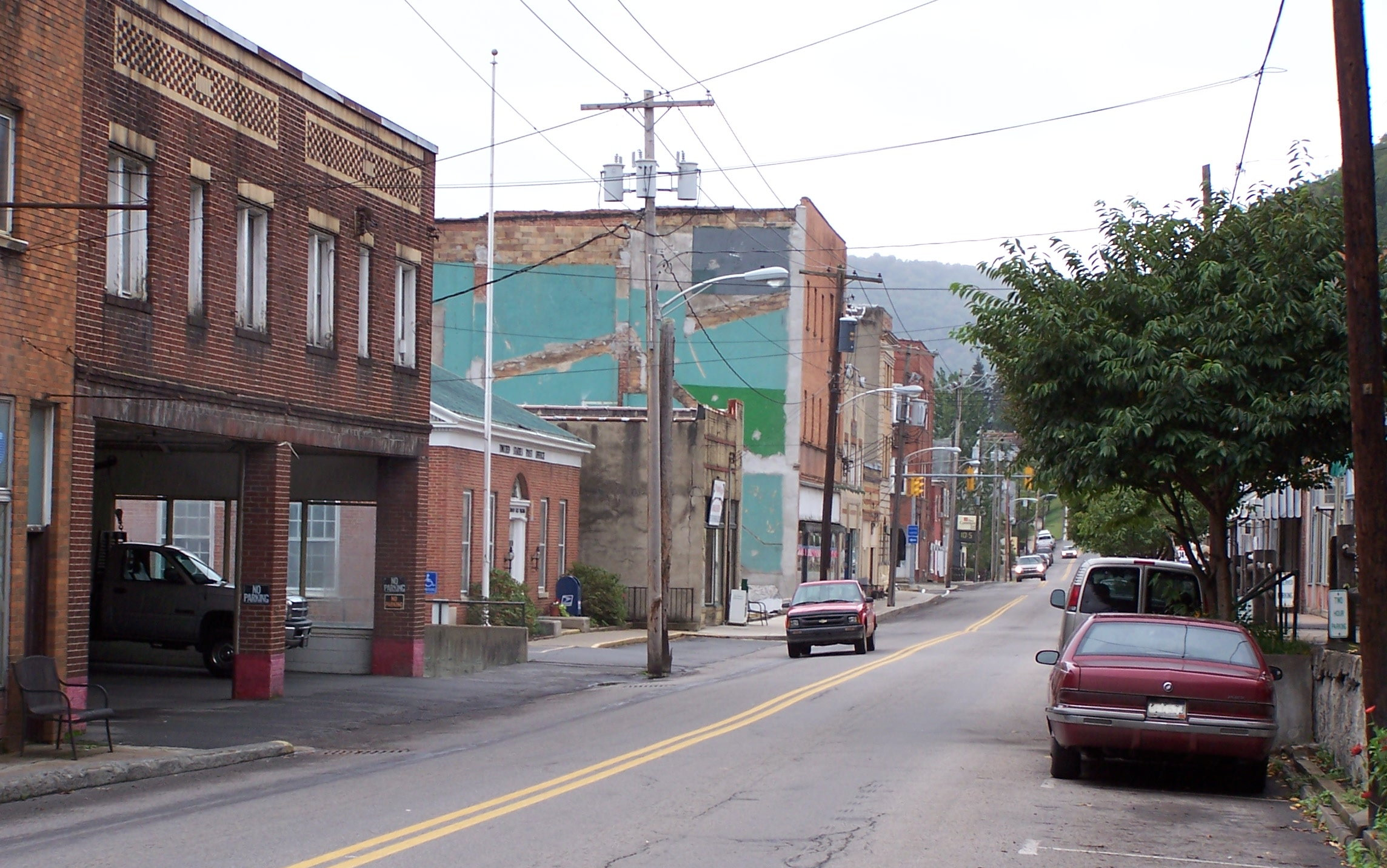
Richwood's Main Street Central Business District went from boom to bust during the 20th century, but has subsequently seen the return of specialty shops and an effort to beautify the cityscape

While Richwood was the economic center for Nicholas County for most of the 20th century, the county seat of Summersville has come to be the primary retail and business center during the past 25 years. This is mostly due to the improvement of U.S. Route 19 to a four-lane highway and the development of business along the corridor. Richwood, however, is still by default the political and economic center of eastern Nicholas County, as it is the only incorporated city in the immediate area. The city has a small shopping plaza which houses Dollar General.

There have been efforts to attract visitors to the area for the natural environment of the adjacent Monongahela National Forest. The mayor welcomed attendees of the 2005 Rainbow Gathering that was held in the forest and took the opportunity to encourage craftspeople to buy property and set up businesses there.

Richwood operates the small Richwood Municipal Airport, which is located in the nearby unincorporated community of New Hope.

Richwood has suffered from economic decline and a local drug culture.

== Local places of interest ==
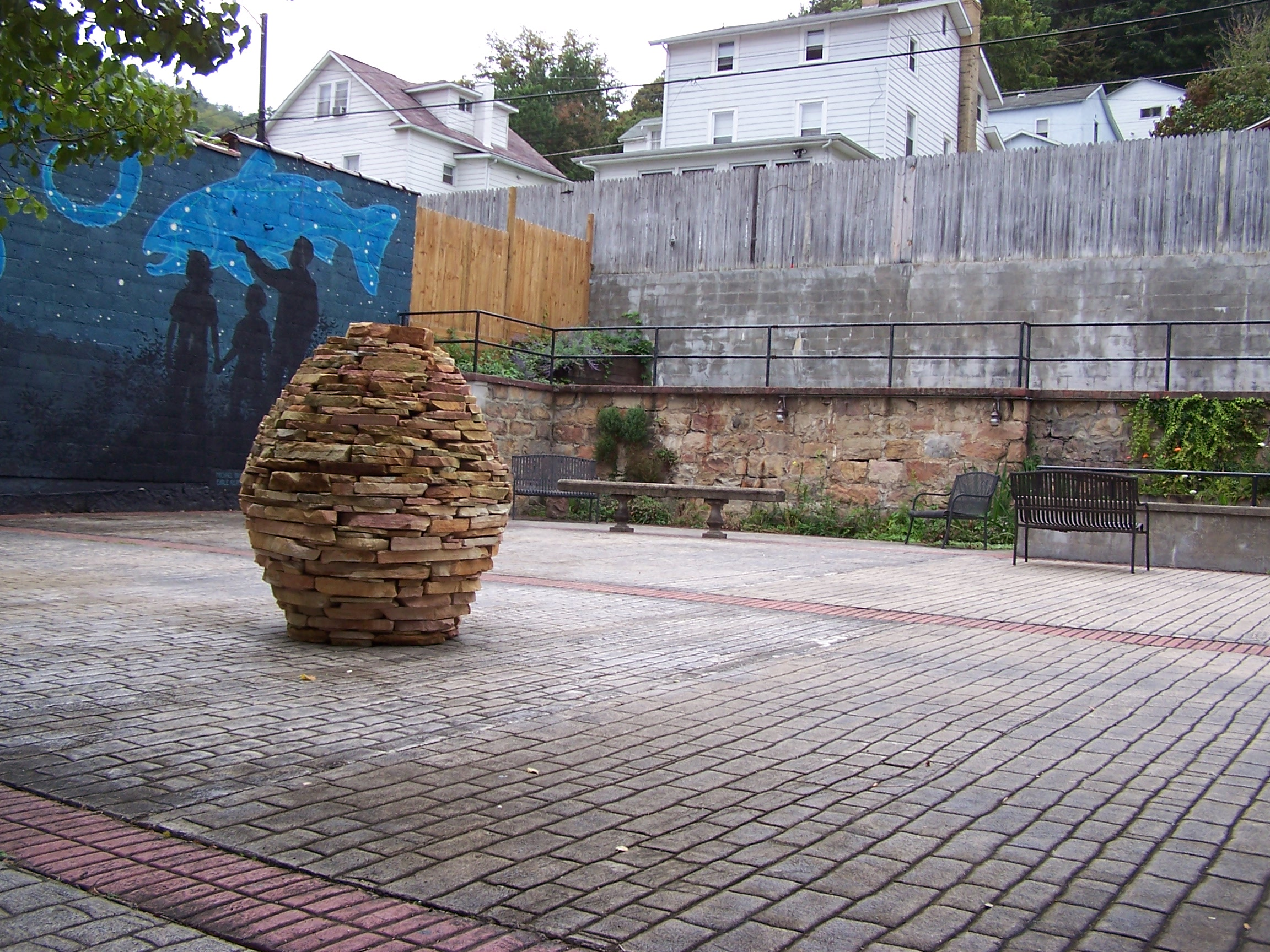
The Sterling Spencer Memorial Sculpture Garden replaced a dilapidated vacant hotel that had partially collapsed. The park is named in honor of a respected wood sculptor from Richwood.

Richwood has a mountain setting with close proximity to Monongahela National Forest and access to a great number of recreational areas. Three tributaries of the Gauley River (Williams River, Cranberry River, and Cherry River) all flow wild within this portion of the forest. A scenic highway and visitors center also lie at the intersection of WV 39 and WV 150, which is close to the Cranberry Glades Botanical Area and the Cranberry Wilderness. The Cranberry Glades Botanical Area is the southernmost Canadian-style bog in the world. Summit Lake offers the only flat water recreation in the immediate area. Richwood is also home to Cherry Hill Country Club, a nine-hole golf course located on top of Hinkle Mountain.

== Education ==
Three schools, operated by the Nicholas County Board of Education, serve Richwood students: Cherry River Elementary, Richwood Middle School, and Richwood High School. In 2005, the girls' high school softball team won the school its first team state championship in any sport.

Due to flooding on June 23, 2016, both Richwood High School and Richwood Middle School have been temporarily relocated. The Nicholas County Board of Education plans on renovating the Cherry River Elementary site to house all three of Richwood's schools.

== Healthcare ==
Camden Family Health is the primary healthcare provider within Richwood. It operates a rural health clinic with a full staff including MD, FNP, and RN access. Summersville Regional Medical Center, located in the county seat, offers the nearest emergency room and hospital.

Two hospitals were previously located in Richwood. McClung Hospital was open during the city's boom years in the early 1900s. Richwood Area Community Hospital, formerly known as Sacred Heart Hospital, operated from 1954 until June 2008, when it was forced to close due to poor finances.

== Emergency services ==
The Richwood Volunteer Fire Department serves as Richwood's primary fire and rescue service. They hold an ISO Class rating of 4. They serve the community from their central station located in the middle of town, and provide fire and rescue services to Richwood and surrounding areas.

Richwood Police Department is the city's primary police force. They serve the community from their office located in the municipal building. The Nicholas County Sheriff's Department and West Virginia State Police, which has a detachment located in the city, also provide police service as needed.

Emergency medical services are provided by Redi-Care Ambulance. They are a private ambulance company with one station located in the east end of town. They typically house one ALS unit and one BLS unit at all times.

== Transportation ==
Richwood's primary road is a two-lane highway carrying West Virginia Routes 39 and 55. These highways provide access to U.S. Route 19 to the west and U.S. Route 219 to the east. The original construction of the road portion from Marlinton to Richwood through the Monongahela National Forest was spurred by the Cherry River Navy civic organization, reducing what was a three-hour drive on indirect alternate routes to a current 45-minute drive. It is considered one of the most scenic drives in West Virginia, providing access to a number of National Forest recreation sites.

In the town's early years, the railroad was a popular form of transporting wood, coal, and passengers in and out of Richwood on a daily basis. As time wore on, however, rail traffic decreased. By the early 1980s, trains had been completely replaced by road transportation in the area. The tracks were removed by the end of the decade and the old railroad grade was transformed into a gravel rail-trail for hiking and bicycling.

== Notable people ==
- Stanley Adkins, West Virginia House of Delegates from the 49th district
- Michael Barrett, basketball player and winner of the 1968 Olympic gold medal
- Peter Brunette, film critic and historian
- Jim Comstock, editor of The West Virginia Hillbilly and Richwood News Leader
- Wayland Dean, professional baseball player
- Nancy Douglas, Confederate spy
- Marian McQuade, founder of National Grandparents Day
