= Drennen, West Virginia =

Unincorporated community in West Virginia, United States

- Unincorporated community
- Location within West Virginia Location within the United States
- Coordinates: 38°16′14″N 80°59′53″W
- Country: United States
- State: West Virginia
- County: Nicholas
- Elevation: 1,125 ft (343 m)
- Time zone: UTC-5 (Eastern (EST))
  - Summer (DST): UTC-4 (EDT)
- ZIP codes: 26667
- Area codes: 304 & 681
- GNIS feature ID: 1538315

Drennen is an unincorporated community in Nicholas County, West Virginia, United States. Drennen is located on West Virginia Route 39, 8 miles (13 km) west of Summersville. Drennen has a post office with ZIP code 26667.

Located near Drennen is the Mason-Drennen House, listed on the National Register of Historic Places in 1998.
