= Craigsville, West Virginia =

- CDP
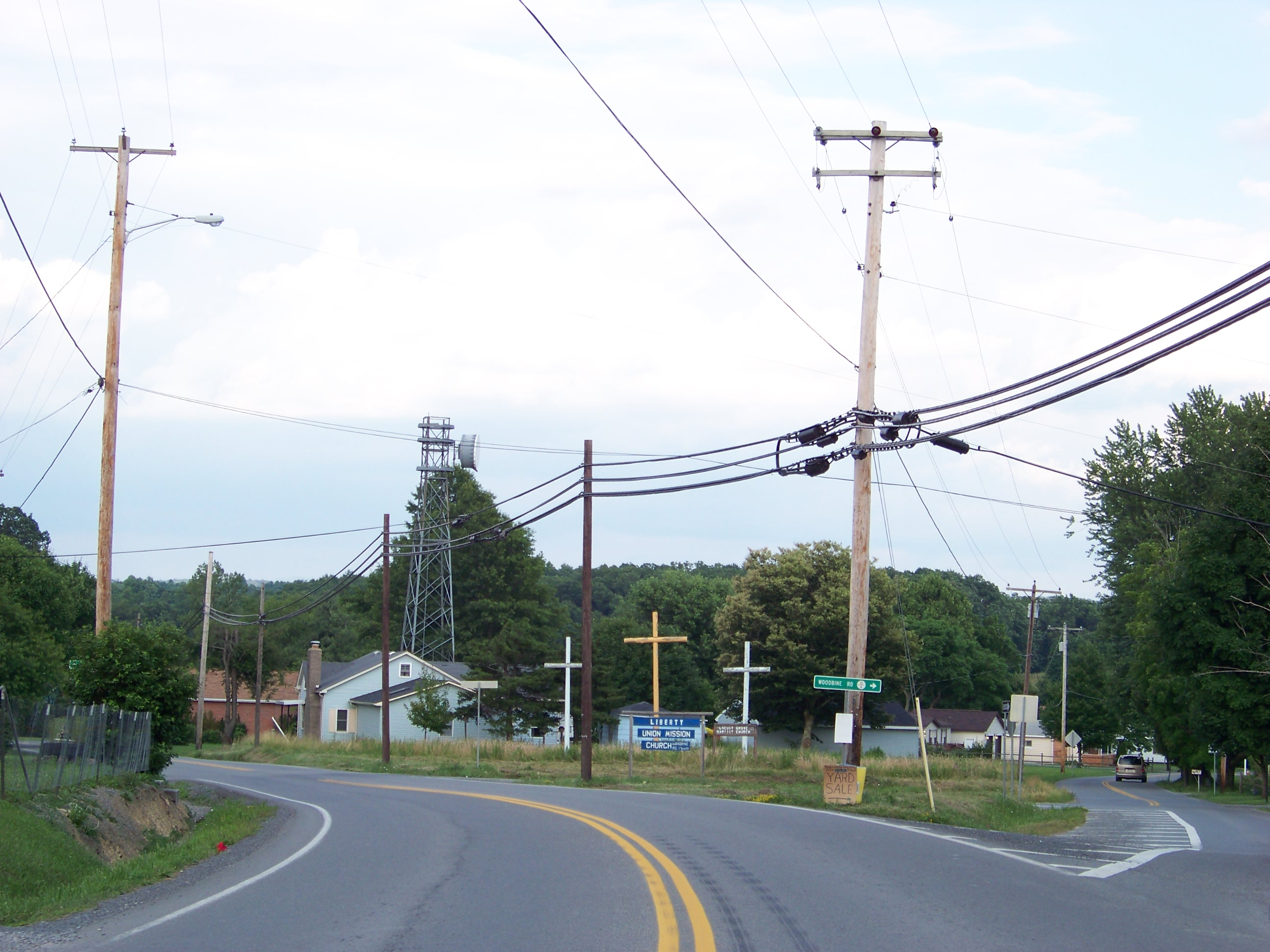

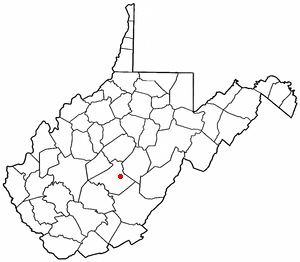
- Location of Craigsville, West Virginia
- Coordinates: 38°20′0″N 80°38′34″W
- Country: United States
- State: West Virginia
- County: Nicholas

Area
  - Total: 6.1 sq mi (15.7 km^{2})
  - Land: 6.1 sq mi (15.7 km^{2})
  - Water: 0 sq mi (0.0 km^{2})
- Elevation: 2,313 ft (705 m)

Population (2020)
  - Total: 2,173
  - Density: 358/sq mi (138/km^{2})
- Time zone: UTC-5 (Eastern (EST))
  - Summer (DST): UTC-4 (EDT)
- ZIP code: 26205
- Area code: 304
- FIPS code: 54-18604
- GNIS feature ID: 1550820

Craigsville is a census-designated place (CDP) in Nicholas County, West Virginia, United States. The population was 2,173 at the 2020 census (down from 2,213 at the 2010 census).

== Geography ==
Craigsville is located at 38°20′0″N 80°38′34″W (38.333389, -80.642766).

According to the United States Census Bureau, the CDP has a total area of 6.1 square miles (15.7 km^{2}), all land.

== History ==
The community derives its name from James Craig, an original owner of the town site.

Located near Craigsville is the Beaver Mill, listed on the National Register of Historic Places in 2001.

== Demographics ==
As of the census of 2000, there were 2,204 people, 920 households, and 655 families residing in the CDP. The population density was 364.1 people per square mile (140.7/km^{2}). There were 1,007 housing units at an average density of 166.4/sq mi (64.3/km^{2}). The racial makeup of the CDP was 99.36% White, 0.09% African American, 0.27% Native American, 0.05% Asian, and 0.23% from two or more races. Hispanic or Latino of any race were 0.23% of the population.

There were 920 households, out of which 30.3% had children under the age of 18 living with them, 58.0% were married couples living together, 11.0% had a female householder with no husband present, and 28.7% were non-families. 25.9% of all households were made up of individuals, and 13.3% had someone living alone who was 65 years of age or older. The average household size was 2.40 and the average family size was 2.86.

In the CDP, the population was spread out, with 24.1% under the age of 18, 8.2% from 18 to 24, 26.1% from 25 to 44, 25.7% from 45 to 64, and 15.9% who were 65 years of age or older. The median age was 39 years. For every 100 females, there were 91.7 males. For every 100 females age 18 and over, there were 86.9 males.

The median income for a household in the CDP was $24,631, and the median income for a family was $30,612. Males had a median income of $28,606 versus $18,150 for females. The per capita income for the CDP was $13,233. About 15.4% of families and 19.8% of the population were below the poverty line, including 25.4% of those under age 18 and 3.9% of those age 65 or over.
