= Cordova (surname) =

Cordova or Córdova is a Spanish surname. Notable people with the surname include:

- Andrés Córdova (1892–1983), President of Ecuador (1939–1940)
- Aquiles Córdova Morán (born 1941), Mexican politician
- Arturo de Córdova (1908–1973), Mexican film actor
- Carmen Córdova (1929–2011), Argentine architect and academic administrator
- Cristina Córdova (born 1976), American sculptor
- Dante Córdova (born 1943), Peruvian lawyer and politician
- David Córdova (born 1984), Chilean footballer
- Delia Córdova (1956–2016), Peruvian volleyball player
- Elle Cordova (born 1988), American folk musician, also known as Reina del Cid
- Emilio Córdova (born 1991), Peruvian chess player
- Félix Córdova Dávila (1878–1938), Puerto Rican politician and judge
- France A. Córdova (born 1947), American astrophysicist and university administrator
- Francisco Córdova (disambiguation), multiple people
- Franco Cordova (born 1944), Italian footballer
- Frederick de Cordova (1910–2001), American stage, motion picture and television director and producer
- Gonzalo Córdova (1863–1928), President of Ecuador (1924–1925)
- Gonzalo Fernández de Córdoba (1453–1515), Spanish general
- Héctor Larios Córdova (born 1954), Mexican politician
- Hendry Córdova (born 1984), Honduran footballer
- Hugo Córdova, Bolivian chess player
- Inés Córdova (1927–2010), Bolivian artist
- Ismael Cruz Córdova (born 1987), Puerto Rican actor
- Jacob De Cordova (1808–1868), British-American businessman and politician
- Jair Córdova (born 1996), Peruvian footballer
- Jeanne Córdova (1948–2016), American activist and writer
- Jorge Cordova (disambiguation), multiple people
- José Ángel Córdova (born 1953), Mexican politician
- José María Córdova (1799–1829), Colombian general and national hero
- Juan Córdova (born 1995), Canadian soccer player
- Juan de Córdova (1503–1595), Spanish Dominican linguist
- Julio Córdova (1911–1986), Chilean footballer
- Kandy Cordova (1936–2023), American politician
- Lorenzo Córdova Vianello (born 1972), Mexican political scientist and academic
- Luis de Córdova y Córdova (1706–1796), Spanish admiral
- Manuel Córdova-Rios (1887–1978), Peruvian herbalist and author
- Margarita Cordova (born 1939), American dancer and actor
- Marty Cordova (born 1969), American baseball player
- Marvin Cordova Jr. (born 1985), American boxer
- Melquisedec Angulo Córdova (1979–2009), Mexican military officer
- Natalia Cordova-Buckley (born 1982), Mexican-American actress
- Nicolás Córdova (born 1979), Chilean footballer
- Nivardo Córdova Salinas (born 1969), Peruvian journalist
- Othón Cuevas Córdova (1965–2020), Mexican politician
- Pancho Córdova (1916–1990), Mexican actor
- Roberto Suazo Córdova (1927–2018), Honduran politician
- Ronald Cordova (born 1946), American politician and lawyer
- Samuel Córdova (born 1989), Mexican volleyball player
- Sebastián Córdova (born 1997), Mexican footballer
- Sergio Córdova (born 1997), Venezuelan footballer
- Tina Cordova (born 1959), American businesswoman and activist
- William Cordova (born 1969), American artist
- Yamilé Córdova (born 1972), Cuban tennis player
- Yasodara Córdova (born 1980), Brazilian programmer and activist
