= Cordova =

Cordova may refer to:

== Astronomy ==
- Cordova Mons, a tall, bright mountain on Iapetus, the third largest moon Saturn.

== Places ==
=== Former states ===
- Emirate of Cordova (756–929)
- Caliphate of Cordova (929–1031)
- Taifa of Cordova (1031–1091)

=== United States ===
- Cordova, Alabama, a city
- Cordova, Alaska, a city
- Cordova Bay, Alaska, a bay in the Alexander Archipelago
- Cordova, Illinois, a village
- Cordova, Kentucky, an unincorporated community
- Cordova, Maryland, a village
- Cordova, Minnesota, an unincorporated community
- Cordova, Nebraska, a village
- Cordova, New Mexico, an unincorporated community and census-designated place
- Cordova, North Carolina, an unincorporated community and census-designated place
- Cordova, South Carolina, a town
- Cordova, Tennessee, a community
- Cordova, West Virginia, an unincorporated community
- Cordova Township (disambiguation)

=== Elsewhere ===
- Córdova District, Huaytará Province, Peru
- Cordova, Cebu, Philippines, a municipality

== Other uses ==
- Cordova (surname)
- Apache Cordova, a mobile software development framework
- Cordova Mall, in Pensacola, Florida
- Córdova Rebellion, an 1839 uprising in Texas
- USS Cordova, an escort carrier of the United States Navy, later transferred to the Royal Navy
- Cordova Hotel, St. Augustine, Florida, United States

== See also ==
- Córdoba (disambiguation)
- Cordova Airport (disambiguation)
- Cordova High School (disambiguation)
- De Córdova (disambiguation)
