= Jessyca Sarmiento =

Peruvian sex worker killed in France

Killing of Jessyca Sarmiento
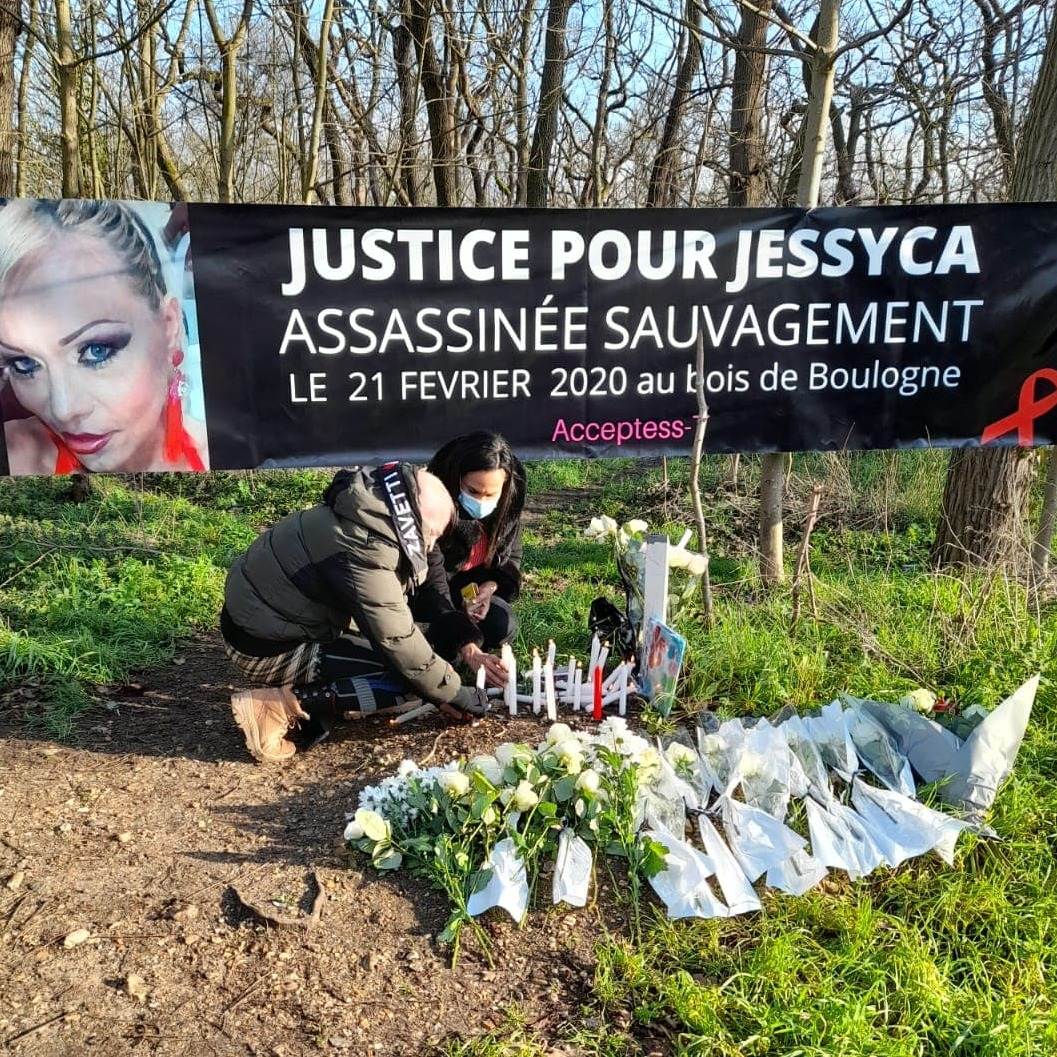
- Members of Acceptess-T at a sign honoring Jessyca. The text reads in English: "Justice for Jessyca - Savagely Assassinated - February 21, 2020 at Bois de Boulogne - Acceptess-T"
- Date: February 21, 2020
- Location: Bois de Boulogne, 16th arrondissement of Paris
- Type: Vehicular homicide
- Perpetrator: Abdoulaye D.
- Deaths: Jessyca Sarmiento
- Verdict: Guilty
- Convictions: Involuntary manslaughter
- Sentence: 5 years imprisonment

Jessyca Sarmiento, a transgender Peruvian sex worker, was killed the morning of February 21, 2020, in Paris’ Bois de Boulogne six months after arriving in France. She was fatally hit by a vehicle 18 months after the murder of her compatriot Vanesa Campos. The killing has been cited by numerous organizations advocating for the rights of migrants, sex workers, and transgender people as an example of an increase in violence against sex workers following France's criminalization of the solicitation of prostitution in 2016. In 2022 the culprit, Abdoulaye D., was convicted of involuntary manslaughter.

== Jessyca Sarmiento ==
Jessyca Sarmiento was born on September 3, 1981, in Peru’s Cañete Province. The sole daughter from her mother’s remarriage, she grew up in socioeconomically vulnerable conditions and survived repeated assaults. After working several years in Argentina as a sex worker (where her transgender half-sister had been murdered), she migrated to France in April 2019 in hopes of finding greater safety, financial security, and HIV treatment. Working in the Bois de Boulogne, she earned enough income to support herself and send a small amount of money to her half-brother and his transgender daughter, whom she hoped to keep in school and off the streets. She began getting support from the transgender rights organization Acceptess-T to transition away from sex work and into culinary arts, take French courses, and regularize her immigration status on health grounds.

She was described in an Acceptess-T statement as “studious, dedicated, and generous, bringing meals for her classmates at every session.” Her French instructor further described her as “reserved and shy”, but determined to master French.

== Killing ==
At approximately 2:30am on February 21, 2020, Sarmiento was struck by a car on the Allée de la Reine-Marguerite. Two witnesses called the police and reported that a Renault with three people inside intentionally accelerated to hit Sarmiento and drove away. Despite efforts by firefighters to save her life, Sarmiento was declared dead at 2:40am.

== Background ==
The killing occurred in the context of an increase in violence against sex workers and one and a half years after the 2018 murder of Vanesa Campos, another transgender Peruvian sex worker, in the Bois de Boulogne. Acceptess-T found that 10 sex workers were murdered in France in 2019, with each of the murders, in the words of Director Giovanna Rincon, leading to “a form of internalization, of normalization of violence”. Shortly after the killing, Rincon reported that it was an "intracommunity theory" that Sarmiento may have been randomly targeted after the drivers got into an altercation with other transgender women earlier in the evening.

In 2016, French law began to ban the solicitation of prostitution, with penalties ranging from 1,500 to 3,500 €. This reform was criticized by many sex worker advocates, who cited a decrease in clients and revenue at the same time as they faced an uptick in violence from clients exploiting their heightened financial vulnerability. Giovanna Rincon explained that “since the death of Vanesa Campos, assaults, sometimes quasi-fatal, keep recurring”. The Syndicat du Travail Sexuel criticized the French government’s continued support for anti-sex work organizations after Campos’ murder and condemned its failure to issue an official evaluation of the 2016 ban on solicitation. Rincon declared that “We are told that this law protects the dignity of the individual, but we, the persons concerned, we the trans migrant women, have the blood of the dead as proof that this is false.”

== Memorials ==
One hundred demonstrators protested the killing on February 29, starting their march at the Allée de la Reine Marguerite. Acceptess-T paid travel expenses for Jessyca’s brother Severino to join the march, and he delivered a speech alongside representatives from STRASS and Acceptess-T Demonstrators denounced the inaction of the French state and of the Secretary of State for Gender Equality, Marlène Schiappa. Act Up-Paris raised the money necessary to repatriate Sarmiento’s body and cover funeral expenses.

One year after Sarmiento's death, Acceptess-T organized a memorial gathering in her honor.

== Investigation, trial, and verdict ==
Paris’ first district of judicial police took charge of the investigation. A Renault Clio matching the description given by witnesses was found abandoned in Paris’ 20th arrondissement on the night of the killing. A voluntary manslaughter investigation was opened, and a young man was arrested in October 2020 and ultimately charged with involuntary manslaughter and destruction of evidence. On February 8, 2022, the suspect, 20-year-old Abdoulaye D., appeared before a Paris tribunal. Investigators showed that D. had been driving without a license under the influence of alcohol and cannabis, had fled the scene of the crime at up to 140km/h, and had subsequently attempted to incinerate his car, upon which Sarmiento's DNA was found. In his defense, D. asserted that he had been speeding away from the Bois de Boulogne right after an altercation with other sex workers and accidentally hit Sarmiento while passing another car on the right, subsequently fleeing the scene in a panic. He was convicted and sentenced to five years in prison, a 10,000 euro indemnity to Sarmiento's family, and repayment of expenses incurred by Sarmiento's family and Acceptess-T. He did not appeal the conviction, and his lawyer approvingly described the sentence as “measured”.
