= Córdoba =

Córdoba most commonly refers to:

- Córdoba, Spain, a major city in southern Spain and formerly the imperial capital of Islamic Spain
- Córdoba, Argentina, the second largest city in Argentina and the capital of Córdoba Province

Córdoba, Qurtuba, or Cordoba may also refer to:

== Places ==
=== Argentina ===
- Córdoba Province, Argentina

=== Colombia ===
- Córdoba Department
- Córdoba, Quindío
- Córdoba, Bolívar
- Córdoba, Nariño
- Córdoba (wetland), a wetland of Bogota

=== Kuwait ===
- Qurtuba (Kuwait), area in Kuwait

=== Mexico ===
- Córdoba, Veracruz

=== Spain ===
==== Historical Islamic states ====
- Emirate of Córdoba, 756–929
- Caliphate of Córdoba, 929–1031
- Taifa of Córdoba, 11th century

==== Other places in Spain ====
- Province of Córdoba (Spain), of which Córdoba is the capital
  - Córdoba (Spanish Congress electoral district), the electoral district representing the province
- Córdoba (Vino de la Tierra), a wine-producing region in Spain
- Kingdom of Córdoba, historical territorial jurisdiction of the Crown of Castile

=== Venezuela ===
- Córdoba Municipality, Táchira, a municipality of Táchira State, Venezuela

== Cars ==
- Chrysler Cordoba
- SEAT Córdoba

== Ships ==
- MSC Cordoba, a 2008 Liberia registered container vessel operated by MSC
- SS N. Y. U. Victory, a Victory class ship, converted in 1947 for civilian use and renamed Cordoba

== Sports organisations ==
- Bball Córdoba, Basketball team based in Córdoba, Andalusia
- Córdoba CF, a Spanish football club
- RCD Córdoba, defunct Spanish football team from Córdoba, Andalusia
- Córdoba F.C., a defunct Colombian football team, from Montería, Córdoba, Colombia

== Treaties ==
- Cordoba Agreement, 2006, an agreement between the Governments of Spain, the UK and Gibraltar
- Treaty of Córdoba, establishing Mexican independence from Spain in 1821

== People with the surname ==
=== Arts and media ===
- Marcelo Córdoba (born 1973), Argentine actor
- Pedro de Cordoba (1881–1950), American actor
- Ximena Córdoba (born 1979), Colombian model and actress

=== Military and politics ===
- Ana Fabricia Córdoba (c.1959 – 2011), Colombian human rights activist
- Francisco Hernández de Córdoba (Yucatán conquistador) (died 1517)
- Francisco Hernández de Córdoba (founder of Nicaragua) (died 1526)
- Gonzalo Fernández de Córdoba (1453–1515), Spanish military leader
- Gonzalo Fernández de Córdoba (1585–1635), Spanish military leader
- Hisham III of Córdoba (1026–1031), the last Caliph of Córdoba
- Jaime Córdoba (politician) (1950–2024), Curaçaoan politician
- José María Córdoba (1799–1829), general of the Colombian army during the Latin American War of independence
- Piedad Córdoba (born 1955), Colombian senator
- Subh of Cordoba (c. 940 – c. 999), regent of the Caliphate of Córdoba

=== Religion ===
- Eulogius of Córdoba (died 857), Spanish bishop, one of the Martyrs of Córdoba
- Pelagius of Córdoba (c. 912–926), Christian boy and saint who died as a martyr in Cordoba

=== Sports ===
==== Colombian footballers ====
- Hernan Córdoba (1989–2009)
- Iván Córdoba (born 1976)
- Jaime Córdoba (footballer) (born 1988)
- Jhon Córdoba (born 1993)
- John Córdoba (born 1987)
- Óscar Córdoba (born 1970), goalkeeper

==== Other footballers ====
- Alberto Cordoba (1925-2019), Mexican
- Carlos Córdoba (born 1958), Argentine coach and former player
- Fernando Gastón Córdoba (born 1974), Argentine midfielder
- Iñigo Córdoba (born 1997), Spanish

==== In other sports ====
- Allen Córdoba (born 1995), Panamanian baseball infielder
- César Córdoba (born 1980), Spanish professional kickboxer and boxer
- Nicolás Córdoba (born 1989), Argentine artistic gymnast
- Ricardo Cordoba, (born 1983), Panamanian boxer
- Víctor Córdoba (boxer) (born 1962), Panamanian super middleweight boxer

== Other uses ==
- University of Cordoba (disambiguation), several educational facilities throughout the world
- Córdoba (Albéniz), a musical composition by Isaac Albéniz
- Nicaraguan córdoba, the currency of Nicaragua
- Cordoba Fighting Dog, an extinct breed of fighting dog
- Cordoba Initiative, a multi-national, multi-faith organization dedicated to improving Muslim-West relations
- Park51, real estate and community center in Manhattan, New York, originally named Cordoba House

== See also ==
- Cordoba House, a planned Islamic community center in Lower Manhattan, US
- Cordoba Foundation, a UK-based research and advisory group
- 365 Corduba, an asteroid
- Cordova (disambiguation)
