= Marie Cau =

Mayor of Tilloy-lez-Marchiennes, France

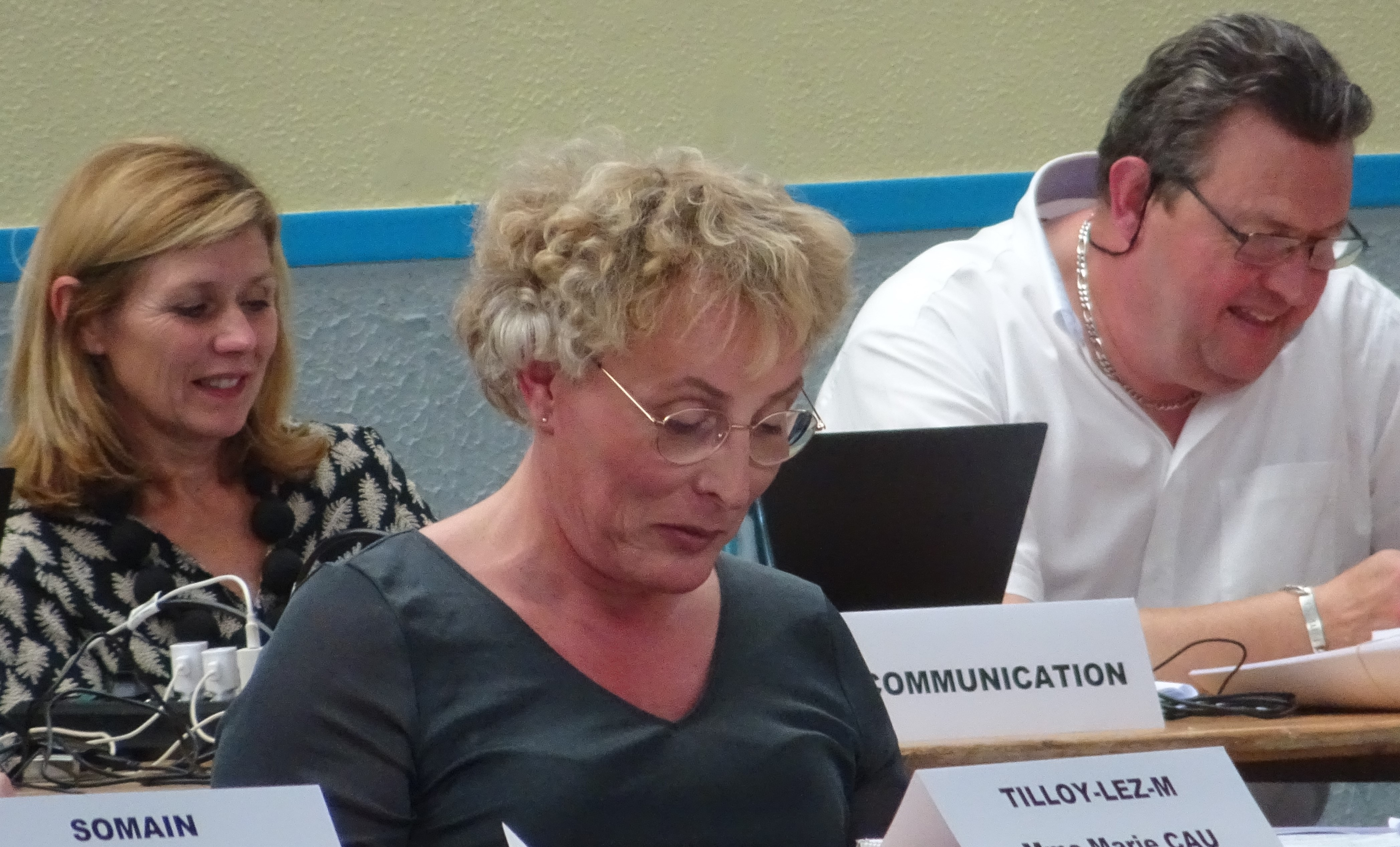
Marie Cau in 2020.

Marie Cau (French: [ko] born 1965 ) is a French engineer, former mayor of Tilloy-lez-Marchiennes, and minor candidate for President of France.

== Political career ==
Cau was elected mayor of Tilloy-lez-Marchiennes on March 15, 2020, with the entire municipal council also being members of her electoral list, and was inaugurated in May of that year following a long delay due to the COVID-19 pandemic, becoming the first known openly transgender mayor in France. She garnered international media coverage and congratulations from French gender equality minister Marlene Schiappa, SOS Homophobie co-president Veronique Godet, and Giovanna Rincon, head of the transgender rights group Acceptess-T.

Cau ran on a platform of developing social and environmental policies, particularly sustainable agriculture. As mayor, she secured repairs to the section of the historical Paris-Roubaix route (now part of the RD81) which crosses the village, and other infrastructure improvements.

Cau stated she would run for President of France in 2022. She stepped down as mayor of Tilloy-lez-Marchiennes in January 2025.

== Education and personal life ==
Cau was born in Roubaix and at the time of her election had lived in Tilloy-lez-Marchiennes for 20 years. Cau says she was always drawn to feminine things, and put on her mother's lipstick when she was two, but was pressured by her mother and siblings not to do such things and to be a boy.

Cau worked as an agricultural technician and engineer. After studying agriculture, she went on to study computers, and then joined the army; at this time she met her first wife and had three children. She felt pressure to stay in the closet at her job while she worked to support her children.

Her older sister Myriam Cau was the former Green vice-president of Nord-Pas-de-Calais.

== See also ==
- Camille Cabral, first trans woman elected (to any office) in France
