= Vanesa Campos =

Peruvian-born transgender prostitute murdered in France (1982–2018)

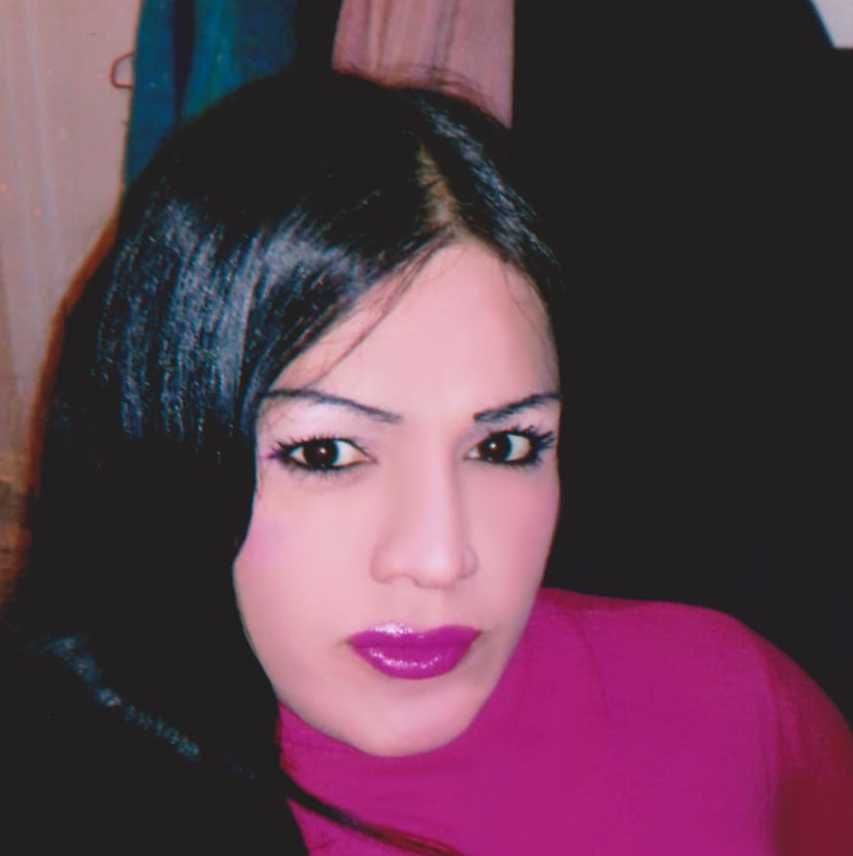
- Born: 1982; Cayaltí, Peru
- Died: August 17, 2018 (aged 35–36); Paris, France
- Cause of death: Gunshot wounds
- Occupation: Sex worker

Vanesa Campos (died 17 August 2018) was a trans sex worker and an undocumented migrant from Peru living in Paris. She was 36 when she was murdered at the Bois de Boulogne during the night of 16 to 17 August 2018. Her murder occurred after she resisted a group of men armed with a gun stolen from a police officer.

This crime took place in a context of rising insecurity in the Bois de Boulogne, a situation which is the result of a new law aimed at reinforcing the "fight against the prostitution system” by penalizing prostitutes’ clients, thus forcing sex workers to retreat deeper into the woods where they are safe from police intervention but left at the mercy of mafia gangs.

Ten suspects, nine Egyptians and a Syrian, including at least two minors, were arrested between August 2018 and January 2019 in France and Germany. The prosecutors seeks to charge nine men for the murder. On January 30, 2022, two of them were sentenced to 22 years' imprisonment for organised murder, and the others were sentenced to three to six years' imprisonment.

== Biography ==
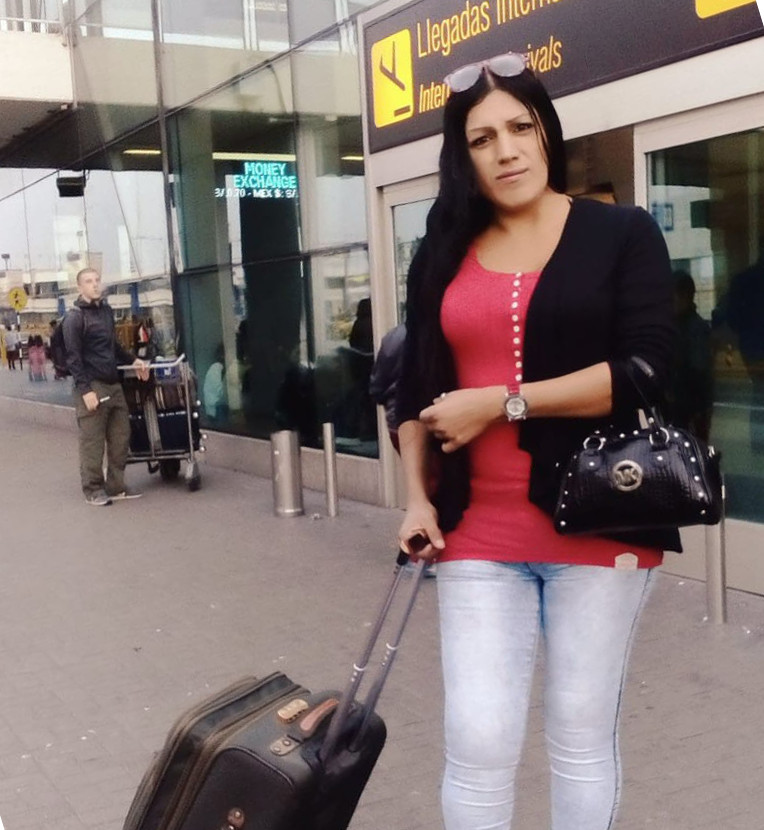
Vanesa Campos, leaving from Lima to Paris

Vanesa Campos grew up in Cayaltí, a small village in northern Peru. She was forced to leave her home as her parents did not understand her gender identity. She became friends with Karen who came to be her role model and taught her how to defend herself. They both left their villages to go and live in the capital, Lima. In 2012, after Argentina passed a law allowing citizens to change their civil status upon a simple declaration, Karen and Vanesa Campos left for Buenos Aires. However, Argentinean police have remained particularly cruel when dealing with trans people, pushing Vanesa to move to Europe. She settled in Paris without legal immigration papers with the goal to earn enough money to buy a house for her isolated and widowed mother. She started living with two friends in a one-bedroom apartment in the neighbourhood of porte de Clignancourt, in the 18th arrondissement of Paris.

In September 2016, she began to work as a prostitute every night near the road of Pré Catelan, an area in the Bois de Boulogne occupied by a small community of trans people from Latin America, such a location kept them safe from the control and harassment of pimps. Despite her derisory income, she managed to send a little money every month to her mother, her brother, and two sisters. According to one of her roommates, “she was never ashamed when she was asked what she was doing for a living.” Officially notified that she had to leave French territory, she could have however gotten her situation regularised on grounds of her health. Yet, Vanessa used to be sporty and was involved with a few organisations and in particular with Acceptess-T. According to Giovanna Rincon, the head of this organisation, Vanesa was eager to help the weak, never afraid to “go on the front line to defend her friends and work colleagues.” A friend describes her as “a huge loudmouth who wasn't scared of anything.”

== Murder ==
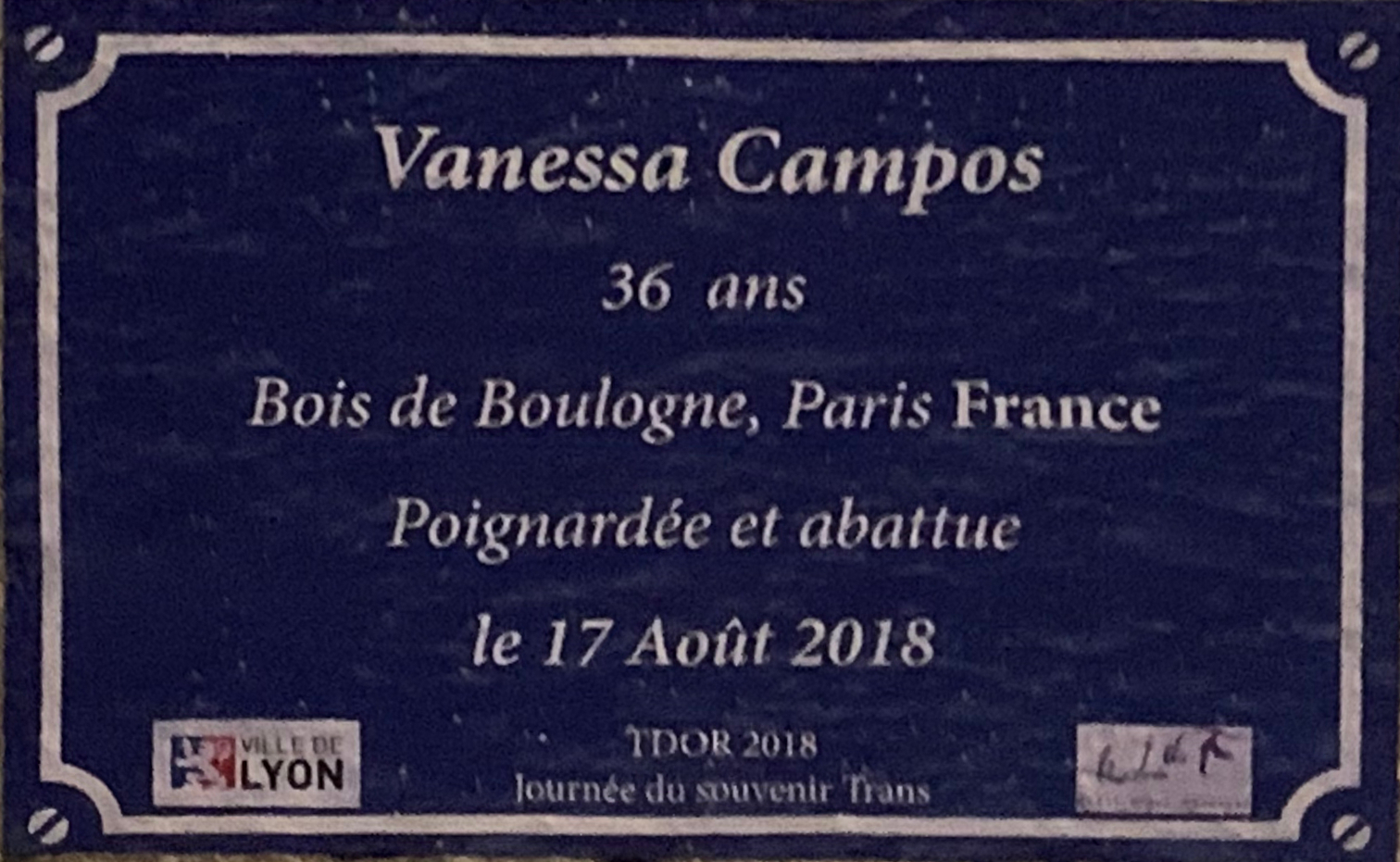
Commemorative plaque in Lyon

The murder of Vanesa Campos happened in a context of increasing criminality in the Bois de Boulogne. Throughout the summer 2018, a gang of Egyptians were racketeering prostitutes and their clients, their attacks were daily. Vanesa Campos tried to alert the police during one of their patrols, however, due to a lack of proof the officers did not respond to her complaints: “It is always the same. They would ask for their identities, but we didn’t know them. Even though we were very precise in our descriptions, they just wouldn’t listen. After all, we were just a bunch of hookers. Who cares about us?” Testimonies show, indeed, that police officers would mock and humiliate trans prostitutes and undocumented immigrants instead of helping them. Those who were both undocumented and working as prostitutes never dared filing official complaints at the police station for fear that they would get deported.

Vanesa Campos then implemented the use of an alert signal for dangerous situation and handed out tear gas canisters to her fellow prostitutes. She hired a bodyguard, himself an undocumented worker, who on August 14, 2018, managed to scare off one of the gangsters; the latter, on the same night, broke into a police vehicle and stole a gun (other sources place the theft on August 9). On August 16, 2018, about 11pm, the Egyptians came back in numbers and attacked the bodyguard. Vanesa Campos was then left alone to face them and screamed for help: “¡Chicas todas!” One of the assailants then shot her in the chest before shooting several times in the air. They went at her fiercely and unrelentingly using utility knives, sticks, and a handgun, they then fled the scene in a car. At 11.30pm, Vanesa Campos's colleagues found her lying in a pool of her own blood. Paramedics, who arrived 30 minutes later, were unable to resuscitate her.

Her body was repatriated to Cayaltí. Although her civil status had not been changed, upon a request of her mother, her tombstone does bear the name Vanesa. A small memorial was set in the Bois de Boulogne to pay tribute to her memory.

== Reactions ==
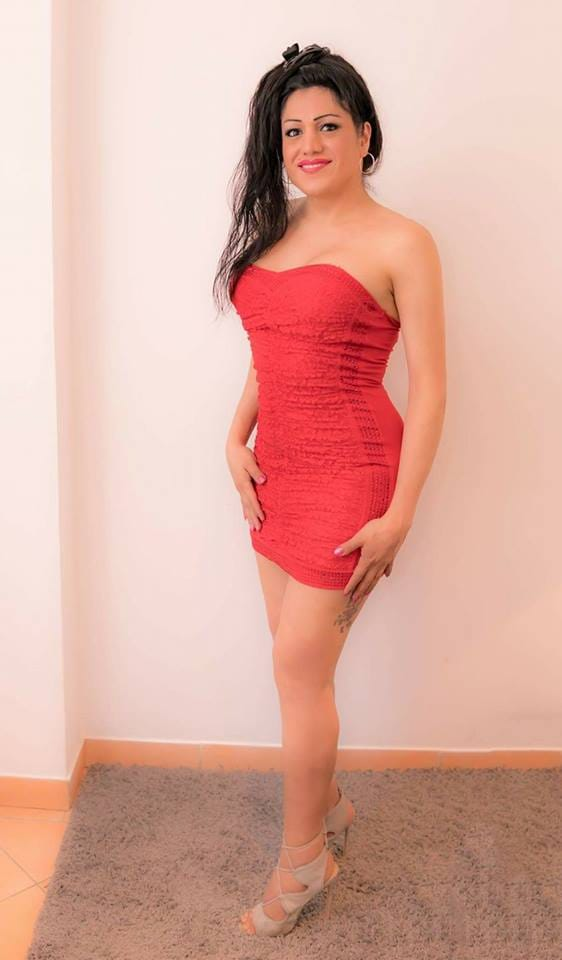
Vanesa Campos in Paris

The day after the murder, indifference was the general reaction. Newspapers misgendered the victim by quoting a police report about the murder of a (male) “transvestite-prostitute,” which constituted a “second killing of Vanesa.” A police source declared in the Parisien that the victim was “wrong” in facing the aggressors of her client.

In a communiqué, the union for sex labour (STRASS) and the organisation Acceptess-T declared that:

We have in our hearts the strange impression that our dead never spark any emotions. For us, there is never a national mourning. There is never some kind of official commemoration. […] The assassinations of trans women who are sex workers are everything but rare. […] Our deaths are all and always normalised. A hooker who dies is very much like a character in a video game, there is nothing bad or serious in killing her. It is like a sexist joke: we laugh and then move on to something else.

The spokesperson for STRASS, Thierry Schaffauser, claimed that “if a gay man had been attacked in the Marais, there would have been a reaction.”

An intimate ceremony was held a week after the murder, on Thursday, August 23. It took place on the very scene of the attack. The gathering was followed the next day by an homage from non-profit organisations which got the attention of the press: on August 24, a few hundred people, mostly close relations of the victim (about 300 people according to the newspaper Le Monde), participated to a solemn march in her honour that went from the Porte Dauphine in Paris all the way to the actual place of the murder. Another aim of the event was to demand justice for the victims of attacks and to denounce the deafening silence of the media.

Under the slogans “Trans murdered, State Accomplice!” and “Arrest our aggressors, not our clients,” the organisations taking part to the march called for the repeal of the laws suppressing and criminalising prostitution from 2003 to 2016, which had been responsible for the surge of violence in places where prostitution was practiced. Other rallies took place in France on the same day, in Lille and Lyon.

The absence of any reactions from the government was also decried. Marlène Schiappa, the Secretary of State for the Equality between men and women and who defended a law against sexual and sexist violence, was called out for her lack of reaction by deputy Raphaël Gérard (LREM) on August 22, 2018. She broke her silence after a week to address her “sincere condolences to the family and friends of the victim,” adding that “every woman should be protected against sexist and sexual violence, every act of violence must be condemned.”

The French weekly magazine Paris Match published, in early September 2018, the photograph of the naked corpse of Vanesa Campos. As a reaction, Acceptess-T gathered enough money to pay for Vanesa's sister's plane ticket and bring her to France. The organisation provided the services of their lawyer and joined her in the filing of a civil case. The magazine was ordered to pay €12000 in damages to the victim's sister.

On September 21, 2018, mobilisation was still strong and a new march was organised in Paris, the foreign press thus started to spread Vanesa's story, announcing that several suspects had been arrested.

In 2019, a year after the murder, about fifty people joined in a commemorative rally. A friend of Vanesa declared: “we will keep on fighting, not only for Vanesa, but for every woman who works here, for trans people, for LGBTI people.” On her part, the co-president of Acceptess-T promised: “we won’t give up. We will have no rest until the murderers are condemned.”

== Investigation and judicial consequences ==
Thanks to the testimonies of Vanesa's colleagues and friends, the police were able to draw the profiles of the attackers. On Monday, August 20, 2018, five people, aged from 16 to 30 years old, were charged with "murder in organized band" and "theft and deterioration," they were consequently taken into custody before their trial. An anonymous witness identified and denounced the head of the gang to the investigators who tapped his phone. The 25-year-old man was arrested at his home and joined the other five suspects in jail. Out of the 10 suspects, 9 were arrested within a month. Their age ranged from 16 to 30 years old and were of Egyptian and Syrian nationalities. At least two of them were unaccompanied minors and should have been under legal care when the crime occurred. In late 2018, Mahmoud K., designated as the shooter by the other suspects, was identified in Germany after a European bench warrant was issued, followed by a three-month hunt. He was arrested in January 2019 and then extradited to France. In May 2019, the murder weapon was found in the woods. The prosecutors sought to charge nine men for the murder. The trial opened in January 2022. On January 30, 2022, two men were sentenced to 22 years' imprisonment for organised murder, and the others were sentenced to three to six years' imprisonment.

== A consequence of French authorities' "fight against the prostitution system" ==
The murder of Vanesa Campos resparked the debate over the penalization of prostitution. In 2016, on the initiative of the minister of women's rights, Najat Vallaud-Belkacem who was strongly opposed to prostitution which she deemed necessarily a forced situation, the French parliament abolished soliciting as an offense and, for the first time in the history of the fight against prostitution in France, it introduced the penalization of clients. According to this new law, "aimed at reinforcing the fight against prostitution as a system," buying a prostitute's services was then punishable with a fine of €1,500 ($1,750), up to €3,750 for repeat offenders.

Organisations denounced the responsibility of political actors in the death of Vanesa Campos. According to sex workers, the consequences of the new law are numerous and highly harmful: prostitutes would now be forced to accept clients and practices they used to refuse, compelling them to hide in order to ensure the anonymity of their clients. As a consequence, prostitutes face ever more threatening clients, demanding unprotected sex and lower prices. A study led by two non-profits among 589 sex workers revealed that 88% of them are opposed to the law, and 78% saw their income decline, putting them in an ever more precarious situation. A 50-year-old prostitute told Le Monde that "for the past two years, there has been a wave of repeated aggressions, such a thing has been unseen so far," while Giovanna Rincon proclaims that "the law is 100% responsible for the death of Vanesa".

== See also ==
- List of Peruvians
- Jessyca Sarmiento
