= Córdoba Municipality =

Córdoba Municipality may refer to:

- Córdoba, Quindío, Colombia
- Córdoba, Bolívar, Colombia
- Córdoba, Nariño, Colombia

== See also ==
- Córdoba (disambiguation)
