= Nancy Hart Douglas =

American Confederate guide and spy

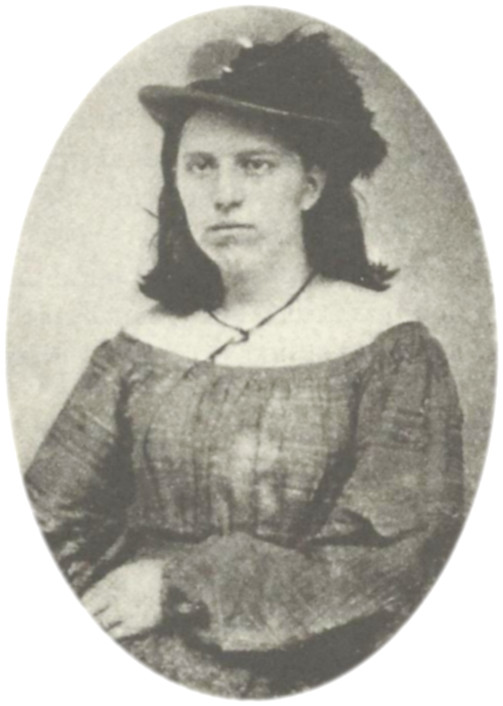
- Born: 1846
- Died: Unknown
- Burial place: Nancy Hart Cemetery
- Spouse: Joshua Douglas
- Children: 2

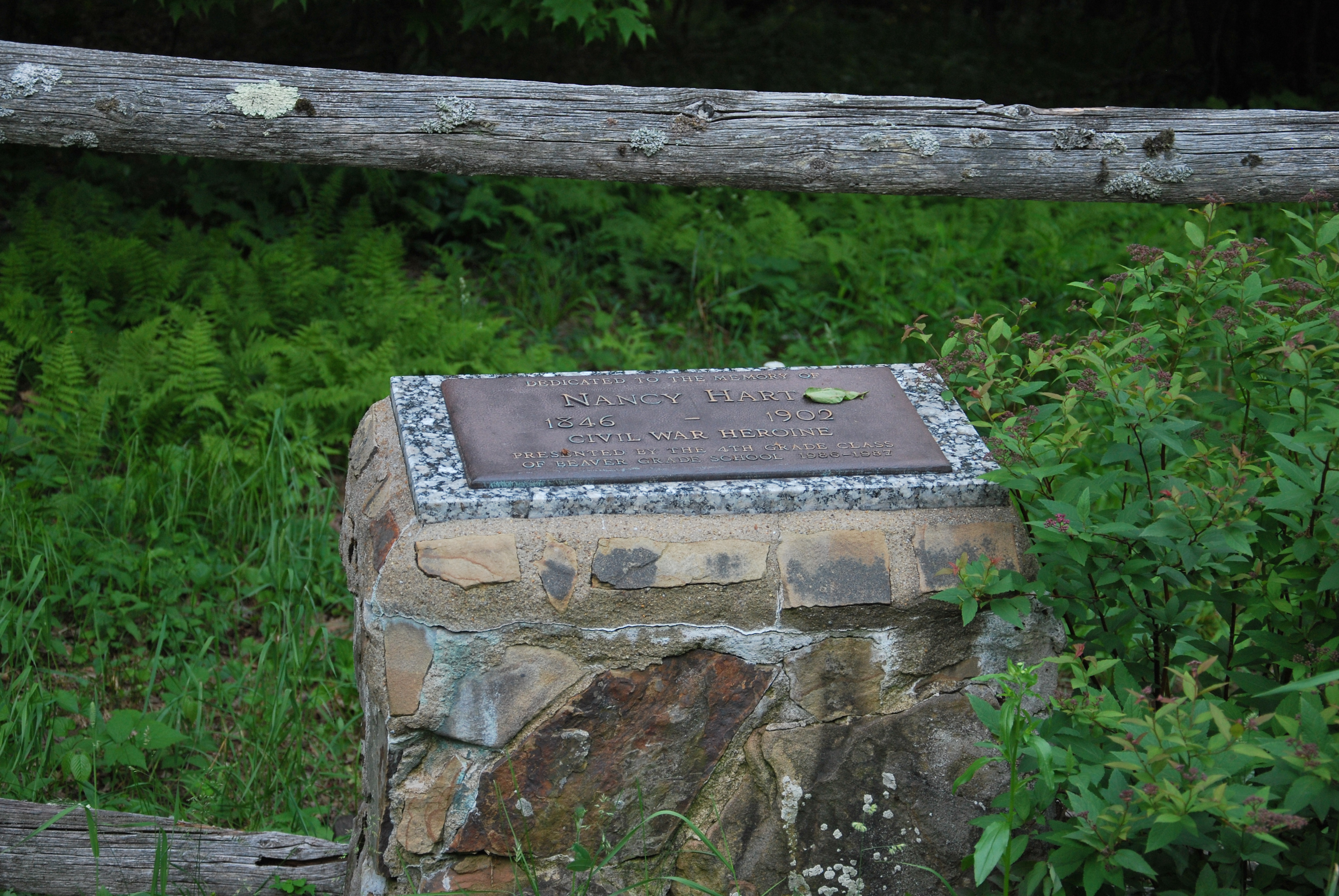
Memorial to Nancy Hart at Manning Knob cemetery

For the American rebel heroine, see Nancy Hart.

Nancy Hart Douglas (c. 1846—1902 [1913(?)]) was a scout, guide, and spy for the Confederacy during the American Civil War. Serving first with the Moccasin Rangers, a pro-Confederate guerrilla group in present-day West Virginia, she later joined the Confederate Army and continued to serve as a guide and spy under General Stonewall Jackson.

== Early life ==
Nancy Hart was born in 1846 in Raleigh, North Carolina, she and her family moved to Tazewell, Virginia, when she was an infant. Her mother was first cousin to Andrew Johnson, who became president after the assassination of President Abraham Lincoln. Hart lived with her family in West Virginia until the outbreak of the Civil War, at which time she developed great sympathy for the South.

During the early years of her life on her family's farm, she became an expert with rifles, pistols, and riding horses. She could reportedly operate a gun or handle a horse as well as a man. She eventually moved in with her sister and brother-in-law, Mary and William Clay Price. William Clay Price was not a soldier but did things for the Confederate army in the evenings. One day the Union soldiers came to question him. They took him away and killed him down the road from his family. This fueled Nancy's rage and hatred toward the Union cause.

== Civil War ==
For nearly two years, Hart worked for the Moccasin Rangers as a spy and a scout, posing as a farm girl to gather intelligence. She saved the lives of a number of wounded Confederate soldiers by hiding them with sympathizers. She also personally led several cavalry raids against federal outposts. After one such skirmish, she was briefly captured, but she persuaded the Union soldiers to let her go based on the fact she was a woman.

In early 1861, after a contingent of Union troops passed through her town, Hart's sympathy for the Confederacy prompted her to leave home and join the Moccasin Rangers, led by the infamous Perry Conley. Conley died in the summer of 1862, and with his loss the Moccasin Rangers disbanded, although Hart continued to spy on Union movements. She became a valuable asset to the Rangers, serving both as a spy and a guide to the local region. Hart became so famous and such an enigma for Union forces in West Virginia that a reward was offered for information leading to her capture in 1862.

Shortly thereafter, she and a female friend were captured by Union troops led by Lt. Col. Starr and taken prisoner in Summersville, West Virginia. Here, she was photographed unsmiling and unemotional, by an itinerant photographer. According to legend, Hart did not smile because of the attire she had to wear for the picture. Civil War telegrapher Marion H. Kerner, an officer who befriended Hart at the encampment, later made her story famous in the magazine, Leslie's Weekly. That same night, Hart escaped from the Union camp on Starr's horse and joined a regiment of about 200 Confederate soldiers led by Major R. Augustus Bailey (the Moccasin Rangers had been disbanded since the death of Perry Conley).

A week later, the Confederate troops overran Summersville, burning many of the public buildings and taking Lt. Col. Starr prisoner. Marion Kerner was also captured, but due to the kind treatment he had given Hart during her own imprisonment, she convinced the Confederate officers to release him. However, he was promptly recaptured after attempting to relay a telegram to Union forces. He was released at the war's end.

Francis Miller's 1911 "Photographic History of the Civil War" repeats the claim Hart was captured by Lt. Col. Starr of the 9th West Virginia; a photograph was taken of Hart; she killed a guard with his own gun and a week later led a Confederate unit which captured Starr and the 9th West Virginia July 25, 1862. Official Records of the Civil War mention the capture of Companies "A" and "F" of the 9th West Virginia Infantry at Summersville, West Virginia, July 25, 1862—but have no mention of an arrest/escape of a Nancy Hart in 1862. Likewise the Official W.V. Adjutant General Report on the 9th W.V. do not show any casualties for July 18–25, 1862

== After the war ==
After the war, Hart married the former Ranger Joshua Douglas, and they lived in Spring Creek near Cordova in Greenbrier County during the remainder of their lives. They had two sons, George and Kennos. Nancy later lived with her son on Manning Knob seven miles south of Richwood where her grave now lies. Records of Nancy's death are conflicted. Though her tombstone says she died in 1902, there are no official records of her death in Greenbrier County, where she lived, or in state records.

Her husband's death record in the Greenbrier County Courthouse lists him as "Married" at the time of his death in 1907. Eyewitnesses put her alive and well in Richwood in 1911 when Halley's comet was visible. "This means there will be another war," she is alleged to have said. Her two granddaughters, Moppie McCollum and Myrtle Hollandsworth, were interviewed in 1992 and both recalled attending Nancy's funeral around 1913.

The marker on Nancy's grave was erected by a 4th-grade class at Beaver Elementary School in Craigsville, WV, in 1987 as a class project. The students got the date of Nancy's death from Boyd Stutler's account of her life in his 1963 book West Virginia in the Civil War. Her grave is located on Manning Knob in Greenbrier County, West Virginia, south of Richwood.

The grave of Joshua Douglas is in the Richwood City Cemetery in Richwood, WV. A mural depicting the famous photograph of Nancy Hart is also in Richwood.

== Adaptation ==
Nancy Hart's story has been recreated in the novel Rebel Hart by Edith Hemingway and Jacquelin Shields.

In 1992, Susan Matthis Johnson's musical drama "Bury Me By Nancy Hart" was produced in Richwood, West Virginia by the Mill Whistle Players. The play was produced with cooperation from the National Endowment for the Humanities and the West Virginia Department of Culture and History. The musical drama retells the story of Nancy Hart's capture and escape in the early years of the Civil War. But the story begins in April 1965 when a fire tower watchman was laid to rest beside the grave of the Confederate spy. Ivan Morgan Hunter was a Southern sympathizer who had become enamored of Nancy's memory while working in a fire tower over her grave. The character of Ivan Morgan Hunter is a dramatized version of the real-life U.S. Forest Service watchman of the same name (1881–1965). While the play depicts him as a political sympathizer to serve the narrative, the historical Hunter was a local poet and naturalist whose request to be buried at the site stemmed from his decades of service manning the fire tower on the mountain. Ivan and his gravedigger recount through flashbacks the famous story of how Nancy outwitted her captors and escaped. She led a cavalry of Stonewall Jackson's men into Summersville and burned it to the ground.

The play was produced in 1993 in Summersville, West Virginia, as an outdoor drama by the Old Main Players.

Johnson also wrote the script for "Nancy Hart, Live!" a one-woman show starring Pam Butcher also produced by the West Virginia Department of Culture and History's "History Alive" program in 1994.

In 2006, Johnson published an article in the Hur Herald entitled, "Will the Real Nancy Hart Please Come Forth." This article cites various historical accounts of Nancy Hart's life.
