= Giovanna Rincon =

French trans activist (born 1969)

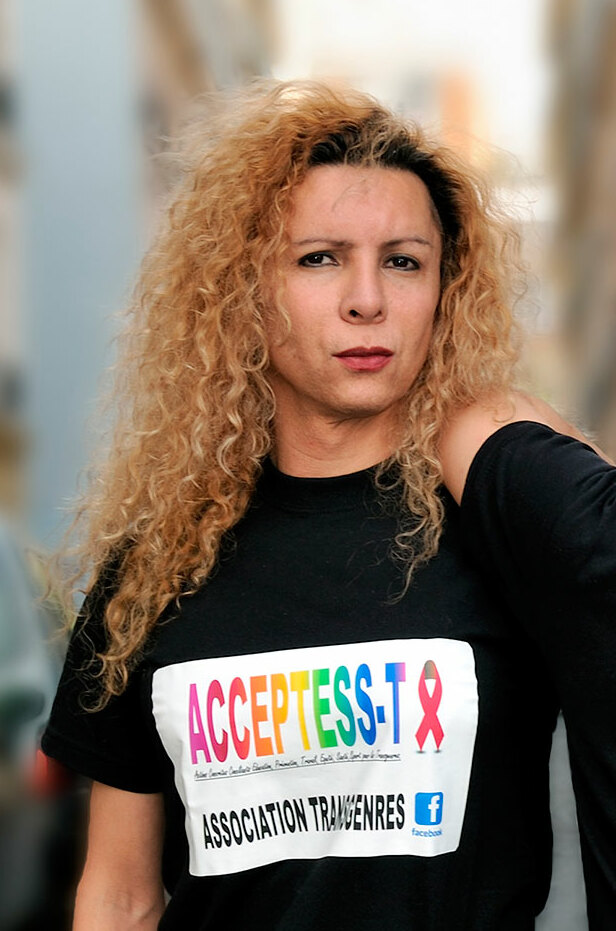
- Rincon in 2013
- Born: 1969 (age 56–57); Bogotá, Colombia
- Occupation: Director of Acceptess-T
- Known for: Transgender, migrant, sex worker, HIV-positive rights activist
- Awards: 2018 "coup de gueule" Out d'or

Giovanna Rincon (born 1969) is a transgender rights activist in France. Born in Bogotá, Colombia, and residing in Paris since 2002, she is the director of the transgender rights organization Acceptess-T, as well as the spokeswoman of the Fédération Trans et Intersexes and the Syndicat du Travail Sexuel.

== Early life ==
Giovanna Rincon was born in 1969 in Bogotá, Colombia, to an impoverished household; her father was a shoemaker and her mother was a housewife. She first learned about transgender women through profiles of Roberta Close and Eva Robin in a magazine. At twelve years old, she began to express her feminine identity. After she self-administered hormone therapy through the use of contraceptive pills she was thrown out of her home and spent the next eight months living on the streets. Eventually, her lover convinced her to return home; since neither he nor her family accepted her as a woman, she put her gender transition on hold. At fifteen years old, with the help of her lover, she opened a hair salon, took on employees, and became the primary breadwinner for her family. Two years later, motivated by her transgender employees, she came out as trans to her boyfriend and family, leading to the end of her relationship and her second departure from home.

== Emigration and activism ==
At 20 years old, she discovered that she was HIV-positive and a doctor estimated her life expectancy at three years. She sold her hair salon and in June 1993 moved to Rome, where she hoped to access lifesaving care, escape from anti-trans violence, and make a living as a sex worker. There, she suffered from police violence and discrimination due to her race, gender, and HIV status. In 1998, antiretroviral treatments for HIV became available and she secured treatment. However, undocumented transgender sex workers often suffered from denial of care in Italy, and some of the friends she brought to get treatment instead found themselves deported. As a result, she joined an organization fighting for the rights of sex workers in northern Italy.

In November 2002, she took a friend suffering from late stage AIDS to Paris' Pitié-Salpêtrière Hospital for treatment. In 2004, she joined the French transgender activist group Prévention action santé travail pour les transgenres (PASTT)—which had helped protect her friend's access to treatment—and helped coordinate their temporary housing services. After moving back and forth between Italy and France and serving time in an Italian prison for lacking legal immigration status, she decided to permanently relocate to Paris in 2005. In 2006, she resigned from her coordinator position at PASTT (though she stayed on as a volunteer), citing concerns that they didn't provide enough support to help women find alternatives to sex work.

In July 2010, Rincon quit sex work and founded her own organization, Acceptess-T, to support transgender people, migrants, sex workers, and HIV-positive people. The central goal of the organization was to build up the autonomy of vulnerable trans women by helping them find financial resources, learn French (including French administrative jargon), and enforce their fundamental rights such as access to care, work, asylum, and sports activities. A year later, the association had 180 members, 90% of whom were transgender.

== Advocacy ==
Rincon advocated against France's 2016 law outlawing the solicitation of prostitution, which she warned would further isolate sex workers and put them in greater personal danger. She held the law to be "100% responsible" for the murders of Vanesa Campos and Jessyca Sarmiento in 2018 and 2020, respectively, and condemned the French government's subsequent inaction.

She has called for the French state to make changes to one's legal gender freely available as a first step of one's gender transition, rather than conditioning it on already having completed one's transition.

== Personal life ==
Rincon's family have reconciled with her, and she periodically travels to Colombia to visit them.

== See also ==
- Aum Neko – co-chair of Acceptess-T
