= Aum Neko =

Thai activist (born 1993)

- อั้ม เนโกะ
- Born: Saran Chuichai; December 29, 1993 (age 32); Bangkok, Thailand
- Other names: Aum Neko; Mimi Chuichai
- Education: Thammasat University
- Occupation: Activist
- Years active: 2013–present
- Known for: Lèse-majesté protesting

Saran Chuichai (Thai: ศรัณย์ ฉุยฉาย; born 29 December 1993), also known by the pseudonym Aum Neko (Thai: อั้ม เนโกะ), is a Thai activist and a political refugee in France. She is known for campaigning against Thailand's lèse-majesté laws, as well as for the rights of trans people and sex workers.

She has been a refugee in France since 2015, having fled persecution by the National Council for Peace and Order. She co-chairs the French trans support association Acceptess-T.

== Early life ==
Neko was born in Bangkok on December 29th, 1993. Originally given the name "Sarun Chuichai", she was assigned male at birth.

She studied English and German at Chulalongkorn University for a year before attending Thammasat University.

Like most Thai universities, Chulalongkorn demands students wear a uniform matching their sex, regardless of their gender.. Neko found Thammasat University "to be known as a more liberal institution, and to be more respectful of human dignity" where uniforms were not strictly mandatory. Nonetheless, uniforms remained mandatory during exams and in school ID photos, with penalties for noncompliance ranging up to expulsion.

In 2012, Neko publicly criticized article 112 of Thailand penal code. Later that year, she helped replace the university's flag with a black flag in protest of the dean's ultra-royalist stance. She was subsequently suspended for two years. Due to her refusal to wear an assigned uniform and her various protests around school, Neko found herself the target of a campaign aiming for her permanent dismissal from campus.

In 2013, Neko launched a provocative campaign against assigned uniforms, putting up posters depicting uniformed students simulating sex acts. The campaign caught the public's attention, but viewers were neither shocked nor won over.

== Lèse-majesté, military coup and exile ==
Later that year, in September 2013, television presenter Fah Pornitipa (also known as Pontipa Supatnukul or Phornthipa Supatnukul) filed a police report, accusing Neko of having committed lèse-majesté during the taping of Pornitipa's show Best of Your Life. Neko is said to have criticized the monarchy's lack of transparency and the rule that Thai citizens must stand up for the national anthem in theaters and movie theaters. The show was never aired.

During the 2014 Thai coup d'état, Neko faced direct threats of death, torture, and imprisonment. After contacting the German and French embassies, she was able to leave Thailand and obtain political asylum in France. On June 13th, a warrant was issued for her arrest, and she was stopped at Incheon International Airport before being released by South Korean authorities.

In 2015, the Bangkok Post confirmed that Neko, Thai historian Somsak Jeamteerasakul, and political historian Jaran Ditapichai were still wanted for lèse-majesté, and that Thailand had asked for their extradition. That same year Neko officially became a French political refugee.

In 2016, Neko received additional death threats after publishing social media posts celebrating the death of king Rama IX.

== Paris Attack ==
On the evening of 17 November 2019, Neko and fellow refugee Nithiwat Wannasiri, a musician with the Thai band Faiyen (ไฟเย็น), were violently assaulted. The investigators found that the assault was premeditated, with pictures of Neko, Wannasiri, and Jaran Ditapichai found on the assailants' phones. The attackers were arrested trying to steal a scooter while attempting to flee the crime scene. Both men, Daniel Vokal, 28, and Jakub Ozek, 26, were Czech nightclub bouncers. They told the investigators they were in Paris to take part in a march organized by a far-right group they belonged to, but later retracted that statement. Ozek added that he agreed to be paid 50,000 Czech crowns (about $2,500 US dollars) to commit the assault, before also recanting the statement. Both men were sentenced to twenty-six and thirty months in prison, respectively.

Vokal and Ozek were sponsored by Petr Donatek, another Czech who paid for their airfare, hotel rooms, and was seen buying drinks for them, as well as filming the assault. Donatek was able to go back to the Czech Republic before being tried in France and sentenced to four years in prison.

Donatek maintained ties with Czech far-right figure Tomio Okamura. Other similar assaults have occurred against Thai refugees abroad, including, in the case of Pavin Chachavalpongpun, in Japan. During the investigation into the latter, Japanese police also suspected Czech criminals, according to Chachavalpongpun. These events, as well as the geographical proximity between Prague and Bavaria, where King Vajiralongkorn maintains a residence, have led to some speculation that the Thai Crown could have sponsored such attacks against refugees abroad. These claims remain unsubstantiated.

== Current work and political views ==
Neko is the co-president and spokeswoman for the organization Acceptess-T, which is dedicated to helping transgender people in the France, most notably immigrant sex workers. She is also a spokeswoman for the Syndicat du travail sexuel (STRASS), campaigning for the decriminalization of sex work patronage.

On August 22, 2023, billionaire Thaksin Shinawatra was allowed back into Thailand following a 17-year exile. His return was made possible thanks to a collaboration with the Thai military junta.. Neko has been a longtime supporter of Shinawatra, and now aligns with his more conservative, royalist discourse. She denounces the political party Move Forward as a "lackey of western capitalism".

== See also ==
- Giovanna Rincon - director of Acceptess-T
