= Antonio Castellanos =

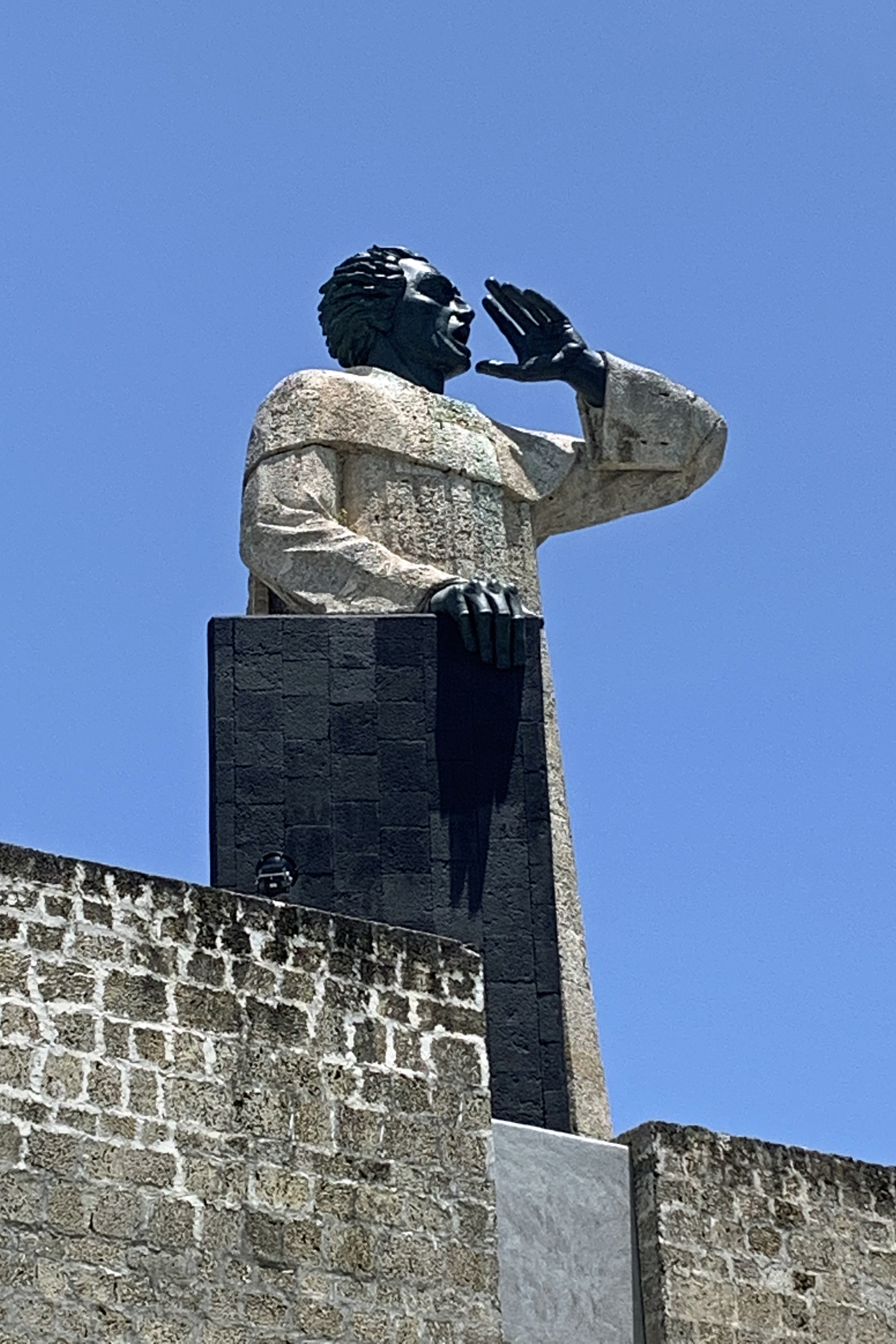
Sculpture of Antonio de Montesinos by Antonio Castellanos, Santo Domingo

Antonio Castellanos Basich (born 5 March 1946) is a Mexican sculptor. He is probably best known for his large sculpture of Antonio de Montesinos delivering his sermon at the seafront of Santo Domingo in the Dominican Republic (1982) and the geometrical cubic forms he added to the St. Peter's Basilica in the Vatican (1977).

== Career ==
In 1963-4 he studied drawing at the Escuela Nacional de Artes Plásticas and painting and sculpture at the Instituto Nacional de Bellas Artes, and was apprenticed to his stepfather sculptor Federico Canessi in the 1960s and 1970s. Castellanos and Canessi's projects included the monument at Netzahualcoyotl Dam in Malpaso, Chiapas, the Mahatma Gandhi Monument in Chapultepec, Mexico City, the Salvador Allende monument in Ciudad Sahagún, Hidalgo (1973), and the 7-metre high Father Kino monument (1974) and the General Ignacio Zaragoza equestrian monument (1976) in Tijuana.

In May 1977, Castellanos, Ricardo Cruz and Fundatier Galindo contributed the geometrical cubic forms in the St. Peter's Basilica in the Vatican. Castellanos is noted for his large sculpture of Antonio de Montesinos delivering his sermon facing the Caribbean sea at the seafront of Santo Domingo in the Dominican Republic. The stone and bronze statue is 15 meters tall and was donated to the Dominican people by the Mexican government and inaugurated in 1982 by the presidents of Mexico and the Dominican Republic. Castellanos is also noted for his "monumental head" of Diego Rivera at the Dolores Olmedo Museum in Mexico City

Castellanos was awarded an Award of Honor for his sculpture "Germinación" at the Mexico City Museum of Modern Art's 1967 Biennale. Author Antonio Espinoza wrote in his book 'Four Decades After the Muralists' "Castellanos "stands out for his interpretations of femininity and maternity".
