= National Torch Movement =

Mexican political organization

National Torch Movement Movimiento Antorchista Nacional
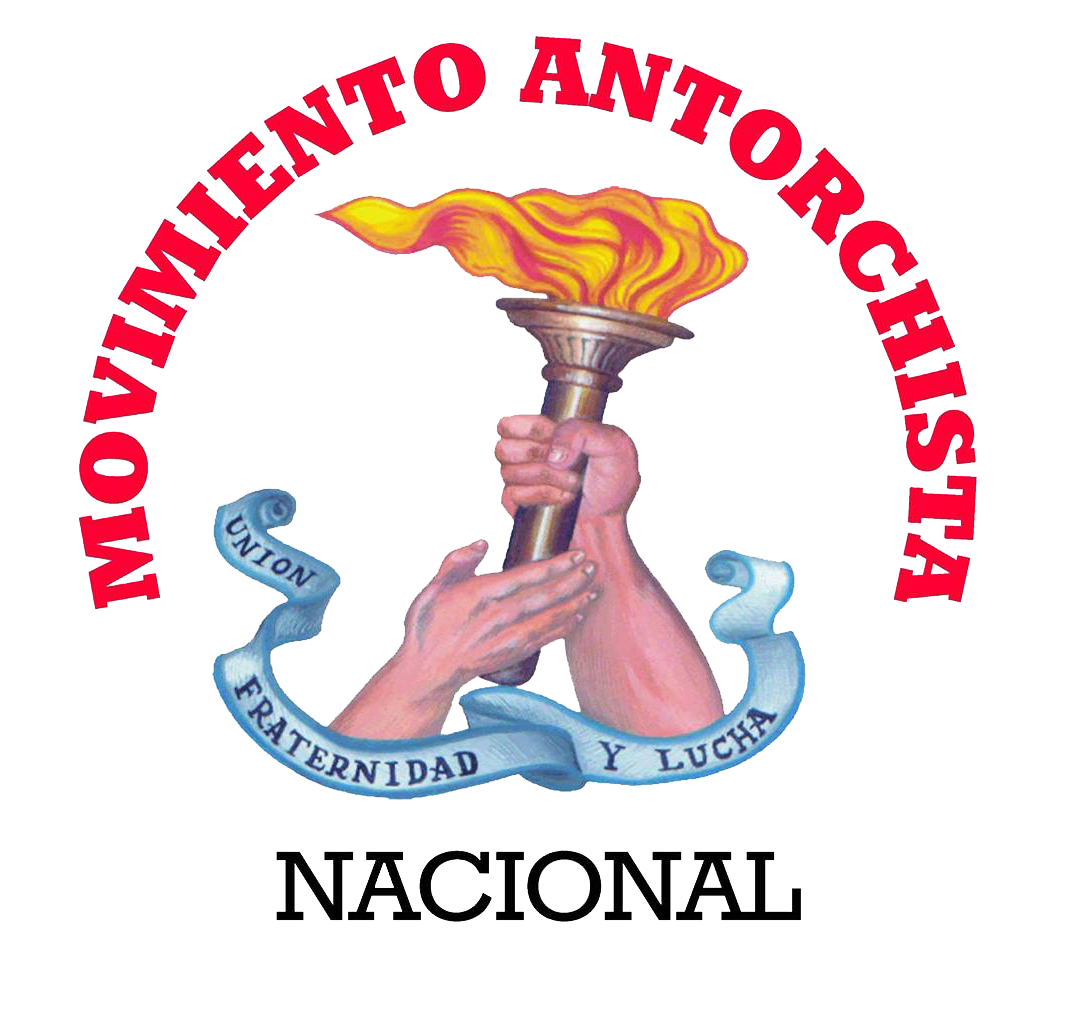
- General Secretary: Aquiles Córdova Morán
- Founded: 1974
- Headquarters: Mexico City
- Ideology: Agrarianism; Labourism
- Political position: Left-wing
- Slogan: "La organización de los pobres de México" ("Poor People's Organization of Mexico")

Website
- movimientoantorchista.org.mx

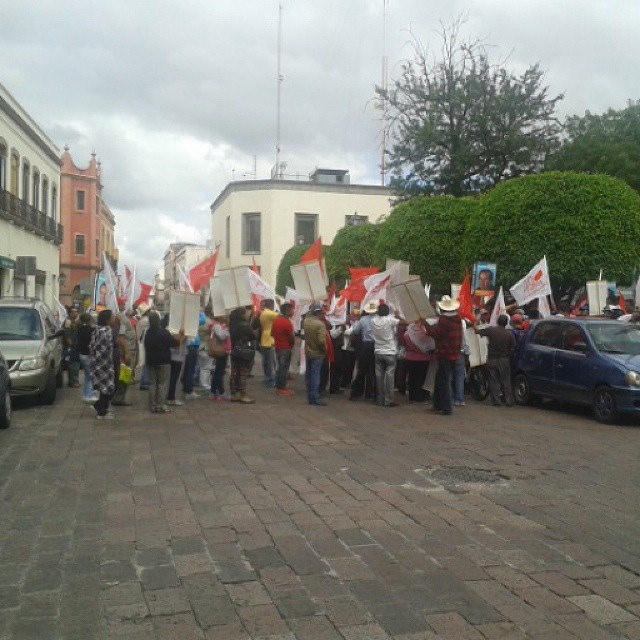
Antorcha Campesina protesters block a road in Querétaro in 2014

The Movimiento Antorchista Nacional or Antorcha Campesina ("National Torch Movement" or "Torch of the Peasantry") is a Mexican political organization whose main objective is the eradication of poverty in Mexico. It has been repeatedly accused of corruption, though no indictments have been reported.

It was founded in 1974 in the town of Tecomatlán, located in the poor region of the Mixteca Baja, in the state of Puebla, by a group of 40 college students and peasants led by agronomist Aquiles Córdova Morán, who still serves as the movement's general secretary. It has a strong national presence among the most underprivileged sectors of the population, including students and peasants.

In 2014, it organized numerous major events across the country as part of the celebrations for its 40th anniversary. The largest of these events was held at the Estadio Azteca in Mexico City, with an estimated attendance of 100,000 people. It is an independent popular movement that does not receive any resources from political parties, business institutions, or government agencies. It is financed by contributions from its political members and a network of small businesses.

In October 1988, the movement adhered to the Institutional Revolutionary Party (PRI). However, in 2016 they announced that they would create their own party, since their moral code was always different from that of the PRI.

They protested against Andrés Manuel López Obrador's government mainly because of the cuts it made to the 2020 federal budget expenditures. They also protested against the PRI in the Valley of Mexico, calling for food programs for poor families.

In April 2025, the movement inaugurated the Aquiles Córdova Morán Theatre in Tecomatlán, described as "the largest cultural venue" in La Mixteca.
