= Antonio de Montesinos =

16th-century Spanish Catholic friar and missionary

The Reverend Antonio de Montesinos OP
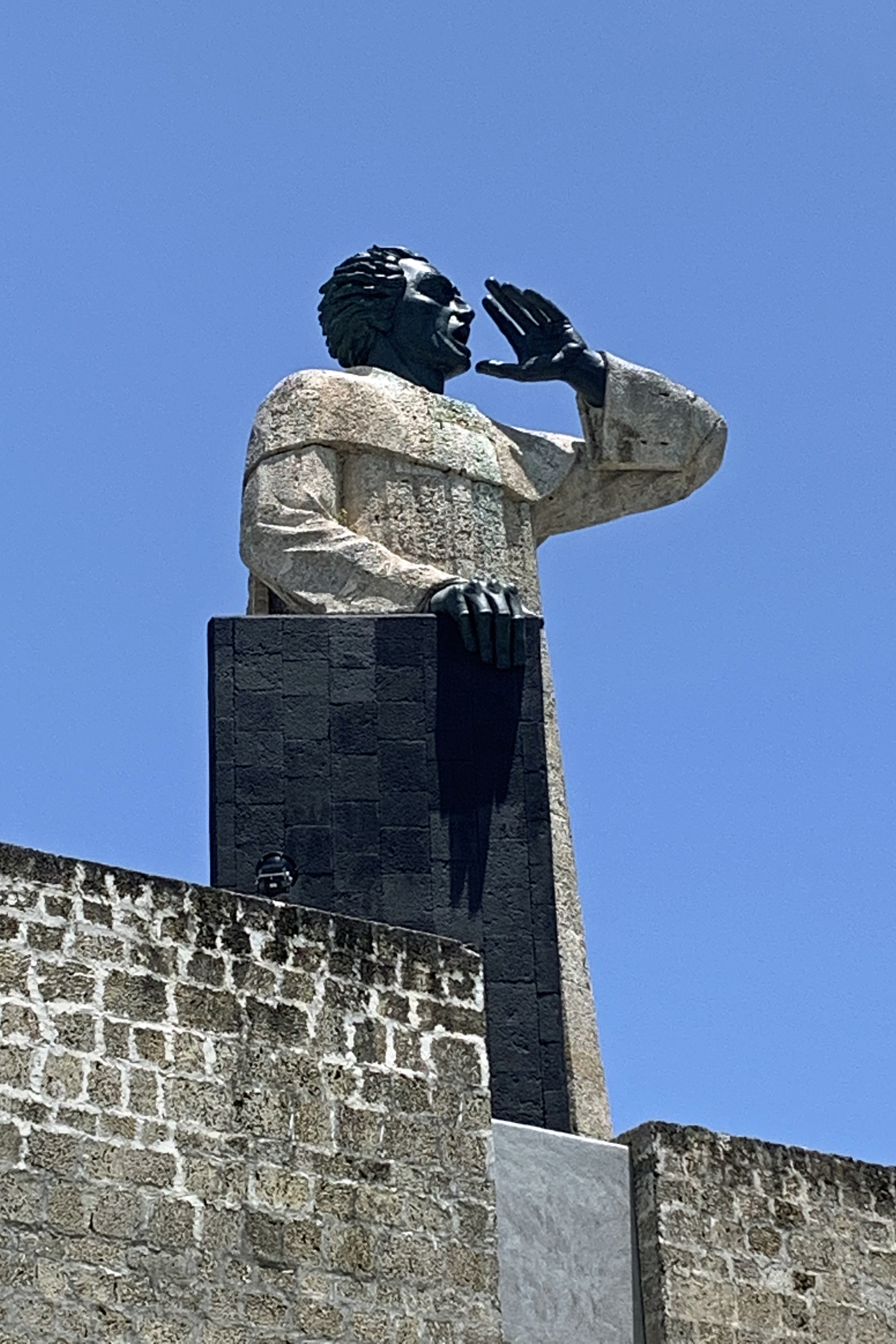
- Sculpture by Antonio Castellanos Basich
- Native name: Antón de Montesino

Personal details
- Born: Salamanca, Spain
- Died: 1540 New Granada
- Denomination: Catholic
- Motto: I am the voice of Christ in the desert of this island.

Antonio de Montesinos or Antonio Montesino, OP (c. 1475 – June 27, 1540), was a Spanish Dominican friar who was a missionary on the island of Hispaniola (now comprising the Dominican Republic and Haiti). With the backing of Pedro de Córdoba and his Dominican community at Santo Domingo, Montesinos was the first European to publicly denounce the enslavement and harsh treatment of the indigenous peoples of the island. His censure initiated an enduring struggle to reform the Spanish conduct towards all indigenous people in the New World. Montesinos's outspoken criticism influenced Bartolomé de las Casas to head the humane treatment of Indians movement.

== Early life ==
Very little is known about Montesinos's early life. He became a Dominican friar at the convent of St. Stephen in Salamanca, and while Montesinos was here, he may have received an education. He was also a part of the first group of Dominican missionaries to go to Hispaniola in September 1510, under the leadership of Pedro de Córdoba.

== Sermon ==
On December 21, 1511, the fourth Sunday of Advent, Montesinos preached an impassioned sermon. He criticized the practices of the Spanish colonial encomienda system, and decried the abuse of the Taíno Indian people on Hispaniola.

Listing the injustices that the indigenous people were suffering at the hands of the Spanish colonists, Montesinos proclaimed that the Spanish on the island "are all in mortal sin and live and die in it, because of the cruelty and tyranny they practice among these innocent peoples.""During his sermon, Montesinos also proclaimed that neither he nor any of the other missionaries would allow these slaveholders to partake in confession." According to Bartolomé de las Casas, who was a witness, Montesinos asked those in attendance:

Tell me by what right of justice do you hold these Indians in such a cruel and horrible servitude? On what authority have you waged such detestable wars against these people who dwelt quietly and peacefully on their own lands? Wars in which you have destroyed such an infinite number of them by homicides and slaughters never heard of before. Why do you keep them so oppressed and exhausted, without giving them enough to eat or curing them of the sicknesses they incur from the excessive labor you give them, and they die, or rather you kill them, in order to extract and acquire gold every day.

The sermon outraged the settlers and prominent citizens of Hispaniola, including the governor, Diego Columbus, son of Christopher Columbus, as well as other high-ranking representatives of the king. Montesinos's sermon had a formative impact upon Las Casas, who heard it firsthand. Las Casas became well known for his advocacy of the rights of indigenous peoples of the Americas.

The primary goal of the Preaching Friars (Dominicans) in the New World was to aid and represent the aboriginal American Indians under Spanish and Portuguese rules, for which they fought for over three centuries.

== Reactions ==
As a result of the friars' protests at Santo Domingo, King Ferdinand II initially ordered that Montesinos and other Dominicans who supported him be shipped back to Spain. Ferdinand, at first, referred to the preaching of Montesinos as "a novel and groundless attitude" and a "dangerous opinion [that] would do much harm to all the affairs of that land." After returning to Spain, Montesinos and his supporters were able to persuade the king of their righteous agenda and principles.

As a result, the king convened a commission that promulgated the Laws of Burgos, the first code of ordinances to protect the indigenous people. The laws regulated the treatment and conversion of the indigenous people, and also limited the demands of the Spanish colonizers upon them.

== Later life ==
In July 1526, under the leadership of Lucas Vásquez de Ayllón, Montesinos, two other Dominicans, and 600 colonists established San Miguel de Gualdape, the first European settlement in what would later become the United States. Founded near Sapelo Sound on the Coast of Georgia, the colony lasted about four months before it succumbed to disease, starvation, and a hostile Indian population. Immediately after the death of Ayllón in October 1526, the settlement was abandoned. Montesinos and the other remaining 150 survivors returned to San Domingo. Before they returned home, it is presumed that Montesinos and the other Dominicans became the first priests to celebrate Mass in the present-day United States.

When Montesinos returned to Hispaniola, he continued to play a prominent role in the region. In 1528, he accompanied Fray Tomás de Berlanga to Spain to see Charles V on matters of "great importance." While in Spain, Montesinos was appointed protector of the Indians in the Province of Venezuela. Charles V then granted the province to Ambrosio Alfinger and Bartolome Sayller, representatives of the Welser banking family, German creditors of the emperor. Montesinos accompanied the German expedition to Venezuela in 1529. On June 27, 1540 Antonio de Montesinos was murdered by an officer of the expedition due to his strong opposition to the exploitation of the Indians.

== Legacy ==
A large statue of Montesinos delivering his sermon is at the seafront of Santo Domingo in the Dominican Republic. Facing the sea, the stone and bronze statue is 15 meters tall and was designed by Mexican sculptor Antonio Castellanos. It was donated to the Dominican people by the Mexican government, and dedicated in 1982 by the presidents of Mexico and the Dominican Republic.

== Sources ==
- Hanke, Lewis. (1946) "Free Speech in Sixteenth-Century Spanish America," The Hispanic American Historical Review, 26,2:135-149.
- Hoffman, Paul E. (1990). A New Andalucia and a Way to the Orient: The American Southeast During the Sixteenth Century. LSU Press. ISBN 0-8071-1552-5.
- Márquez, Luis Arranz. "Antonio Montesino". Real Academia de la Historia (in Spanish).
- Pagden, Anthony (1992). "Introduction". A Short Account of the Destruction of the Indies, by Bartoleme de Las Casas. Penguin Group. pp. xiii–xli. ISBN 0140445625.
- Patterson, Jack E. (2010). Fonseca: Building a New World. pp. 214–215. ISBN 978-1441494917.
- Seed, Patricia. (1992). "Taking Possession and Reading Texts: Establishing the Authority of Overseas Empires," The William and Mary Quarterly, 3,49,2:183-209.
- Thomas, Hugh (2003). Rivers of Gold. New York: Random House. pp. 294-300. ISBN 0375502041.
- Warner, Carl. (1987). "'All Mankind Is One': The Libertarian Tradition In Sixteenth Century Spain," The Journal of Libertarian Studies, 8,2:293–309.
