= César Garcés Carranza =

Peruvian psychotherapist and social worker

- Born: 21 September 1951 (age 74); Lima, Peru
- Education: Southwestern College, Fordham Graduate School of Social Service, Yeshiva University
- Website: psychotherapy.health.blog

César Manuel Garcés Carranza (born 21 September 1951 in Lima) is a Peruvian psychotherapist.

== Biography ==
Garcés Carranza was born in Lima, Peru. The psychotherapist spent his childhood and adolescence in the Lince of Metropolitan Lima. In 1975 he moved to the United States and entered Southwestern College graduating with a Bachelor's Degree in Psychology and Social Work. Later he entered the Fordham Graduate School of Social Service obtaining a master's degree in Social Work and entered Yeshiva University obtaining a PhD in Social Work.

Garcés Carranza is a clinical social worker at the Queens County Neuropsychiatric Institute.

Garcés Carranza is a clinical social worker at Community Counseling Services.

Garcés Carranza works at the Puerto Rican Family Institute-Outpatient Psychiatric Clinic and at the Bronx-Lebanon Hospital Center.

Garcés Carranza has experience working with people from different racial and multicultural groups. He has published several articles on Social Work in Spain, Latin America and Puerto Rico. He has participated as a speaker in international Social Work conferences in Peru, Chile, Ecuador, Mexico and Colombia.

He is a member of the American Association for Psychoanalysis in Clinical Social Work (AAPCSW).

He is the author of articles and books on Social Work.

== Awards and distinctions ==
Garcés Carranza has been included in the Top Doctors of North America list in the 2018–2019 edition of the Who's Who Directories.

In 2017 he received the Award for Excellence in Social Work awarded by the International Organization of Social Work (OITS).

In 2019, he participated as a speaker and panelist at the VI Social Work Summit – Peru 2019 "Gestión del Desarrollo Sostenible", whose main conclusion was "la necesidad de repensar, desde una dimensión más integral e interdisciplinaria, nuevas formas para intervenir una realidad tan compleja y contradictoria, en donde procuramos progresivamente mejorar la calidad de vida y el bienestar social de la persona, su familia y de la sociedad".

In 2021 he was included in the important Marquis Who's Who compendium in the United States, a country where he has lived for more than forty years.

In 2022 he participated as a speaker at the master conference "Clinical Social Work" at the National University of Trujillo (UNT).

== Bibliography ==
=== Book ===
- Garcés Carranza, César Manuel (2013). Social Work in the Hospital Setting: Interventions. Trafford Publishing. ISBN 9781466993099.
- Garcés Carranza, César Manuel (2018). "La intervención del Trabajador Social en el Centro Hospitalario: Retos para la profesión". Palibrio.
- Garcés Carranza, César Manuel (2021). "The Social Worker in the Emergency Room". Goldtouch Press.
- Garcés Carranza, César Manuel (2021). "A Biographical Reflection of Being a Latin American Clinical Social Worker in the United States". Goldtouch Press.
- Garcés Carranza, César Manuel (2021). "The new Anxiety: Emotional Problems during the Pandemic of Covid-19". Goldtouch Press.
- Garcés Carranza, César Manuel (2023). "Trabajo social clínico con latinos en Nueva York, USA". Nivardo Vasni Córdova Salinas.

=== Article ===
- Garcés Carranza, César Manuel (1999). "Trabajo Social y el plan de alta del hospital". Análisis: (S. Juan Puerto Rico, 1999).
- Garcés Carranza, César Manuel (2009). "Trabajo social y la importancia de la comunicación con familiares de pacientes admitidos a la unidad de cuidados intensivos". Portularia: Revista de Trabajo Social.
- Garcés Carranza, César Manuel (2011). "Intervención del trabajador social con los familiares de pacientes con demencia en la unidad de cuidados intensivos". Portularia: Revista de Trabajo Social.
- Garcés Carranza, César Manuel (2014). "Trabajo Social y cuidado paliativo con familiares de pacientes admitidos a la unidad de cuidados intensivos". Trabajo social y salud.
- Garcés Carranza, César Manuel (2014). "Trabajo Social y competencia cultural en el sistema hospitalario". Trabajo social y salud.
