= Camille Cabral =

French politician and dermatologist

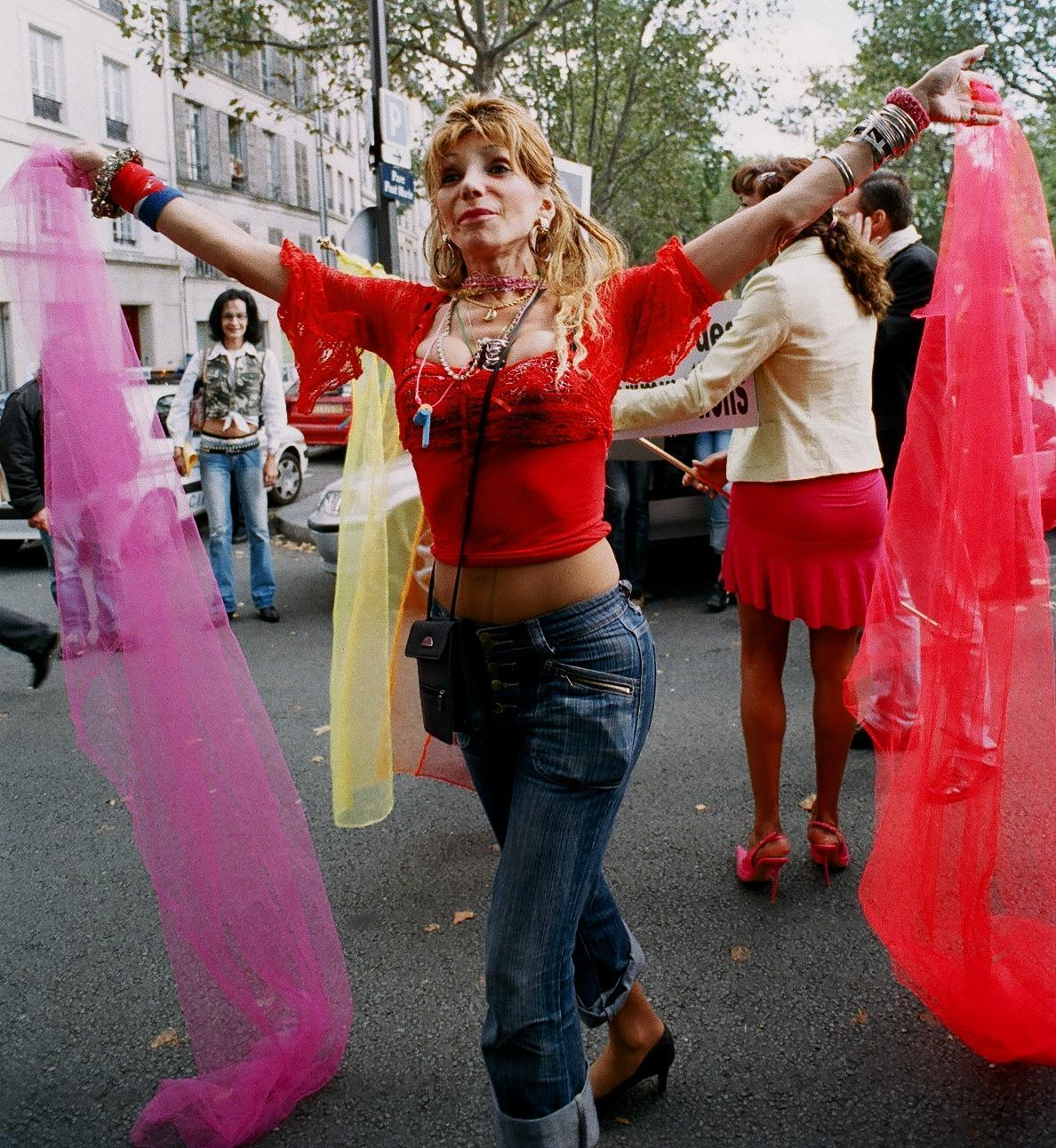
- Cabral at a demonstration for transgender people in Paris, on 1 October 2005.

Member of the 17th arrondissement of Paris
- In office 2001–2008

Personal details
- Born: 31 May 1944 (age 82) Cabaceiras, Paraíba, Brazil
- Citizenship: Brazil • France
- Party: The Greens
- Occupation: Politician and dermatologist

Camille Cabral (born 31 May 1944) is a French-Brazilian politician and dermatologist. The first trans woman to be elected in the history of the French Republic (she was on the council of the 17th arrondissement of Paris with the French Green Party), she is also the founder of the non-governmental organisation PASTT – Prévention, Action, Santé, Travail pour les Transgenres (Prevention, Action, Health and Work for transgender community). She is the subject of the 2019 documentary film MADAME.

== See also ==
- Marie Cau, first openly trans woman elected mayor in France.
