= Francisco Córdova =

Francisco Córdova may refer to:

- Pancho Córdova (Francisco Córdova, 1916–1990), Mexican actor
- Francisco Córdova (baseball), Mexican MLB left-handed starting pitcher
- Francisco Córdova (basketball), represented Puerto Rico at the 1968 Summer Olympics
- Francisco Cordoba (footballer) (born 1988), Colombian footballer
- Francisco Sebastián Córdova (born 1997), Mexican footballer

== See also ==
- Cordova (disambiguation)
