= De Córdova =

De Córdova or de Córdoba may refer to:

== People ==
=== Arts and entertainment ===
- Rudolph de Cordova (1860–1941), Jamaican–British writer and actor
- Leander de Cordova (1877–1969), Jamaican actor and film director
- Pedro de Córdoba (1881–1950), American actor
- Fred de Cordova (1910–2001), American director and producer, worked on The Tonight Show Starring Johnny Carson
- Arturo de Córdova (1908–1973), Mexican film actor

=== Military ===
- Luis de Córdova y Córdova (1706–1796), admiral, commanded the Spanish fleet in the Anglo-Spanish War
- Pedro Hernández de Córdova, Spanish soldier in the Arauco War in the 16th century
- José de Córdoba y Ramos (1732–1815), Spanish explorer and naval officer
- Alonso de Cordova y Figueroa (died 1698), Spanish soldier in Chile

=== Politics ===
- Jacob De Cordova (1808–1868), Texas politician
- Marsha de Cordova (born 1976), British Labour politician

=== Other people ===
- Pedro de Córdoba, (died 1525), Spanish missionary, author and inquisitor in Hispaniola
- Juan de Córdova (1503–1595), Spanish linguist
- Julian de Cordova (1851–1945), Jamaican–British businessman

== Other ==
- DeCordova, Texas, a city
- De Cordova Bend Dam on the Brazos River, Texas
