= Nivardo Córdova Salinas =

Peruvian writer and journalist

- Born: December 29, 1969 (age 56); Lambayeque, Peru
- Education: University of Piura
- Spouse: Liliana Guevara García
- Children: Aurora Mariajosé Córdova Guevara
- Website: nivardocordova.wordpress.com

Nivardo Vasni Córdova Salinas (born December 29, 1969, in Lambayeque) is a Peruvian writer, editor and journalist.

== Biography ==
Córdova Salinas was born in Cayalti, Chiclayo, Lambayeque in 1969. He is the son of Nivardo Vasni Córdova Tapia and Grimaneza Salinas Balarezo. He has a degree in information sciences with a mention in journalism from the University of Piura. He is currently pursuing a Master's degree in Communications at the National University of San Marcos.

Córdova has worked in journalism since 1989 in the magazine Caretas, the newspapers El Peruano, El Comercio, Expreso, La Razón, La Primera, Correo, La Industria of Trujillo and in La Industria of Chiclayo, in the newspapers El Tiempo, Nuevo Norte, Últimas Noticias and El Sol de los Andes.

Córdova has also collaborated in the magazines Clave from Peru and Mexico, Lundero in Trujillo, Ellos&Ellas from Caretas, Velaverde and Arq from Lima, Jueves from Huancayo, Punto de Vista of UDEP, Ultrarevés, Vea and La voz de la calle of Trujillo, Entrenabasket of Chiclayo, the weekly Expresión of Chiclayo, the bulletin of the San Francisco de Lima Archive and the newspaper El Progreso.

Córdova is a collaborator of Prensa Franciscana, of the Provincia Franciscana de los XII Apóstoles del Perú and a researcher in the San Francisco de Lima Archive.

Córdova has been a collaborator in the press and image area of César Manuel Garcés Carranza and editor of the website "Dr. César Garcés Carranza PhD". Córdova has edited the book "Trabajo social clínico con latinos en Nueva York, USA" by Carranza with the editorial seal of Río Hablador.

He is director of the digital newspaper Río Hablador.

He has published the cultural magazine Don Loche and is editor of the blog Rimactampu.

== Awards and honors ==
In 2013 he was awarded second place in the "Cardenal Juan Landázuri Ricketts" National Journalism Award from the Episcopal Conference of Peru (CEP) in the written press category.

In 2016 he obtained an honorable mention in the digital journalism category in the "Cardenal Juan Landázuri Ricketts" National Prize for Journalism and Social Communication, "por el aporte a la difusión del Periodismo y la cultura a través de su blog: nivardocordova.wordpress.com".

In 2019 he was awarded second place in the “Cardenal Juan Landázuri Ricketts” National Journalism Award from the Episcopal Conference of Peru (CEP) for his report and investigation "Fray José Mojica, de Hollywood al sacerdocio franciscano".

In 2022 he was awarded the "World Excellence Award 'César Vallejo'" in the journalism category of the Hispanomundial Union of Writers (UHE) in collaboration with A Thousand Minds for Mexico International upon celebrating 30 years of creation.

He has worked in teaching and university education at the César Vallejo University (UCV), at the Private University of the North (UPN), at the Lord of Sipán University (USS) and at the University of San Martín de Porres (USMP). He was a teacher and librarian at the "Virgen de la Puerta" School of the El Milagro penal establishment in Trujillo.

Córdova teaches digital journalism workshops and develops the "Proyecto Cudelio Córdova: al rescate del fotógrafo de Cayaltí" that compiles, digitizes and contextualizes the photographs of his grandfather, a prominent Peruvian of the 20th century.

He runs the blogs Rimactampu, Cudelio Córdova and Proyecto Khipu.
