= David Córdova =

Chilean footballer (born 1984)

Personal information
- Full name: David Manuel Córdova Pinto
- Date of birth: 30 March 1984 (age 42)
- Place of birth: Santiago, Chile
- Height: 1.72 m (5 ft 8 in)
- Position: Forward

Senior career*
Years	Team	Apps	(Gls)
2003–2007	Unión Española	21	(3)
2004–2005	→ Ferroviarios (loan)	–	(–)
2006	→ Trasandino (loan)	–	(–)
2008	Deportes Iquique	21	(2)
2009	Deportes Puerto Montt	23	(4)
2010	Rangers	7	(0)
2011	Magallanes	20	(0)
Total		92	(9)
- * Club domestic league appearances and goals

David Manuel Córdova Pinto (born 30 March 1984) is a Chilean former footballer.

He played for Magallanes.
