= Pedro de Córdoba =

Spanish missionary

- Born: c. 1460; Córdoba, Spain
- Died: May 4, 1521; Island of Santo Domingo
- Occupation: Spanish missionary

Pedro de Córdoba OP (c.1460 – 1521) was a Spanish missionary, author and inquisitor on the island of Hispaniola. He was first to denounce the Spanish system known as the Encomienda, which amounted to the practical enslavement of natives of the New World, for the abuses that it engendered.

== Life and career ==
He was born at Córdoba, Andalusia, southern Spain. He studied theology at the University of Salamanca and there joined the order of Dominicans.

In September 1510 he went to the Island of Hispaniola as vicar of the first band of Dominican missionaries and as the first inquisitor appointed in the New World. He was a zealous protector of the Indians and a friend and mentor of Bartolomé de las Casas.

The objective of the friars consisted in the pastoral care to the Spaniards and, especially in the evangelization of the natives. Consequently, they came in direct contact with them, especially with the "naborias" as those who were servants in the homes of the Spaniards were called. Very soon the Dominicans became aware of the bad treatment received, and the abuse committed against, the inhabitants of that island.

Confronted with such a degree of submission and oppression of the Indians, the Dominican community dedicated countless hours in meetings to study the problem in depth, until they decided to make a public denouncement of the atrocities. Once they decided on the text and wrote it down, it was signed by each one of the members of the community. Friar Pedro de Cordoba commissioned Friar Antonio Montesino to preach it at the High Mass on the Fourth Sunday of Advent which was December 21, 1511, just a little more than a year from the day of their arrival at the island.

Despite this fact, the sermon was not preserved, but only an extract which, later on, Friar Bartolome de Las Casas would incorporate in his work on the History of the Indies, where one can read: “Sunday arrived and at the time for preaching, Fr Antonio de Montesinos got up in the pulpit and took as the theme for the sermon, which was written and signed by all the other brothers, “Ego sum vox clamantis in deserto”.

The fundamental reason for the denunciations, consisted in the lack of acknowledgement of the human dignity of the Indians. And so, the questions: “Are these not persons? Do they not have rational souls?” The other arguments, like the need to evangelize the Indians and baptize them, presuppose the previous ones. It was the community of friars, therefore, who in the name of human dignity and Christian duty, could and must give the following sentence against the colonizers:

- All of you are in mortal sin; in it you live and in it you die.
- In the state you are, you cannot be saved, as your behavior is equal to a lack of faith in Jesus Christ, and you have no desire for it
- If you continue mistreating the Indians, know for sure that the sins you confess will not receive our absolution.

His book, "Doctrina cristiana para instruccion é informacion de los Indios por manera de historia", was printed in 1544 at Mexico by directions of Bishop Zumárraga. It was destined for the education of the Indians, chiefly of the Caribbean islands, and is one of the earliest books of catechism known to have been composed in America.

In 1513, Friar Pedro de Córdoba persuaded King Ferdinand II to allow the Dominicans of Hispaniola to go to the mainland to peacefully convert the natives there. Friar Antonio Montesinos led the mission with Francisco de Córdoba and a lay brother, Juan Garcés. The Dominicans set up in the Chiribichi Valley in present-day Venezuela, where they were well-received by local chieftain "Alonso", who had been baptized years before. According to the royal grant, slavers and settlers were to give the Dominicans a wide berth.

Fray Pedro founded the Santa Cruz province of the order and enjoyed the reputation of a model priest, highly respected by the clergy, the laity, and the Indians. He was the only survivor of two ship of Spaniards who were all slain by the natives. He died on Santo Domingo in 1521.

== Works ==
Among the works authored by Fray Pedro de Córdoba are:

- Doctrina cristiana para instruccion é informacion de los Indios por manera de historia.
- Various Memoriales al Rey, or Reports to the King on the social, cultural and economic condition of the Indians.
- Instrucciones.
- Sermones.

Many Cartas, or Letters, often written in collaboration with his fellow Dominican missionaries in defence of the Indians, including:

- Carta del Vice-Provincial y sacerdotes del convento de Santo Domingo, dirigida a los muy reverendos padres (April or May 1517).
- Carta de dominicos y franciscanos de las Indias a los Regentes de España (Santo Domingo, 27 May 1517).
- Carta al Rey del Padre Fr. Pedro de Córdoba, Vice-Provincial de la Orden de Santo Domingo (Santo Domingo, 28 May 1517).
- Carta del Padre Fray Pedro de Córdoba al Padre Fray Antonio Montesinos (26 September 1517).
