= Carmen Córdova =

Argentine architect

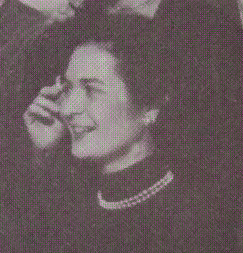
- Born: 1929; Buenos Aires, Argentina
- Died: 2011 (aged 81–82); Buenos Aires, Argentina
- Education: University of Buenos Aires
- Occupations: Architect, academic administrator
- Organization: Modern Architecture Organization
- Spouse: Horacio Baliero
- Parents: Cayetano Córdova Iturburu (father); Carmen de la Serna (mother)

Carmen Córdova (1929–2011) was an Argentine architect who was part of the Modern Architecture Organization (OAM). In 1994 she became the first woman dean of the Faculty of Architecture, Design, and Urban Planning at the University of Buenos Aires. In 2004, she received a Lifetime Achievement Award from the Fondo Nacional de las Artes.

== Biography ==
Carmen Córdova belonged to an ideologically progressive family, the daughter of writer Cayetano Córdova Iturburu and Carmen de la Serna, sister of Che Guevara's mother, Celia de la Serna. She grew up surrounded by an intellectual and cultural world, which led her to love the arts and study several of them. She dedicated 14 years of her life to dance, studying at the National Conservatory. She wrote prose, painted, and dabbled in acting. While studying painting at Emilio Pettoruti's studio, she met her future OAM colleague, partner, and husband, the architect Horacio Baliero, with whom she had three daughters. She died in Buenos Aires in 2011.

== Career ==
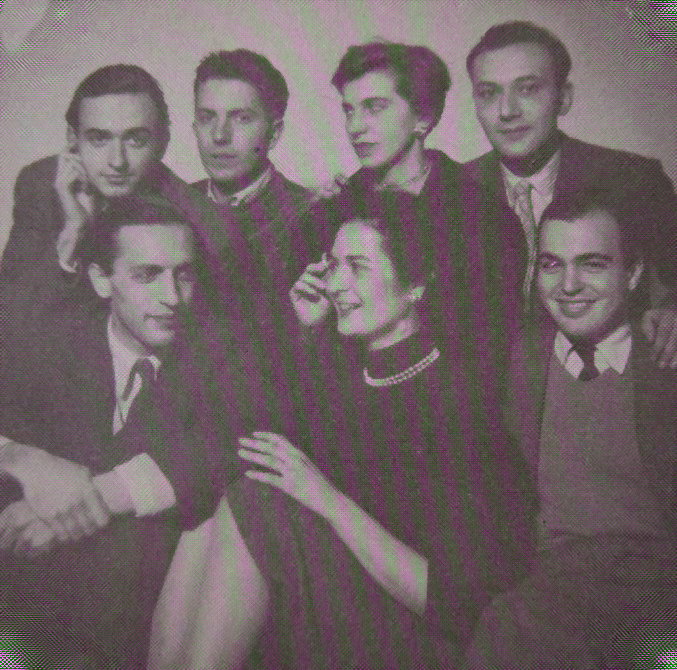
The Modern Architecture Organization (OAM)

The Modern Architecture Organization (OAM) was founded at the behest of Tomás Maldonado and Alfredo Hlito, and also included Córdova and Baliero, Jorge Bullrich, Juan Manuel Borthagaray, Alicia Cazzaniga, Gerardo Clusellas, Jorge Goldemberg, Jorge Grisetti, and Eduardo Polledo. Besides being interested in architecture, members of the group were lovers of all the arts and their joint expression. They had their headquarters in a building on Cerrito Street in Buenos Aires, which was a cradle of the city's architectural modernity. Their work in the studio of Maldonado, Hlito and Carlos Méndez Mosquera would give rise to the publishing house Nueva Visión, fundamental in the translation of modern texts into Castilian. The sculptor Enio Iommi worked on another floor, and the young students Justo Solsona, Ernesto Katzenstein, and Eduardo Bell worked in the attic.

Together with Solsona and Katzenstein, Córdova began teaching under professor Vladimiro Acosta. From this experience she learned to recognize the value of modern architecture and criticism of the movement itself, with Acosta's ideas regarding climate being fundamental.

Belonging to OAM transformed Carmen Córdova's way of understanding architecture, especially the texts of Le Corbusier and the aesthetic and architectural reference of Max Bill. This coincided with her work, together with Solsona and Katzenstein, drafting the Plan for the South District of the city of Buenos Aires, directed by Antoni Bonet.

In those years she traveled to Brazil to present the Revista Nueva Visión, in the company of Horacio Baliero. They spent six months there, getting to know the most influential architecture of the day, especially that of Oscar Niemeyer, for whom she felt a great admiration. These influences are reflected in the contest the couple won in 1961 for the Mar del Plata cemetery. This included a wing for an Israeli cemetery, which was transformed into a chapel following the military coup in 1966.

Like many OAM members, Córdova was a university professor, a post she left after the bloody action against students by the dictatorship in 1966, known as "La Noche de los Bastones Largos" (The Night of the Long Batons).

Córdova and Baliero won the competition to design the Colegio Mayor Universitario Hispano Argentino Nuestra Señora de Luján in Madrid, which led them to move there with their three daughters in 1966. They partnered with Javier Feduchi Benlliure to complete the work, which was modified in its materiality according to the climate and local technological capabilities. In 2004 the Government of Spain declared it to be a heritage building.

In 1986 she was elected academic secretary to dean Juan Manuel Borthagaray at the Faculty of Architecture, Design, and Urbanism of the University of Buenos Aires (FADU-UBA) for two terms, after which she herself was elected dean. During her term the organization of the house of studies was completely changed. Graphic Design and Industrial Design programs were created, based on electives that were dictated in architecture. In 1989 the programs Clothing and Textile Design, Landscape Design, and Image and Sound Design were added to the Faculty's offerings, the latter as a result of work shared with the architect Graciela Raponi and Córdova's passion for cinema. After almost 30 years, despite the resistance of more conservative and elitist academics and professionals, the creation of these programs proved to be a success that reflected the variety of students' interests.

In 1994 she was elected dean of the FADU unanimously, but despite that support she was unable to achieve her dream of an academic program that was closer to the ideals of the Bauhaus that she admired so much. It was a disappointing experience in political terms, causing her to resign along with her vice-dean in 1996, and led her not to want to be involved in any project or public activity in the last years of her life. In 2001 Carmen Córdova wrote the book Memorias de modernidad (Memoirs of Modernity) as a rebellious response to an unjust world that did not satisfy her and with which she totally disagreed.

== Publications ==
- "Reflexiones en 'Horacio Baliero/Ernesto Katzenstein: una arquitectura de síntesis'" in Summa (1984)
- "La síntesis dialéctica. Pasaron muchas cosas en el verano de 1923" in Ramona. Revista de artes visuales (14): 53 (2001)
- Memorias de modernidad (2001)

== Notable works ==
- Israeli Cemetery of Mar del Plata (1961)
- Colegio Mayor Argentino in Madrid (1966)
- Project of 155 residences in Centenario for the Neuquén Ministry of Public Health, with Horacio Baliero and Alberto Casares (1969)
