= Delia Córdova =

Peruvian volleyball player

Personal information
- Full name: Delia Córdova Uribe (-Caceres)
- Born: 30 January 1953; Lima, Peru
- Died: 1 January 2016 (aged 62); Lima, Peru
- Height: 1.68 m (5 ft 6 in)

Volleyball information
- Number: 7

National team
1973–1979	Peru
Honours
Women's volleyball
Representing Peru
Pan American Games
Silver medal – second place	1975 Mexico City	Team
Silver medal – second place	1979 Caguas	Team
CSV South American Championship
Gold medal – first place	1973 Bucaramanga
Gold medal – first place	1979 Rosario

Delia Córdova (30 January 1953 – 1 January 2016) was a Peruvian volleyball player. Córdova competed in the women's tournament at the 1976 Summer Olympics in Montreal, where she finished in seventh place. Córdova won silver medals at the 1975 and 1979 Pan American Games.

== Personal life and death ==
Córdova was born in Lima, Peru. She died on 1 January 2016, in Lima.
