= Jorge Cordova =

Jorge Cordova is the name of:

- Jorge Córdova (1822–1862), military officer and constitutional President of Bolivia (1855–1857)
- Jorge Luis Córdova (1907–1994), Puerto Rico's eleventh Resident Commissioner, Associate Justice of the Supreme Court of Puerto Rico, and lawyer
- Jorge Cordova (American football) (born 1981), college and National Football League linebacker
- Jorge Córdova (footballer), Chilean footballer
