= Prévention action santé travail pour les transgenres =

French transgender rights organization

PASTT
- Formation: 1992
- Founder: Camille Cabral
- Type: Association loi de 1901
- Headquarters: 3 bis, rue cité d’Hauteville, 10th arrondissement, Paris
- Services: HIV prevention, social work
- Fields: Transgender rights
- Director: Inès Messaoudi
- Website: https://www.associationpastt.com

PASTT (Prévention action santé travail pour les transgenres / Prevention Action Health Work for Transgender People) is a Parisian transgender self-advocacy group founded in 1992 by Camille Cabral.

== History ==
PASTT was founded in 1992 by the Franco-Brazilian doctor Camille Cabral, who had just been forced out of her job by transphobic discrimination after her gender transition. Initially hosted by the HIV/AIDS organization AIDES, it became fully independent in 1997. Inspired by the struggles of Cabral's patients, many of whom were transgender migrant sex workers, the founding goal of PASTT was to provide a safe space for transgender women, particularly those on the margins of society, to receive holistic support services, HIV treatment, and access to a community of their peers.

== Activities ==
=== Service Provision ===
Services provided by PASTT include HIV prevention, rehousing aid, legal aid, prison outreach, and personalized support services to help transgender people protect their rights in social and administrative settings.

=== Advocacy ===
Aside from directly supporting sex workers, PASTT issues public demands for the political rights of the populations it serves. In particular, PASTT has opposed the French requirement that people seeking gender-affirming surgery must choose from a list of approved surgeons, advocating instead for the freedom to choose one's own surgeon. It also joined the November 2002 sex worker protests against the loi d'orientation et de programmation pour la sécurité intérieure.
