= Cordova High School =

Cordova High School can refer to:

- Cordova High School (Alabama), Cordova, Alabama
- Cordova High School (California)
- Cordova High School (Tennessee)
- Cordova Junior/Senior High School (Cordova, Alaska)
