= Cordova Airport =

Cordova Airport may refer to:

- Cordova Municipal Airport in Cordova, Alaska, United States (IATA: CKU)
- Merle K. (Mudhole) Smith Airport in Cordova, Alaska, United States (IATA: CDV)
- José María Córdova International Airport in Medellín, Colombia (IATA: MDE)

== See also ==
- Cordoba Airport
