= University of Cordoba =

The term University of Córdoba or Cordoba could refer to the following:

- National University of Córdoba (Argentina)
- University of Cordoba (Colombia)
- University of Córdoba (Spain)
- Workers' University of Córdoba (Spain)
- Cordoba Private University (Syria)
- Cordoba University (United States)
