= Cayalti District =

Coordinates: 6.8868°S 79.5665°W

Cayalti
- District
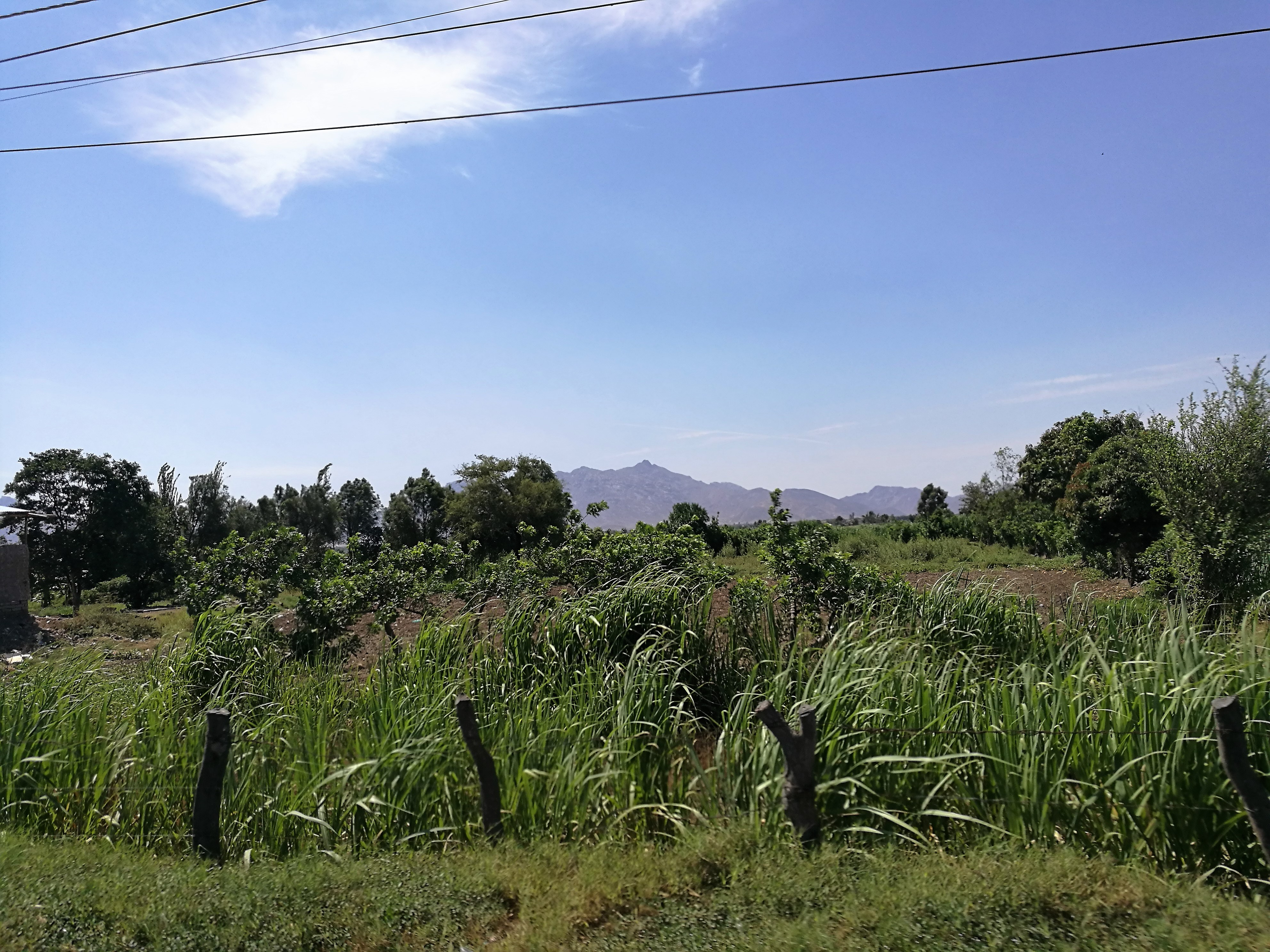
- Interactive map of Cayalti
- Country: Peru
- Region: Lambayeque
- Province: Chiclayo
- Founded: January 29, 1998
- Capital: Cayalti

Government
  - Mayor: Carlos Alberto Arvañil Saldaña

Area
  - Total: 162.86 km^{2} (62.88 sq mi)
- Elevation: 78 m (256 ft)

Population (2005 census)
  - Total: 17,224
  - Density: 105.76/km^{2} (273.92/sq mi)
- Time zone: UTC-5 (PET)
- UBIGEO: 140116

Cayalti District is one of twenty districts of the province Chiclayo in Peru.

== Climate ==
Climate data for Cayalti, elevation 90 m (300 ft), (1991–2020)
Month	Jan	Feb	Mar	Apr	May	Jun	Jul	Aug	Sep	Oct	Nov	Dec	Year
Mean daily maximum °C (°F)	33.5 (92.3)	34.1 (93.4)	34.1 (93.4)	32.8 (91.0)	30.8 (87.4)	28.5 (83.3)	27.5 (81.5)	27.5 (81.5)	28.3 (82.9)	29.1 (84.4)	30.2 (86.4)	31.7 (89.1)	30.7 (87.2)
Mean daily minimum °C (°F)	19.3 (66.7)	20.5 (68.9)	20.5 (68.9)	18.9 (66.0)	17.1 (62.8)	15.4 (59.7)	14.1 (57.4)	14.0 (57.2)	14.6 (58.3)	15.2 (59.4)	15.6 (60.1)	17.6 (63.7)	16.9 (62.4)
Average precipitation mm (inches)	5.5 (0.22)	24.2 (0.95)	24.8 (0.98)	8.1 (0.32)	1.4 (0.06)	0.5 (0.02)	0.5 (0.02)	0.3 (0.01)	1.5 (0.06)	2.4 (0.09)	3.3 (0.13)	5.1 (0.20)	77.6 (3.06)
Source: National Meteorology and Hydrology Service of Peru

== See also ==
- Vanesa Campos
