= Alfredo Córdoba =

Mexican footballer (1925–2019)

Personal information
- Full name: Alfredo Córdoba Alcala
- Date of birth: 13 May 1925
- Place of birth: Guadalajara, Mexico
- Date of death: 7 September 2019 (aged 94)
- Place of death: Mexico City
- Position: Midfielder

International career
Years	Team	Apps	(Gls)
- Mexico

Alfredo Córdoba Alcala (13 May 1925 – 7 September 2019) was a Mexican footballer. He competed in the men's tournament at the 1948 Summer Olympics.
