= Thierry Schaffauser =

French trade unionist and pornographic actor

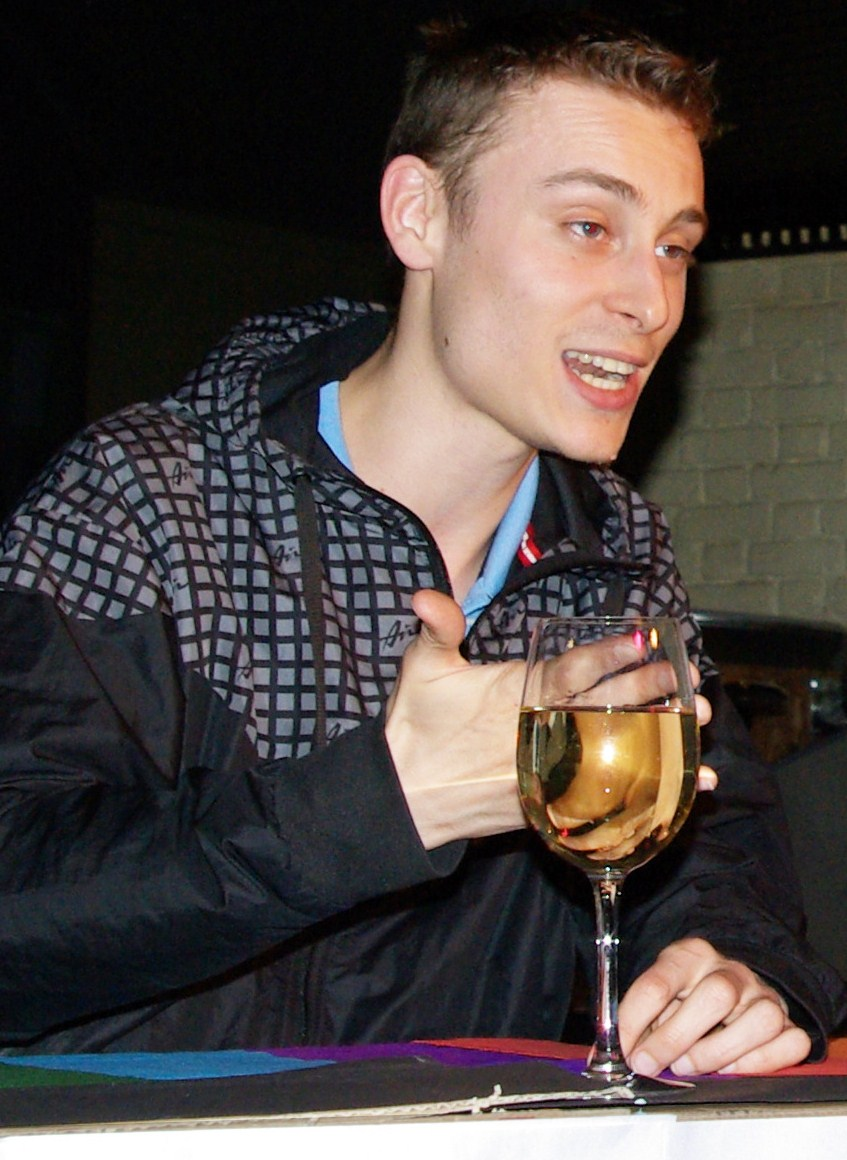
Thierry Schaffauser speaking at Croydon Area Gay Society, South London, May 2010

Thierry Schaffauser is a French sex worker, social activist, writer, and actor.

== Early life ==
Schaffauser was born 1982 in Suresnes, a commune in the western suburbs of Paris, France.

== Social activism ==
Schaffauser's introduction to activism was as a member of ACT UP-Paris, the French chapter of the international ACT UP movement. In 2006, Schaffauser co-founded Les Putes, a Paris-based group defending sex workers' rights, and, since 8 December 2009, he has been a board member – responsible for international relations – of STRASS, the French sex workers trade union. In 2010, Schaffauser was the president of the GMB-IUSW, Adult Entertainment branch.

=== Out East ===
As part of community group Out East, Schaffauser was one of the organizers of Hackney Pride, a 2010 LGBT (lesbian, gay, bisexual, and transgender) event that attracted 1,000 people in East London, UK. Attendees celebrated all sexualities, genders, races, and religions, marching for two hours before gathering for speeches inside a church located in the Shoreditch district of the London Borough of Hackney. Schaffauser spoke with the Hackney Gazette afterward, stating: "I'm so proud of Hackney."

The following year, homophobic stickers appeared in areas of eastern London, including Hackney, and by the end of March 2011, the vast majority were found in the London Borough of Tower Hamlets. The dissemination of the stickers was described by activists as a "hate campaign", and an apolitical parade, titled "East End Gay Pride", was planned by a group of friends as a response. The event had been scheduled for April, but in March 2011, Schaffauser, as chair of Out East, published an open letter on the Pink News website calling for the cancellation of East End Gay Pride. The appeal was supported by Terry Stewart of the Hackney Community Engagement Board, Denis Fernando of Unite Against Fascism, and the Greater London Association of Trade Union Councils. Writing on behalf of Out East—a member of Rainbow Hamlets and the Tower Hamlets LGBT Forum—Schaffauser raised several concerns, including the potential for Islamophobia, alleged links between some organizers and the English Defence League, and the need for a broader political response.

By July 2011, Rainbow Hamlets continued to intensively engage with the East London Mosque & London Muslim Centre (ELM), while Out East introduced weekly meetings in mid-2011 to provide a forum in which people could discuss what they would like to occur as a response. An event was eventually organized, and, on 24 September, the East London Pride march set off from Hackney Town Hall. In what was a much smaller event than Hackney Pride, participants walked to the Oxford House building on Hackney Road, where the mayor of Tower Hamlets, Lutfur Rahman, a British-Asian Muslim, addressed the crowd: "I want you to be in no doubt I will fight to ensure there is respect for lesbian, gay, bisexual and transgender culture and rights in the same way I will for all communities."

== Writing and acting ==
Schaffauser co-authored Fières d'être putes (with Maîtresse Nikita, 2007), and wrote six articles on sex work for the Guardian in the first half of 2010, including a piece titled "Time for porn stars to self-organise". He also appeared in a few pornographic films, produced by Eurocreme and Triga Films, and was the winner of an Erotic Award in 2010. In 2014 Schaffauser published Les luttes des putes with Paris-based publishers éditions La Fabrique.

== Personal life ==
In September 2010, during the organization of Hackney Pride, Schaffauser was a resident of the London Fields district of East London, located in the Hackney borough of England, UK. In 2011, Schaffauser continued his involvement with East London LGBT issues.
