= Cordova Township =

Cordova Township may refer to the following townships in the United States:

- Cordova Township, Rock Island County, Illinois
- Cordova Township, Le Sueur County, Minnesota
