= Aquiles Córdova Morán =

Mexican political leader

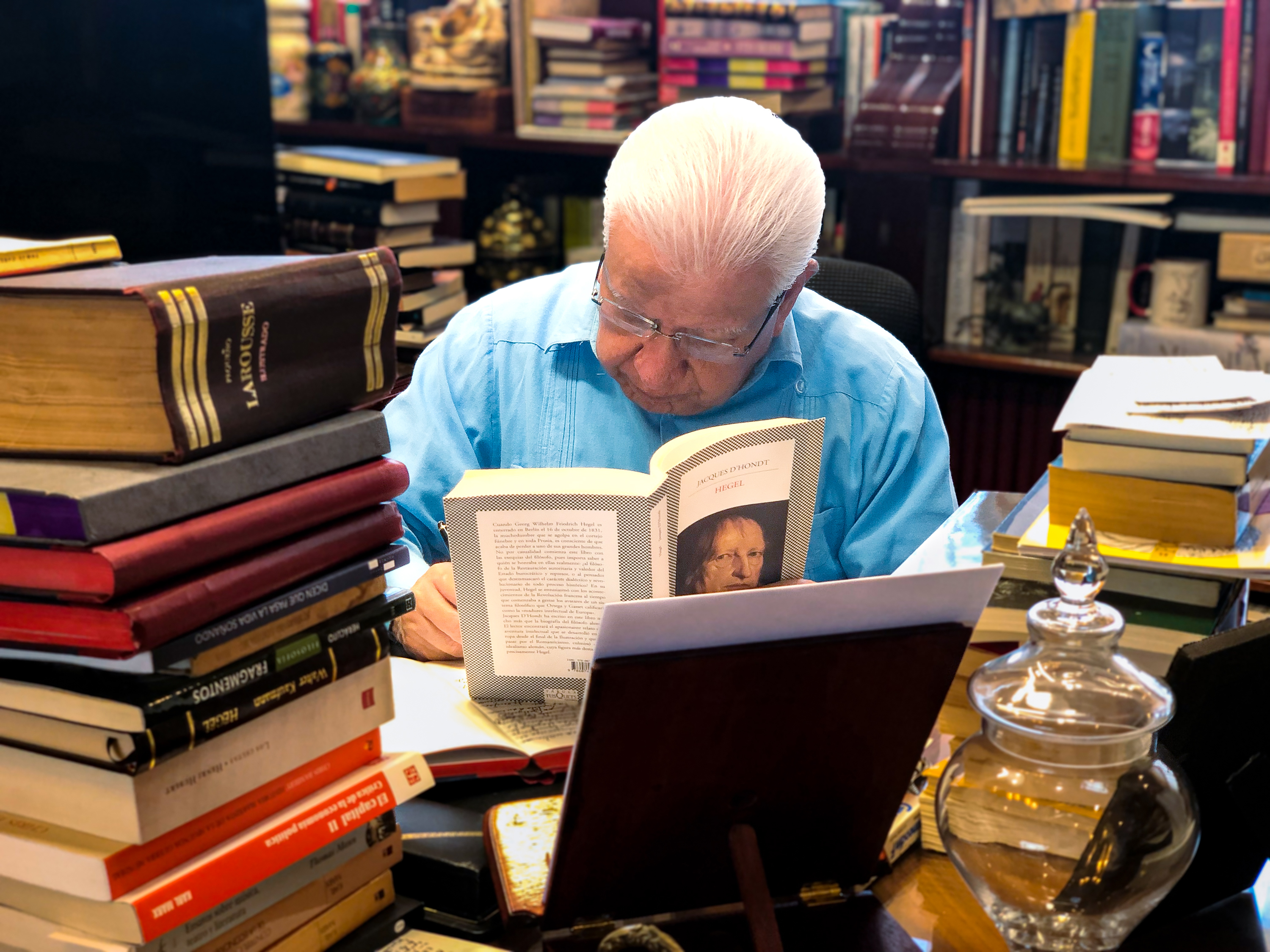
Aquiles Córdova Morán in 2019

Aquiles Córdova Morán (born 1941) is a Mexican political leader. Since 1974, when he founded the organization, he has been the general secretary of the National Torch Movement (Antorcha Campesina). a social organization created by a group of middle class people. He was born in Tecomatlán, Puebla, and is an agronomist by profession, with a degree from Chapingo Autonomous University.

== Early life and education ==
Córdova Morán studied at the National School of Agriculture in Chapingo (which became Chapingo Autonomous University in 1978) and graduated in 1967 as an agronomist. He later worked at the Mexican Coffee Institute (INMECAFE) and the Secretariat of Agriculture and Water Resources (SARH). In 1972 he returned to Chapingo as a professor, participating in the drive for the university's autonomy. He subsequently held the post of "sociocultural vice-rector".

== Career ==
=== Founding and leadership of Antorcha Campesina ===
In 1974, Córdova Morán founded Antorcha Campesina in Tecomatlán, initially with a few dozen campesinos and agronomists. He subsequently served as the organization's general secretary.

=== Political activity and alliances ===
Antorcha aligned with the Institutional Revolutionary Party (PRI) during the 1980s, formalising an affiliation by the late 1980s as part of its strategy to gain influence in municipal and state politics. In a 2016 interview, Córdova Morán signalled a rupture with the PRI and openness to forming an independent party to channel the movement's electoral strength.

In 2023, Córdova Morán published a book titled De la esperanza a la decepción ("From Hope to Disappointment"). The book compiles the author's comments, articles, and talks about President Andrés Manuel López Obrador.

== Investigations and controversies ==
In 2020, Mexico's Financial Intelligence Unit (UIF) froze accounts linked to Antorcha Campesina and its leaders in Puebla and the State of Mexico, citing large cash operations and transfers of unknown origin.
