= Córdoba, Nariño =

Coordinates: 0.855°N 77.5211°W

- Municipality and town
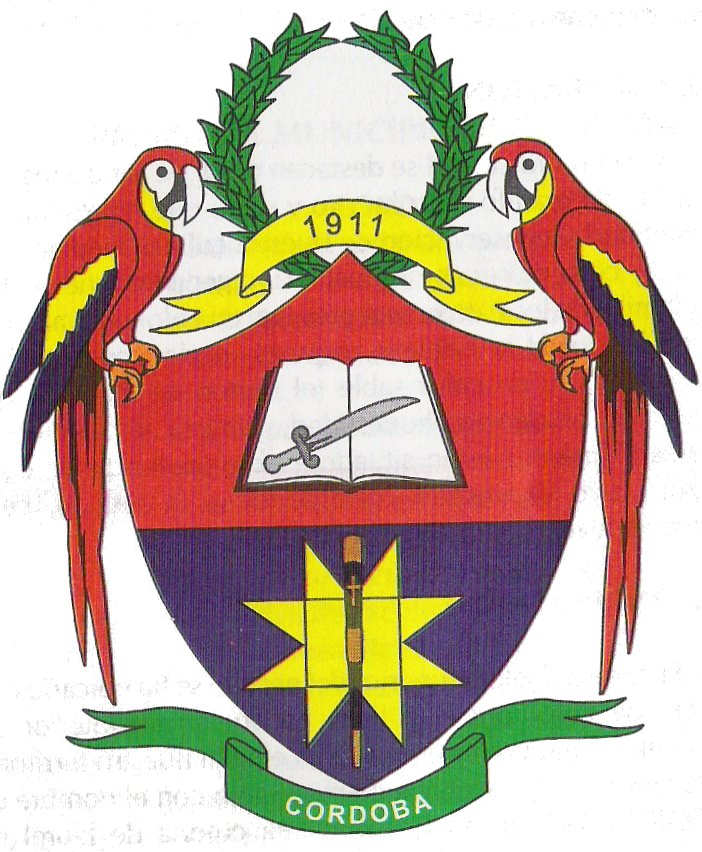
- Flag Coat of arms

- Location of the municipality and town of Córdoba, Nariño in the Nariño Department of Colombia.
- Country: Colombia
- Department: Nariño Department

Area
  - Total: 67 km^{2} (26 sq mi)

Population (Census 2018)
  - Total: 14,827
  - Density: 220/km^{2} (570/sq mi)
- Time zone: UTC-5 (Colombia Standard Time)

Córdoba is a town and municipality in the Nariño Department of Colombia.
