= Acceptess-T =

French LGBTQ+ rights advocacy organization

- Founders: Giovanna Rincon and Chris Valle
- Types: Association loi de 1901
- Purpose: Defense of transgender rights
- Headquarters: 88, rue Philippe-de-Girard, Paris
- Country: France
- Area served: France
- Coordinates: 48°53′21″N 2°21′38″E
- Fields: LGBT rights, transgender rights, social action
- Directors: Aum Neko
- Website: www.acceptess-t.com

Acceptess-T is a French self-advocacy organization, founded in 2010 by Giovanna Rincon. Based in Paris, France, it aims to offer a range of activities and service to help the most vulnerable transgender people, such as migrants and people involved in sex work.

== Objectives ==
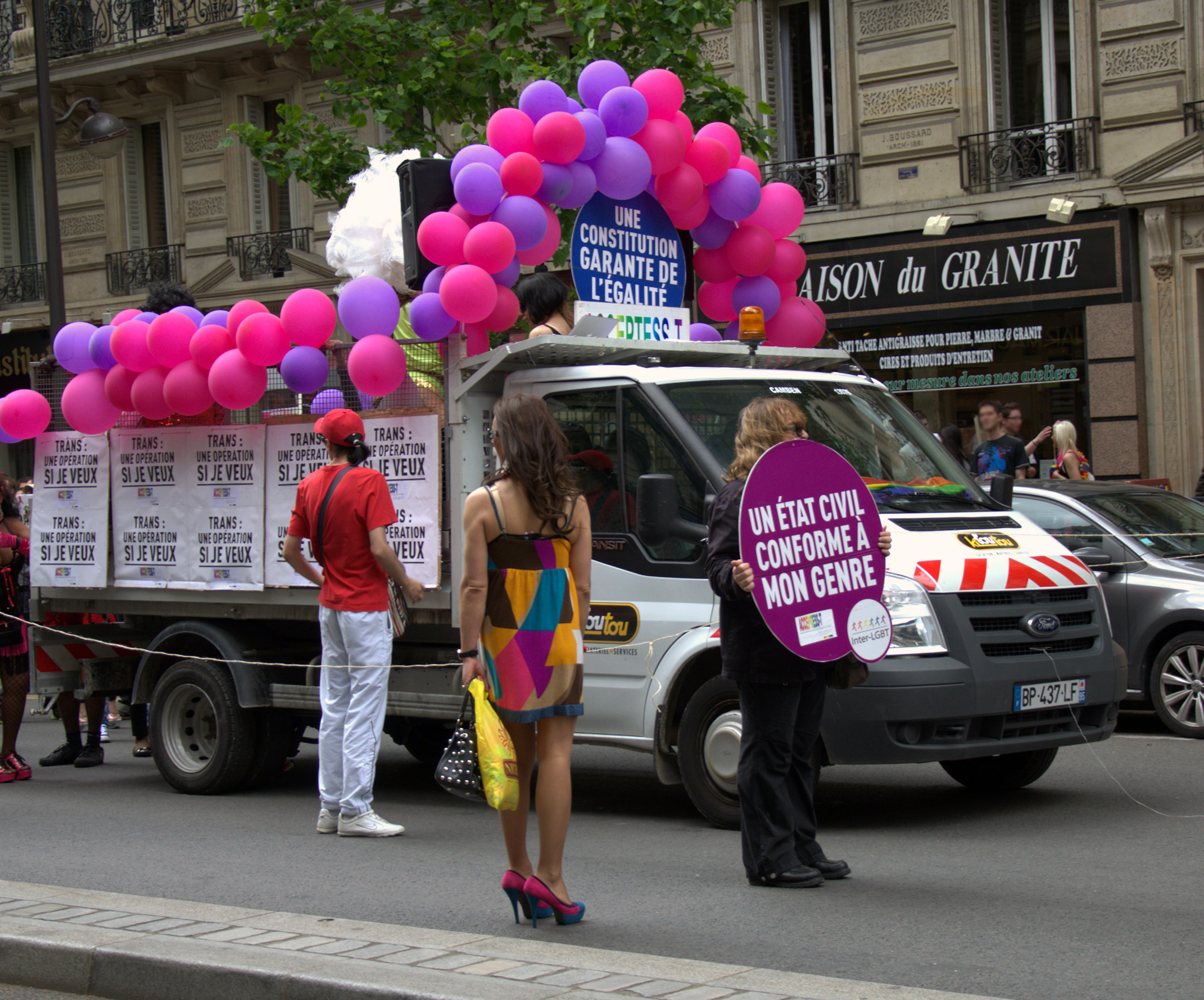
Acceptess-T during the Paris Pride parade in 2013

The organization was founded on June 26, 2010, by Giovanna Rincon and Chris Valle.

The organization aims to fight all forms of exclusion and discrimination (mistreatment, violence, and abuse) based on gender identity and its expressions against transgender people. Their goal is to create a welcoming place, where people can find information and services to promote the recognition of transgender rights in society and, on a bigger scale, human rights and fundamental freedoms for all.

The organization's work includes the prevention of sexually transmitted diseases (HIV and hepatitis) by offering information workshops or trainings, with or without help from other institutions or organizations. Additionally, the organisation facilitates access to social and medical services for people engaged in sex work, consenting or not, to promote access to information, training, work, public services and culture.

Acceptess-T also promotes sports activities to encourage health and self-esteem in transgender people.

== Activities ==
The organization's name is an acronym, standing for "Concrete Action regrouping Education, Prevention, Work, Equality, Health, Sports for trans people" (French: Actions Concrètes Conciliant Éducation, Prévention, Travail, Égalité, Santé, Sports pour les personnes Trans).

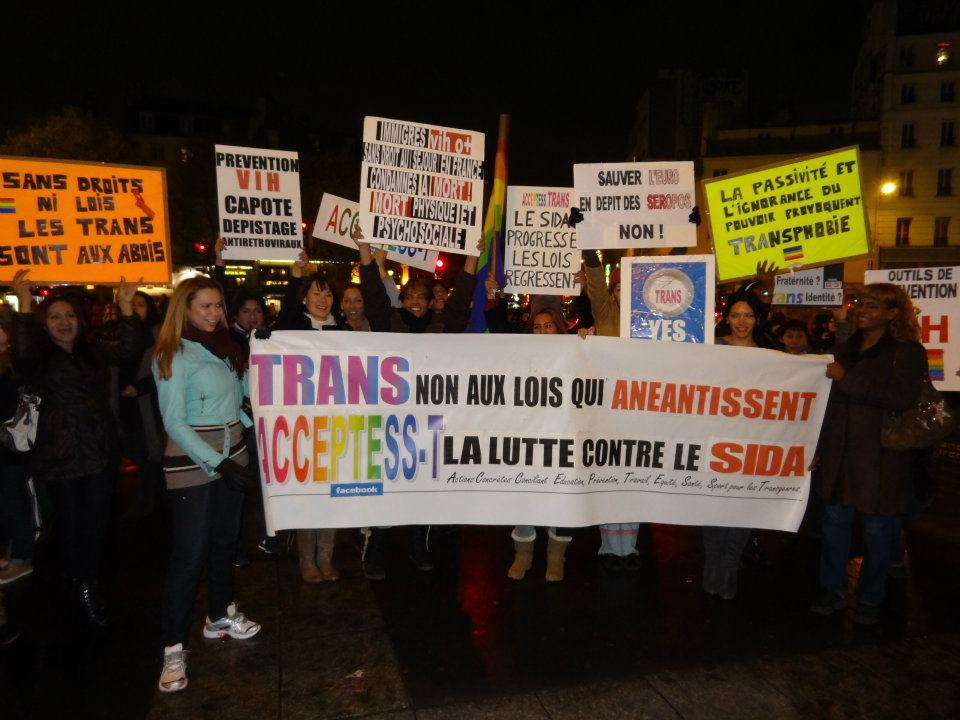
"No to the laws wiping out the fight against AIDS": Acceptess-T during World AIDS day in Paris, 2011

=== Social support ===
The organization's social workers, with the help of other social workers (cultural intermediaries, healthcare workers and volunteers), aim to follow-up on beneficiaries, redirecting them to other services where necessary.

During the COVID-19 pandemic, the organization put in place a help fund (FAST) for trans people in need, as well as food and medical kits distributions. The organization also raised concerns about the danger posed to trans people by identity verification linked to the French Passe sanitaire français.

=== Legal support ===
Following the 2018 murder of Vanesa Campos in Bois de Boulogne, the organization created a legal service with lawyers helping sex workers file complaints when falling victim to violence. The organization also created a phone line for sex workers subjected to violence to help accompany them from the moment of the aggression and during all steps of the process: getting medical and/or psychological care, looking for a lawyer, and following up on the case until an eventual trial.

=== Healthcare ===
Acceptess-T offers psychological support for people living with HIV or other illnesses (Hepatitis B, hepatitis C, tuberculosis, sexually transmitted infections) suffering from psychological issues, through advice on emotional and sexual life for couples.

Acceptess-T holds seminars promoting information and awareness about sexual health issues and world health, access to care and treatment, and preventive behaviors. A daily distribution of condoms, lube, and other protection items is put in place by the organization. They also promote various types of screening, especially for HIV and sexually transmitted diseases, through a rapid diagnostic test offered every month.

=== Awareness raising ===
Acceptess-T is regularly involved with social worker schools, welcoming local students, and organizes many events on HIV and the defense of transgender and sex worker rights. Members of the organization were invited to meetings with healthcare and social healthcare teams, such as in studies conducted with the Bichat–Claude Bernard Hospital.

=== Support to incarcerated trans people ===
The organization works with the Fleury-Mérogis prison to maintain a connection with incarcerated transgender people, notably through regular exchange of messages and phone communication. On the 2019 International Day Against Homophobia, Biphobia and Transphobia, the organization denounced the conditions of detention of trans people, citing the placement of trans women in men's prisons.

It also helps the detained to prepare their own reintegration into society in coordination with prison services and social workers from the prison administration.

=== Sports ===
Since its creation, Acceptess-T has worked to promote physical activities as tools against discrimination. It is particularly visible in activities like swimming.

The organization's project, SporTrans Citoyenneté was presented the 2015 edition of the Refuge/Randstad Institute award by then-Minister of Justice of France Christiane Taubira for initiatives against homophobia and transphobia.

In 2018, Acceptess-T denounced its exclusion from the conference on transgender people in sports during the organization of the 2018 Gay Games.
