= Syndicat du travail sexuel =

Trade union of France

- Abbreviation: STRASS
- Formation: 20 March 2009; 17 years ago
- Founded at: European conference on prostitution, Paris
- Legal status: Syndicate
- Purpose: Defending the collective, professional and moral interests of sex workers. Fighting for the recognition of sex work.
- Headquarters: 39 bis Boulevard Barbès, Paris
- Location: France
- Members: 500
- General secretary: Mylène Juste
- International relations: Thierry Schaffauser
- Affiliations: International Committee for the Rights of Sex Workers in Europe; Global Network of Sex Work Projects
- Revenue: Membership fees
- Website: www.strass-syndicat.org

The Syndicat du travail sexuel (STRASS) (Union of sexual work) is an association in France that defends the rights of sex workers, mainly prostitutes but also pornographic actors and phone sex operators. The association was formed on 20 March 2009 during the assises de la prostitution, held at the Odéon-Théâtre de l'Europe, Paris. It is operated as a self-managed syndicate.

== Objectives ==
The syndicate's initial main priority, according to Malika Amaouche, member of the collective Droits et prostitution and coordinator of the assises de la prostitution in 2009, was the repeal of the law on internal security (2003), which prohibited passive soliciting.

It also aims to fight against discrimination and marginalisation faced by sex workers by claiming professional status to ensure their social protection and benefits.

The syndicate also seeks to allow sex workers to speak in the public debate about their professional activity, according to its treasurer Mistress Nikita.

=== Client criminalisation ===
STRASS took a stand against the draft law criminalising clients of prostitutes, and organised a demonstration on 4 December 2013, which about 200 prostitutes attended. The general secretary since June 2011, Morgane Merteuil had written in advance: "We are pro-sex, pro-porn, pro-whores, and for the freedom to wear the veil", while deeming the draft law abject, anti-feminist and the "Manifesto of the 343 bastards".

On 5 June 2017, a priority issue of constitutionality (QPC) was filed by STRASS and eight other associations (including Médecins du Monde) and five sex workers, against the law aimed at penalising clients of prostitution. According to their lawyer Patrice Spinosi : "Our objective is to show that the law that was supposed to protect prostitutes more effectively did not fulfil its objectives, on the contrary, it is counterproductive". The case was initially heard by the Constitutional Council, who transferred the proceeding to the Conseil d'État in November 2018. However, the Conseil d'État validated the law as being constitutional on 1 February 2019.

== Health ==
In 2017, STRASS announces the setting up of a mutual for prostitutes in partnership with the Mutuelle de Prévoyance interprofessionnelle. The latter stated: "we who advocate the values of the fight against exclusion and rejection of discrimination, are delighted".
