= Dixie (disambiguation) =

Dixie is a nickname for the southeastern United States.

Dixie may also refer to:

== Places ==
=== United States ===
- Dixie, Brooks County, Georgia, an unincorporated community
- Dixie, Newton County, Georgia, an unincorporated community
- Dixie, Elmore County, Idaho, an unincorporated community
- Dixie, Idaho County, Idaho, an unincorporated community
- Dixie, Henderson County, Kentucky, an unincorporated community
- Dixie, Whitley County, Kentucky, an unincorporated community
- Dixie, Louisiana, an unincorporated community
- Dixie, Missouri, an unincorporated community
- Dixie, Oregon (disambiguation)
- Dixie, Fluvanna County, Virginia, an unincorporated community
- Dixie, Mathews County, Virginia, an unincorporated community
- Dixie, Washington, a census-designated place
- Dixie, Harrison County, West Virginia, an unincorporated community
- Dixie, Nicholas County, West Virginia, an unincorporated community
- Dixie County, Florida
- Dixie Creek, a tributary of Red Clover and Indian Creek, California
- Dixie Hills, Nevada, a mountain range
- Dixie Mountain, a peak near Frenchman Lake, California
- Dixie Valley, a basin in Nevada
- Dixie (Utah), a nickname for the southwestern region of Utah

=== Elsewhere ===
- Dixie, Queensland, Australia
- Dixie, Mississauga, Ontario, Canada, a neighbourhood

== Arts and entertainment ==
- Dixie, a character in Pixie and Dixie and Mr. Jinks
- Dixie, a character in the 1987 American buddy cop action movie Lethal Weapon
- "Dixie" (song), a well-known song born of the American minstrel tradition
- Dixie (album), album by Avail
- Dixie (film), a Bing Crosby musical
- Dixie (Pee-wee's Playhouse), a taxi-cab driver character
- Dixie Kong, a character from the Donkey Kong series
- Dixie (board wargame), an alternate-history game by SPI
- Dixie (card game), a card game produced by Columbia Games, Inc.

== Education ==
- Dixie Grammar School, Market Bosworth, Leicestershire, England
- Dixie Hollins High School, St. Petersburg, Florida, U.S.
- Dixie School District, California, U.S.
- Dixie Technical College, St. George, Utah, U.S.
- Tennessee Technological University (or University of Dixie), Cookeville, Tennessee, U.S.
- Utah Tech University (formerly Dixie State University), St. George, Utah, U.S.

== Transportation ==
- Dixie GO Station, a GO Transit railway station in Mississauga, Ontario, Canada
- Dixie Highway, a former highway between Chicago and Miami
- Dixie Overland Highway, an American auto trail
- Dixie station (MiWay), a bus station in Mississauga, Ontario, Canada
- Dixie USFS Airport, a public-use U.S. Forest Service airport near Dixie, Idaho County, Idaho
- New Zealand DX class locomotive or Dixie, a series of diesel-electric locomotives
- Dixie, the private railroad car of Henry H. Rogers, builder of the Virginian Railway

== Maritime vessels ==
- USS Dixie (1893), an auxiliary cruiser and later a destroyer tender
- Dixie-class destroyer tender, a World War II ship class
  - USS Dixie (AD-14), lead ship of the class
- USS Dixie III (SP-701), a patrol boat
- Dixie (sternwheeler)

== Sports ==
- Dixie Athletic Conference, a short-lived high school conference in southern Indiana
- Dixie Bowl, a college football bowl game held following the 1947 and 1948 seasons
- Dixie Conference, three collegiate athletic leagues in the United States
- Dixie League (disambiguation), several American minor league baseball leagues
- Dixie Motor Speedway, a racetrack near Birch Run, Michigan
- Dixie Stakes, a horse race at Pimlico Race Course

== Other uses ==
- Dixie (name), a list of people and characters with the given name, nickname or surname
- Dixie baronets, a title in the Baronetage of England from 1660 to 1975
- DIXIE, an obsolete protocol for accessing X.500 directory services
- Dixie Brewing Company, a New Orleans–based brewery that produces Dixie Beer
- Dixie Cap, a nickname for the American variant of the sailor cap
- Dixie Center for the Arts, a venue in Ruston, Louisiana
- Dixie Cup, a brand name of disposable paper cups
- Dixie Fire, a 2021 wildfire in California
- Dixie High School (disambiguation)
- Dixie Travel Plaza or Dixie Truck Stop, McLean, Illinois
- Operation Dixie, a post–World War II campaign to unionize industry in the southern United States
- Radio Free Dixie, Cuban radio program, targeted towards the continental United States

== See also ==
- Dixi (disambiguation)
- Dixieland (disambiguation)
- Little Dixie (disambiguation)
- DIXY, a Russian grocery chain
- Dixy Chicken, a Pakistani halal fast-food chain
