= Dixieland (disambiguation) =

Dixieland jazz is a traditional style of jazz music.

Dixieland may also refer to:

- An alternative rendering of Dixie, a nickname for the Southern United States, particularly states that comprised the Confederate States of America
- Dixieland (film), a 2015 American crime drama film
- Dixieland, California, an unincorporated community in Imperial County, California
- Dixieland Historic District, a historic district in Lakeland, Florida
- Dixieland Jazz (TV series), a Canadian music TV series which aired in 1954
- Dixieland Plus, the 1977 debut album by Harry Connick Jr.
- Dixieland (train), a 1950s incarnation of a Chicago to Miami passenger train
- "Dixieland" (composition), a 1960 Dixieland jazz composition by Tex Grant
- Dixie Land (film), a 2015 Ukrainian documentary film
- "Dixie" (song), an American folk song from 1859 also known as "Dixie's Land"

== See also ==
- Dixie (disambiguation)
