= Dixey =

Dixey is a surname. Notable people with the name include:

- Arthur Dixey (1889–1954), British Member of Parliament of the Conservative Party
- Frank Dixey KCMG FRS (1892–1982) British hydrologist and geologist
- Frederick Augustus Dixey (1855–1935), English entomologist
- Henry E. Dixey (1859–1943), American actor and theatre producer
- Mary Dixey (born 1961), American former rugby union player
- Neville Dixey (1881–1947), British Liberal Party politician
- Paul Dixey (born 1987), former English professional cricketer
- Phyllis Dixey (1914–1964), English singer, dancer and impresario
- Richard Dixey (born 1956), English former footballer

== See also ==
- Mount Dixey, a mountain in Antarctica
- Dixie (name)
- Dixy (disambiguation)
