= Dixie, West Virginia =

Dixie, West Virginia may refer to:

- Dixie, Harrison County, West Virginia, an unincorporated community
- Dixie, Nicholas County, West Virginia, a census-designated place (CDP) in Fayette and Nicholas counties
