= Persinger =

Persinger may refer to:

== Places ==
- Persinger, West Virginia, an unincorporated community in Nicholas County, West Virginia, United States
- Persinger House is a historic home located at Covington, Alleghany County, Virginia. The original section was built about 1757, and enlarged in 1888.
- Persinger Creek, a stream in the U.S. state of West Virginia

== People ==
- Greg Persinger (born 1978), American curler
- Holt Persinger, American politician from Georgia
- Louis Persinger (1887–1966), American violinist and pianist
- Michael Persinger (1945–2018), cognitive neuroscience researcher and university professor with over 200 peer-reviewed publications
- Mildred Persinger (born in Roanoke, Virginia, 1918–2018), American feminist and international activist for non-governmental organizations (NGO)
- Raymond Persinger (born 1959), American artist. Best known for his large bronze sculptures, Persinger runs the sculpture program at the Laguna College of Art and Design (LCAD).
- Vicky Persinger (born 1992), American curler
