= Dixie (name) =

Dixie is a unisex given name, nickname or stage name, and surname. It may refer to:

== People with the surname ==
- Christine Dixie (born 1966), South African printmaker
- Lady Florence Dixie (1855–1905), Scottish traveller, war correspondent, writer and feminist
- Mark Dixie, a chef convicted of a 2005 murder
- Wolstan Dixie (1524 or 1525–1594), English merchant and administrator, Lord Mayor of London in 1585
- Sir Wolstan Dixie of Appleby Magna (1576–1650), High Sheriff of Leicestershire, Member of Parliament and founder of the Dixie Grammar School, great-nephew of the above

== People with the given name ==
- Dixie Browning (1930–2024), American artist and romance novelist
- Dixie Bull (fl. 1631–1632), English sea captain and pirate
- Dixie Carter (1939–2010), American stage and television actress
- Dixie Carter (wrestling), American former promoter and businesswoman
- Dixie D'Amelio (born 2001), American social media personality and singer, also known by the stage name Dixie
- Dixie Egerickx (born 2005), British actress
- Dixie Bibb Graves (1882–1965), wife of Alabama Governor Bibb Graves and first female United States Senator from Alabama
- Dixie Haygood (1861–1915), American stage magician
- Dixie L. Leavitt (1929–2026), American entrepreneur and politician
- Dixie Selden (1868–1935), American painter
- Dixie Tan (1935–2014), Singaporean cardiologist and politician
- Dixie Willis (born 1941), Australian middle-distance runner

== People with the nickname or stage name ==
- Dixie Brown, English boxer Anthony George Charles (1900–1957)
- Dixie Davis (1905–1969), American lawyer for gangster Dutch Schultz
- Dixie Davis (baseball) (1890–1944), American Major League Baseball pitcher
- Dixie Dean (1907–1980), English footballer
- Dixie Deans (1946–2025), Scottish footballer
- Dixie Deans (RAF airman) (1913–1989), British Second World War bomber pilot and prisoner of war camp leader
- Dixie Dunbar (1919–1991), American actress
- Dixie Dynamite (born 1959), ring name of American professional wrestler Scott Armstrong
- Dixie Evans (1926–2013), American burlesque dancer and stripper
- Dixie Garr (born 1956), African-American computer engineer
- Dixie Gilmer (1901–1954), American politician
- Dixie Howell (1912–1971), American football and baseball player and coach, member of the College Football Hall of Fame
- Dixie Howell (catcher) (1920–1990), American Major League Baseball catcher
- Dixie Howell (pitcher) (1920–1960), American Major League Baseball pitcher
- Dixie Lee (1911–1952), American actress, dancer, and singer born Wilma Wyatt, first wife of singer Bing Crosby
- Dixie Leverett (1894–1957), American Major League Baseball pitcher
- Dixie McNeil (born 1947), English former footballer and manager
- Dixie Walker (1910–1982), American Major League Baseball player
- Dixie Walker (pitcher) (1887–1965), American Major League Baseball pitcher, father of the above
- Richard L. Walker (1922–2003), American scholar, author, and ambassador to South Korea

== Fictional characters ==
- Dixie Clemets, in the video games Rumble Roses and Rumble Roses XX
- Dixie Cooney, on the daytime television show All My Children
- the title character of Dixie Dugan, an American nationally syndicated comic strip from 1929 to 1966
- Dixie Flatline, in William Gibson's 1984 cyberpunk novel Neuromancer
- Dixie Kong, an animated game character from Nintendo's Donkey Kong series
- Dixie McCall, the senior nurse at Rampart General Hospital on the television show Emergency!, played by Julie London
- Dixie, in the 1987 American buddy cop action movie Lethal Weapon

== See also ==
- Dixi (disambiguation)
- Dixie (disambiguation)
- Dixy (disambiguation)
- Dixy, a surname
