= Donald, West Virginia =

Unincorporated community in West Virginia, United States

- Unincorporated community
- Location within West Virginia Location within the United States
- Coordinates: 38°15′56″N 80°42′33″W
- Country: United States
- State: West Virginia
- County: Nicholas
- Elevation: 2,372 ft (723 m)
- Time zone: UTC-5 (Eastern (EST))
  - Summer (DST): UTC-4 (EDT)
- Area codes: 304 & 681
- GNIS feature ID: 1549657

Donald is an unincorporated community in Nicholas County, West Virginia, United States. Donald is located adjacent to Richwood Municipal Airport, 7.8 miles (12.6 km) east of Summersville.
