= Dixie, Oregon =

Dixie, Oregon may refer to one of these locations in the U.S. state of Oregon:

- Dixie, Baker County, Oregon, a former community and post office
- Dixie, Grant County, Oregon, a former station on the Sumpter Valley Railway
- Dixie, Klamath County, Oregon, a historic locale
- Dixie, a nickname for the Polk County community of Rickreall, Oregon during the U.S. Civil war and some time after
- Dixie, Washington County, Oregon, a populated place and former post office

== See also ==
- Dixie (disambiguation)
