= 1964 West Virginia House of Delegates election =

- November 3, 1964

All 100 seats in the West Virginia House of Delegates 51 seats needed for a majority
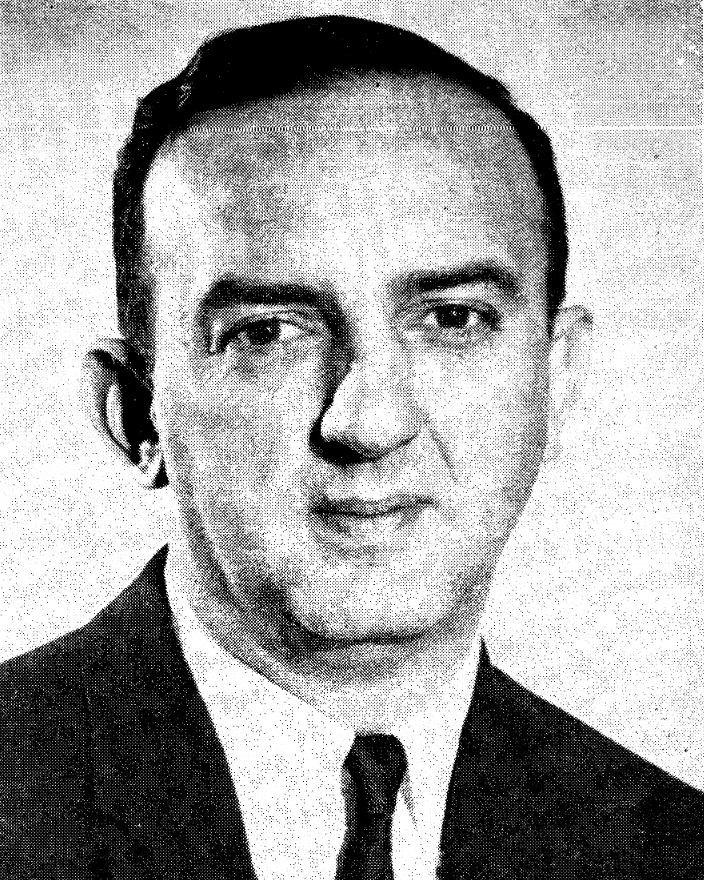

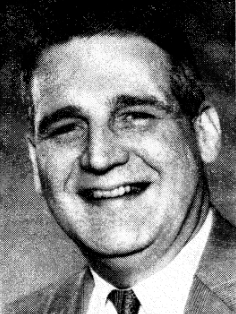
	Majority party	Minority party
Leader	Julius Singleton (retired)	George H. Seibert
Party	Democratic	Republican
Leader since	1961	1957
Leader's seat	Monongalia Co.	Ohio Co.
Last election	76 seats	24 seats
Seats won	91	9
Seat change	▲15	▼15
Popular vote	1,797,081	1,186,755
Percentage	60.23%	39.77%
- Democratic gain Democratic hold Republican gain Republican hold Democratic: 40–50% 50–60% 60–70% 70–80% 80–90% 90–100% Republican: 40–50% 50–60% 60–70%
Speaker before election
Julius Singleton
Democratic
Elected Speaker
H. Laban White
Democratic

Elections to the West Virginia House of Delegates were held on November 3, 1964, to elect 100 candidates to the House to serve a two-year term. The Democrats greatly expanded their supermajority in the chamber, increasing their seat share from 76 to 91, a net gain of 15 seats, pushing the Republicans to a single-digit seat count in the House for the first time in state history, totaling nine seats.

This was the first election since the reapportionment of 1964. For the first time since 1900, multiple counties were placed within delegate districts which elected between one and two delegates; all counties had previously been allocated at least one delegate. An effort to prevent this was put forth, culminating in the so-called 1964 Fair Representation Amendment, a ballot measure to guarantee each county representation in the House, which was soundly defeated.

More populated counties were allocated multiple delegates, allowing voters to cast a number of votes equal to the county's delegate allocation using plurality block voting. Kanawha County was the largest district, returning fourteen delegates to the House. As a result, about 278% more votes were cast in the House of Delegates election than in the concurrent gubernatorial election.

== Reapportionment ==
A new apportionment plan was adopted on January 1, 1964. Counties in bold gained members, while counties in italics lost members. This plan was drawn in the wake of the landmark United States Supreme Court decision Reynolds v. Sims, which required state legislative districts to be roughly equal in population. The state had last reapportioned the House in 1951, and this plan would be used until 1974.

The plan moved several counties which had each elected their own delegate into multi-county districts, reducing their representation in the chamber. This freed up many delegate seats which were redistributed to more populated areas such as the Northern panhandle and in Southern West Virginia.

=== By district ===
- District 1 (Berkeley and Morgan): 2 delegates
- District 2 (Grant and Tucker): 1 delegate (−1)
- District 3 (Hardy and Pendleton): 1 delegate (−1)
- District 4 (Greenbrier and Pocahontas): 2 delegates (−1)
- District 5 (Doddridge and Tyler): 1 delegate (−1)
- District 6 (Pleasants and Ritchie): 1 delegate (−1)
- District 7 (Calhoun, Gilmer, and Wirt): 1 delegate (−2)

=== By county ===
- Barbour: 1 delegate
- **Boone: 2 delegates (+1)**
- Braxton: 1 delegate
- **Brooke: 2 delegates (+1)**
- **Cabell: 6 delegates (+1)**
- Clay: 1 delegate
- Fayette: 3 delegates (−1)
- Hampshire: 1 delegate
- **Hancock: 2 delegate (+1)**
- Harrison: 4 delegates
- Jackson: 1 delegate
- Jefferson: 1 delegate
- **Kanawha: 14 delegates (+3)**
- Lewis: 1 delegate
- Lincoln: 1 delegate
- Logan: 3 delegates (−1)
- Marion: 3 delegates
- Marshall: 2 delegates
- Mason: 1 delegate
- McDowell: 4 delegates (−1)
- **Mercer: 4 delegates (+1)**
- Mineral: 1 delegate
- Mingo: 2 delegates
- Monongalia: 3 delegates
- Monroe: 1 delegate
- Nicholas: 1 delegate
- **Ohio: 4 delegates (+1)**
- Preston: 1 delegate
- Putnam: 1 delegate
- Raleigh: 4 delegates
- Randolph: 1 delegate
- Roane: 1 delegate
- Summers: 1 delegate
- Taylor: 1 delegate
- Upshur: 1 delegate
- Wayne: 2 delegates
- Webster: 1 delegate
- Wetzel: 1 delegate
- **Wood: 4 delegates (+1)**
- Wyoming: 2 delegates

== Summary ==
District	Seats	Incumbent		Status	Elected	
District	Seats	Delegate	Party	Status	Delegate	Party
District 1 (Berkeley and Morgan)	2	Robert M. Steptoe (redistricted from Berkeley County)	Democratic	Incumbent re-elected.	Robert M. Steptoe	Democratic
District 1 (Berkeley and Morgan)	2	Ralph Ben Hovermale (redistricted from Morgan County)	Democratic	Incumbent re-elected.	Ralph B. Hovermale	Democratic
District 2 (Grant and Tucker)	1	Larkin B. Ours (redistricted from Grant County)	Republican	Incumbent re-elected.	Larkin B. Ours	Republican
District 2 (Grant and Tucker)	1	James W. Michael (redistricted from Tucker County)	Republican	Incumbent not re-elected. Republican loss.	Larkin B. Ours	Republican
District 3 (Hardy and Pendleton)	1	William McCoy Jr. (redistricted from Pendleton County)	Democratic	Incumbent re-elected.	William McCoy Jr.	Democratic
District 3 (Hardy and Pendleton)	1	Thomas J. Hawse (redistricted from Hardy County)	Democratic	Incumbent not re-elected. Democratic loss.	William McCoy Jr.	Democratic
District 4 (Greenbrier and Pocahontas)	2	Thomas C. Edgar (redistricted from Pocahontas County)	Democratic	Incumbent re-elected.	Thomas C. Edgar	Democratic
District 4 (Greenbrier and Pocahontas)	2	R. H. Bowman (redistricted from Greenbrier County)	Democratic	Incumbent not re-elected. Democratic hold.	John H. Bowling Jr.	Democratic
District 4 (Greenbrier and Pocahontas)	2	Richard E. Ford (redistricted from Greenbrier County)	Democratic	Incumbent not re-elected. Democratic loss.	John H. Bowling Jr.	Democratic
District 5 (Doddridge and Tyler)	1	Forrest M. Buck (redistricted from Tyler County)	Republican	Incumbent re-elected.	Forrest M. Buck	Republican
District 5 (Doddridge and Tyler)	1	Donald G. Michels (redistricted from Doddridge County)	Republican	Incumbent not re-elected. Republican loss.	Forrest M. Buck	Republican
District 6 (Pleasants and Ritchie)	1	A. M. Kiester (redistricted from Pleasants County)	Republican	Incumbent not re-elected. Democratic gain.	F. Wayne Lanham	Democratic
District 6 (Pleasants and Ritchie)	1	J. F. Deem (redistricted from Ritchie County)	Republican	Incumbent not re-elected. Republican loss.	F. Wayne Lanham	Democratic
Barbour	1	Kenneth Auvil	Democratic	Incumbent re-elected.	Kenneth Auvil	Democratic
Boone	2	Dennie L. Hill	Democratic	Incumbent re-elected.	Dennie L. Hill	Democratic
Boone	2	None (new seat)		Democratic gain.	Thomas Goodwin	Democratic
Braxton	1	Paul S. Moyers	Democratic	Incumbent re-elected.	Paul S. Moyers	Democratic
Brooke	2	Mino R. D'Aurora	Democratic	Incumbent re-elected.	Mino R. D'Aurora	Democratic
Brooke	2	None (new seat)		Democratic gain.	Martin Ragan	Democratic
Cabell	6	J. Bernard Poindexter	Democratic	Incumbent re-elected.	J. Bernard Poindexter	Democratic
Cabell	6	Mike Casey	Democratic	Incumbent re-elected.	Mike Casey	Democratic
Cabell	6	Tennyson J. Bias	Democratic	Incumbent not re-elected. Democratic hold.	Hugh A. Kincaid	Democratic
Cabell	6	Mrs. Betty C. Baker	Democratic	Incumbent not re-elected. Democratic hold.	Freda N. Paul	Democratic
Cabell	6	T. E. Holderby	Republican	Incumbent not re-elected. Democratic gain.	Robert R. Nelson	Democratic
Cabell	6	None (new seat)		Democratic gain.	Don Smith	Democratic
Clay	1	J. Monroe Arbogast	Republican	Incumbent not re-elected. Democratic gain.	Jacob Neal	Democratic
Fayette	3	Robert K. Holliday	Democratic	Incumbent re-elected.	Robert K. Holliday	Democratic
Fayette	3	Earl M. Vickers	Democratic	Incumbent re-elected.	Earl M. Vickers	Democratic
Fayette	3	T. E. Myles	Democratic	Incumbent re-elected.	T. E. Myles	Democratic
Fayette	3	Ethel Crandall	Democratic	Incumbent not re-elected. Democratic loss.	T. E. Myles	Democratic
Hampshire	1	William B. Slonaker	Democratic	Incumbent re-elected.	William B. Slonaker	Democratic
Hancock	2	Callie Tsapis	Democratic	Incumbent not re-elected. Democratic hold.	George D. Tokash	Democratic
Hancock	2	None (new seat)		Democratic gain.	George G. Griffith	Democratic
Harrison	4	H. Laban White	Democratic	Incumbent re-elected.	H. Laban White	Democratic
Harrison	4	C. P. Marstiller	Democratic	Incumbent re-elected.	C. P. Marstiller	Democratic
Harrison	4	Carmine J. Cann	Democratic	Incumbent re-elected.	Carmine J. Cann	Democratic
Harrison	4	Ralph J. Keister	Democratic	Incumbent not re-elected. Democratic hold.	Donald L. Kopp	Democratic
Jackson	1	B. Noel Poling	Republican	Incumbent re-elected.	B. Noel Poling	Republican
Jefferson	1	Thornton W. Wilt	Democratic	Incumbent re-elected.	Thornton W. Wilt	Democratic
Kanawha	14	Ivor F. Boiarsky	Democratic	Incumbent re-elected.	Ivor F. Boiarsky	Democratic
Kanawha	14	Kelly W. Castleberry	Democratic	Incumbent re-elected.	Kelly W. Castleberry	Democratic
Kanawha	14	J. F. Bedell Jr.	Democratic	Incumbent re-elected.	J. F. Bedell Jr.	Democratic
Kanawha	14	Jesse S. Barker	Democratic	Incumbent re-elected.	Jesse S. Barker	Democratic
Kanawha	14	Thomas L. Black	Democratic	Incumbent re-elected.	Thomas L. Black	Democratic
Kanawha	14	Gene W. Bailey	Democratic	Incumbent re-elected.	Gene W. Bailey	Democratic
Kanawha	14	Pat Board Jr.	Democratic	Incumbent re-elected.	Pat Board Jr.	Democratic
Kanawha	14	W. T. Brotherton Jr.	Democratic	Incumbent not re-elected. Democratic hold.	James W. Loop	Democratic
Kanawha	14	Edward D. Knight Jr.	Democratic	Incumbent not re-elected. Democratic hold.	Thomas A. Knight	Democratic
Kanawha	14	Walter W. Carey	Republican	Incumbent lost re-election. Democratic gain.	James E. Kessinger	Democratic
Kanawha	14	Paul Workman	Republican	Incumbent not re-elected. Democratic gain.	Jack L. Pauley	Democratic
Kanawha	14	None (new seat)		Democratic gain.	Kenneth L. Coghill	Democratic
Kanawha	14	None (new seat)		Democratic gain.	Charles Dunaway	Democratic
Kanawha	14	None (new seat)		Democratic gain.	Fred Scott	Democratic
Lewis	1	Louis G. Craig	Democratic	Incumbent re-elected.	Louis G. Craig	Democratic
Lincoln	1	A. J. Belcher	Democratic	Incumbent re-elected.	A. J. Belcher	Democratic
Logan	3	Luther H. Ghiz	Democratic	Incumbent re-elected.	Luther H. Ghiz	Democratic
Logan	3	W. N. Anderson	Democratic	Incumbent re-elected.	W. N. Anderson	Democratic
Logan	3	Earl B. Hager	Democratic	Incumbent re-elected.	Earl B. Hager	Democratic
Logan	3	Bernard L. Miller	Democratic	Incumbent not re-elected. Democratic loss.	Earl B. Hager	Democratic
Marion	3	J. E. Watson	Democratic	Incumbent re-elected.	J. E. Watson	Democratic
Marion	3	Robert H. Tennant	Democratic	Incumbent not re-elected. Democratic hold.	Paul Biz Dawson	Democratic
Marion	3	W. R. Wilson	Democratic	Incumbent not re-elected. Democratic hold.	Nick Fantasia	Democratic
Marshall	2	John T. Madden	Democratic	Incumbent re-elected.	John T. Madden	Democratic
Marshall	2	Gordon W. Sammons	Republican	Incumbent not re-elected. Democratic gain.	Robert F. Stewart	Democratic
Mason	1	Carroll W. Casto	Republican	Incumbent not re-elected. Republican hold.	Brereton C. Jones	Republican
McDowell	4	W. D. Mentz	Democratic	Incumbent re-elected.	W. D. Mentz	Democratic
McDowell	4	Harry R. Pauley	Democratic	Incumbent re-elected.	Harry R. Pauley	Democratic
McDowell	4	Fred G. Wooten	Democratic	Incumbent re-elected.	Fred G. Wooten	Democratic
McDowell	4	Edward W. Dye	Democratic	Incumbent not re-elected. Democratic hold.	Corbett Church	Democratic
McDowell	4	Mrs. Elizabeth Drewry	Democratic	Incumbent not re-elected. Democratic loss.	Corbett Church	Democratic
Mercer	4	Clarence C. Christian Jr.	Democratic	Incumbent re-elected.	Clarence C. Christian Jr.	Democratic
Mercer	4	Charles E. Lohr	Democratic	Incumbent re-elected.	Charles E. Lohr	Democratic
Mercer	4	Walter Vergil Ross	Democratic	Incumbent not re-elected. Democratic hold.	James C. Cain	Democratic
Mercer	4	None (new seat)		Democratic gain.	Robert E. Holroyd	Democratic
Mineral	1	Paul F. Giffin	Republican	Incumbent not re-elected. Republican hold.	Robert D. Harman	Republican
Mingo	2	Bill Blankenship	Democratic	Incumbent not re-elected. Democratic hold.	Robert L. Simpkins	Democratic
Mingo	2	Anthony R. Gentile	Democratic	Incumbent not re-elected. Democratic hold.	T.I. Varney	Democratic
Monongalia	3	John W. Pyles	Democratic	Incumbent re-elected.	John W. Pyles	Democratic
Monongalia	3	Julius W. Singleton Jr.	Democratic	Incumbent not re-elected. Democratic hold.	Charles S. Armistead	Democratic
Monongalia	3	Charles H. Haden II	Republican	Incumbent lost re-election. Democratic gain.	Harry U. Howell	Democratic
Monroe	1	T. G. Matney	Democratic	Incumbent not re-elected. Democratic hold.	William Marion Shiflet	Democratic
Nicholas	1	D. R. Frazer	Democratic	Incumbent re-elected.	D. R. Frazer	Democratic
Ohio	4	George H. Seibert Jr.	Republican	Incumbent re-elected.	George H. Seibert Jr.	Republican
Ohio	4	Harry L. Buch	Republican	Incumbent lost re-election. Democratic gain.	John L. Seabright	Democratic
Ohio	4	George S. Weaver Jr.	Republican	Incumbent lost re-election. Democratic gain.	Joseph V. Dusel	Democratic
Ohio	4	None (new seat)		Democratic gain.	Jack R. Adams	Democratic
Preston	1	Chester Liller	Republican	Incumbent lost re-election. Democratic gain.	Ira L. Wright	Democratic
Putnam	1	Earl K. Kelley	Democratic	Incumbent not re-elected. Democratic hold.	J. R. Dick Gibson	Democratic
Raleigh	4	H. Dale Covey	Democratic	Incumbent re-elected.	H. Dale Covey	Democratic
Raleigh	4	Mrs. W. W. Withrow	Democratic	Incumbent re-elected.	Mrs. W. W. Withrow	Democratic
Raleigh	4	A. David Abrams	Democratic	Incumbent not re-elected. Democratic hold.	E. M. Ned Payne	Democratic
Raleigh	4	C. Berkley Lilly	Democratic	Incumbent not re-elected. Democratic hold.	Lewis A. McManus	Democratic
Randolph	1	Jack R. Nuzum	Democratic	Incumbent re-elected.	Earl H. Stalnaker	Democratic
Roane	1	Gene M. Ashley	Republican	Incumbent re-elected.	Gene M. Ashley	Republican
Summers	1	Ray E. Sawyers	Democratic	Incumbent re-elected.	Ray E. Sawyers	Democratic
Taylor	1	Lloyd L. Shriver	Democratic	Incumbent not re-elected. Democratic hold.	S. A. Morasco	Democratic
Upshur	1	W. W. Corder	Democratic	Incumbent lost re-election. Republican gain.	Kenneth E. Queen	Republican
Wayne	2	Clayton C. Davidson	Democratic	Incumbent re-elected.	Clayton C. Davidson	Democratic
Wayne	2	Lewis Glenn Mills	Democratic	Incumbent not re-elected. Democratic hold.	Boyd Mathis	Democratic
Webster	1	D. P. Given	Democratic	Incumbent re-elected.	D. P. Given	Democratic
Wetzel	1	Herbert Schupbach	Democratic	Incumbent re-elected.	Herbert Schupbach	Democratic
Wood	4	Calvin A. Calendine	Republican	Incumbent lost re-election. Democratic gain.	J. Douglas Ayers	Democratic
Wood	4	Spencer K. Creel	Republican	Incumbent lost re-election. Democratic gain.	Eugene Knotts	Democratic
Wood	4	James W. Simonton	Republican	Incumbent lost re-election. Democratic gain.	Russell G. Beall	Democratic
Wood	4	None (new seat)		Republican gain.	William P. A. Nicely	Republican
Wyoming	2	J. Paul England	Democratic	Incumbent re-elected.	J. Paul England	Democratic
Wyoming	2	Mrs. Mae S. Belcher	Democratic	Incumbent not re-elected. Democratic hold.	C. E. (Blackie) Allen	Democratic

== District 1 ==
District 1 election 2 to be elected
Party	Candidate	Votes	%
Democratic	Robert M. Steptoe	9,974	29.30%
Democratic	Ralph B. Hovermale	9,543	28.04%
Republican	Joe F. Wagner	7,510	22.06%
Republican	Ward W. Keesecker	7,012	20.60%
Total votes		34,039	100.00%

== District 2 ==
District 2 election 1 to be elected
Party	Candidate	Votes	%
Republican	Larkin B. Ours	4,088	53.58%
Democratic	Carl R. Barr	3,542	46.42%
Total votes		7,630	100.00%

== District 3 ==
District 3 election 1 to be elected
Party	Candidate	Votes	%
Democratic	William McCoy Jr.	4,835	62.85%
Republican	Paul Harper	2,858	37.15%
Total votes		7,693	100.00%

== District 4 ==
District 4 election 2 to be elected
Party	Candidate	Votes	%
Democratic	Thomas C. Edgar	12,103	39.11%
Democratic	John H. Bowling Jr.	11,950	38.61%
Republican	Oscar Nelson Jr.	6,896	22.28%
Total votes		30,949	100.00%

== District 5 ==
District 5 election 1 to be elected
Party	Candidate	Votes	%
Republican	Forrest M. Buck	4,781	63.06%
Democratic	Harry Ash	2,801	36.94%
Total votes		7,582	100.00%

== District 6 ==
District 6 election 1 to be elected
Party	Candidate	Votes	%
Democratic	F. Wayne Lanham	4,247	50.82%
Republican	C. R. (Pop) Sullivan	4,110	49.18%
Total votes		8,357	100.00%

== District 7 ==
District 7 election 2 to be elected
Party	Candidate	Votes	%
Democratic	Paul H. Kidd	5,431	55.71%
Republican	James Roydice Jones	4,318	44.29%
Total votes		9,749	100.00%

== Barbour County ==
Barbour County election 1 to be elected
Party	Candidate	Votes	%
Democratic	Kenneth Auvil	4,661	64.85%
Republican	James C. Kelley	2,526	35.15%
Total votes		7,187	100.00%

== Boone County ==
Boone County election 2 to be elected
Party	Candidate	Votes	%
Democratic	Dennie L. Hill	7,482	36.15%
Democratic	Thomas Goodwin	7,315	35.34%
Republican	Ezra H. Lilly	3,235	15.63%
Republican	Harold G. Lewis	2,665	12.88%
Total votes		20,697	100.00%

== Braxton County ==
Braxton County election 1 to be elected
Party	Candidate	Votes	%
Democratic	Paul S. Moyers	4,304	100.00%
Total votes		4,304	100.00%

== Brooke County ==
Brooke County election 2 to be elected
Party	Candidate	Votes	%
Democratic	Mino R. D'Aurora	7,601	32.52%
Democratic	Martin Ragan	7,148	30.58%
Republican	Paul Conaway	4,947	21.17%
Republican	Blair R. Geho	3,675	15.72%
Total votes		23,371	100.00%

== Cabell County ==
Cabell County election 6 to be elected
Party	Candidate	Votes	%
Democratic	D. J. Bernard Poindexter	24,427	9.76%
Democratic	Hugh A. Kincaid	24,122	9.64%
Democratic	Freda N. Paul	23,251	9.29%
Democratic	Mike Casey	23,229	9.29%
Democratic	Robert R. Nelson	23,210	9.28%
Democratic	Don Smith	22,467	8.98%
Republican	Mae Newman	20,833	8.33%
Republican	G. Y. Neal	20,163	8.06%
Republican	Carroll Lindsey Baker	17,502	7.00%
Republican	J. Shelby Christian	17,332	6.93%
Republican	Eugene W. Childers	17,068	6.82%
Republican	Carl N. Woodrum	16,553	6.62%
Total votes		250,157	100.00%

== Clay County ==
Clay County election 1 to be elected
Party	Candidate	Votes	%
Democratic	Jacob Neal	2,356	53.38%
Republican	J. Monroe Arbogast	2,058	46.62%
Total votes		4,414	100.00%

== Fayette County ==
Fayette County election 3 to be elected
Party	Candidate	Votes	%
Democratic	Robert K. Holliday	18,463	27.37%
Democratic	Earl M. Vickers	17,831	26.43%
Democratic	T. E. Myles	17,767	26.34%
Republican	Harvey Layne Jr.	5,112	7.58%
Republican	Thomas E. Ashe Jr.	4,293	6.36%
Republican	Louis Murad	3,990	5.91%
Total votes		67,456	100.00%

== Hampshire County ==
Hampshire County election 1 to be elected
Party	Candidate	Votes	%
Democratic	William B. Slonaker	3,304	100.00%
Total votes		3,304	100.00%

== Hancock County ==
Hancock County election 2 to be elected
Party	Candidate	Votes	%
Democratic	George D. Tokash	12,057	35.83%
Democratic	George G. Griffith	11,453	34.04%
Republican	James E. Porter	5,770	17.15%
Republican	John Lincoln Owen	4,367	12.98%
Total votes		33,647	100.00%

== Harrison County ==
Harrison County election 4 to be elected
Party	Candidate	Votes	%
Democratic	H. Laban White	21,328	20.24%
Democratic	C. P. Marstiller	20,980	19.91%
Democratic	Donald L. Kopp	20,483	19.44%
Democratic	Carmine J. Cann	20,156	19.13%
Republican	Denzil A. Lambert	12,465	11.83%
Republican	Joseph A. Rosi	9,946	9.44%
Total votes		105,358	100.00%

== Jackson County ==
Jackson County election 1 to be elected
Party	Candidate	Votes	%
Republican	B. Noel Poling	5,284	57.91%
Democratic	Dick Nicholson	3,841	42.09%
Total votes		9,125	100.00%

== Jefferson County ==
Jefferson County election 1 to be elected
Party	Candidate	Votes	%
Democratic	Thornton W. Wilt	4,952	99.68%
Write-in	Harvey Beeler	4	0.08%
Write-in	Adam Craven	3	0.06%
Write-in	Louise Leonard	2	0.04%
Write-in	Robert H. Cain	2	0.04%
Write-in	Roger Ramey	1	0.02%
Write-in	Dean Nichols	1	0.02%
Write-in	Steve Clopper	1	0.02%
Write-in	Carlton Hehle	1	0.02%
Write-in	Byron H. Webb	1	0.02%
Total votes		4,968	100.00%

== Kanawha County ==
Kanawha County election 14 to be elected
Party	Candidate	Votes	%
Democratic	Ivor F. Boiarsky	57,000	4.19%
Democratic	James W. Loop	55,276	4.07%
Democratic	Kelly L. Castleberry	54,767	4.03%
Democratic	Thomas A. Knight	54,446	4.01%
Democratic	J. F. Bedell Jr.	54,061	3.98%
Democratic	Jesse S. Barker	53,599	3.94%
Democratic	Thomas L. Black	53,569	3.94%
Democratic	James E. Kessinger	53,556	3.94%
Democratic	Gene W. Bailey	53,531	3.94%
Democratic	Jack L. Pauley	52,415	3.86%
Democratic	Pat Board Jr.	52,228	3.84%
Democratic	Kenneth L. Coghill	51,959	3.82%
Democratic	Charles Dunaway	51,013	3.75%
Democratic	Fred Scott	50,394	3.71%
Republican	Neal A. Kinsolving	46,014	3.39%
Republican	Walter W. Carey	45,883	3.38%
Republican	Henry Hoppy Shores	45,625	3.36%
Republican	Stanley E. Deutsch	44,390	3.27%
Republican	Timothy N. Barber	43,728	3.22%
Republican	Thomas E. Potter	43,689	3.22%
Republican	Lon C. Kinder	43,556	3.21%
Republican	Aaron Mike Cohen	43,525	3.20%
Republican	.John T. Poffenbarger	43,511	3.20%
Republican	Rev. William Ricks	43,182	3.18%
Republican	J'ed Armbrecht	42,408	3.12%
Republican	Alfred A. Lilly	41,926	3.09%
Republican	J. T. Greene	41,925	3.09%
Republican	Harry S. Barr Jr.	41,696	3.07%
Total votes		1,358,872	100.00%

== Lewis County ==
Lewis County election 1 to be elected
Party	Candidate	Votes	%
Democratic	Louis G. Craig	4,269	54.24%
Republican	Emil E. Baldwin	3,602	45.76%
Total votes		7,871	100.00%

== Lincoln County ==
Lincoln County election 1 to be elected
Party	Candidate	Votes	%
Democratic	A. J. Belcher	5,186	57.54%
Republican	Everett Lee Elkins	3,827	42.46%
Total votes		9,013	100.00%

== Logan County ==
Logan County election 3 to be elected
Party	Candidate	Votes	%
Democratic	Luther H. Ghiz	15,250	25.91%
Democratic	w. N. Anderson	15,203	25.83%
Democratic	Earl Hager	15,141	25.72%
Republican	Charles Mitchell	4,480	7.61%
Republican	Clyde B. White	4,435	7.53%
Republican	Lonnie Trivette	4,353	7.40%
Total votes		58,862	100.00%

== Marion County ==
Marion County election 3 to be elected
Party	Candidate	Votes	%
Democratic	Paul Biz Dawson	17,837	20.97%
Democratic	J. E. Ned Watson	16,484	19.38%
Democratic	Nick Fantasia	15,568	18.30%
Republican	J. Marshall McAteer	12,017	14.13%
Republican	Robert 0. Tinnell	11,981	14.08%
Republican	Odbert C. Kisner	11,178	13.14%
Total votes		85,065	100.00%

== Marshall County ==
Marshall County election 2 to be elected
Party	Candidate	Votes	%
Democratic	John T. Madden	9,475	27.98%
Democratic	Robert F. Stewart	8,343	24.64%
Republican	Donald E. Kettlewell	8,248	24.36%
Republican	J. K. Chase Jr.	7,797	23.03%
Total votes		33,863	100.00%

== Mason County ==
Mason County election 1 to be elected
Party	Candidate	Votes	%
Republican	Brereton C. Jones	5,383	50.57%
Democratic	Claude E. Swann	5,261	49.43%
Total votes		10,644	100.00%

== McDowell County ==
McDowell County election 4 to be elected
Party	Candidate	Votes	%
Democratic	IV. Dewey Mentz	16,685	20.94%
Democratic	Harry R. Pauley	16,473	20.68%
Democratic	Fred G. Wooten	16,385	20.57%
Democratic	Corbett Church	16,327	20.49%
Republican	Mrs. Thelma Branch	3,687	4.63%
Republican	Hursel Bostic	3,449	4.33%
Republican	Archie Maynard	3,365	4.22%
Republican	William Norris Jr,	3,302	4.14%
Total votes		79,673	100.00%

== Mercer County ==
Mercer County election 4 to be elected
Party	Candidate	Votes	%
Democratic	James C. Cain	16,503	17.96%
Democratic	Robert E. Holroyd	16,040	17.45%
Democratic	Charles E. Lohr	16,035	17.45%
Democratic	Clarence C. Christian Jr.	15,783	17.17%
Republican	Ella Nash Jarrell	8,146	8.86%
Republican	Ben B. Peck	6,931	7.54%
Republican	Earl Landers	6,866	7.47%
Republican	Lemuel L. Martin	5,597	6.09%
Total votes		91,901	100.00%

== Mineral County ==
Mineral County election 1 to be elected
Party	Candidate	Votes	%
Republican	Robert D. Harman	5,185	53.78%
Democratic	John R. Powell	4,457	46.22%
Total votes		9,642	100.00%

== Mingo County ==
Mingo County election 2 to be elected
Party	Candidate	Votes	%
Democratic	Robert L. Simpkins	11,498	43.74%
Democratic	T.'I. Varney	11,179	42.53%
Republican	Thomas D. White	3,609	13.73%
Total votes		26,286	100.00%

== Monongalia County ==
Monongalia County election 3 to be elected
Party	Candidate	Votes	%
Democratic	John W. Pyles	14,093	20.76%
Democratic	Charles S. Armistead	13,914	20.50%
Democratic	Harry U. Howell	12,527	18.45%
Republican	Charles H. Haden II	10,890	16.04%
Republican	John E. Crynock	8,741	12.88%
Republican	William Delardas	7,724	11.38%
Total votes		67,889	100.00%

== Monroe County ==
Monroe County election 1 to be elected
Party	Candidate	Votes	%
Democratic	William Marion Shiflet	3,502	60.55%
Republican	Charles H. Allen Jr.	2,282	39.45%
Total votes		5,784	100.00%

== Nicholas County ==
Nicholas County election 1 to be elected
Party	Candidate	Votes	%
Democratic	D R. (Doc) Frazer	6,482	100.00%
Total votes		6,482	100.00%

== Ohio County ==
Ohio County election 4 to be elected
Party	Candidate	Votes	%
Democratic	John L. Seabright	17,730	14.18%
Democratic	Joseph V. Dusel	17,059	13.64%
Republican	George H. Seibert	16,899	13.51%
Democratic	Jack R. Adams	16,509	13.20%
Republican	Harry L. Buch	15,203	12.16%
Republican	George S. Weaver Jr.	14,623	11.69%
Democratic	Leslie D. Timberlake	13,819	11.05%
Republican	Paul L. Teare	13,198	10.56%
Total votes		125,040	100.00%

== Preston County ==
Preston County election 1 to be elected
Party	Candidate	Votes	%
Democratic	Ira L. Wright	4,795	50.27%
Republican	Chester Liller	4,744	49.73%
Total votes		9,539	100.00%

== Putnam County ==
Putnam County election 1 to be elected
Party	Candidate	Votes	%
Democratic	J. R. Dick Gibson	5,450	51.00%
Republican	Don Hardman	5,237	49.00%
Total votes		10,687	100.00%

== Raleigh County ==
Raleigh County election 4 to be elected
Party	Candidate	Votes	%
Democratic	E. M. Ned Payne	21,378	19.17%
Democratic	Lewis A. McManus	20,152	18.07%
Democratic	H. Dale Covey	19,432	17.43%
Democratic	Mrs. W. W. Withrow	19,236	17.25%
Republican	Benjamin M. Guy Jr.	8,369	7.51%
Republican	Herbert A. Buckley	8,287	7.43%
Republican	Carl W. Jones	7,571	6.79%
Republican	Norvel Williams	7,074	6.34%
Total votes		111,499	100.00%

== Randolph County ==
Randolph County election 1 to be elected
Party	Candidate	Votes	%
Democratic	Earl H. Stalnaker	7,678	72.07%
Republican	Lyman A. Clark Jr.	2,975	27.93%
Total votes		10,653	100.00%

== Roane County ==
Roane County election 1 to be elected
Party	Candidate	Votes	%
Republican	Gene M. Ashley	3,633	52.80%
Democratic	Jack C. Whiting	3,248	47.20%
Total votes		6,881	100.00%

== Summers County ==
Summers County election 1 to be elected
Party	Candidate	Votes	%
Democratic	Ray E. Sawyers	4,497	80.07%
Republican	Eddie Cales	1,119	19.93%
Total votes		5,616	100.00%

== Taylor County ==
Taylor County election 1 to be elected
Party	Candidate	Votes	%
Democratic	S. A. Morasco	3,725	57.38%
Republican	Harry C. Mikels	2,767	42.62%
Total votes		6,492	100.00%

== Upshur County ==
Upshur County election 1 to be elected
Party	Candidate	Votes	%
Republican	Kenneth E. Queen	3,786	53.15%
Democratic	Dr. IV. IV. Corder	3,337	46.85%
Total votes		7,123	100.00%

== Wayne County ==
Wayne County election 2 to be elected
Party	Candidate	Votes	%
Democratic	Clayton C. Davidson	10,087	32.85%
Democratic	Boyd Mathis	9,890	32.21%
Republican	James I. Toblin	5,598	18.23%
Republican	Arnold Cupid Kirk	5,127	16.70%
Total votes		30,702	100.00%

== Webster County ==
Webster County election 1 to be elected
Party	Candidate	Votes	%
Democratic	D. P. Sheriff Given	3,380	100.00%
Total votes		3,380	100.00%

== Wetzel County ==
Wetzel County election 1 to be elected
Party	Candidate	Votes	%
Democratic	Herbert Schupbach	5,678	62.64%
Republican	Ralph L. Wildman	3,387	37.36%
Total votes		9,065	100.00%

== Wood County ==
Wood County election 4 to be elected
Party	Candidate	Votes	%
Democratic	J. Douglas Ayers	18,210	13.15%
Democratic	Eugene Knotts	18,085	13.06%
Democratic	Russell G. Beall	17,410	12.57%
Republican	William P. A. Nicely	17,244	12.45%
Democratic	Robert IV. Bailey	17,127	12.37%
Republican	Spencer K. Creel	17,025	12.29%
Republican	Calvin A. Calendine	17,002	12.28%
Republican	Gene A. Haynes	16,397	11.84%
Total votes		138,500	100.00%

== Wyoming County ==
Wyoming County election 2 to be elected
Party	Candidate	Votes	%
Democratic	C. E. (Blackie) Allen	8,496	50.45%
Democratic	J. Paul England	8,345	49.55%
Total votes		16,841	100.00%

== See also ==
- 1964 United States presidential election in West Virginia
- 1964 United States Senate election in West Virginia
- 1964 United States House of Representatives elections in West Virginia
- 1964 West Virginia gubernatorial election
