= Odell Town, West Virginia =

- Unincorporated community
- Location within West Virginia Location within the United States
- Coordinates: 38°11′52″N 80°42′48″W
- Country: United States
- State: West Virginia
- County: Nicholas
- Elevation: 2,648 ft (807 m)
- Time zone: UTC-5 (Eastern (EST))
  - Summer (DST): UTC-4 (EDT)
- Area codes: 304 & 681
- GNIS feature ID: 1552367

Odell Town is an unincorporated community in Nicholas County, West Virginia, United States. Odell Town is 9.5 miles (15.3 km) southeast of Summersville.
