= Dixie Hills =

Dixie Hills may mean:

- Dixie Hills, Atlanta, a neighborhood
- Dixie Hills, Nevada, a mountain range
