= Persinger, West Virginia =

- Unincorporated community
- Location within West Virginia Location within the United States
- Coordinates: 38°19′19″N 80°45′07″W
- Country: United States
- State: West Virginia
- County: Nicholas
- Elevation: 1,991 ft (607 m)
- Time zone: UTC-5 (Eastern (EST))
  - Summer (DST): UTC-4 (EDT)
- Area codes: 304 & 681
- GNIS feature ID: 1544737

Persinger is an unincorporated community in Nicholas County, West Virginia, United States. Persinger is located on West Virginia Route 41, 6 miles (9.7 km) northeast of Summersville.

The community most likely was named after nearby Persinger Creek.
