= Dixie Union =

Dixie Union may refer to:

- Dixie Union, Georgia, USA
- Dixie Union (horse) (1997–2010), thoroughbred horse bred on Lane's End Farm, fathered by Dixieland Band, and sired Dixie Commander and Hot Dixie Chick
- Dixie Union Chapel & Cemetery, built in 1837 in Dixie, Mississauga, Ontario, Canada
- Dixie Union, a small flexible film business based in Kempten, Germany that used to be part of Continental Can Company

== See also ==
- Dixie (disambiguation)
- Union (disambiguation)
