= Dixy (disambiguation) =

Dixy is the trade name of a well known chain of stores in Russia; a top retailer of food and general household merchandise. It may also refer to:

== Businesses with the name ==
- Dixy Chicken, an English fast food chain, founded in 1986, with outlets across the United Kingdom that specialize in preparing and serving halal chicken

== People with the name ==
- Dixy Ann Hepburn, Miss International 1971 contestant from Trinidad and Tobago
- Dixy Lee Ray (1914–1994), American scientist and politician who served as the 17th Governor of Washington

== See also ==
- Dixi (disambiguation)
- Dixie (disambiguation)
- Dixy, a surname
