= Canvas, West Virginia =

- Unincorporated community
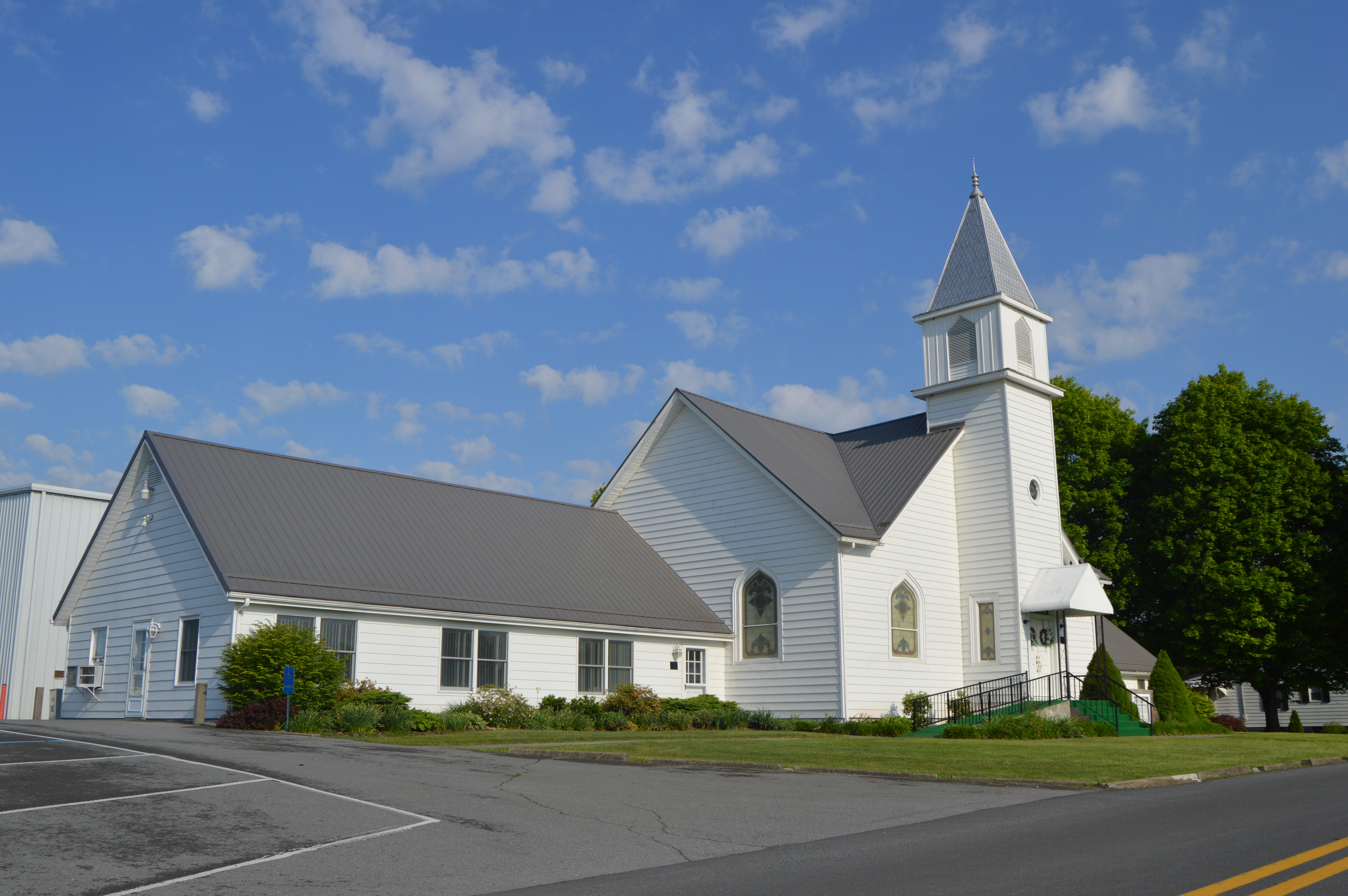
- Jordan Chapel on Groves Road

- Location within West Virginia Location within the United States
- Coordinates: 38°16′06″N 80°46′27″W
- Country: United States
- State: West Virginia
- County: Nicholas
- Elevation: 2,133 ft (650 m)
- Time zone: UTC-5 (Eastern (EST))
  - Summer (DST): UTC-4 (EDT)
- ZIP code: 26662
- Area codes: 304 & 681
- GNIS feature ID: 1537024

Canvas is an unincorporated community in Nicholas County, West Virginia, United States. Canvas is located on West Virginia Route 39, 4 miles (6.4 km) east of Summersville. Canvas has a post office with ZIP code 26662.

Canvas was originally named Earl but the residents of the area were not fond of the name. Around 1910, Charles William “Bill” Bryant owned a general store and was selling canvas gloves which were a huge hit with the community. At that point, residents held a meeting and it was decided that they would rename the community to Canvas.
