= Dixie, Georgia =

Dixie, Georgia may refer to the following places in the U.S. state of Georgia:

- Dixie, Brooks County, Georgia, an unincorporated community and census-designated place
- Dixie, Newton County, Georgia, an unincorporated community
