= Jacob Neal =

American politician (1881–1967)

Member of the West Virginia House of Delegates
- In office 1918–1920
- Constituency: Webster County
- In office 1932–1940
- In office 1952–1954
- Constituency: Nicholas County
- In office 1964–1966
- Constituency: Clay County

Personal details
- Born: Jacob Alexander Neal; June 15, 1881 Lizemores, West Virginia
- Died: May 28, 1967 (aged 85)
- Party: Democratic
- Spouse(s): Ora Woods (m. 1905; died 1917) Lula J. McClung (m. 1932; died 1952)

Jacob Alexander Neal (June 15, 1881 – May 28, 1967) was an American politician from the state of West Virginia. A Democrat, Neal was the first member of the West Virginia House of Delegates in the state's history to serve from three different counties: from Webster County at the 1918 general election, from Nicholas County at the 1932, 1934, 1936, 1938, and 1952 general elections, and was elected to his final term from Clay County at the 1964 general election at the age of 83. Neal died on May 28, 1967.
