= Gilboa, West Virginia =

Unincorporated community in West Virginia, United States

- Unincorporated community
- Location within West Virginia Location within the United States
- Coordinates: 38°18′12″N 80°56′11″W
- Country: United States
- State: West Virginia
- County: Nicholas
- Elevation: 2,251 ft (686 m)
- Time zone: UTC-5 (Eastern (EST))
  - Summer (DST): UTC-4 (EDT)
- ZIP code: 26671
- Area codes: 304 & 681
- GNIS feature ID: 1539393

Gilboa is an unincorporated community in Nicholas County, West Virginia, United States. Gilboa is located on West Virginia Route 39, 5 miles (8.0 km) west-northwest of Summersville. Gilboa has a post office with ZIP code 26671.

The community derives its name, directly or indirectly, from Mount Gilboa in Israel.
