= Hookersville, West Virginia =

- Unincorporated community
- Location within West Virginia Location within the United States
- Coordinates: 38°23′08″N 80°48′35″W
- Country: United States
- State: West Virginia
- County: Nicholas
- Elevation: 1,860 ft (570 m)
- Time zone: UTC-5 (Eastern (EST))
  - Summer (DST): UTC-4 (EDT)
- Area codes: 304 & 681
- GNIS feature ID: 1554736

Hookersville is an unincorporated community in Nicholas County, West Virginia, United States. Hookersville is 7.5 miles (12.1 km) north-northeast of Summersville.

A post office called Hookersville was established in 1856, and remained in operation until it was discontinued in 1962.
