= Gonnie Siegel =

American journalist, writer, feminist and businesswoman

- Siegel, circa 1982
- Born: Thelma Gondoleen McClung; March 5, 1928; Mt. Lookout, West Virginia
- Died: September 29, 2005 (aged 77); Gainesville, Florida
- Other name: Gonnie McClung Siegel
- Occupations: journalist, early women's rights activist

Gonnie Siegel (March 5, 1928 – September 29, 2005) was an American journalist and writer. Deeply involved from its mid-20th century outset in the Women's Liberation Movement, she was one of the half-dozen founders of the chapter of the National Organization for Women (NOW) of Westchester, New York and was an editor of NOW's national newsletter, Do it NOW. After college, she wrote news and advertising copy for a radio station in Welch WV and soon afterwards became a reporter for the daily newspaper the Lorain (Ohio) Journal. In the early 1970s, after a hiatus as a homemaker, she published the first of her four books advising women on career opportunities and also opened her own communications firm.

== Early life ==
Thelma Gondoleen McClung was born in 1928 in what originally was a log cabin in the Appalachian mountain hamlet of Mt. Lookout, West Virginia to Margaret Iva (née McGee) and Crosby McClung. McClung self-identified her ancestry as mixed Scots-Irish and German and also Native American Mingo people. Her heritage stretched back to the earliest European settlers in the western part of Virginia. She grew up with an older sister, Verbena and younger brother Lake McGee, in Fayette County, West Virginia. The family was impoverished and for the first 12 years of her life had no running water or electricity in their Appalachian home. After dropping out of school at 13 to help with her family finances, she took a job working in a bakery, where she was paid $12 per week. After two years, she met with the principal of Elkins High school and persuaded him to allow her to join her age-group class and graduate with that original class, but only if she could make up the classwork. After graduating from Elkins High school, McClung attended Davis and Elkins College on a full scholarship and went on to earn a bachelor's degree in journalism from West Virginia University.

== Career ==
While writing for the Lorain Journal, she met and married another reporter, Robert J. Siegel. They lived for six years in Cleveland where Robert was a reporter for the Cleveland Press, then moved to Westchester County, New York where he became a senior communications executive for IBM. They had two sons, William Laird and Richard Joseph. For twelve years, Siegel raised their children and did volunteer work with organizations like the League of Women Voters.

In 1970, she started her communications firm and ghost wrote a weekly column for her first client, black activist and businessman Warren Jackson, which appeared in The Westchester-Rockland News. About the same time, she became one of the founders of the local chapter of the National Organization for Women. Elected as president of the Westchester chapter of NOW, she served until 1973, while simultaneously editing the newsletter for the National chapter of NOW, Do it NOW. She supported women being paid for performing domestic work, and favored paying cleaners to care for the home. Siegel was also in favor of decriminalizing abortion, believing that it was a medical and moral issue, not a crime. By 1972, she had opened a public relations firm and was acting as a business consultant for other women. She worked with Circulation Experti, Warren Jackson's business, and was a supporter of the Civil Rights Movement, coordinating the annual Martin Luther King, Jr. Memorial Breakfast, as a way of expanding awareness of those for whom King advocated.

In 1975, Siegel published her first book, The Women's Workbook, co-authored with Karin Abarbanel. The book gave practical advice to women seeking to enter the work force and explored methods of combating biases about women employees. She suggested that rather than accepting low-paying traditional jobs because they had been out of the workforce raising family or being labeled as temporary because they were of child-bearing age, women should seek employment in non-traditional fields that had shortages of workers. The book was popular and was reprinted in 1976. In 1977, she became chair of the Equal Employment Opportunities committee of the Westchester County Women's Task Force and worked to have the gendered classifications of job descriptions removed from government service positions. Her second book, How to Advertise and Promote Your Small Business gave basic tips on how to promote business services including budgeting for marketing, analyzing timing, and writing press releases.

Serving as the chair of the Equal Rights Amendment committee for the Westchester Women's Council in 1981, Siegel worked almost 24-7 for a year for passage of the amendment to the United States Constitution aimed at protecting women's basic human rights by eliminating sexism as a legal barrier. The following year, she published Sales: The Fast Track for Women, in which she advocated that sales careers typically offered women better opportunity for advancement and higher income than other fields. When assessing performance and achievement, volume sales and profits fostered corporate advancement and moving up in management more often than other jobs traditionally associated with women. In addition to creating management training courses for corporations and giving sales seminars for women, Siegel was a sought after public speaker for workshops and conferences.

== Death and legacy ==
In 1989, Siegel and her husband retired and moved first to the Florida Keys and later to Gainesville, Florida, where she died after a lengthy battle with Alzheimer's disease on September 29, 2005. In 2006, her biography was included in the compilation, Feminists Who Changed America, 1963–1975.

== Selected works ==
- Abarbanel, Karin; Siegel, Gonnie McClung (1975). Woman's Work Book. New York, New York: Praeger. OCLC 654839672.
- Siegel, Gonnie McClung (1978). How to Advertise and Promote Your Small Business. New York, New York: John Wiley & Sons. ISBN 0-471-04032-0.
- Chastain, Sherry (1980). Littwin, Dianne; Siegel, Gonnie McClung (eds.). Winning the Salary Game: Salary negotiation for women. New York, New York: John Wiley & Sons. ISBN 0-471-08433-6.
- Kornfeld, Leo; Siegel, Gonnie; Siegel, William Laird (1981). How to Beat the High Cost of Learning: The Complete and Up-to-Date Guide to Student Financial Aid. New York, New York: Rawson, Wade Publishers. ISBN 0-892-56194-7.
- Siegel, Gonnie McClung (1982). Sales: The Fast Track for Women. New York, New York: Jove Publications. ISBN 0-515-07358-X.
- Siegel, Gonnie McClung (1983). "The Three-Hour Class". In Behr, Marion; Lazar, Wendy (eds.). Women Working Home: The Homebased Business Guide and Directory. Emmaus, Pennsylvania: Women Working Home Press, Inc. pp. 171–172. ISBN 978-0-939240-01-2.
