= Cottle, West Virginia =

Unincorporated community in West Virginia, United States

Cottle
- Unincorporated community
- Location within the state of West Virginia Cottle (the United States)
- Coordinates: 38°20′47″N 80°37′35″W
- Country: United States
- State: West Virginia
- County: Nicholas
- Time zone: UTC-5 (Eastern (EST))
  - Summer (DST): UTC-4 (EDT)
- GNIS feature ID: 1554197

Cottle is an unincorporated community in northeastern Nicholas County, West Virginia, United States. The town is located along West Virginia Route 20 at the foot of Cottle Knob in the area near Fire Tower Road.
