= Pool, West Virginia =

Pool
- Unincorporated community
- Location within the state of West Virginia Pool (the United States)
- Coordinates: 38°9′49″N 80°51′51″W
- Country: United States
- State: West Virginia
- County: Nicholas
- Time zone: UTC-5 (Eastern (EST))
  - Summer (DST): UTC-4 (EDT)
- ZIP codes: 26684

Pool is an unincorporated community in southwestern Nicholas County, West Virginia, United States. It lies along CR 41-7 just east of Route 41, south of the town of Summersville, the county seat of Nicholas County. Its elevation is 2,142 feet (653 m). Although Pool is unincorporated, it has a ZIP code of 26684; it once had its own post office, which opened on March 31, 1881, and closed on March 19, 2011. The community took its name from standing pool of water near the original town site.
