= Zela =

Zela may refer to:

- Battle of Zela, a 47 BC battle between Julius Caesar and Pharnaces II of The Kingdom of Pontus
- Battle of Zela (67 BC), a battle in the Third Mithridatic War
- Pilodeudorix zela, a butterfly of family Lycaenidae
- Zela language, a minor Bantu language of the Democratic Republic of Congo
- Zela (skipper), a genus of grass skippers

== Places ==
- Zela or Zelah, burial site of King Saul and his family in Israel
- Zela or Zile, a city and a district of Tokat Province, Turkey
  - Zela (titular see), a Roman Catholic titular see
- Zela, West Virginia

== People ==
- Adrián Zela (born 1989), Peruvian footballer
- Amarildo Zela (born 1972), Albanian footballer
- Vaçe Zela (1939–2014), Albanian singer

== See also ==
- Francisco Antonio de Zela (1786–1821), Peruvian revolutionary
- Zella (disambiguation)
