= Werth, West Virginia =

- Unincorporated community
- Location within West Virginia Location within the United States
- Coordinates: 38°21′18″N 80°45′14″W
- Country: United States
- State: West Virginia
- County: Nicholas
- Elevation: 1,975 ft (602 m)
- Time zone: UTC-5 (Eastern (EST))
  - Summer (DST): UTC-4 (EDT)
- Area codes: 304 & 681
- GNIS feature ID: 1553404

Werth is an unincorporated community in Nicholas County, West Virginia, United States. Werth is located on West Virginia Route 55, 7.5 miles (12.1 km) northeast of Summersville.
