= Holcomb, West Virginia =

- Unincorporated community
- Location within West Virginia Location within the United States
- Coordinates: 38°15′22″N 80°36′03″W
- Country: United States
- State: West Virginia
- County: Nicholas
- Elevation: 2,034 ft (620 m)
- Time zone: UTC-5 (Eastern (EST))
  - Summer (DST): UTC-4 (EDT)
- Area codes: 304 & 681
- GNIS feature ID: 1551471

Holcomb is an unincorporated community in Nicholas County, West Virginia, United States. Holcomb is located on state routes 20 and 55, 4.5 miles (7.2 km) northwest of Richwood.

Holcomb was named in honor of John Holcomb, a local merchant.
