= Leivasy, West Virginia =

- Unincorporated community
- Location within West Virginia Location within the United States
- Coordinates: 38°09′40″N 80°41′27″W
- Country: United States
- State: West Virginia
- County: Nicholas
- Elevation: 2,333 ft (711 m)
- Time zone: UTC-5 (Eastern (EST))
  - Summer (DST): UTC-4 (EDT)
- ZIP code: 26676
- Area codes: 304 & 681
- GNIS feature ID: 1554940

Leivasy is an unincorporated community in Nicholas County, West Virginia, United States. Leivasy is located on West Virginia Route 20, 9.5 miles (15.3 km) of Richwood. Leivasy has a post office with ZIP code 26676.

Vol Leivasy, an early postmaster, gave the community his name.
