= Zella =

Zella may refer to:

== Places ==
- Zella, Libya
- Zella (see), a Roman Catholic titular see in the Roman province of Byzacena (in modern Tunisia)
- Zella-Mehlis, a German town
- Zella/Rhön, a German municipality
- Altzella Abbey, a former monastery near Nossen, Germany
- Neuzelle a German municipality

== People ==
- Zella Day (born 1995), American singer
- Zella Allen Dixson (1858 – 1924), American author, lecturer, librarian, and publisher
- Zella Lehr (born 1951), an American singer and entertainer
- Zella McBerty (1879–1937), American businesswoman and engineer
- Zella de Milhau (1870–1954), American artist, ambulance driver, community organizer and motorcycle policewoman
- Zella Jackson Price (born c. 1940), American gospel singer
- Zella Russell (1883–1952), American vaudevillian star
- Zella Wolofsky (born 1947), Canadian modern dancer, researcher, columnist, and educator

== See also ==
- Altzellen, a community within Wolfenschiessen, Germany
- Zela (disambiguation)
