= Enon, West Virginia =

Unincorporated community in West Virginia, United States

- Unincorporated community
- Location within West Virginia Location within the United States
- Coordinates: 38°18′34″N 80°53′48″W
- Country: United States
- State: West Virginia
- County: Nicholas
- Elevation: 1,506 ft (459 m)
- Time zone: UTC-5 (Eastern (EST))
  - Summer (DST): UTC-4 (EDT)
- GNIS feature ID: 1538723

Enon is an unincorporated community in Nicholas County, West Virginia, United States. Its post office is closed.

The community most likely was named after Ænon, in Palestine, where John the Baptist baptized the people.
