= Swiss, West Virginia =

Swiss
- Unincorporated community
- Location within the state of West Virginia Swiss (the United States)
- Coordinates: 38°13′59″N 081°07′40″W
- Country: United States
- State: West Virginia
- County: Nicholas
- Time zone: UTC-5 (Eastern (EST))
  - Summer (DST): UTC-4 (EDT)
- ZIP code: 26731
- Area codes: 304 and 681

Swiss is an unincorporated community in western Nicholas County, West Virginia, United States. Its elevation is 735 ft (224 m).

Swiss is situated on the northern bank of the Gauley River, which also is border with Fayette County. The town is served by West Virginia Route 39.

== History ==
Swiss is located along Gauley River about ten miles upstream from Gauley Bridge and near the Southwest edge of Nicholas County. The Indians called Gauley River "Toki-biloki" falling creek. James Simms settled near Swiss about 1830. He brought with him a slave named Black Isaac. Isaac bought his freedom by making "gunwalen" on Sundays. He floated them down river to Kanawha Falls and sold them for $20 per set. After becoming free he purchased small property parcels in the area. He died circa 1880 on what became the Emil Scholl place during the 1930-1980 era.

Early land transfers included, in 1867, Henry Riggs conveying to Franklin P. Simms 125 acres of land near the mouth of Little Elk. In 1875, this tract was conveyed to William Simms and subsequently to Miletus Sims. In 1890, Robert M Hill conveyed 27.5 acres to John H Kunz, located one mile upriver from Little Elk Creek. In the same year, George Kincaid conveyed 27.5 acres that adjoined the Hill property to John H Kunz. In 2017, this land continues to be owned by Kun(t)z heirs.

The growth of the community and the tiresome trip to the Belva Post Office caused a request for a new Post Office to be submitted. They needed to submit three possible name choices and only had two. John Kunz joined the group and they jokingly said we will also submit "Swiss", because Kunz, who was an immigrant from Switzerland, always used that word after his name to distinguish from the Koontz (German) family at Kessler Cross Lane that also used the Belva Post Office. The Post Office Department chose the name "Swiss". Swiss received its name and Post Office in either 1904 [2] or 1908 [3].

Circa 1903, the Flynn Lumber Company bought several thousand acres of virgin timber on and around Swiss. They installed a major sawmill, a railroad, a company store and everything to facilitate the harvest of vast amounts of timber extending to Peter's Creek. The sawmill and company store were located about one-quarter mile up Little Elk Creek from Gauley River. This was also the terminus of the Kanawha and West Virginia Railroad from Charleston. The company store also served as ticket office, freight depot, and Post Office. Circa 1923, The Morgan Lumber Company leased land and the use of the Flynn Lumber Company railroad and harvested timber to meet their needs. Their small sawmill was located near the Flynn company store and the sawed lumber was transported to their Charleston Factory.[2]

The New York Central Railroad bought out the Kanawha and West Virginia Railroad and began passenger and freight service from Columbus, Ohio to Swiss. Several early coal mines operated; however, they failed to flourish as did several a short distance from Swiss. The Chesapeake and Ohio and the New York Central Railroads joined to form the Nicholas, Fayette, & Greenbrier Railroad (NF&G RR), which built a line from Swiss up river and thru Fayette and Greenbrier Counties to transport the coal and timber from those areas to Swiss and beyond.[2]The Flynn Lumber Company store burned during the period 1939-1941 and was not replaced.[3] Walter Simms, the Postmaster at that time, built a small concrete building just south of the intersection of Rt 39 and River Road. That became the location of the post office for many years.[2]

The first grist mill to grind wheat to flour, corn to corn meal, and other grains was at Kanawha Falls. Later, one of the Morris family built a mill near what is now Beech Glen. In 1890, John H. Kunz built and ran a water powered grist mill along Laurel Creek, approximately two miles from Swiss. It burned circa 1910.[2]

The first church in Nicholas County was built in 1824 and was near the present Simms Methodist Church. It was a meeting house for all people and denominations, who came from thirty miles in each direction across mountains and down valleys to worship. Services were held about once a month in summer and once each three months in the winter. This church burned before the Civil War. In 1867, another meeting house was built Up Little Elk near the school. This building burned. Later, a hall was built near the railroad station and school that was used for all community gatherings and religious services by Baptist, Methodist, Southern Methodist, and Presbyterian. In 1922, Moletist Simms gave land for a Methodist Church. The new building, with a 300 seating capacity opened in 1923 and remains active in 2017. A basement was constructed in 1928.[2]

Little Elk Creek, that traverses Swiss, was named by James Simms. Some of his friends lived on Elk River and when they visited James Simms they urged him to move over near their home. Simms said "Well sir, there is a creek near where I live with plenty of redbud and other flowers. I will just call it Little Elk and then I will not need to move." [2]
