= Mount Lookout, West Virginia =

Mt. Lookout, West Virginia
- Unincorporated community
- Location of Mt. Lookout in West Virginia Mt. Lookout, West Virginia (the United States)
- Coordinates: 38°10′00″N 80°54′42″W
- Country: United States
- State: West Virginia
- County: Nicholas
- Elevation: 1,965 ft (599 m)
- Time zone: UTC-5 (Eastern (EST))
  - Summer (DST): UTC-4 (EDT)
- ZIP code: 26678
- Area code: 304
- FIPS code: 54067
- GNIS feature ID: 1554804
- Other names: Flatlands; McClung Settlement; New Milton

Mt. Lookout is a small unincorporated community in Nicholas County, West Virginia, United States, 10 miles (16 km) south of Summersville.

Mount Lookout is located at 38°10′00″N 80°54′42″W (38.1667776, -80.9117644). It lies 1,965 feet (599 m) above sea level.

Mount Lookout's name is descriptive of the elevated town site.

Mount Lookout has a post office with the ZIP Code 26678. Post Office Box service is available as well as highway contract street delivery. As of 2016, there is (1) delivery route serving the community

Mount Lookout has (1) elementary school, Mt. Lookout Elementary, as well as a Head Start program. For many years there was (1) small general store, Kountry Mart, selling pop, bread, snacks, etc. Before that, a store called the Poke ‘N Tote served the area. Sometime prior to 2016, the Kountry Mart had been turned into apartments and a new Family Dollar store was constructed across the street. The area is served by the Wilderness Volunteer Fire Department. There is one Baptist church, Mt. Pleasant Missionary Baptist Church. There is a Kingdom Hall of Jehovah's Witnesses. There are a handful of vehicle mechanics in the community.

Mount Lookout is divided in half by US Route 19. The school, fire department, and the Kingdom Hall are on the eastern side of the highway while the Baptist church, Post Office, and Family Dollar are on the western side of the highway. The southern portion of the community is bordered by the Meadow River while the Summersville Lake recreational area is just north of the community.
