= Zela, West Virginia =

- Unincorporated community
- Location within West Virginia Location within the United States
- Coordinates: 38°17′09″N 80°56′59″W
- Country: United States
- State: West Virginia
- County: Nicholas
- Elevation: 1,270 ft (390 m)
- Time zone: UTC-5 (Eastern (EST))
  - Summer (DST): UTC-4 (EDT)
- Area codes: 304 & 681
- GNIS feature ID: 1549483

Zela is an unincorporated community in Nicholas County, West Virginia, United States. Zela is located on West Virginia Route 39, 5 miles (8.0 km) west of Summersville.

The community was named after Zela Alderson, the daughter of a local merchant.
