= Gauley River National Recreation Area =

Protected area in West Virginia, United States

- IUCN category V (protected landscape/seascape)
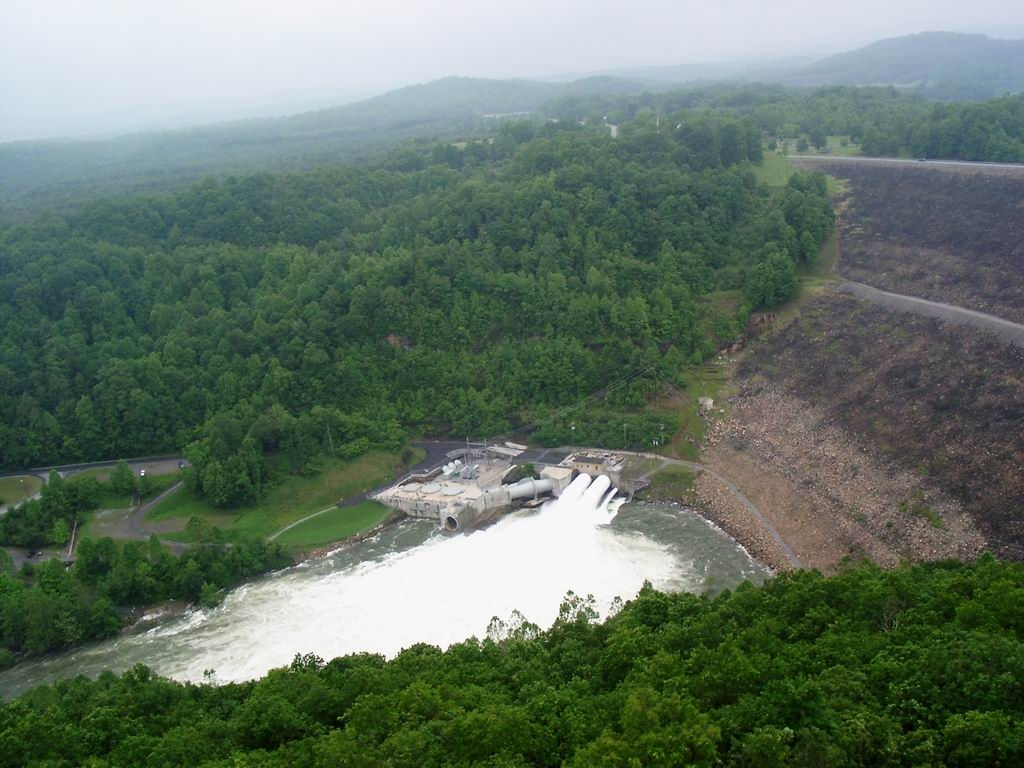
- Summersville Dam

- Location within West Virginia Location within the United States
- Location: West Virginia, United States
- Coordinates: 38°13′12″N 80°53′24″W
- Area: 11,507 acres (46.57 km^{2})
- Elevation: 1,375 ft (419 m)
- Established: 1988-10-26
- Visitors: 213,596 (in 2025)
- Operator: New River Gorge National River
- Website: Gauley River National Recreation Area

The Gauley River National Recreation Area, located near Summersville, West Virginia, protects a 25-mile (40 km) portion of the Gauley River and a 5.5-mile (8.9 km) segment of the Meadow River in southern West Virginia. Little of the national recreation area is accessible via roads; one must travel via the river. At the upstream end of the park is the Summersville Dam, the only area of the park accessible by vehicle.

== Rapids ==
Within the park are a number of Class V rapids. They have been given names such as:

- Insignificant
- Pillow Rock
- Lost Paddle
- Iron Ring
- Sweet's Falls
