= Richard Dixey =

English footballer (born 1956)

Personal information
- Date of birth: 2 September 1956 (age 70)
- Place of birth: Wigston, England
- Position: Central defender

Senior career*
Years	Team	Apps	(Gls)
19xx–1974	Enderby Town		
1974–1976	Burnley	3	(0)
1976	→ Stockport County (loan)	14	(1)
1976–1979	Kettering Town		
1979–1981	Scarborough		
1981–19xx	Nuneaton Borough		
- Atherstone United
- * Club domestic league appearances and goals

Richard Dixey (born 2 September 1956) is an English former professional footballer who played as a central defender. He began his career in amateur football before joining Burnley in 1974, although he failed to establish himself at the club and was later loaned out to Stockport County during the 1975–76 season. After being released by Burnley in the summer of 1976, Dixey moved into non-League football and represented a number of clubs including Kettering Town, where he was a losing FA Trophy finalist in 1979, Scarborough and Nuneaton Borough.

== Career ==
As a youth, Dixey represented his home county of Leicestershire at schoolboy level and played for local club Wigston Fields. In December 1974, while playing as an amateur for Southern Football League side Enderby Town, he was spotted by scouts from Burnley, who invited him to the club for a trial. He subsequently signed professional terms with the Football League First Division outfit after impressing manager Jimmy Adamson during his trial period. Dixey made his senior debut on 1 April 1975, deputising for the unavailable Jim Thomson in the 2–4 defeat away at Carlisle United. He played twice more during the remainder of the season; a 1–1 draw with Everton the following week and the 3–2 win against Tottenham Hotspur on 12 April 1975.

The latter proved to be Dixey's final game for Burnley as he was not selected during the 1975–76 campaign, eventually joining Fourth Division side Stockport County on loan for the rest of the season in February 1976. He made 14 appearances in total for the Edgeley Park club during his loan spell, scoring once, before being released on a free transfer by Burnley in May 1976. Dixey subsequently returned to Southern League football, signing for Kettering Town in August of that year. He spent three seasons with Kettering and in 1979 he was part of the team that reached the Final of the FA Trophy before losing 0–2 to Stafford Rangers at Wembley Stadium. Dixey transferred to Alliance Premier League (APL) side Scarborough ahead of the 1979–80 season and while there he came up against his former club Burnley in a 0–1 defeat in the First Round of the FA Cup on 22 November 1980.

In March 1981 Dixey switched clubs again, transferring to Nuneaton Borough, who paid Scarborough a fee of £9,500 for his services. Although the club was relegated from the APL shortly afterwards, he was an integral part of the team that won the Southern League Midland Division in 1981–82, thereby earning promotion back to the APL after only one season. He later became club captain as the side finished as runners-up in consecutive campaigns in 1983–84 and 1984–85, finishing behind Maidstone United and Wealdstone respectively. On 16 November 1985, Nuneaton faced Burnley in the FA Cup in the only competitive meeting between the two sides to date. However, Dixey again suffered defeat to his former club as Burnley, by then relegated to the Football League Fourth Division, won 3–2 at Manor Park. After several years with Nuneaton, Dixey transferred to Atherstone United, where he ended his playing career.

Dixey now teaches plumbing at Leicester College.

== Honours ==
Kettering Town

- FA Trophy runners-up: 1979

Nuneaton Borough

- Southern Football League Midland Division champions: 1981–82
- Alliance Premier League runners-up: 1983–84, 1984–85
