= Little Dixie =

Little Dixie may refer to:

== Regions ==
- Little Dixie (Missouri)
- Little Dixie (Oklahoma)

== Communities ==
- Little Dixie, Arkansas, an unincorporated community in Arkansas on the Woodruff-Prairie county line
- Little Dixie, Kentucky, also known as Dixiefield, in Henderson County, Kentucky

== Media ==
- Little Dixie (film), a 2023 American crime thriller film directed by John Swab
