= Dixie League =

"Dixie League" may refer to:

- Dixie League (American football), American professional football minor league, 1936-1947
- Dixie League (1916 baseball), class 'D' - minor league baseball league based in Alabama and Georgia, 1916-1917
- Dixie League (1933 baseball), class 'C' - minor league baseball league with teams in several U.S. states, 1933, which split into the
  - East Dixie League, 1934-1935
  - West Dixie League, 1934-1935
