= Dixie, Washington County, Oregon =

Coordinates: 45.730391°N 123.005385°W

Dixie is an unincorporated historic community in Washington County, Oregon, United States. Dixie post office was established five or six miles southwest of Scappoose in 1887, with John Dix as the first postmaster. The office was named for the Dix family and not for the U.S. South. The office closed in 1924, but when real estate was being sold in the area in 1933, a name for the locality was needed for marketing reasons. When a vote was held at a community picnic circa 1936 or 1937, 80 of the attendees chose the name "Dixie" to commemorate the former post office and its postmaster.
