= Dixie Land (film) =

2015 documentary film

- Directed by: Roman Bondarchuk
- Produced by: Ilona Bicevska
- Starring: Semen Nikolayevich Ryvkin; Polina Tarasenko; Roman Kupriyanov
- Edited by: Roman Bondarchuk
- Music by: Anton Baibakov
- Production company: Avantis Promo
- Release date: September 15, 2015
- Running time: 61 minutes
- Countries: Ukraine; Lithuania; Germany
- Language: Ukrainian

Dixie Land (alternatively spelled Dixieland, Ukrainian: «Діксіленд») is a 2015 Ukrainian documentary film.

== Synopsis ==
The documentary was filmed in the Ukrainian city of Kherson. The film follows four members of a children's orchestra (Roman, Polina, and two boys both named Nikita) who like to play American jazz music. The movie focuses on the children's strong connection with their grumpy but well-loved teacher, Semyon Nikolayevich Ryvkin.

== Cast ==
- Semen Nikolayevich Ryvkin
- Roman Kupriyanov
- Polina Tarasenko

== Release and Distribution ==
Dixie Land was directed, written, and edited by Roman Bondarchuk. Bondarchuk had gained acclaim as a documentary filmmaker thanks to his earlier films, such as Euromaidan and Ukrainian Sheriffs.

Dixie Land premiered in Ukraine in 2015. The film played at the Odesa International Film Festival where it won the Golden Duke award. The film was also featured at the Lielais Kristaps National Film Festival in Latvia in September 2015 and at the Full Frame Documentary Film Festival in the United States in April 2016. The film was also shown on television in Finland in March 2017.

== Reception ==
The Odessa Review said of the film, "Honestly, Dixie Land is the kind of powerful film that needs no introduction — it needs to be seen."
