= Cottle Knob =

Mountain peak in West Virginia, US

Coordinates: 38°21′37″N 80°38′49″W

Cottle Knob is a summit in West Virginia, in the United States. With an elevation of 3,031 feet (924 m), Cottle Knob is the 348th highest summit in the state of West Virginia.

Cottle Knob was named after C. W. Cottle, a pioneer hunter.
