= Dixi =

Dixi may refer to:

- Dixi, a Latin expression, literally translated as "I have spoken". When used, it usually means: "I have said all that I had to say and thus the argument is settled"
- Dixi, a trade name of the former German automobile manufacturer Automobilwerk Eisenach
- Deep Impact Extended Investigation, part of the EPOXI space exploration program using the Deep Impact spacecraft
- Dixi (TV series), an interactive BBC web mystery drama
- Dixi, a brand name for co-cyprindiol (cyproterone acetate/ethinylestradiol), an oral contraceptive
- Dixi Klo, nickname for a German brand of portable toilet houses TOI TOI & DIXI Sanitärsysteme
- Ground Opera (Chinese: 地戏; pinyin: dìxì), a type of Chinese opera originated in Anshun, Guizhou
- Dixi (building), a shopping centre, office building and transport hub in Vantaa, Finland

== See also ==
- Dixie (disambiguation)
- DIXY, a Russian grocery chain
