= Dixie High School =

Dixie High School may refer to various schools in the USA:

- Dixie High School (Ohio) — New Lebanon, Ohio
- Dixie High School (South Carolina) — Due West, South Carolina
- Dixie High School (Utah) — St. George, Utah
- Dixie High School (Washington) — Dixie, Washington

There is also a Dixie Heights High School in Edgewood, Kentucky (postal address Fort Mitchell).
