= Dixieland Historic District =

Historic district in Florida, United States

- U.S. National Register of Historic Places
- U.S. Historic district
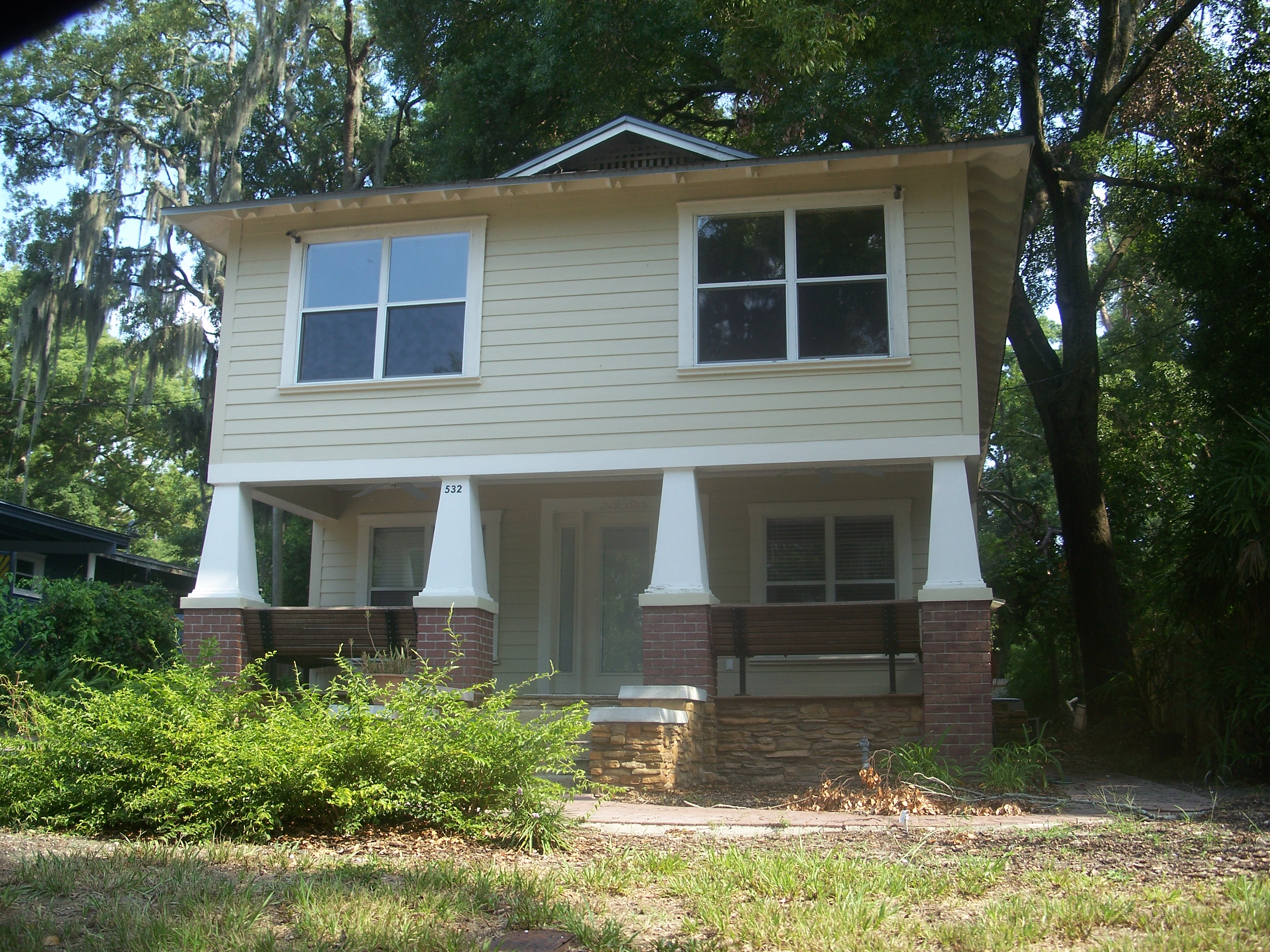

- Location within Florida Location within the United States
- Location: Lakeland, Florida
- Coordinates: 28°1′54″N 81°57′45″W
- Area: 3,000 acres (12 km^{2})
- Website: www.historicdixieland.com
- NRHP reference No.: 94001479
- Added to NRHP: December 23, 1994

The Dixieland Historic District is a United States historic district (designated as such on December 23, 1994) located in Lakeland, Florida. The district is bounded by Walnut Street, Florida Avenue, Lake Hunter, Hartsell Avenue and Belvedere Street. It contains 556 historic buildings.

The Dixieland Historic District in Lakeland, Florida was originally an area of 160 acres that was developed by Henry Bascum Carter and C. W. Deen in 1907. It was developed south of the downtown area. By 1910 a water system was installed. Local newspapers promoted the area as a "fashionable suburb". There was a housing boom in the 1920s and the 1940s.

Dixieland was accorded historic district status by the Lakeland City Commission in 1993. Lakeland issued regulations to preserve the heritage of Dixieland in the 1990s. Restoration efforts continue.
