= Dixieland Jazz (TV program) =

Canadian music television program

- Genre: Music
- Presented by: Trump Davidson
- Country of origin: Canada
- Original language: English
- No. of seasons: 1

Production
- Running time: 30 minutes

Original release
- Network: CBC Television
- Release: 21 April – 6 September 1954

Dixieland Jazz is a Canadian music television program that aired on CBC Television in 1954.

== Premise ==
The host was Trump Davidson, a cornet player. He also hosted a radio music program on CBC's Trans-Canada Network.

== Scheduling ==
This half-hour program was broadcast at various days and times from 21 April 1954 to 6 September 1954.
