= Dixie, Nicholas County, West Virginia =

Dixie, West Virginia
- Census-designated place (CDP)
- Location within West Virginia Location within the United States
- Coordinates: 38°15′03″N 81°11′35″W
- Country: United States
- State: West Virginia
- Counties: Fayette and Nicholas

Area
  - Total: 0.729 sq mi (1.89 km^{2})
  - Land: 0.729 sq mi (1.89 km^{2})
  - Water: 0 sq mi (0 km^{2})
- Elevation: 725 ft (221 m)

Population (2020)
  - Total: 227
  - Density: 311/sq mi (120/km^{2})
- Time zone: UTC-5 (Eastern (EST))
  - Summer (DST): UTC-4 (EDT)
- ZIP code: 25059
- Area codes: 304 & 681
- GNIS feature ID: 1538212

Dixie is a census-designated place (CDP) in Fayette and Nicholas counties, West Virginia, United States. Dixie is located on West Virginia Route 16, 5.5 miles (8.9 km) north of Gauley Bridge. Dixie has a post office with ZIP code 25059. As of the 2020 census, its population was 227 (down from 291 at the 2010 census), with 153 residents in Nicholas County and 74 in Fayette County.

The community was named after Dixie, a nickname for the Southern United States, because a share of the first settlers were southerners.
