= Persinger Creek =

Stream in West Virginia, U.S.

Coordinates: 38°17′56″N 80°46′11″W

Persinger Creek is a stream in the U.S. state of West Virginia.

Persinger Creek was named after the local Persinger family.

== See also ==
- List of rivers of West Virginia
