= Nicholas County, West Virginia =

County in West Virginia, United States

- County
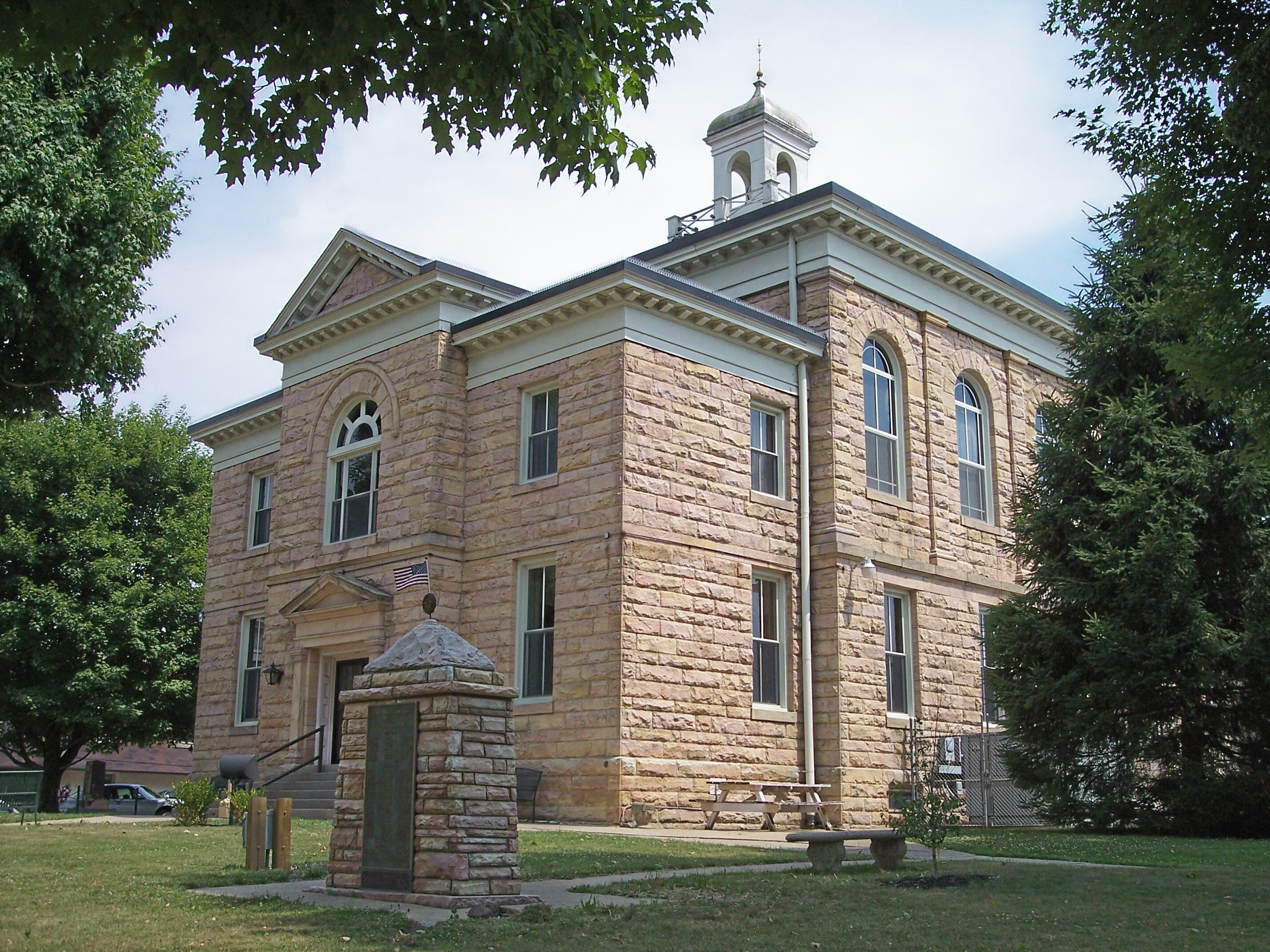
- The Nicholas County Courthouse in Summersville in 2007

- Seal

- Location within the U.S. state of West Virginia
- Coordinates: 38°17′N 80°48′W
- Country: United States
- State: West Virginia
- Founded: January 30, 1818
- Named for: Wilson Cary Nicholas
- Seat: Summersville
- Largest city: Summersville

Area
  - Total: 654 sq mi (1,690 km^{2})
  - Land: 647 sq mi (1,680 km^{2})
  - Water: 7.6 sq mi (20 km^{2}) 1.2%

Population (2020)
  - Total: 24,604
  - Estimate (2025): 23,848 ▼
  - Density: 38.0/sq mi (14.7/km^{2})
- Time zone: UTC−5 (Eastern)
  - Summer (DST): UTC−4 (EDT)
- Congressional district: 1st
- Website: www.nicholascountywv.org

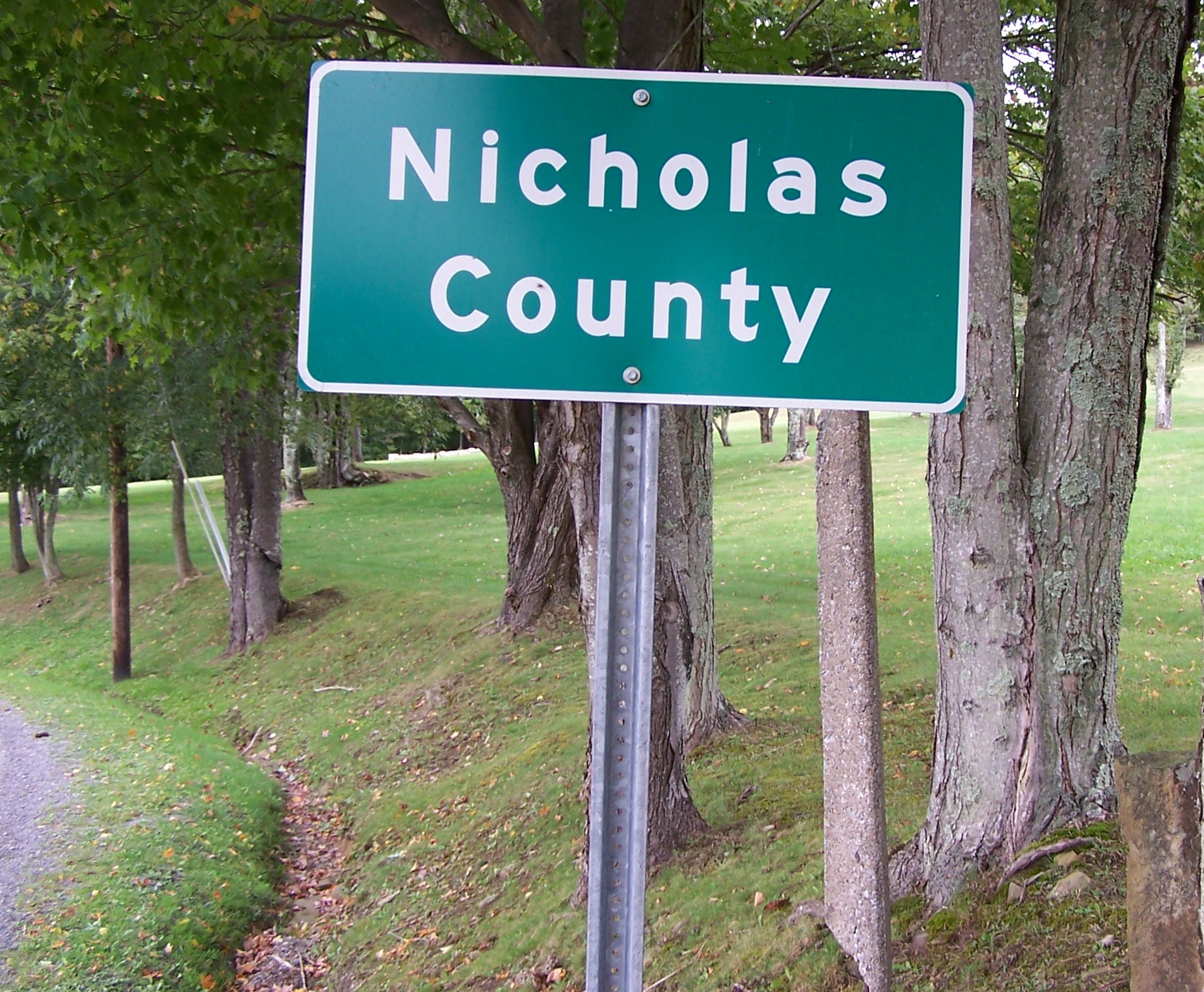
One of several markers designating the border between Nicholas and Greenbrier counties along Greenbrier Road near Richwood. Older stone survey markers are located a few feet behind the modern highway sign.

Nicholas County is a county located in the central region of U.S. state of West Virginia. As of the 2020 census, the population was 24,604. Its county seat is Summersville. The county was created in 1818 by the Virginia General Assembly and named for Virginia Governor Wilson Cary Nicholas.

== Geography ==
According to the United States Census Bureau, the county has a total area of 654 square miles (1,690 km^{2}), of which 647 square miles (1,680 km^{2}) is land and 7.6 square miles (20 km^{2}) (1.2%) is water.

In 1863, West Virginia's counties were divided into civil townships, with the intention of encouraging local government. This proved impractical in the heavily rural state, and in 1872 the townships were converted into magisterial districts. Nicholas County was divided into six districts: Grant, Jefferson, Kentucky, Mumble-the-peg, Summersville, and Wilderness. In 1873, Mumble-the-peg became Hamilton District. A seventh district, Beaver, was created in the 1880s.

=== Major highways ===
- U.S. Highway 19
- West Virginia Route 20
- West Virginia Route 39
- West Virginia Route 41
- West Virginia Route 55

=== Battlefields ===
Carnifex Ferry Battlefield, Keslers Cross Lanes

=== Adjacent counties ===
- Braxton County (north)
- Webster County (northeast)
- Greenbrier County (southeast)
- Fayette County (southwest)
- Clay County (northwest)
- Kanawha County (west)

=== National protected areas ===
- Gauley River National Recreation Area (part)
- Monongahela National Forest (part)

== Demographics ==
Historical population
Census	Pop.	Note	%±
1820	1,853		—
1830	3,346		80.6%
1840	2,515		−24.8%
1850	3,963		57.6%
1860	4,627		16.8%
1870	4,458		−3.7%
1880	7,223		62.0%
1890	9,309		28.9%
1900	11,403		22.5%
1910	17,699		55.2%
1920	20,717		17.1%
1930	20,686		−0.1%
1940	24,070		16.4%
1950	27,696		15.1%
1960	25,414		−8.2%
1970	22,552		−11.3%
1980	28,126		24.7%
1990	26,775		−4.8%
2000	26,562		−0.8%
2010	26,233		−1.2%
2020	24,604		−6.2%
2025 (est.)	23,848	▼	−3.1%
U.S. Decennial Census; 1790–1960 1900–1990; 1990–2000 2010–2020

=== 2020 census ===
As of the 2020 census, the county had a population of 24,604. Of the residents, 19.6% were under the age of 18 and 23.3% were 65 years of age or older; the median age was 46.9 years. For every 100 females there were 97.1 males, and for every 100 females age 18 and over there were 96.1 males.

The racial makeup of the county was 95.9% White, 0.2% Black or African American, 0.2% American Indian and Alaska Native, 0.3% Asian, 0.2% from some other race, and 3.2% from two or more races. Hispanic or Latino residents of any race comprised 0.7% of the population.

There were 10,630 households in the county, of which 25.0% had children under the age of 18 living with them and 25.9% had a female householder with no spouse or partner present. About 30.5% of all households were made up of individuals and 15.3% had someone living alone who was 65 years of age or older.

There were 12,496 housing units, of which 14.9% were vacant. Among occupied housing units, 79.3% were owner-occupied and 20.7% were renter-occupied. The homeowner vacancy rate was 1.7% and the rental vacancy rate was 9.2%.

Nicholas County, West Virginia – Racial and ethnic composition Note: the US Census treats Hispanic/Latino as an ethnic category. This table excludes Latinos from the racial categories and assigns them to a separate category. Hispanics/Latinos may be of any race.
Race / Ethnicity (NH = Non-Hispanic)	Pop 2000	Pop 2010	Pop 2020	% 2000	% 2010	% 2020
White alone (NH)	26,170	25,688	23,525	98.52%	97.92%	95.61%
Black or African American alone (NH)	10	42	56	0.04%	0.16%	0.23%
Native American or Alaska Native alone (NH)	64	51	44	0.24%	0.19%	0.18%
Asian alone (NH)	50	69	72	0.19%	0.26%	0.29%
Pacific Islander alone (NH)	6	6	7	0.02%	0.02%	0.03%
Other race alone (NH)	2	2	15	0.01%	0.01%	0.06%
Mixed race or Multiracial (NH)	133	229	712	0.50%	0.87%	2.89%
Hispanic or Latino (any race)	127	146	173	0.48%	0.56%	0.70%
Total	26,562	26,233	24,604	100.00%	100.00%	100.00%

=== 2010 census ===
As of the 2010 United States census, there were 26,233 people, 10,938 households, and 7,591 families living in the county. The population density was 40.6 inhabitants per square mile (15.7/km^{2}). There were 13,064 housing units at an average density of 20.2 units per square mile (7.8 units/km^{2}). The racial makeup of the county was 98.4% white, 0.3% Asian, 0.2% American Indian, 0.2% black or African American, 0.1% from other races, and 0.9% from two or more races. Those of Hispanic or Latino origin made up 0.6% of the population. In terms of ancestry, 21.7% were Irish, 19.0% were German, 12.9% were English, and 10.1% were American.

Of the 10,938 households, 28.8% had children under the age of 18 living with them, 53.8% were married couples living together, 10.7% had a female householder with no husband present, 30.6% were non-families, and 26.5% of all households were made up of individuals. The average household size was 2.38 and the average family size was 2.85. The median age was 43.3 years.

The median income for a household in the county was $38,457 and the median income for a family was $45,127. Males had a median income of $42,302 versus $25,859 for females. The per capita income for the county was $19,359. About 14.3% of families and 18.7% of the population were below the poverty line, including 25.5% of those under age 18 and 12.3% of those age 65 or over.

=== 2000 census ===
As of the census of 2000, there were 26,562 people, 10,722 households, and 7,762 families living in the county. The population density was 41 people per square mile (16 people/km^{2}). There were 12,406 housing units at an average density of 19 units per square mile (7.3 units/km^{2}). The racial makeup of the county was 98.84% White, 0.05% Black or African American, 0.24% Native American, 0.19% Asian, 0.02% Pacific Islander, 0.10% from other races, and 0.55% from two or more races. 0.48% of the population were Hispanic or Latino of any race.

There were 10,722 households, out of which 30.70% had children under the age of 18 living with them, 58.70% were married couples living together, 10.00% had a female householder with no husband present, and 27.60% were non-families. 24.80% of all households were made up of individuals, and 11.80% had someone living alone who was 65 years of age or older. The average household size was 2.46 and the average family size was 2.91.

In the county, the population was spread out, with 23.30% under the age of 18, 8.10% from 18 to 24, 27.60% from 25 to 44, 26.00% from 45 to 64, and 15.00% who were 65 years of age or older. The median age was 39 years. For every 100 females there were 95.60 males. For every 100 females age 18 and over, there were 92.20 males.

The median income for a household in the county was $26,974, and the median income for a family was $32,074. Males had a median income of $30,508 versus $17,964 for females. The per capita income for the county was $15,207. About 15.00% of families and 19.20% of the population were below the poverty line, including 25.40% of those under age 18 and 13.80% of those age 65 or over.

== Politics ==
United States presidential election results for Nicholas County, West Virginia
Year	Republican		Democratic		Third party(ies)	
Year	No.	%	No.	%	No.	%
1912	584	14.40%	2,018	49.75%	1,454	35.85%
1916	2,056	44.77%	2,467	53.72%	69	1.50%
1920	3,691	50.53%	3,564	48.79%	50	0.68%
1924	3,347	45.02%	3,956	53.21%	131	1.76%
1928	3,917	52.36%	3,495	46.72%	69	0.92%
1932	3,684	40.50%	5,327	58.56%	86	0.95%
1936	3,964	40.02%	5,872	59.28%	70	0.71%
1940	4,299	44.73%	5,312	55.27%	0	0.00%
1944	3,259	43.09%	4,305	56.91%	0	0.00%
1948	3,391	40.22%	5,018	59.51%	23	0.27%
1952	4,386	43.86%	5,615	56.14%	0	0.00%
1956	5,263	51.89%	4,880	48.11%	0	0.00%
1960	4,297	42.67%	5,774	57.33%	0	0.00%
1964	2,628	27.65%	6,878	72.35%	0	0.00%
1968	3,678	39.22%	4,858	51.81%	841	8.97%
1972	5,907	61.95%	3,628	38.05%	0	0.00%
1976	3,462	35.70%	6,235	64.30%	0	0.00%
1980	3,885	40.83%	5,265	55.33%	366	3.85%
1984	4,656	50.21%	4,588	49.48%	29	0.31%
1988	3,731	41.75%	5,173	57.89%	32	0.36%
1992	2,959	31.05%	5,042	52.91%	1,528	16.04%
1996	2,649	31.03%	4,769	55.87%	1,118	13.10%
2000	4,359	50.81%	4,059	47.31%	161	1.88%
2004	5,485	52.99%	4,788	46.26%	78	0.75%
2008	4,804	51.32%	4,357	46.54%	200	2.14%
2012	5,898	67.09%	2,664	30.30%	229	2.60%
2016	7,251	75.70%	1,840	19.21%	488	5.09%
2020	8,279	77.86%	2,226	20.93%	128	1.20%
2024	7,960	79.31%	1,919	19.12%	158	1.57%

=== Elected officials ===
Position	Elected Official
Nicholas County Commission	Garrett Cole, President; Lloyd Adkins; D. Craig Chapman
Nicholas County Assessor	Ernie Dennison
Nicholas County Circuit Clerk	Debbie Facemire
Nicholas County Clerk	Robert Painter
Nicholas County Prosecutor	Jonathan Sweeney
Nicholas County Sheriff	William Nunley

== Communities ==
=== Cities ===
- Richwood
- Summersville (county seat)

=== Magisterial districts ===
- Beaver
- Grant
- Hamilton
- Jefferson
- Kentucky
- Summersville
- Wilderness

=== Census-designated places ===
- Belva
- Birch River
- Craigsville
- Dixie
- Fenwick
- Nettie
- Tioga

=== Unincorporated communities ===
- Bentree
- Calvin
- Cambria
- Canvas
- Cottle
- Drennen
- Enon
- Gilboa
- Holcomb
- Hookersville
- Kesslers Cross Lanes
- Leivasy
- Lockwood
- Mount Nebo
- Mount Lookout
- Muddlety
- New Hope
- Odell Town
- Persinger
- Pool
- Swiss
- Werth
- Zela

== See also ==
- Carnifex Ferry Battlefield State Park
- National Register of Historic Places listings in Nicholas County, West Virginia
- Nicholas County Schools
