= Dixie, Newton County, Georgia =

Dixie, Georgia
- Unincorporated community
- Location within Georgia
- Coordinates: 33°34′24″N 83°46′13″W
- Country: United States
- State: Georgia
- County: Newton
- Elevation: 764 ft (233 m)
- Time zone: UTC-5 (Eastern (EST))
  - Summer (DST): UTC-4 (EDT)
- Area codes: 678 & 470
- GNIS feature ID: 331561

Dixie is an unincorporated community in Newton County, Georgia, United States, on Georgia State Route 142 5.4 miles (8.7 km) east-southeast of Covington.

The community was named after Dixie, a nickname for the southeastern United States.
