= Dixie, Harrison County, West Virginia =

Unincorporated community in West Virginia, United States

- Unincorporated community
- Location within West Virginia Location within the United States
- Coordinates: 39°25′10″N 80°19′48″W
- Country: United States
- State: West Virginia
- County: Harrison
- Elevation: 968 ft (295 m)
- Time zone: UTC-5 (Eastern (EST))
  - Summer (DST): UTC-4 (EDT)
- Area codes: 304 & 681
- GNIS feature ID: 1956492

Dixie is an unincorporated community in Harrison County, West Virginia, United States. Dixie is 2 miles (3.2 km) northwest of Shinnston.
