= Dixie Hills, Nevada =

Mountain range in Nevada, United States

Dixie Hills
- Location within Nevada

Highest point
- Elevation: 1,830 m (6,000 ft)

Geography
- Country: United States
- State: Nevada
- District: Elko County
- Range coordinates: 40°30′44.736″N 115°49′38.231″W
- Topo map: USGS Red Spring

The Dixie Hills are a mountain range in Elko County, Nevada.
