= Dixy =

Russian retail company

Dixy Group
- Native name: Группа Компаний ДИКСИ
- Type: Private
- Industry: Retail
- Founded: 1992
- Headquarters: Moscow, Russia
- Key people: (Chairman); Yuri Semenov (CEO)
- Products: Food and general merchandise
- Revenue: $4.85 billion (2017)
- Operating income: $29.6 million (2016)
- Net income: −$6.57 million (2016)
- Total equity: $476 million (2016)
- Number of employees: 26,000+
- Parent: JSC Tander

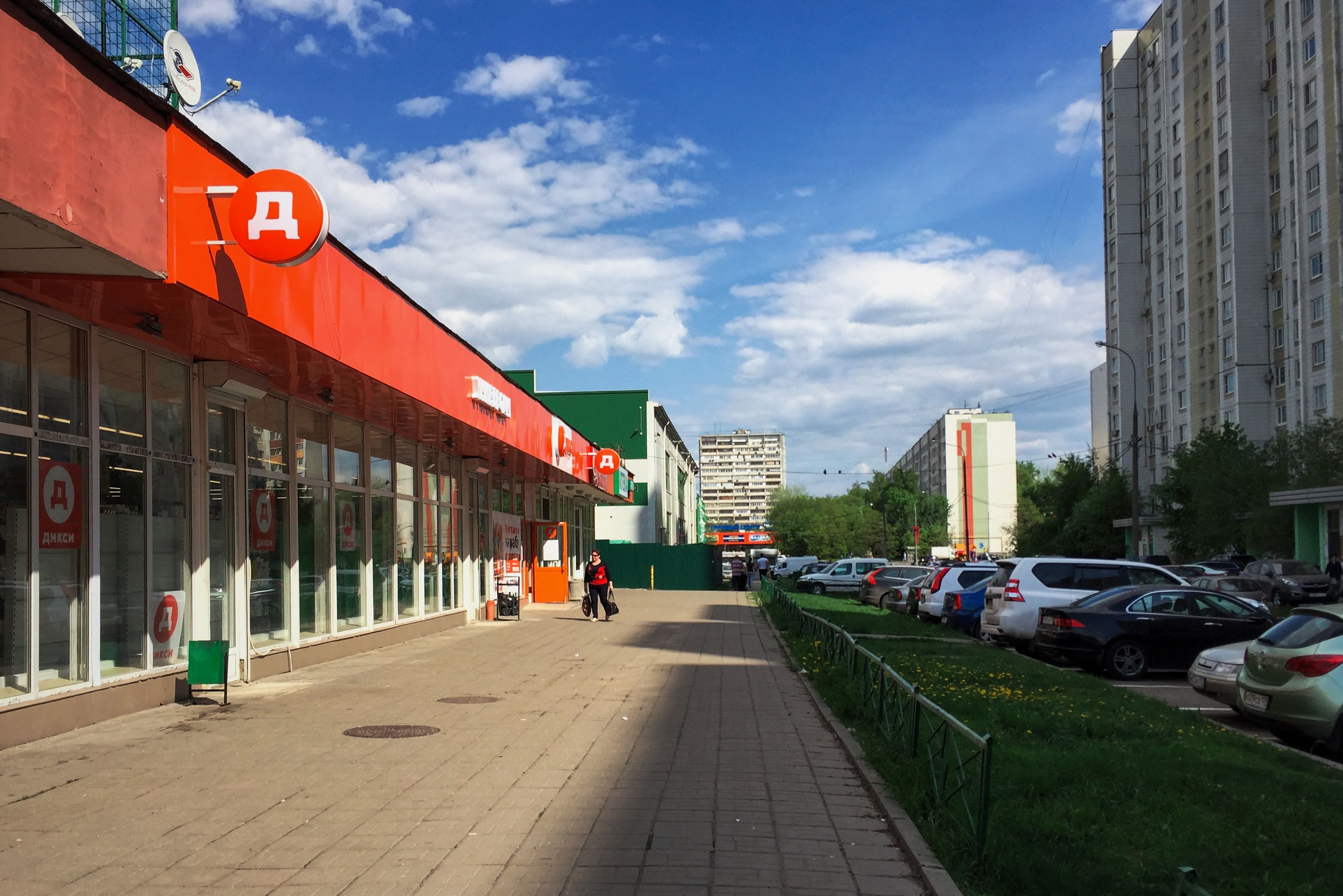
Dixy Store in Moscow, Central Russia

Dixy (Дикси) is Russia's third largest food retail company. The Moscow-based company and its subsidiaries specialize in the sale of food and everyday products. Dixy is a subsidiary of Dkbr Mega Retail Group Limited.

Dixy's main competitors are X5 Group, Magnit, Metro AG, Auchan and others.

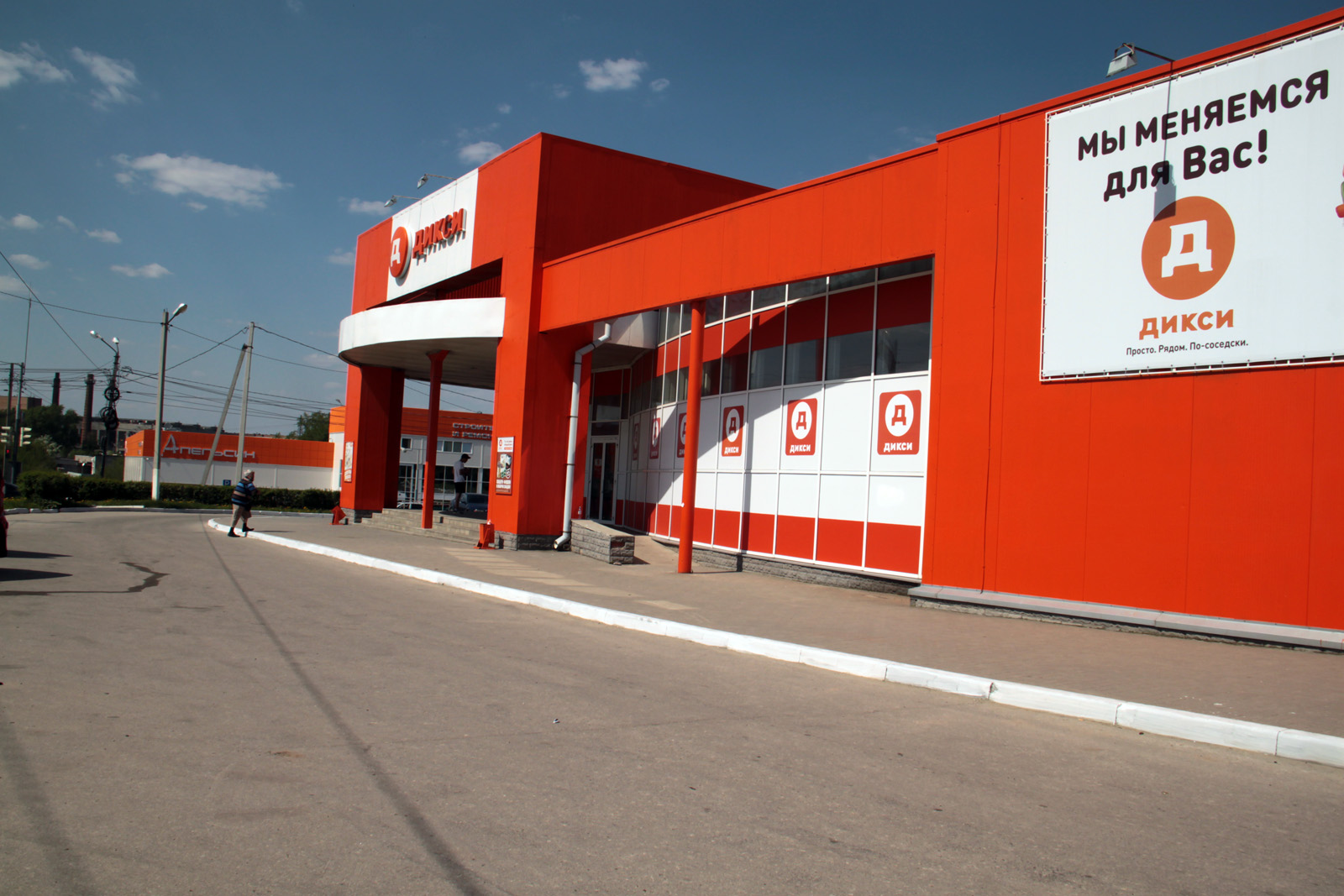
Dixy store in Ryazan, Central Russia

== History ==
The company was founded in 1992 in Saint Petersburg. In 1999, the first store opened in Moscow and began expanding into other regions of the country.

The company delisted from the Moscow Exchange in 2017.

As of September 30, 2017, Dixy had 2,704 stores.

On July 22, 2021, PJSC Magnit completed the purchase of the Dixy retail chain, which manages 2,477 stores in Russia. The brand was retained, and the business continued to operate as a separate legal entity. In 2022, the company's revenue in Russia amounted to 107 million rubles.

== Stores and assets ==
As of January 2023, the Group operated 2,650 stores, including 2,209 Dixy discounters and 441 First Business franchisees. The Group's activities span three federal districts of Russia: Central, Northwestern, and Far East.

The company's staff as of January 2023 is about 26,000 people.

== Operation ==
As of January 16, 2023, the Group operated 2,650 stores, including 2,209 Dixie discounters and 441 First-Time franchisees.

The geography of the Group's activities extends to three federal districts of Russia — the Central, Northwestern (discounters "Dixie"), and the Far Eastern (franchisees "First thing").

The company's employee count in January 2023 was about 26,000.

== Owners and management ==
The founder of Dixy is entrepreneur Oleg Leonov.

100% of the shares of Dixy Holding Limited (Cyprus) are owned by JSC "Tunder".

The Chief Executive Officer is Yuri Semenov.

Since 2015 Sergey Belyakov is the CEO.
