= Summersville, West Virginia =

- City
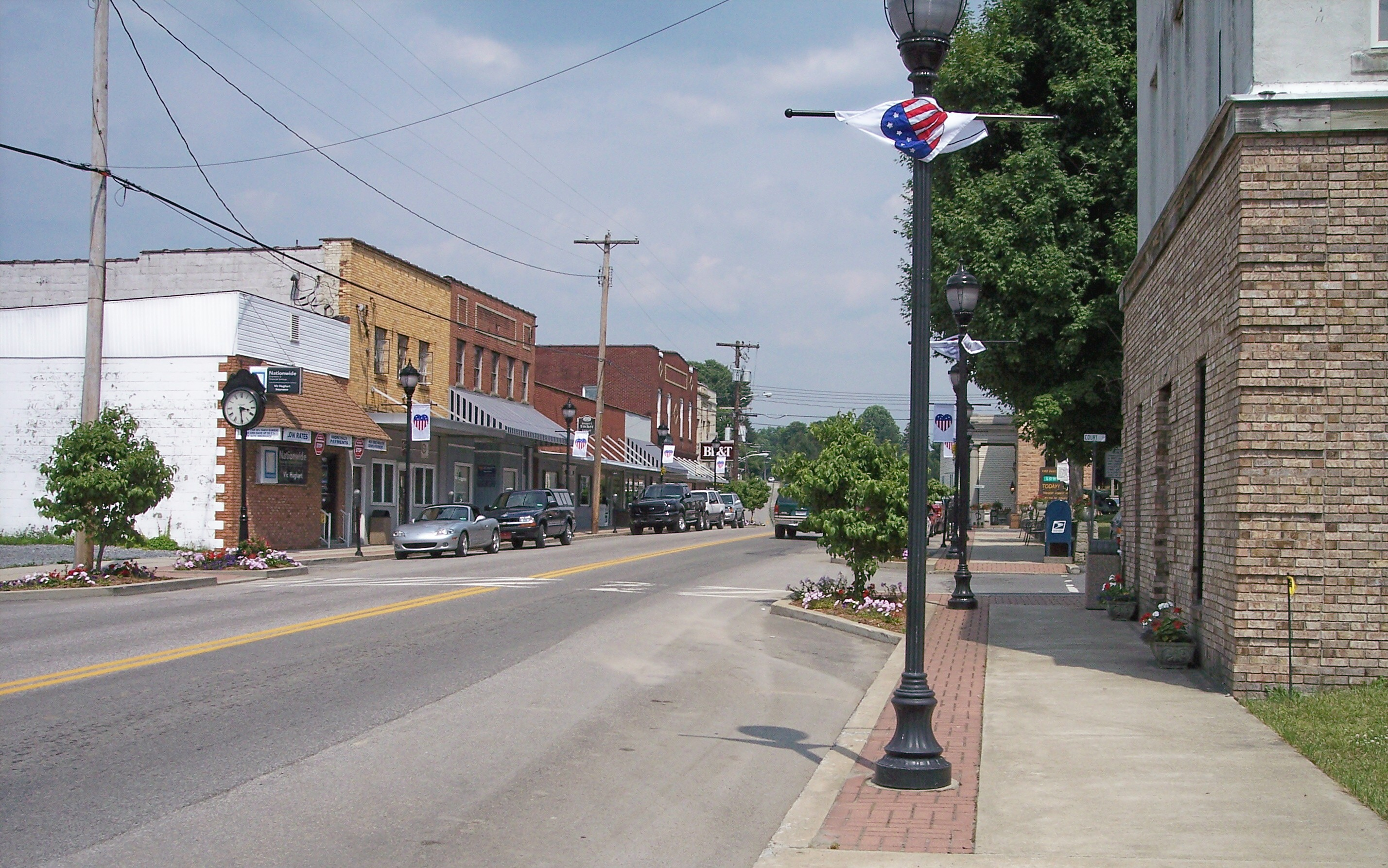
- Main Street (West Virginia Route 41) in downtown Summersville in 2007

- Flag Logo
- Nickname: The World's Largest Speed Trap
- Interactive map of Summersville, West Virginia
- Location within West Virginia Location within the United States
- Coordinates: 38°17′0″N 80°50′39″W
- Country: United States
- State: West Virginia
- County: Nicholas
- Established: 1824
- Incorporated: 1897

Government
  - Mayor: David Harper

Area
  - Total: 4.53 sq mi (11.73 km^{2})
  - Land: 4.49 sq mi (11.62 km^{2})
  - Water: 0.042 sq mi (0.11 km^{2})
- Elevation: 1,880 ft (573 m)

Population (2020)
  - Total: 3,431
  - Estimate (2021): 3,408
  - Density: 729.7/sq mi (281.75/km^{2})
- Time zone: UTC-5 (Eastern (EST))
  - Summer (DST): UTC-4 (EDT)
- ZIP code: 26651
- Area codes: 304, 681
- FIPS code: 54-77980
- GNIS feature ID: 1547739
- Website: Official website

Summersville is a city in Nicholas County, West Virginia, United States. The population was 3,459 at the 2020 census. It is the county seat of Nicholas County.

== History ==
Summersville was laid out in 1824. The city was named for Lewis Summers, a local judge who had introduced the bill to create Nicholas County.

Summersville was home to both Union and Confederate encampments during the Civil War. The town was mostly burned down by the Confederate spy Nancy Hart Douglas during the war. The town was rebuilt by 1884.

In 1914, Nicholas County High School was established, then located downtown in the "Old Main". More buildings were built on the campus to house the growing student body until a new building north of town was finished in 1978.

Construction on Summersville Dam began in 1960 and was finished and dedicated by President Lyndon Baines Johnson in 1966.

Since the upgrade of US-19 through Summersville from a two lane highway to a four lane highway, the city has become the economic center of Nicholas County. The road is commonly used by northern travelers as a shortcut to the south.

Summersville is home to the annual Potato Festival.

On June 23, 2016, flooding impacted Summersville. This resulted in Summersville Middle School being demolished and relocated to a modular setting after flood waters damaged the school. Ground was broken on a new campus for Summersville Middle School, Nicholas County High School, and the Nicholas County Career and Technical Center on June 2, 2020.

== Geography ==
Summersville is located at 38°17′0″N 80°50′39″W (38.283342, -80.844207). It is located just north of the Gauley River which is famous for its challenging whitewater. The river is impounded by a large dam which creates Summersville Lake, creating flatwater recreation as well.

According to the United States Census Bureau, the town has a total area of 4.26 square miles (11.03 km^{2}), of which 4.22 square miles (10.93 km^{2}) is land and 0.04 square miles (0.10 km^{2}) is water.

=== Climate ===
The climate in this area has mild differences between highs and lows, and there is adequate rainfall year-round. According to the Köppen Climate Classification system, Summersville has a marine west coast climate, abbreviated "Cfb" on climate maps.

== Demographics ==
Historical population
Census	Pop.	Note	%±
1880	165		—
1900	223		—
1910	204		−8.5%
1920	279		36.8%
1930	536		92.1%
1940	643		20.0%
1950	1,628		153.2%
1960	2,008		23.3%
1970	2,429		21.0%
1980	2,972		22.4%
1990	2,906		−2.2%
2000	3,294		13.4%
2010	3,572		8.4%
2020	3,431		−3.9%
2021 (est.)	3,408		−0.7%
U.S. Decennial Census

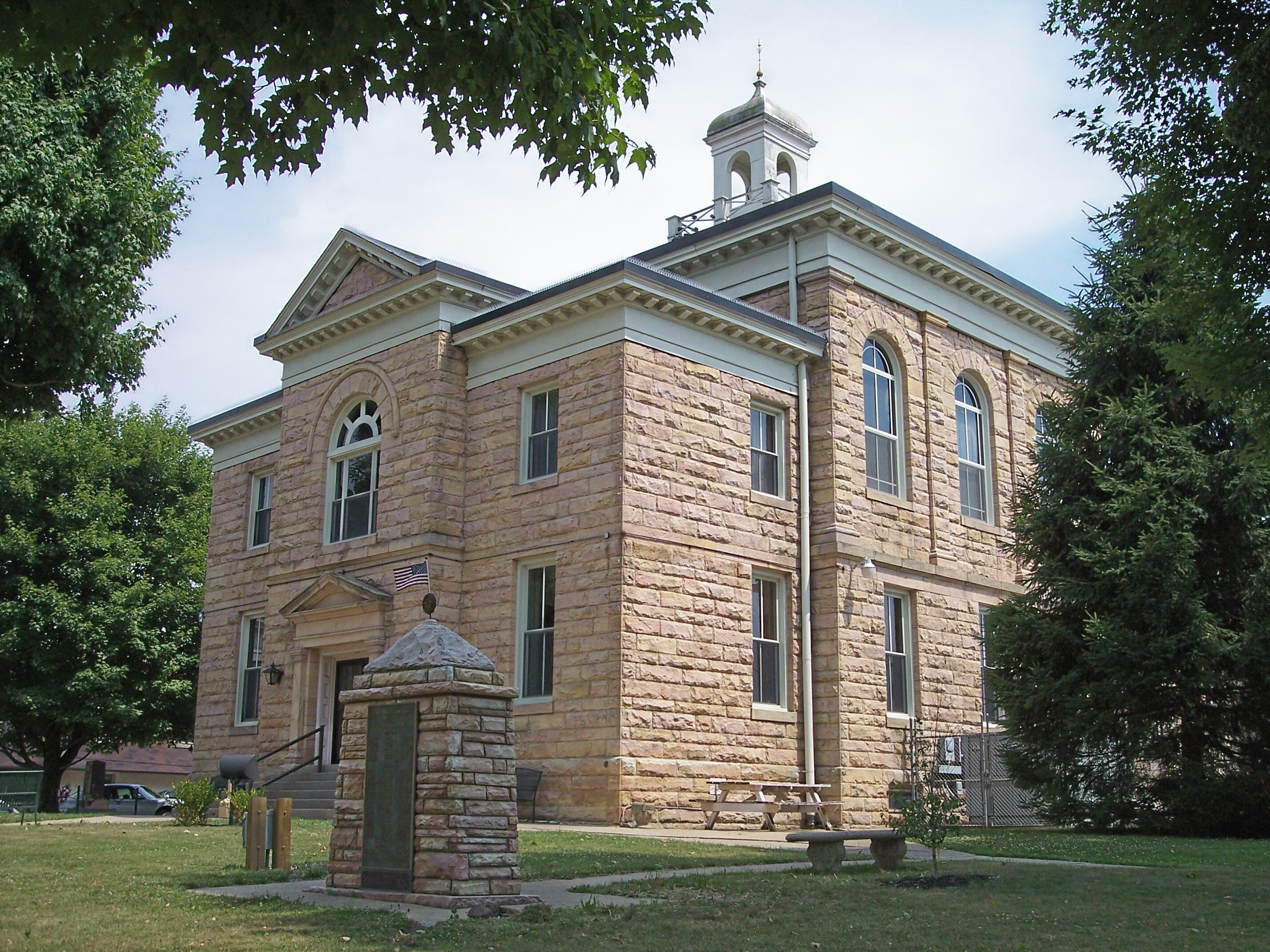
Nicholas County Courthouse in 2007

=== 2020 census ===
As of the 2020 census, Summersville had a population of 3,431. The median age was 47.1 years. 18.5% of residents were under the age of 18 and 24.9% of residents were 65 years of age or older. For every 100 females there were 90.4 males, and for every 100 females age 18 and over there were 86.1 males age 18 and over.

0.0% of residents lived in urban areas, while 100.0% lived in rural areas.

There were 1,596 households in Summersville, of which 24.2% had children under the age of 18 living in them. Of all households, 39.9% were married-couple households, 20.1% were households with a male householder and no spouse or partner present, and 33.5% were households with a female householder and no spouse or partner present. About 38.7% of all households were made up of individuals and 18.7% had someone living alone who was 65 years of age or older.

There were 1,737 housing units, of which 8.1% were vacant. The homeowner vacancy rate was 1.6% and the rental vacancy rate was 7.4%.

Racial composition as of the 2020 census
Race	Number	Percent
White	3,244	94.5%
Black or African American	16	0.5%
American Indian and Alaska Native	9	0.3%
Asian	27	0.8%
Native Hawaiian and Other Pacific Islander	3	0.1%
Some other race	6	0.2%
Two or more races	126	3.7%
Hispanic or Latino (of any race)	39	1.1%

=== 2010 census ===
As of the census of 2010, there were 3,572 people, 1,640 households, and 974 families living in the town. The population density was 846.4 inhabitants per square mile (326.8/km^{2}). There were 1,761 housing units at an average density of 417.3 per square mile (161.1/km^{2}). The racial makeup of the town was 97.4% White, 0.4% African American, 0.3% Native American, 0.9% Asian, 0.3% from other races, and 0.7% from two or more races. Hispanic or Latino of any race were 1.4% of the population.

There were 1,640 households, of which 26.3% had children under the age of 18 living with them, 42.1% were married couples living together, 13.6% had a female householder with no husband present, 3.7% had a male householder with no wife present, and 40.6% were non-families. 36.8% of all households were made up of individuals, and 14.9% had someone living alone who was 65 years of age or older. The average household size was 2.14 and the average family size was 2.77.

The median age in the town was 43 years. 20.4% of residents were under the age of 18; 7.9% were between the ages of 18 and 24; 24.2% were from 25 to 44; 30.4% were from 45 to 64; and 17.1% were 65 years of age or older. The gender makeup of the town was 46.8% male and 53.2% female.

=== 2000 census ===
The median income for a household in the town was $29,783, and the median income for a family was $43,314. Males had a median income of $33,633 versus $22,348 for females. The per capita income for the town was $23,217. About 6.9% of families and 12.7% of the population were below the poverty line, including 8.1% of those under age 18 and 11.2% of those age 65 or over.

=== Economy ===
As of 2018 Summersville has been home to a major economical increase due to a 303 mi 42in. natural gas pipeline running through eastern Nicholas county, bringing in close to 1,000 more people to the county generating more revenue for businesses, Lodging and much more.

== Parks and recreation ==
Summersville is a qualified Tree City USA as recognized by the National Arbor Day Foundation.

== Education ==
Summersville is served by the Nicholas County Board of Education, which operates three schools, Summersville Elementary School, Summersville Middle School (Summersville Junior High School until 2006), and Nicholas County High School, in Summersville.

Summersville is also home to New Life Christian Academy, a private school.

New River Community and Technical College maintains a campus in Summersville.

== Popular culture ==
- Summersville and surrounding locations are featured in the 2018 video game Fallout 76

== Notable people ==
- Buzz Nutter, NFL Center and Linebacker, 2× NFL champion (1958, 1959), Virginia Tech Sports Hall of Fame (1985)

== See also ==
- Summersville Lake
- Gauley River National Recreation Area
