= 1968 West Virginia House of Delegates election =

- November 5, 1968

All 100 seats in the West Virginia House of Delegates 51 seats needed for a majority
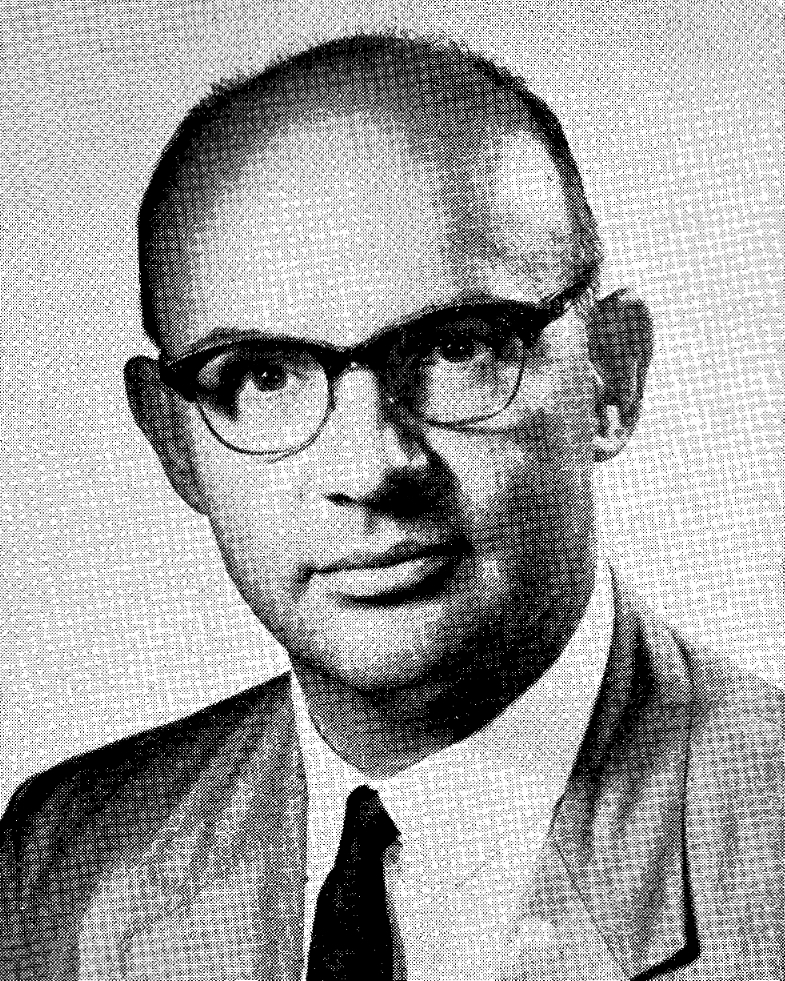

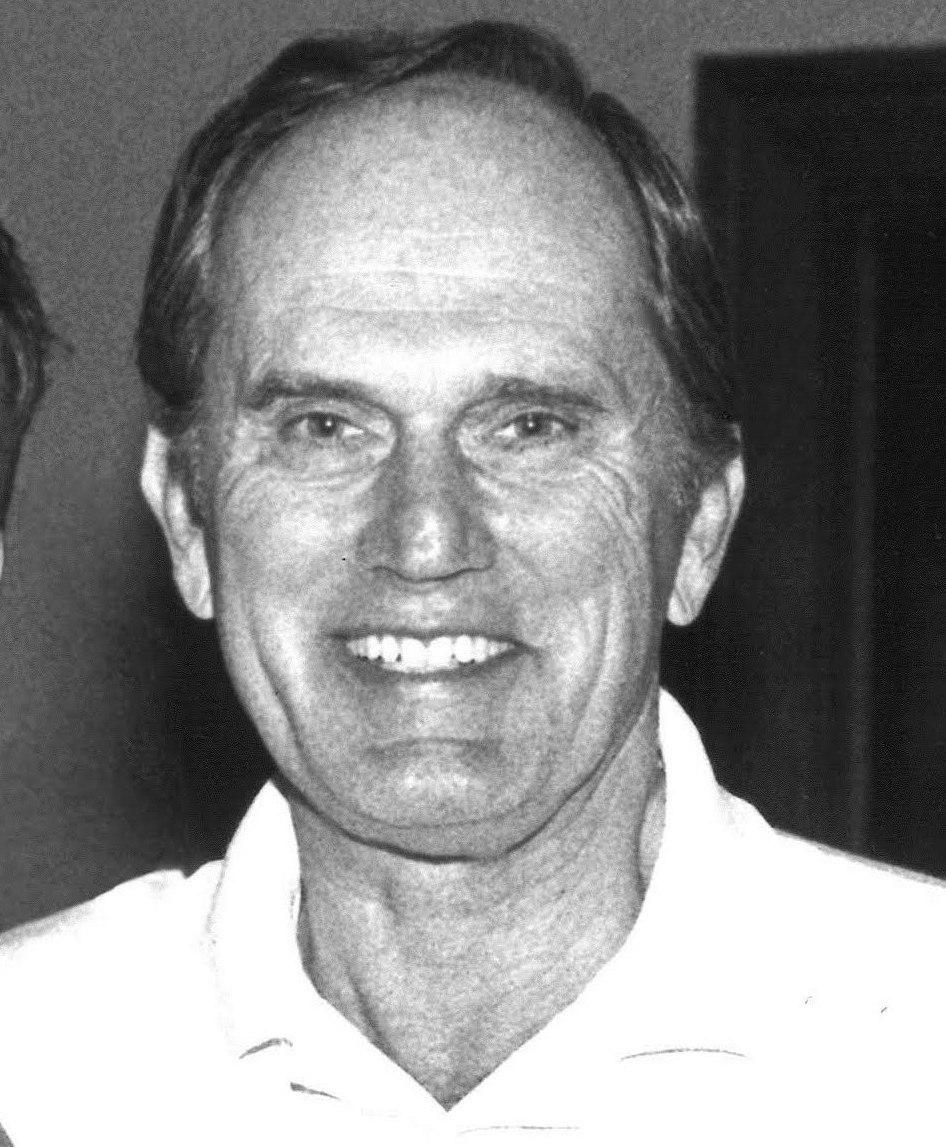
	Majority party	Minority party
Leader	H. Laban White (retired)	Brereton C. Jones (retired)
Party	Democratic	Republican
Leader since	1965	1967
Leader's seat	Harrison Co.	Mason Co.
Last election	65 seats	35 seats
Seats won	63	37
Seat change	▼2	▲2
Popular vote	1,449,004	1,275,201
Percentage	53.19%	46.81%
- Democratic gain Democratic hold Republican gain Republican hold Democratic: 50–60% 60–70% 70–80% 80–90% 90–100% Republican: 50–60% 60–70% 90–100%
Speaker before election
H. Laban White
Democratic
Elected Speaker
Ivor F. Boiarsky
Democratic

Elections to the West Virginia House of Delegates were held on November 5, 1968, to elect 100 candidates to the House to serve a two-year term. The Republican Party gained a net total of two seats in the chamber, reducing the Democrats' majority to 63 seats.

At the opening of the 59th Legislature, Republicans elected former minority leader George H. Seibert back to the position to succeed outgoing delegate Brereton C. Jones, and Democrat Ivor F. Boiarsky was elected speaker.

This election used the map first drawn for the 1964 general election, using plurality block voting in districts with multiple delegates.

== District 1 ==
District 1 election 2 to be elected
Party	Candidate	Votes	%
Republican	Wallace L. Files (incumbent)	9,144	27.76%
Republican	Ward W. Keesecker	8,613	26.14%
Democratic	Robert M. Steptoe (incumbent)	8,314	25.24%
Democratic	Ralph B. Hovermale	6,874	20.87%
Total votes		32,945	100.00%
Republican gain from Democratic			

== District 2 ==
District 2 election 1 to be elected
Party	Candidate	Votes	%
Republican	Larkin B. Ours (incumbent)	4,812	100.00%
Total votes		4,812	100.00%
Republican hold			

== District 3 ==
District 3 election 1 to be elected
Party	Candidate	Votes	%
Democratic	Thomas J. Hawse (incumbent)	4,604	100.00%
Total votes		4,604	100.00%
Democratic hold			

== District 4 ==
District 4 election 2 to be elected
Party	Candidate	Votes	%
Democratic	Thomas C. Edgar (incumbent)	10,061	37.63%
Democratic	Richard H. Bowman (incumbent)	9,594	35.89%
Republican	Thomas B. Freeman	7,080	26.48%
Total votes		26,735	100.00%
Democratic hold			

== District 5 ==
District 5 election 1 to be elected
Party	Candidate	Votes	%
Republican	Forrest M. Buck (incumbent)	5,107	100.00%
Total votes		5,107	100.00%
Republican hold			

== District 6 ==
District 6 election 1 to be elected
Party	Candidate	Votes	%
Republican	J. C. Powell (incumbent)	4,227	55.10%
Democratic	Stephen C. Bird	3,444	44.90%
Total votes		7,671	100.00%
Republican hold			

== District 7 ==
District 7 election 1 to be elected
Party	Candidate	Votes	%
Democratic	Billy Brown Burke (incumbent)	4,590	55.39%
Republican	Linda Lou Brohard	3,696	44.61%
Total votes		8,286	100.00%
Democratic hold			

== Barbour County ==
Barbour County election 1 to be elected
Party	Candidate	Votes	%
Democratic	Kenneth D. Auvil (incumbent)	3,875	59.42%
Republican	Orville (Chuck) Edens	2,646	40.58%
Total votes		6,521	100.00%
Democratic hold			

== Boone County ==
Boone County election 2 to be elected
Party	Candidate	Votes	%
Democratic	Thomas Goodwin (incumbent)	6,717	40.77%
Democratic	Dennie L. Hill (incumbent)	6,467	39.25%
Republican	Heyward Chambers	3,291	19.98%
Total votes		16,475	100.00%
Democratic hold			

== Braxton County ==
Braxton County election 1 to be elected
Party	Candidate	Votes	%
Democratic	Rodney B. Belknap	3,133	53.05%
Republican	Michael E. Posey	2,773	46.95%
Total votes		5,906	100.00%
Democratic hold			

== Brooke County ==
Brooke County election 2 to be elected
Party	Candidate	Votes	%
Democratic	Irma M. Maple	7,330	31.82%
Democratic	Mino R. D' Aurora (incumbent)	6,325	27.45%
Republican	Paul L. Conaway	5,251	22.79%
Republican	Roger N. Pauls	4,132	17.94%
Total votes		23,038	100.00%
Democratic hold			

== Cabell County ==
Cabell County election 6 to be elected
Party	Candidate	Votes	%
Democratic	Robert R. Nelson (incumbent)	21,703	9.36%
Republican	Dr. John M. Bobbitt (incumbent)	21,188	9.14%
Republican	David B. Daugherty	20,759	8.95%
Republican	C. E. Romine	20,693	8.93%
Republican	Jody G. Smirl (incumbent)	20,564	8.87%
Democratic	Hugh A. Kincaid (incumbent)	19,617	8.46%
Democratic	Freda Paul (incumbent)	19,166	8.27%
Democratic	Mike Casey (incumbent)	18,990	8.19%
Republican	John W. Dickensheets	18,067	7.79%
Republican	Gerald E. Broughton	17,509	7.55%
Democratic	H. Fred Ferguson	16,789	7.24%
Democratic	Don E. Booth	16,787	7.24%
Total votes		231,832	100.00%
Republican gain from Democratic			

== Clay County ==
Clay County election 1 to be elected
Party	Candidate	Votes	%
Republican	John W. Kyle	1,912	52.86%
Democratic	Lane Ellis (incumbent)	1,702	47.06%
Write-in	J. M. Arbogast	3	0.08%
Total votes		3,617	100.00%
Republican gain from Democratic			

== Fayette County ==
Fayette County election 3 to be elected
Party	Candidate	Votes	%
Democratic	Ethel L. Crandall (incumbent)	14,560	24.61%
Democratic	Adam Toney	14,336	24.23%
Democratic	T. E. Myles (incumbent)	14,240	24.07%
Republican	Earl C. Kincaid	5,629	9.52%
Republican	Mark Legg	5,237	8.85%
Republican	Otis D. Morton	5,154	8.71%
Total votes		59,156	100.00%
Democratic hold			

== Hampshire County ==
Hampshire County election 1 to be elected
Party	Candidate	Votes	%
Democratic	James B. Cookman (incumbent)	2,486	100.00%
Total votes		2,486	100.00%
Democratic hold			

== Hancock County ==
Hancock County election 2 to be elected
Party	Candidate	Votes	%
Democratic	Gust G. Brenda Jr.	10,912	33.85%
Democratic	George G. Griffith (incumbent)	10,670	33.10%
Republican	H. Burdette Crow	5,999	18.61%
Republican	John Lincoln Owen	4,651	14.43%
Total votes		32,232	100.00%
Democratic hold			

== Harrison County ==
Harrison County election 4 to be elected
Party	Candidate	Votes	%
Democratic	Donald L. Kopp (incumbent)	17,432	14.19%
Democratic	C. Paul Wanstreet	15,987	13.01%
Democratic	James Laulis	15,973	13.00%
Democratic	Paul G. Lister	15,773	12.84%
Republican	Michael D. Greer	14,696	11.96%
Republican	Boyd L. Warner	14,564	11.85%
Republican	Gary H. Bailey	14,435	11.75%
Republican	Charles G. Johnson	14,006	11.40%
Write-in	John Walker	1	0.00%
Write-in	Duffy Riley	1	0.00%
Write-in	Jack Biafore	1	0.00%
Write-in	SeIby WoIfe	1	0.00%
Write-in	Marshall Bishop	1	0.00%
Write-in	Ralph Keister	1	0.00%
Total votes		122,872	100.00%
Democratic hold			

== Jackson County ==
Jackson County election 1 to be elected
Party	Candidate	Votes	%
Republican	B. Noel Poling (incumbent)	5,142	56.01%
Democratic	Fred Hammack	4,038	43.99%
Total votes		9,180	100.00%
Republican hold			

== Jefferson County ==
Jefferson County election 1 to be elected
Party	Candidate	Votes	%
Democratic	Roger J. Perry	4,074	62.97%
Republican	Louise Leonard	2,396	37.03%
Total votes		6,470	100.00%
Democratic hold			

== Kanawha County ==
Kanawha County election 14 to be elected
Party	Candidate	Votes	%
Democratic	Ivor F. Boiarsky (incumbent)	49,484	4.14%
Democratic	Si Galperin Jr. (incumbent)	47,991	4.02%
Republican	James C. Jeter (incumbent)	45,586	3.82%
Republican	Paul Zakaib Jr. (incumbent)	44,887	3.76%
Democratic	James W. Loop	44,848	3.76%
Republican	Thomas E. Potter (incumbent)	44,659	3.74%
Republican	Cleo S. Jones (incumbent)	44,000	3.69%
Democratic	Sam C. Savilla	43,958	3.68%
Republican	Lon Clark Kinder (incumbent)	43,764	3.67%
Republican	Harlan Wilson Jr.	43,541	3.65%
Republican	Leo G. Kopelman (incumbent)	43,194	3.62%
Republican	Russell L. Davisson (incumbent)	43,172	3.62%
Democratic	Phyllis J. Rutledge	42,947	3.60%
Democratic	J. Dempsey Gibson	42,706	3.58%
Democratic	Kenneth L. Coghill	42,625	3.57%
Democratic	Jesse S. Barker	42,545	3.56%
Republican	Eric Nelson (incumbent)	42,164	3.53%
Democratic	Thomas P. Maroney	41,731	3.50%
Republican	Charles Young	41,502	3.48%
Republican	Alfred A. Lilly (incumbent)	41,161	3.45%
Republican	Chester W. Bourne	41,147	3.45%
Republican	Robert M. Fletcher	40,452	3.39%
Democratic	Richard S. Glaser	40,385	3.38%
Republican	Wilbur L. Carte	40,014	3.35%
Democratic	Charles S. Knowles	39,835	3.34%
Democratic	Harley Wells III	38,862	3.25%
Democratic	Harold T. McCoy	38,453	3.22%
Democratic	Chester Derrick	38,307	3.21%
Total votes		1,193,920	100.00%
Democratic gain from Republican			

== Lewis County ==
Lewis County election 1 to be elected
Party	Candidate	Votes	%
Republican	Fred L. Mulneix (incumbent)	4,136	54.75%
Democratic	Louis G. Craig	3,418	45.25%
Total votes		7,554	100.00%
Republican hold			

== Lincoln County ==
Lincoln County election 1 to be elected
Party	Candidate	Votes	%
Democratic	H. Leon Hager (incumbent)	4,434	54.29%
Republican	Jack Lovejoy	3,734	45.71%
Total votes		8,168	100.00%
Democratic hold			

== Logan County ==
Logan County election 3 to be elected
Party	Candidate	Votes	%
Democratic	Ervin S. Queen (incumbent)	13,843	27.49%
Democratic	Paul E. Hicks (incumbent)	13,599	27.00%
Democratic	Earl Hager (incumbent)	12,770	25.36%
Republican	Garland C. Scaggs	5,260	10.44%
Republican	Melvin Cyfers Jr,	4,891	9.71%
Total votes		50,363	100.00%
Democratic hold			

== Marion County ==
Marion County election 3 to be elected
Party	Candidate	Votes	%
Democratic	William J. Parker	15,796	19.35%
Democratic	J. E. Ned Watson (incumbent)	15,211	18.64%
Democratic	Nick Fantasia (incumbent)	15,073	18.47%
Republican	Tracy Alan Smith	11,911	14.59%
Republican	David L. Swearingin	11,889	14.57%
Republican	F. N. Stern	11,742	14.39%
Total votes		81,622	100.00%
Democratic hold			

== Marshall County ==
Marshall County election 2 to be elected
Party	Candidate	Votes	%
Republican	Roy H. Rogerson (incumbent)	8,366	26.70%
Republican	Robert C. Polen (incumbent)	8,029	25.63%
Democratic	Chester A. Burkey	7,882	25.16%
Democratic	George A. Vance	7,052	22.51%
Total votes		31,329	100.00%
Republican hold			

== Mason County ==
Mason County election 1 to be elected
Party	Candidate	Votes	%
Democratic	Eugene Ball	5,225	52.11%
Republican	R. R. Smith	4,802	47.89%
Total votes		10,027	100.00%
Democratic gain from Republican			

== McDowell County ==
McDowell County election 4 to be elected
Party	Candidate	Votes	%
Democratic	Corbett Church (incumbent)	13,114	19.90%
Democratic	Chester Matney (incumbent)	13,007	19.74%
Democratic	Fred G. Wooten (incumbent)	12,461	18.91%
Democratic	Harry Pauley	11,617	17.63%
Republican	Joe Cassady	4,517	6.86%
Republican	Abishi C. Cunningham	4,283	6.50%
Republican	James L. Gallimore	3,656	5.55%
Republican	L. E. Burks	3,232	4.91%
Total votes		65,887	100.00%
Democratic hold			

== Mercer County ==
Mercer County election 4 to be elected
Party	Candidate	Votes	%
Democratic	Odell H. Huffman	13,749	15.68%
Democratic	Charles E. Lohr (incumbent)	12,962	14.78%
Democratic	Clarence C. Christian Jr. (incumbent)	12,865	14.67%
Democratic	Lucille Thornhill	12,411	14.15%
Republican	Harold D. Brewster Jr.	9,275	10.58%
Republican	Herman E. Kirchner	9,231	10.53%
Republican	James E. Perry	8,703	9.93%
Republican	Edwin C. Damewood	8,485	9.68%
Total votes		87,681	100.00%
Democratic hold			

== Mineral County ==
Mineral County election 1 to be elected
Party	Candidate	Votes	%
Republican	Robert D. Harman (incumbent)	5,109	53.47%
Democratic	William K. Chidester	4,446	46.53%
Total votes		9,555	100.00%
Republican hold			

== Mingo County ==
Mingo County election 2 to be elected
Party	Candidate	Votes	%
Democratic	Robert L. Simpkins (incumbent)	8,235	32.49%
Democratic	T. I. Varney (incumbent)	7,953	31.38%
Republican	Thomas Hanshaw	4,739	18.70%
Republican	Buddy Boyce Preece	4,419	17.43%
Total votes		25,346	100.00%
Democratic hold			

== Monongalia County ==
Monongalia County election 3 to be elected
Party	Candidate	Votes	%
Democratic	Robert W. Dinsmore	13,385	20.30%
Democratic	Harry U. Howell (incumbent)	12,530	19.00%
Democratic	Clifford B. Hoard (incumbent)	11,954	18.13%
Republican	Donald E. Price	10,057	15.25%
Republican	Doretha Barns	9,338	14.16%
Republican	James A. Smith	8,675	13.16%
Total votes		65,939	100.00%
Democratic hold			

== Monroe County ==
Monroe County election 1 to be elected
Party	Candidate	Votes	%
Democratic	W. Marion Shiflet (incumbent)	3,153	54.54%
Republican	John C. Harman	2,628	45.46%
Total votes		5,781	100.00%
Democratic hold			

== Nicholas County ==
Nicholas County election 1 to be elected
Party	Candidate	Votes	%
Democratic	Doc Frazer (incumbent)	5,357	60.98%
Republican	F. H. Mansfield	3,428	39.02%
Total votes		8,785	100.00%
Democratic hold			

== Ohio County ==
Ohio County election 4 to be elected
Party	Candidate	Votes	%
Republican	George H. Seibert Jr. (incumbent)	17,626	15.57%
Republican	Fred P. Stamp Jr. (incumbent)	16,745	14.79%
Republican	Fred A. Grewe Jr. (incumbent)	16,514	14.59%
Republican	James F. Companion	15,636	13.81%
Democratic	Cecil Cece Hedrick	12,773	11.28%
Democratic	H. A. Lewis	12,071	10.66%
Democratic	Mrs. Thais Blatnik	11,566	10.22%
Democratic	John L. Allen	10,283	9.08%
Total votes		113,214	100.00%
Republican hold			

== Preston County ==
Preston County election 1 to be elected
Party	Candidate	Votes	%
Republican	Robert C. Halbritter (incumbent)	6,166	64.01%
Democratic	Marvin (Joe) Wilhelm	3,467	35.99%
Total votes		9,633	100.00%
Republican hold			

== Putnam County ==
Putnam County election 1 to be elected
Party	Candidate	Votes	%
Republican	Charles Robert Henderson	5,536	51.02%
Democratic	William F. Hanson	5,314	48.98%
Total votes		10,850	100.00%
Republican hold			

== Raleigh County ==
Raleigh County election 4 to be elected
Party	Candidate	Votes	%
Democratic	Lewis McManus (incumbent)	18,306	17.21%
Democratic	Anthony J. Sparacino	16,528	15.53%
Democratic	Mrs. W. W. Withrow (incumbent)	16,331	15.35%
Democratic	Ted T. Stacy	16,086	15.12%
Republican	Robert B. Sayre (incumbent)	11,832	11.12%
Republican	Perry Clay Price	9,425	8.86%
Republican	Jerry McGraw	8,962	8.42%
Republican	Cyril Cy Lilly	8,929	8.39%
Total votes		106,399	100.00%
Democratic gain from Republican			

== Randolph County ==
Randolph County election 1 to be elected
Party	Candidate	Votes	%
Democratic	Earl H. Stalnaker (incumbent)	7,441	100.00%
Total votes		7,441	100.00%
Democratic hold			

== Roane County ==
Roane County election 1 to be elected
Party	Candidate	Votes	%
Republican	Orton A. Jones	4,247	65.03%
Democratic	Daniel J. Looney	2,284	34.97%
Total votes		6,531	100.00%
Republican hold			

== Summers County ==
Summers County election 1 to be elected
Party	Candidate	Votes	%
Democratic	Jack E. Holt	4,093	65.36%
Republican	James V. Coste	2,169	34.64%
Total votes		6,262	100.00%
Democratic hold			

== Taylor County ==
Taylor County election 1 to be elected
Party	Candidate	Votes	%
Republican	C. N. Bud Harman	3,293	53.48%
Democratic	Samuel A. Morasco (incumbent)	2,864	46.52%
Total votes		6,157	100.00%
Republican gain from Democratic			

== Upshur County ==
Upshur County election 1 to be elected
Party	Candidate	Votes	%
Republican	Charles R. Shaffer	4,205	59.65%
Democratic	Berlin Karlen	2,845	40.35%
Total votes		7,050	100.00%
Republican hold			

== Wayne County ==
Wayne County election 2 to be elected
Party	Candidate	Votes	%
Democratic	Robert K. Flanagan (incumbent)	8,929	30.17%
Democratic	Clayton C. Davidson (incumbent)	8,474	28.64%
Republican	Hobart Akers	6,369	21.52%
Republican	David F. Varney	5,820	19.67%
Total votes		29,592	100.00%
Democratic hold			

== Webster County ==
Webster County election 1 to be elected
Party	Candidate	Votes	%
Democratic	Albert L. Sommerville Jr. (incumbent)	2,753	100.00%
Total votes		2,753	100.00%
Democratic hold			

== Wetzel County ==
Wetzel County election 1 to be elected
Party	Candidate	Votes	%
Republican	William A. Powell Jr.	4,275	50.29%
Democratic	Joseph M. Ballouz	4,225	49.71%
Total votes		8,500	100.00%
Republican gain from Democratic			

== Wood County ==
Wood County election 4 to be elected
Party	Candidate	Votes	%
Republican	Robert W. Burk Jr. (incumbent)	21,295	15.66%
Republican	William P. A. Nicely (incumbent)	20,453	15.04%
Republican	J. C. Butcher (incumbent)	19,794	14.56%
Republican	Spencer K. Creel (incumbent)	19,721	14.50%
Democratic	Russell G. Beall	14,700	10.81%
Democratic	John M. Yeager	13,517	9.94%
Democratic	John T. Smith	13,325	9.80%
Democratic	Joseph M. Cameron	13,173	9.69%
Total votes		135,978	100.00%
Republican hold			

== Wyoming County ==
Wyoming County election 2 to be elected
Party	Candidate	Votes	%
Democratic	Warren R. McGraw	6,526	30.93%
Democratic	J. T. Davidson Jr.	6,388	30.28%
Republican	Clair L. Cook	4,150	19.67%
Republican	Jimmy R. Lester	4,032	19.11%
Total votes		21,096	100.00%
Democratic hold			

== See also ==
- 1968 United States presidential election in West Virginia
- 1968 United States House of Representatives elections in West Virginia
- 1968 West Virginia gubernatorial election
