= 1966 West Virginia House of Delegates election =

- November 8, 1966

All 100 seats in the West Virginia House of Delegates 51 seats needed for a majority
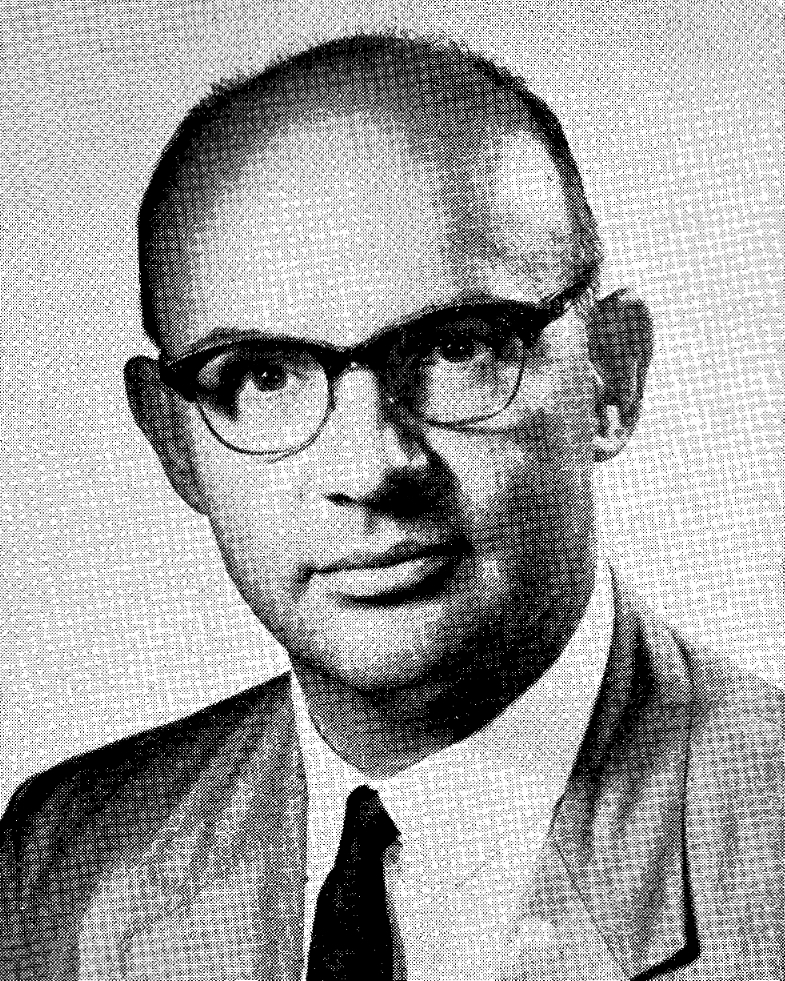

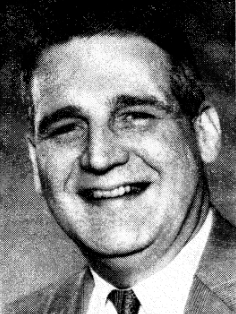
	Majority party	Minority party
Leader	H. Laban White	George H. Seibert (retired as leader)
Party	Democratic	Republican
Leader since	1965	1957
Leader's seat	Harrison Co.	Ohio Co.
Last election	91 seats	9 seats
Seats won	65	35
Seat change	▼26	▲26
Popular vote	963,112	841,008
Percentage	53.38%	46.62%
- Democratic hold Republican gain Republican hold Multi-member districts: Even split Democratic: 40–50% 50–60% 60–70% 70–80% 80–90% 90–100% Republican: 40–50% 50–60% 60–70% 70–80% 90–100%
Speaker before election
H. Laban White
Democratic
Elected Speaker
H. Laban White
Democratic

Elections to the West Virginia House of Delegates were held on November 8, 1966, to elect 100 candidates to the House to serve a two-year term. The Republican Party made large gains in the chamber, picking up every seat in Wood and Ohio counties, and gaining ten of fourteen seats in Kanawha County. The Democrats fell short of a two-thirds majority, losing 26 seats, but the heavily-populated southern region and the area around Clarksburg and Morgantown remained solidly Democratic.

Future Governor of West Virginia Jay Rockefeller was elected to his only term in the House, receiving the most votes out of the twenty-eight candidates in Kanawha County. On November 11, 1967, House Republicans elected Brereton C. Jones of Mason County floor leader. Jones would later serve as the Democratic Governor of Kentucky.

This election used the map first drawn for the 1964 general election, using plurality block voting in districts with multiple delegates.

== District 1 ==
District 1 election 2 to be elected
Party	Candidate	Votes	%
Democratic	Robert M. Steptoe (incumbent)	6,145	28.27%
Republican	Wallace L. Files	5,886	27.07%
Democratic	Ralph B. Hovermale (incumbent)	5,119	23.55%
Republican	A. Foster Lineweaver	4,590	21.11%
Total votes		21,740	100.00%
Republican gain from Democratic			

== District 2 ==
District 2 election 1 to be elected
Party	Candidate	Votes	%
Republican	Larkin B. Ours (United States)	3,274	100.00%
Total votes		3,274	100.00%
Republican hold			

== District 3 ==
District 3 election 1 to be elected
Party	Candidate	Votes	%
Democratic	Thomas J. Hawse	2,918	100.00%
Total votes		2,918	100.00%
Democratic hold			

== District 4 ==
District 4 election 2 to be elected
Party	Candidate	Votes	%
Democratic	Thomas C. Edgar (incumbent)	7,134	50.47%
Democratic	Richard Bowman	7,001	49.53%
Total votes		14,135	100.00%
Democratic hold			

== District 5 ==
District 5 election 1 to be elected
Party	Candidate	Votes	%
Republican	Forrest M. Buck (incumbent)	3,598	100.00%
Total votes		3,598	100.00%
Republican hold			

== District 6 ==
District 6 election 1 to be elected
Party	Candidate	Votes	%
Republican	J. C. Powell	2,917	52.27%
Democratic	F. Wayne Lanham (incumbent)	2,664	47.73%
Total votes		5,581	100.00%
Republican gain from Democratic			

== District 7 ==
District 7 election 1 to be elected
Party	Candidate	Votes	%
Democratic	Billy B. Burke (incumbent)	3,692	53.95%
Republican	James Roydice Jones	3,151	46.05%
Total votes		6,843	100.00%
Democratic hold			

== Barbour Co. ==
Barbour County election 1 to be elected
Party	Candidate	Votes	%
Democratic	Kenneth D. Auvil (incumbent)	3,016	60.27%
Republican	Orville E. Edens	1,988	39.73%
Total votes		5,004	100.00%
Democratic hold			

== Boone Co. ==
Boone County election 2 to be elected
Party	Candidate	Votes	%
Democratic	Thomas Goodwin (incumbent)	4,543	40.87%
Democratic	Dennie L. Hill (incumbent)	4,543	40.87%
Republican	Wetzel C. Adkins	2,031	18.27%
Total votes		11,117	100.00%
Democratic hold			

== Braxton Co. ==
Braxton County election 1 to be elected
Party	Candidate	Votes	%
Democratic	Paul S. Moyers (incumbent)	2,667	55.79%
Republican	George M. Cooper	2,113	44.21%
Total votes		4,780	100.00%
Democratic hold			

== Brooke Co. ==
Brooke County election 2 to be elected
Party	Candidate	Votes	%
Democratic	Mino R. D'Aurora (incumbent)	4,448	50.90%
Democratic	Martin Ragan (incumbent)	4,291	49.10%
Total votes		8,739	100.00%
Democratic hold			

== Cabell Co. ==
Cabell County election 6 to be elected
Party	Candidate	Votes	%
Republican	Jack Bobbitt	15,396	10.07%
Democratic	Robert R. Nelson (incumbent)	13,902	9.09%
Republican	Jody G. Smirl	13,715	8.97%
Democratic	Freda N. Paul (incumbent)	13,435	8.79%
Democratic	Mike Casey (incumbent)	12,737	8.33%
Democratic	Hugh A. Kincaid (incumbent)	12,488	8.17%
Republican	Gerald E. Broughton	12,348	8.08%
Democratic	J. Bernard Poindexter (incumbent)	12,212	7.99%
Republican	Harry F. Thompson	11,935	7.81%
Democratic	Donald E. Smith (incumbent)	11,814	7.73%
Republican	Carl N. Woodrum	11,643	7.62%
Republican	John W. Dickensheets	11,261	7.37%
Total votes		152,886	100.00%
Republican gain from Democratic			

== Clay Co. ==
Clay County election 1 to be elected
Party	Candidate	Votes	%
Democratic	Lane Ellis	1,506	50.05%
Republican	Elmer L. Pritt	1,503	49.95%
Total votes		3,009	100.00%
Democratic hold			

== Fayette Co. ==
Fayette County election 3 to be elected
Party	Candidate	Votes	%
Democratic	Robert K. Holliday (incumbent)	8,586	23.37%
Democratic	Ethel Crandall	8,256	22.47%
Democratic	T. E. Myles (incumbent)	8,061	21.94%
Republican	C. R. Hill Jr.	4,330	11.79%
Republican	H. Don Kincaid	3,965	10.79%
Republican	Harvey Layne Jr.	3,537	9.63%
Total votes		36,735	100.00%
Democratic hold			

== Hampshire Co. ==
Hampshire County election 1 to be elected
Party	Candidate	Votes	%
Democratic	James B. Cookman	1,751	100.00%
Total votes		1,751	100.00%
Democratic hold			

== Hancock Co. ==
Hancock County election 2 to be elected
Party	Candidate	Votes	%
Democratic	Callie Tsapis	6,331	32.02%
Democratic	George G. Griffith (incumbent)	5,734	29.00%
Republican	John D. Herron	3,948	19.96%
Republican	Ernest John	3,762	19.02%
Total votes		19,775	100.00%
Democratic hold			

== Harrison Co. ==
Harrison County election 4 to be elected
Party	Candidate	Votes	%
Democratic	H. Laban White (incumbent)	12,681	15.06%
Democratic	C. P. Marstiller (incumbent)	11,679	13.87%
Democratic	Carmine J. Cann (incumbent)	11,465	13.61%
Democratic	Donald L. Kopp (incumbent)	11,123	13.21%
Republican	Charles V. Selby Jr.	9,828	11.67%
Republican	Albert B. Morrison	9,450	11.22%
Republican	Leon Farmer Wilson	9,017	10.71%
Republican	George E. Hofford	8,987	10.67%
Total votes		84,230	100.00%
Democratic hold			

== Jackson Co. ==
Jackson County election 1 to be elected
Party	Candidate	Votes	%
Republican	B. Noel Poling (incumbent)	3,801	59.30%
Democratic	Harry E.Cooke	2,609	40.70%
Total votes		6,410	100.00%
Republican hold			

== Jefferson Co. ==
Jefferson County election 1 to be elected
Party	Candidate	Votes	%
Democratic	Thornton W. Wilt (incumbent)	2,261	100.00%
Total votes		2,261	100.00%
Democratic hold			

== Kanawha Co. ==
Kanawha County election 14 to be elected
Party	Candidate	Votes	%
Democratic	John D. Rockefeller IV	36,789	4.63%
Republican	Cleo S. Jones	32,901	4.14%
Republican	Walter W. Carey	31,924	4.02%
Democratic	George K. W. Woo (incumbent)	31,492	3.96%
Democratic	Ivor F. Boiarsky (incumbent)	30,802	3.88%
Republican	Lon Clark Kinder Sr.	29,992	3.77%
Republican	Paul Zakaib	29,947	3.77%
Republican	James Clay Jeter	29,721	3.74%
Democratic	Si Galperin Jr.	29,429	3.70%
Republican	Leo G. Kopelman	29,266	3.68%
Republican	Alfred A. Lilly	28,746	3.62%
Republican	Thomas E. Potter	28,704	3.61%
Republican	Eric Nelson	28,333	3.57%
Republican	Russell L. Davisson	28,331	3.57%
Democratic	Thomas A. Knight (incumbent)	28,319	3.56%
Republican	Charles Young	28,043	3.53%
Republican	James W. Thornhill	27,765	3.49%
Republican	William Ricks	27,480	3.46%
Republican	Blanceh Horan	27,458	3.46%
Democratic	Jack L. Pauley (incumbent)	26,434	3.33%
Democratic	J. F. Bedell Jr. (incumbent)	26,222	3.30%
Democratic	Kelly L. Castleberry (incumbent)	26,125	3.29%
Democratic	Jesse S. Barker (incumbent)	26,030	3.28%
Democratic	Dempsey Gibson	25,888	3.26%
Democratic	Fred L. Scott (incumbent)	25,616	3.22%
Democratic	James K. Thomas Jr.	24,967	3.14%
Democratic	Pat Board Jr. (incumbent)	24,559	3.09%
Democratic	L. E. Thompson	23,224	2.92%
Total votes		794,507	100.00%
Republican gain from Democratic			

== Lewis Co. ==
Lewis County election 1 to be elected
Party	Candidate	Votes	%
Republican	Fred L. Mulneix	3,208	56.48%
Democratic	Louis Go Craig (incumbent)	2,472	43.52%
Total votes		5,680	100.00%
Republican gain from Democratic			

== Lincoln Co. ==
Lincoln County election 1 to be elected
Party	Candidate	Votes	%
Democratic	H. Leon Hager (incumbent)	3,826	59.62%
Republican	Marion L. Priestly	2,591	40.38%
Total votes		6,417	100.00%
Democratic hold			

== Logan Co. ==
Logan County election 3 to be elected
Party	Candidate	Votes	%
Democratic	Ervin S. Queen	11,645	26.22%
Democratic	Earl Hager (incumbent)	10,825	24.38%
Democratic	W. N. Anderson Jr. (incumbent)	10,799	24.32%
Republican	William Harvey Napier	5,733	12.91%
Republican	R. C. Sheets	5,408	12.18%
Total votes		44,410	100.00%
Democratic hold			

== Marion Co. ==
Marion County election 3 to be elected
Party	Candidate	Votes	%
Democratic	W. R. Wilson	10,594	19.59%
Democratic	J. E. Watson (incumbent)	9,627	17.80%
Democratic	Nick Fantasia (incumbent)	8,944	16.54%
Republican	Isaac Herbert Hawkins	8,529	15.77%
Republican	Paul J. Lamb	8,351	15.44%
Republican	James William Durham	8,034	14.86%
Total votes		54,079	100.00%
Democratic hold			

== Marshall Co. ==
Marshall County election 2 to be elected
Party	Candidate	Votes	%
Republican	Roy H. Rogerson	6,290	27.73%
Republican	Robert C. Polen	5,876	25.90%
Democratic	John T. Madden (incumbent)	5,541	24.42%
Democratic	Chester A. Burkey	4,979	21.95%
Total votes		22,686	100.00%
Republican gain from Democratic			

== Mason Co. ==
Mason County election 1 to be elected
Party	Candidate	Votes	%
Republican	Brereton C. Jones (incumbent)	4,702	60.13%
Democratic	Lawrence Plants	3,118	39.87%
Total votes		7,820	100.00%
Republican hold			

== McDowell Co. ==
McDowell County election 4 to be elected
Party	Candidate	Votes	%
Democratic	Chester M. Matney	7,999	25.62%
Democratic	Corbett Church (incumbent)	7,901	25.31%
Democratic	Fred G. Wooten (incumbent)	7,853	25.15%
Democratic	Wilfred L. Dickerson	7,466	23.91%
Total votes		31,219	100.00%
Democratic hold			

== Mercer Co. ==
Mercer County election 4 to be elected
Party	Candidate	Votes	%
Democratic	Charles E. Lohr (incumbent)	10,305	18.81%
Democratic	James C. Cain (incumbent)	10,161	18.54%
Democratic	Clarence C. Christian Jr. (incumbent)	9,241	16.86%
Democratic	Fred Thomason	9,191	16.77%
Republican	Fred O. Blue	8,592	15.68%
Republican	James E. Perry	7,305	13.33%
Total votes		54,795	100.00%
Democratic hold			

== Mineral Co. ==
Mineral County election 1 to be elected
Party	Candidate	Votes	%
Republican	Robert D. Harman (incumbent)	3,807	62.59%
Democratic	John B. Powell	2,275	37.41%
Total votes		6,082	100.00%
Republican hold			

== Mingo Co. ==
Mingo County election 2 to be elected
Party	Candidate	Votes	%
Democratic	T. I. Varney (incumbent)	7,146	36.94%
Democratic	Robert L. Simpkins (incumbent)	6,989	36.13%
Republican	HI Maynard	2,707	13.99%
Republican	W. H. Osborne	2,502	12.93%
Total votes		19,344	100.00%
Democratic hold			

== Monongalia Co. ==
Monongalia County election 3 to be elected
Party	Candidate	Votes	%
Democratic	Charles S. Armistead (incumbent)	8,314	19.99%
Democratic	Harry U. Howell (incumbent)	7,118	17.11%
Democratic	Clifford B. Hoard	6,941	16.69%
Republican	Jim Kent Jr.	6,620	15.91%
Republican	Joseph A. Laurita Jr.	6,343	15.25%
Republican	William D. Barnes	6,264	15.06%
Total votes		41,600	100.00%
Democratic hold			

== Monroe Co. ==
Monroe County election 1 to be elected
Party	Candidate	Votes	%
Democratic	William Marion Shiflet (incumbent)	2,561	100.00%
Total votes		2,561	100.00%
Democratic hold			

== Nicholas Co. ==
Nicholas County election 1 to be elected
Party	Candidate	Votes	%
Democratic	Doc Frazer (incumbent)	3,295	100.00%
Total votes		3,295	100.00%
Democratic hold			

== Ohio Co. ==
Ohio County election 4 to be elected
Party	Candidate	Votes	%
Republican	George H. Seibert (incumbent)	14,149	16.41%
Republican	Fred P. Stamp Jr.	12,400	14.38%
Republican	George F. Beneke	12,020	13.94%
Republican	Fred A. Grewe Jr.	11,356	13.17%
Democratic	Jack R. Adams (incumbent)	10,278	11.92%
Democratic	James L. Weaver	9,438	10.95%
Democratic	Joseph H. Duffy	8,470	9.82%
Democratic	James D. McDermott	8,109	9.41%
Total votes		86,220	100.00%
Republican gain from Democratic			

== Preston Co. ==
Preston County election 1 to be elected
Party	Candidate	Votes	%
Republican	Robert C. Halbritter	4,554	68.80%
Democratic	Betty Stewart	2,065	31.20%
Total votes		6,619	100.00%
Republican gain from Democratic			

== Putnam Co. ==
Putnam County election 1 to be elected
Party	Candidate	Votes	%
Republican	Kenneth C. Ranson	3,843	53.92%
Democratic	J. Dick Gibson (incumbent)	3,284	46.08%
Total votes		7,127	100.00%
Republican gain from Democratic			

== Raleigh Co. ==
Raleigh County election 4 to be elected
Party	Candidate	Votes	%
Democratic	Lewis N. McManus (incumbent)	10,224	14.45%
Democratic	E. M. Payne III (incumbent)	9,841	13.91%
Republican	Robert B. Sayre	9,054	12.80%
Democratic	Mrs. W. W. Withrow (incumbent)	9,041	12.78%
Republican	R. J. Lucas, Jr.	8,936	12.63%
Democratic	Ben F. Williams Jr.	8,829	12.48%
Republican	Robert Thomson Jr.	8,113	11.47%
Republican	Ira D. Kessinger	6,700	9.47%
Total votes		70,738	100.00%
Republican gain from Democratic			

== Randolph Co. ==
Randolph County election 1 to be elected
Party	Candidate	Votes	%
Democratic	Earl H. Stalnaker (incumbent)	4,817	66.46%
Republican	Gwendolyn D. Cupp	2,431	33.54%
Total votes		7,248	100.00%
Democratic hold			

== Roane Co. ==
Roane County election 1 to be elected
Party	Candidate	Votes	%
Republican	Gene M. Ashley (incumbent)	2,793	59.74%
Democratic	O. L. Starcher	1,882	40.26%
Total votes		4,675	100.00%
Republican hold			

== Summers Co. ==
Summers County election 1 to be elected
Party	Candidate	Votes	%
Democratic	Davis W. Ritter	2,729	100.00%
Total votes		2,729	100.00%
Democratic hold			

== Taylor Co. ==
Taylor County election 1 to be elected
Party	Candidate	Votes	%
Democratic	Samuel A. Morasco (incumbent)	2,187	50.09%
Republican	Robert T. Conner	2,179	49.91%
Total votes		4,366	100.00%
Democratic hold			

== Upshur Co. ==
Upshur County election 1 to be elected
Party	Candidate	Votes	%
Republican	Kenneth E. Queen (incumbent)	3,152	70.29%
Democratic	Morris L. Hayhurst	1,332	29.71%
Total votes		4,484	100.00%
Republican hold			

== Wayne Co. ==
Wayne County election 2 to be elected
Party	Candidate	Votes	%
Democratic	Clayton C. Davidson (incumbent)	6,345	32.73%
Democratic	Robert K. Flanagan	6,338	32.69%
Republican	David F. Varney	3,524	18.18%
Republican	Virginia Murrey Owens	3,179	16.40%
Total votes		19,386	100.00%
Democratic hold			

== Webster Co. ==
Webster County election 1 to be elected
Party	Candidate	Votes	%
Democratic	A. L. Sommerville Jr.	1,984	100.00%
Total votes		1,984	100.00%
Democratic hold			

== Wetzel Co. ==
Wetzel County election 1 to be elected
Party	Candidate	Votes	%
Democratic	Evelyn Schupbach (incumbent)	3,175	51.75%
Republican	Paul L. Johnson	2,960	48.25%
Total votes		6,135	100.00%
Democratic hold			

== Wood Co. ==
Wood County election 4 to be elected
Party	Candidate	Votes	%
Republican	Robert W. Burk Jr.	13,772	16.44%
Republican	William P. A. Nicely	12,801	15.28%
Republican	Jim C. Butcher	11,926	14.23%
Republican	Spencer K. Creel	11,719	13.99%
Democratic	Eugene A. Knotts (incumbent)	9,482	11.32%
Democratic	J. Douglas Ayers (incumbent)	8,629	10.30%
Democratic	Charles A. Townsend	8,294	9.90%
Democratic	George Barnett	7,167	8.55%
Total votes		83,790	100.00%
Republican gain from			

== Wyoming Co. ==
Wood County election 2 to be elected
Party	Candidate	Votes	%
Democratic	J. Paul England (incumbent)	4,715	50.49%
Democratic	C. E. Allen (incumbent)	4,623	49.51%
Total votes		9,338	100.00%
Democratic hold			

== See also ==
- 1966 United States Senate election in West Virginia
- 1966 United States House of Representatives elections in West Virginia
