= Solomon S. Fleming =

American politician and merchant (1812–1901)

Speaker of the West Virginia House of Delegates
- In office 1869–1870
- Preceded by: Henry C. McWhorter
- Succeeded by: William M. Welch

Member of the West Virginia House of Delegates from the Harrison County district
- In office 1863–1869 Serving with Nathan Goff Sr., Nathan Goff Jr., and Sidney Haymond

1st Mayor of Shinnston
- In office 1852–1877
- Preceded by: Seat established
- Succeeded by: Levi C. Shinn

Personal details
- Born: Solomon Stevenson Fleming; October 19, 1812 Middletown, near Fairmont, Virginia, United States
- Died: March 2, 1901 (aged 88) Shinnston, West Virginia, United States
- Party: Whig Party; Republican Party
- Spouse: Elizabeth Ebert (m. 1835; died 1899)
- Children: 8

Solomon Stevenson Fleming (October 19, 1812 – March 2, 1901) was an American politician, merchant, and farmer. He served as the first mayor of Shinnston, and he served in the West Virginia House of Delegates and as Speaker of the House during his last years as a member.

== Early life ==
Stevenson was born on October 19, 1812, in Middletown, a town near Fairmont, West Virginia, to William and Ann Fleming. William, his father, was commissioned as a captain in the War of 1812, although the war ended before he saw action. Solomon was raised on his father's farm and was educated in a log house during winter.

By the 1840s, he moved to Shinnston, where he lived the rest of his life, spending thirty years as a merchant and farmer in the city.

== Career ==
During his life in Shinnston, Fleming owned one of the first general stores and mills in the area, conducting the store from 1841 to 1872. In 1852, when Shinnston became incorporated, the town was authorized to elect a mayor, council, and several trustees. Fleming was then elected the first mayor of Shinnston, serving in that role until 1877, when he was succeeded by Levi C. Shinn.

Prior to the American Civil War starting, Fleming was a prominent advocate for the Southern Unionist cause, participating as a delegate in the Clarksburg and Wheeling Convention in 1861, rising up in the ranks of the Republican Party. By 1863, he was first elected to the state legislature in the West Virginia House of Delegates from Harrison County for about six years. In 1862, he was invigorated to reorganize and muster up the 138th Regiment Militia into a defensive position for the Civil War. He later volunteered as an adjutant of the militia, going to Brown's Island to prevent Confederate General John Hunt Morgan from crossing the West Virginia border.

In April 1863, Shinnston was affected by the Jones–Imboden Raid, where Confederate soldiers raided Fleming's store and then again in November, with them dressed in Union army clothing. He was robbed again in 1865. Several cases were brought to the Supreme Court to recover damages for property. One such case was when Fleming sued an Asbury P. Sturm, a Confederate soldier, and Charles E. McIntire "for the taking and carrying away [...] of certain goods, wares and merchandise" with an attachment levied on their land, on the theory that they were non-natives of the state.

When Sturm and McIntire made no defense, Fleming recovered a judgment against them in the amount of $877.72 in December 1864.

He later served as the Chairman of the Committee of Finance and Taxation from 1866 to 1867. By 1869, fellow members of the Republican Party appointed him to serve as the Speaker of the House of Delegates until 1870.

Fleming later died in March 2, 1901, in his residence in Shinnston from paralysis and old age.

== Personal life ==
Politically, Fleming was a member of the Whig Party before becoming a member of the Republican Party later on in his life. He was raised as a Presbyterian, but was not a member of any church until his later years, after marrying his wife in Fairmont.

On July 2, 1835, Fleming married Elizabeth Ebert in Fairmont, where they had eight children together. Ebert died on December 6, 1899.
