= Henry C. McWhorter =

American judge (1836–1913)

Justice of the Supreme Court of Appeals of West Virginia
- In office January 1, 1897 – December 31, 1909
- Preceded by: Homer Holt
- Succeeded by: L. Judson Williams

Member of the West Virginia House of Delegates
- In office 1885–1887

Speaker of the West Virginia House of Delegates
- In office 1868–1869
- Governor: Arthur Boreman
- Preceded by: David Pinnell
- Succeeded by: Solomon Fleming

Personal details
- Born: Henry Clay McWhorter; February 20, 1836 Ashley, Ohio, U.S.
- Died: April 15, 1913 (aged 77) Charleston, West Virginia, U.S.
- Party: Republican

Henry Clay McWhorter (February 20, 1836 – April 15, 1913) was a lawyer, judge, and politician in West Virginia.

McWhorter served in the Union Army, reaching the rank of captain. He resigned from active service in 1863 due to a wound and spent the remainder of the war as a clerk in the provost marshal's office. After the war he was admitted to the bar (1866) and spent four terms in the West Virginia House of Delegates, serving as Speaker 1868-9. He was again a Delegate from 1885 to 1887. McWhorter attended the 1868 Republican Party convention as an at-large delegate from West Virginia. He was an unsuccessful Republican candidate for the Supreme Court of Appeals of West Virginia in 1888, but in 1896 he was elected to the court for a twelve-year term.

McWhorter served on the board of trustees of West Virginia Wesleyan College from the institution's founding in 1890 to his death in 1913; he served as president of the board from 1897 until 1913.

McWhorter was married four times. He married Mary Hardman in 1857; she died in 1878. He married Eliza F. McWhorter in 1879; she died in 1881. He married Lucy M. Clark in 1885; she died in 1900. He married Caroline M. Gates in 1904.

Henry C. McWhorter's brother Joseph M. McWhorter (1828–1913) was also a notable West Virginia lawyer, politician, and judge.
