= Joseph Marcellus McWhorter =

American politician

Joseph Marcellus McWhorter (April 30, 1828 – August 18, 1913) was a West Virginia lawyer, politician, educator, and judge.

== Biography ==
Born near Jane Lew, Virginia, the eldest son in a farming family, McWhorter supplemented his public school education with extensive reading, becoming at times a school teacher himself. In 1856 he was appointed county clerk of newly organized Roane County and was later elected to that post twice. He was elected to the first West Virginian legislature. After serving as superintendent of the state penitentiary, he was elected State Auditor in 1864 and 1866. He was elected secretary of the newly organized West Virginia Insurance Company in 1869, but resigned when he was appointed judge of the Seventh judicial circuit in 1870. McWhorter moved to Lewisburg and made that his residence for the rest of his life. After his term as judge expired at the end of 1872, he was appointed superintendent of schools for Greenbrier County. He was elected mayor of Lewisburg in 1887. In 1892 he ran unsuccessfully for judge of the West Virginia Supreme Court of Appeals. He was elected to an eight-year term on the circuit court in 1896, the same year his brother Henry C. McWhorter was elected to the Supreme Court of Appeals.

McWhorter was married twice. His first wife was Julia Stalnaker (died August 26, 1869) and they had ten children. He married Julia Kinsley (1837-June 1913) in 1870 and they had four children. His son Louis E. McWhorter also became a lawyer and served in the West Virginia House of Delegates in 1905, representing Kanawha County.

He died in Lewisburg on August 18, 1913.
