= List of speakers of the West Virginia House of Delegates =

Speaker of the West Virginia House of Delegates
- Seal of West Virginia
- Incumbent; Roger Hanshaw since August 29, 2018
- West Virginia House of Delegates
- Status: Presiding officer
- Seat: West Virginia State Capitol, Charleston
- Appointer: House of Delegates
- Constituting instrument: West Virginia Constitution
- Formation: June 20, 1863; 163 years ago
- First holder: Spicer Patrick
- Succession: Second
- Website: www.wvlegislature.gov/House/speaker.cfm

The speaker of the West Virginia House of Delegates is the presiding officer of the House of Delegates in West Virginia. Since West Virginia's founding in 1863, the following persons have served as speaker:

== Speakers of the House of Delegates under the Constitution of West Virginia ==
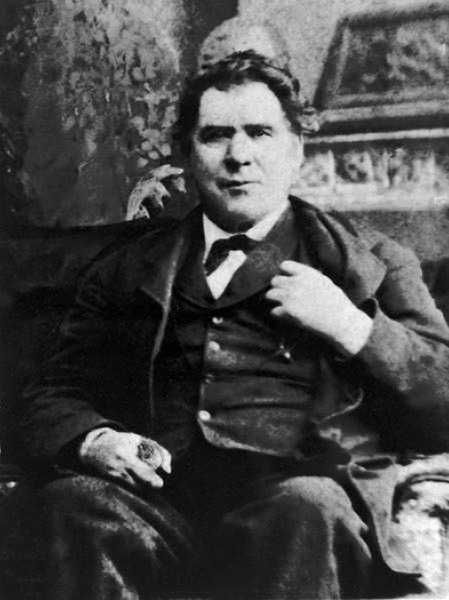
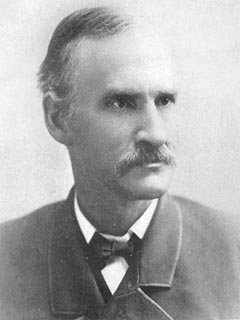
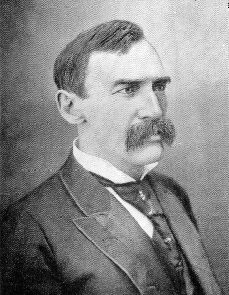
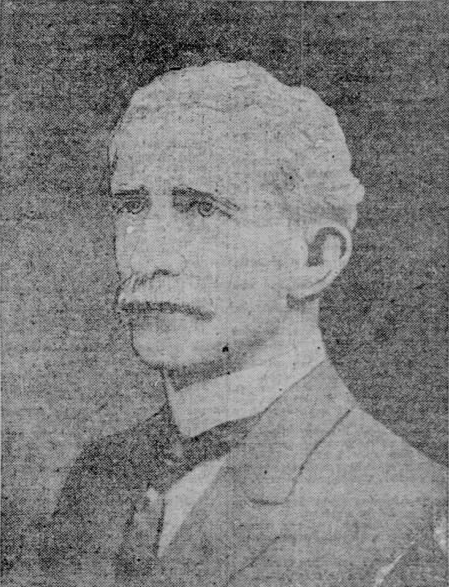
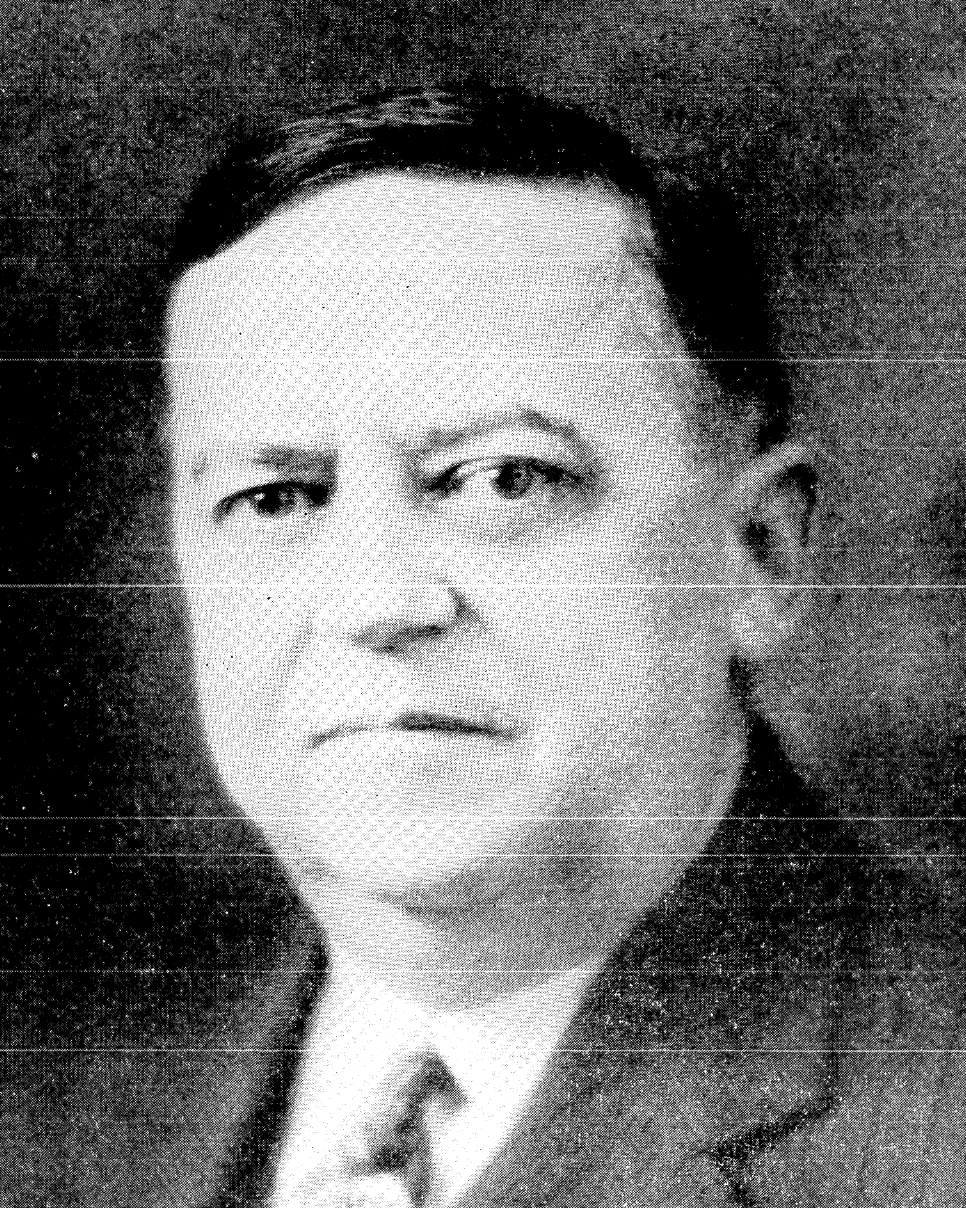
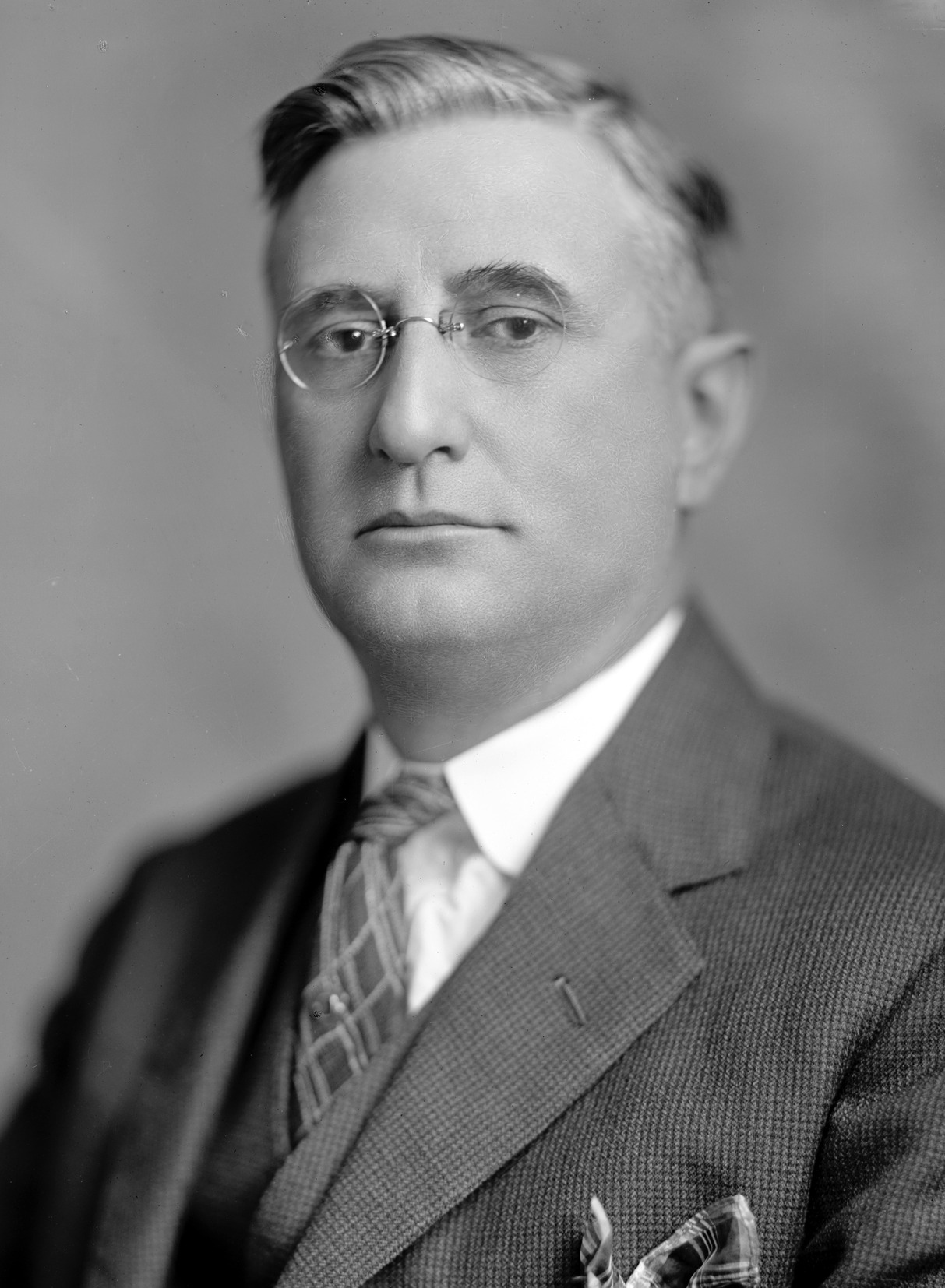
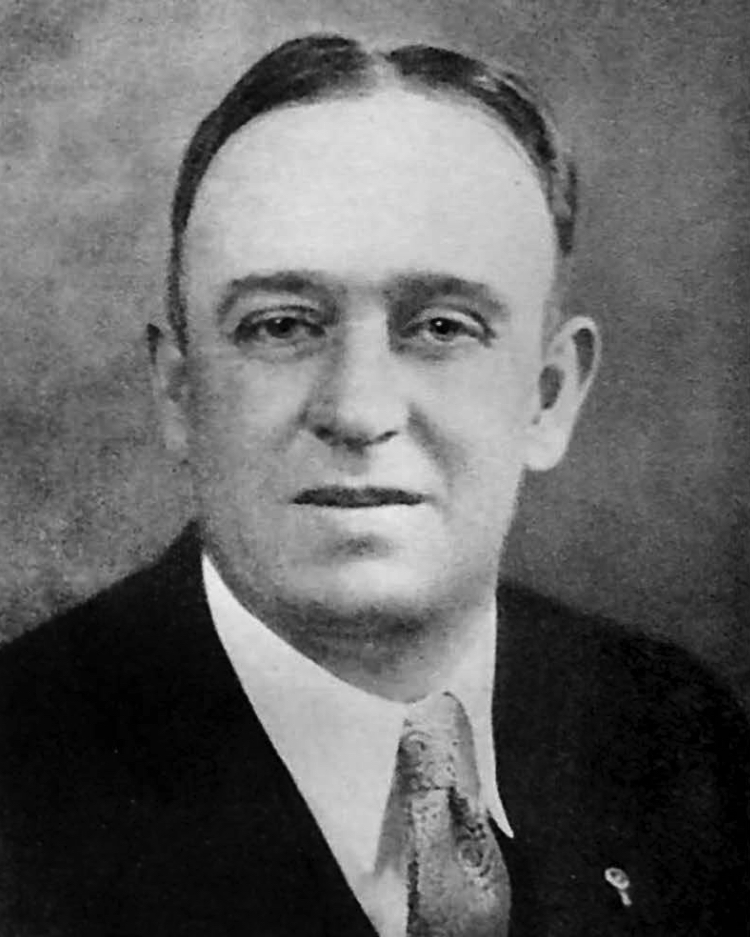
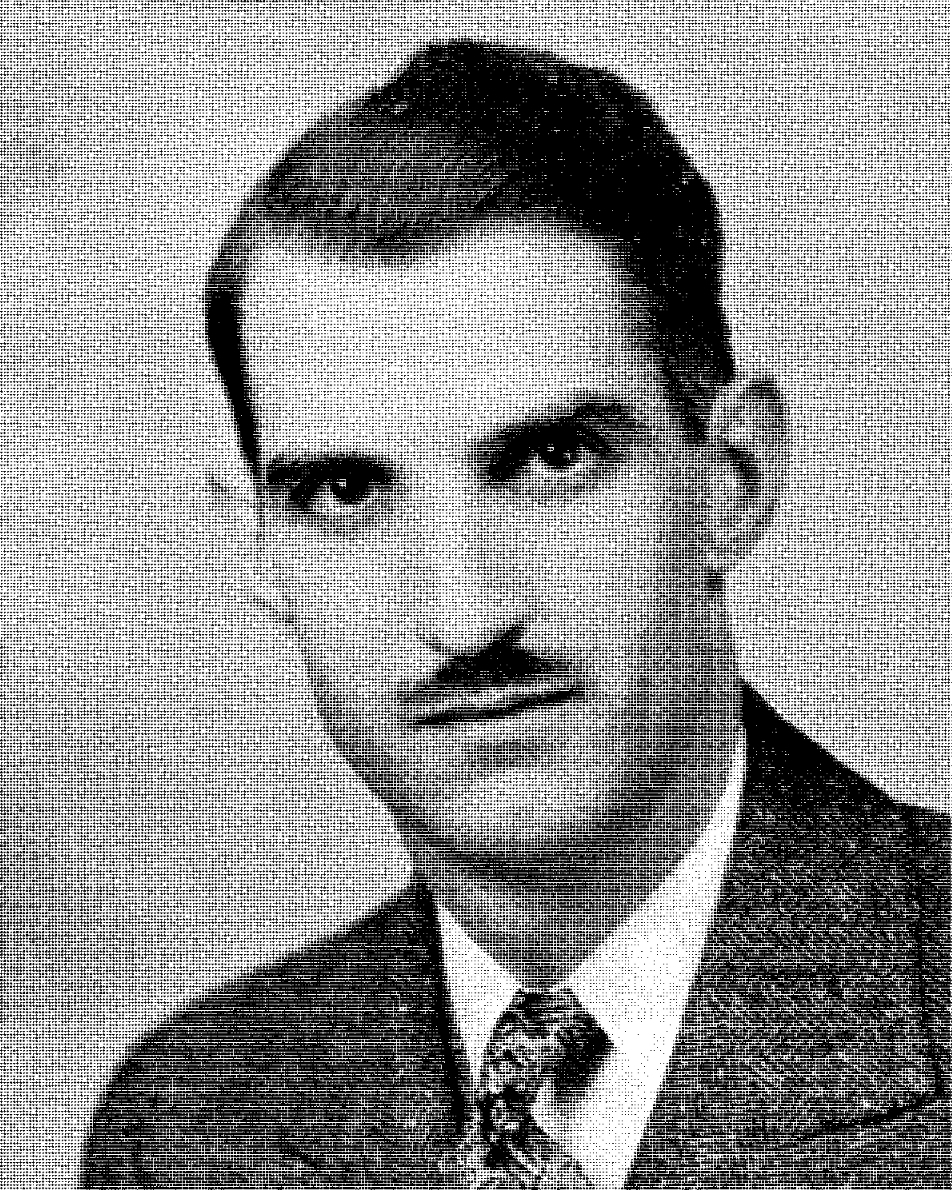
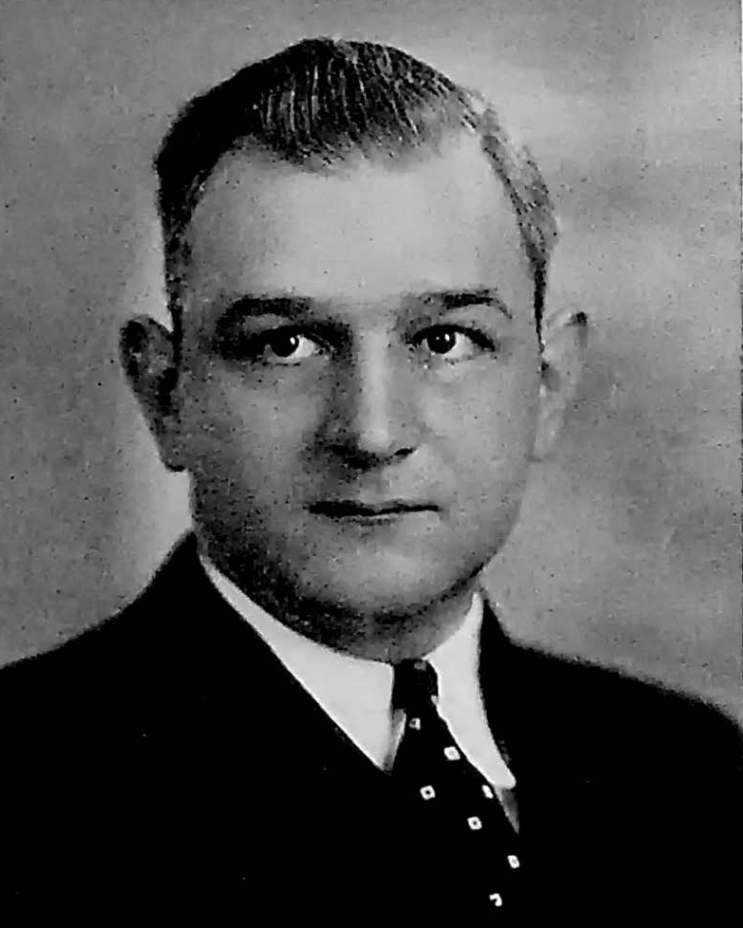
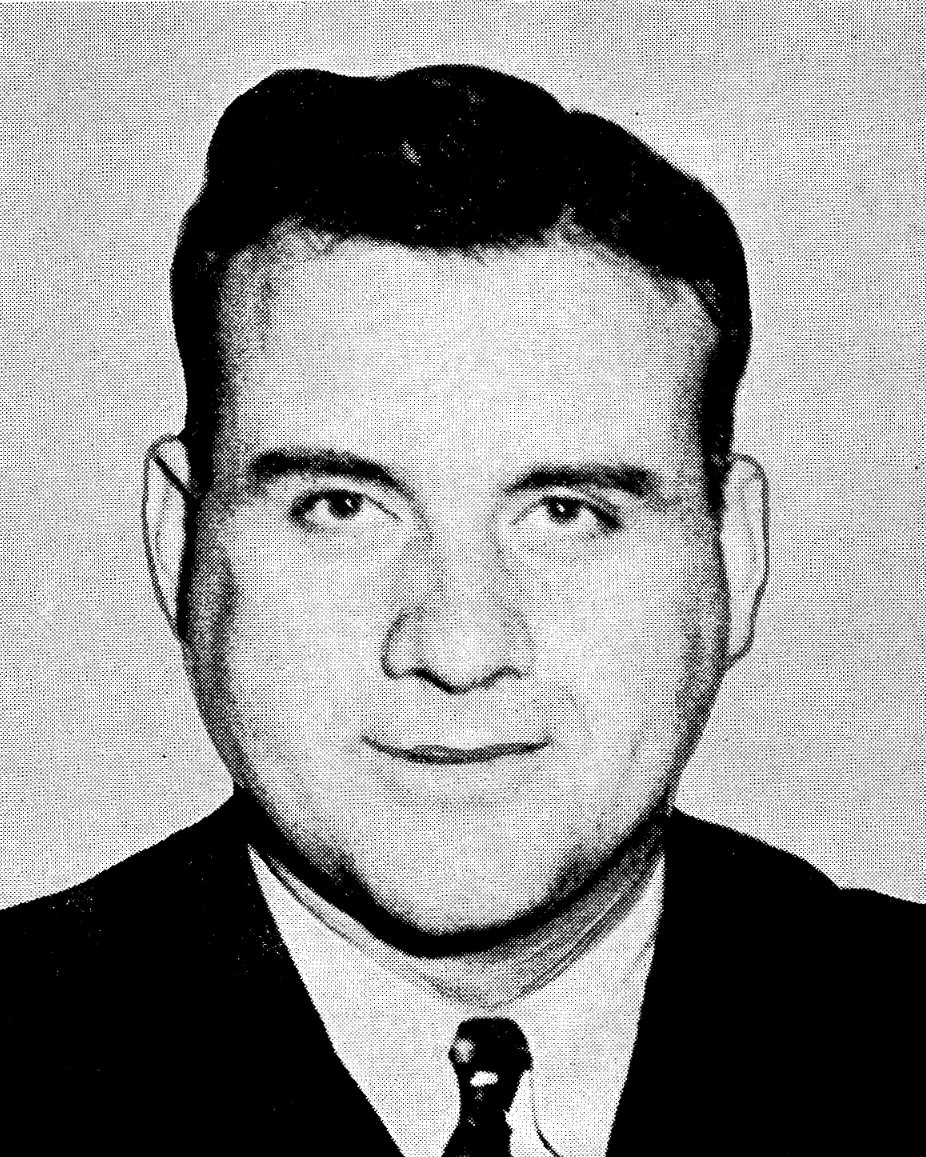
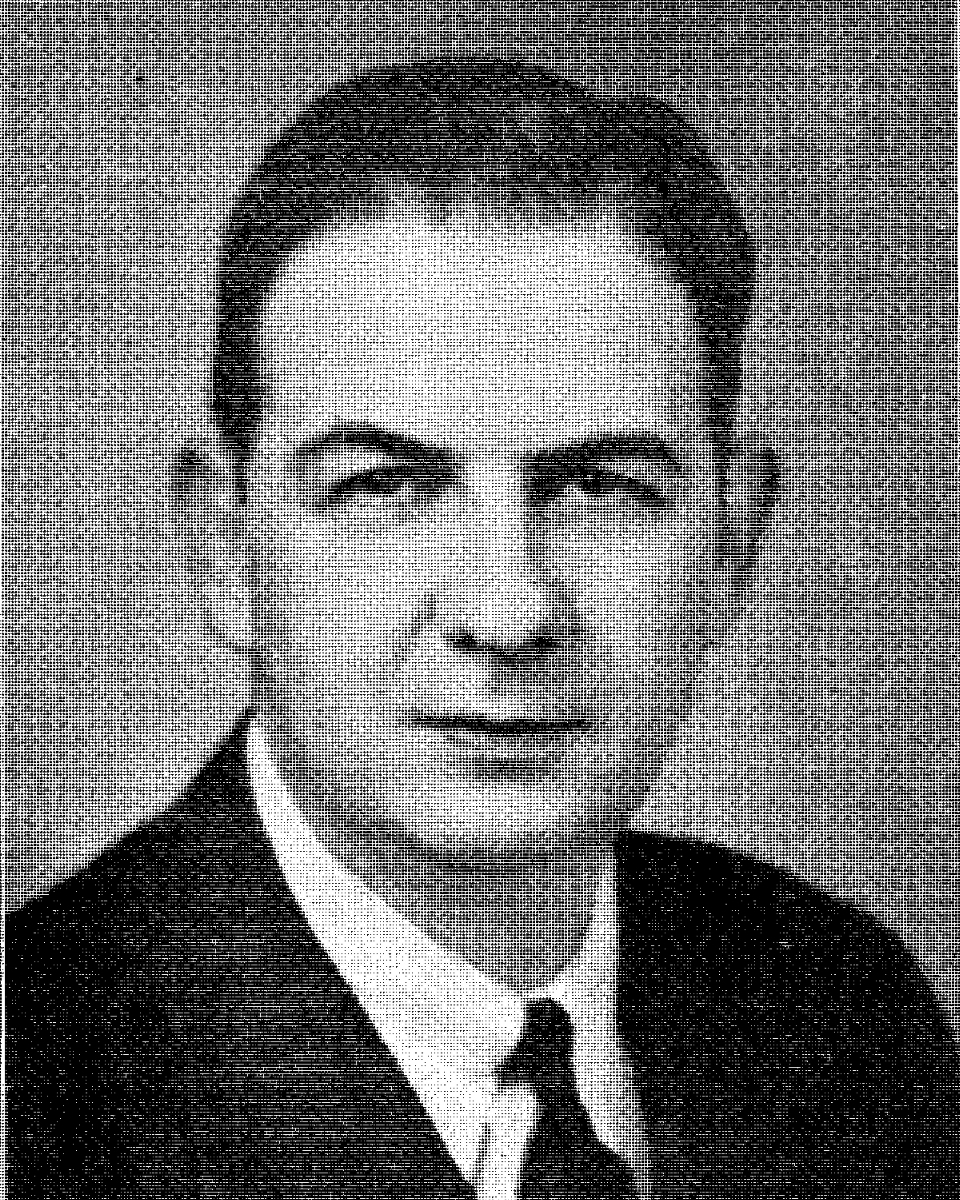
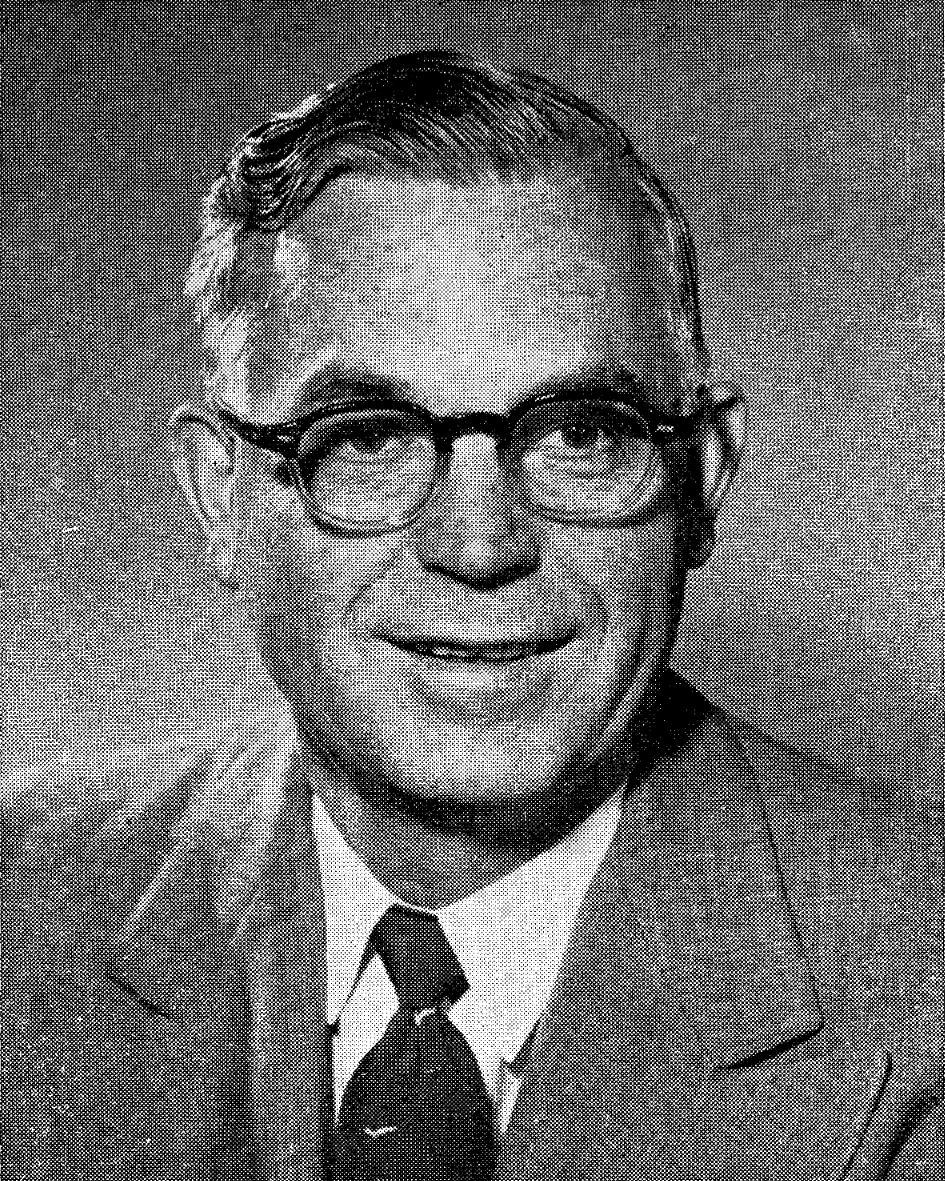
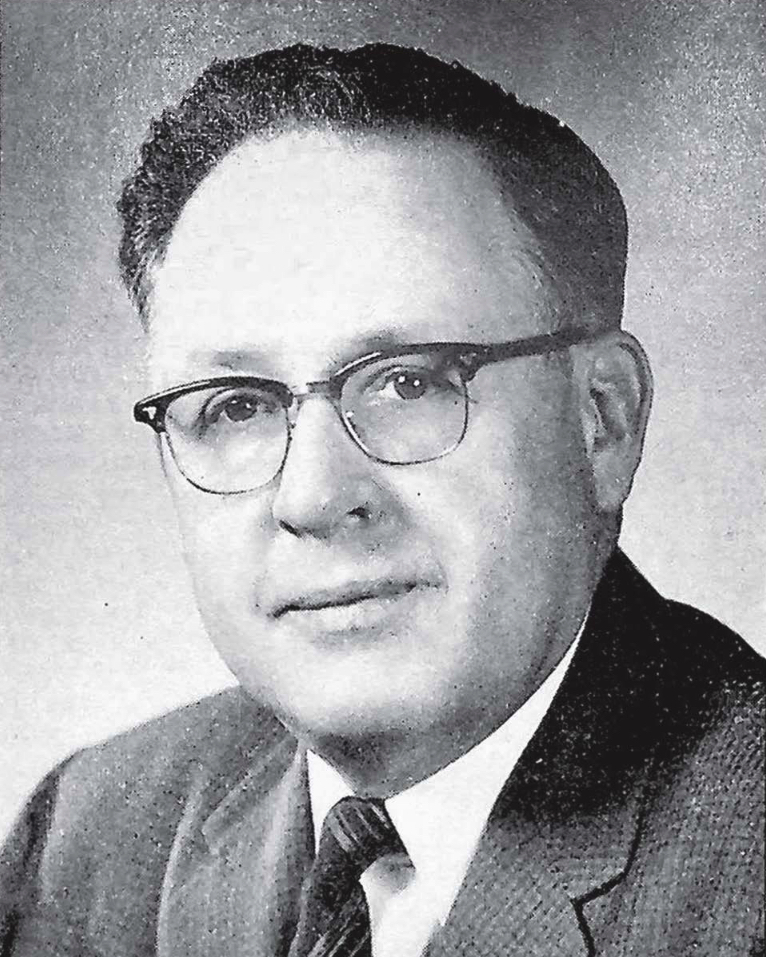
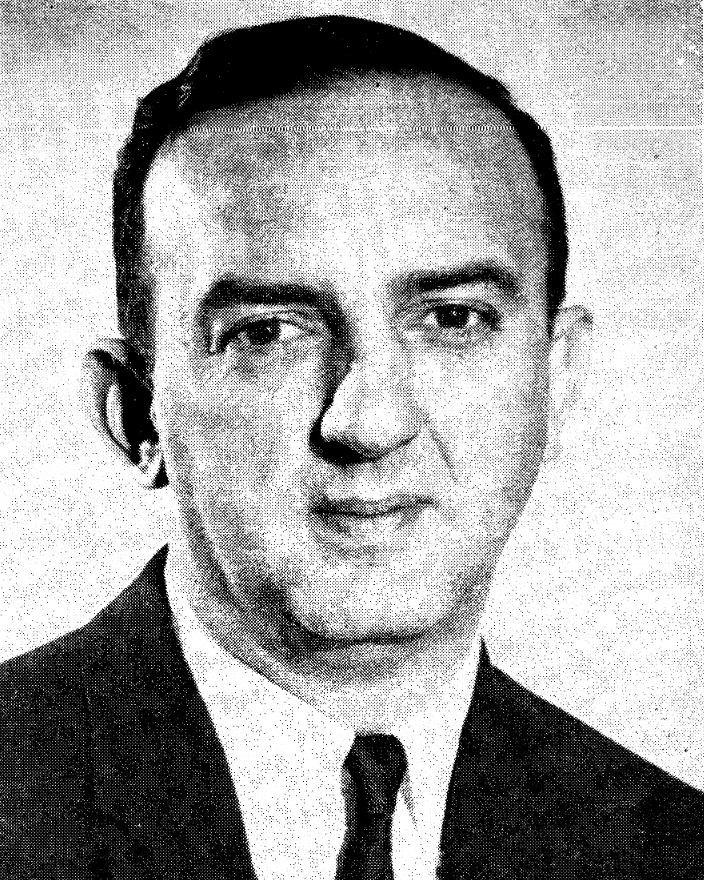
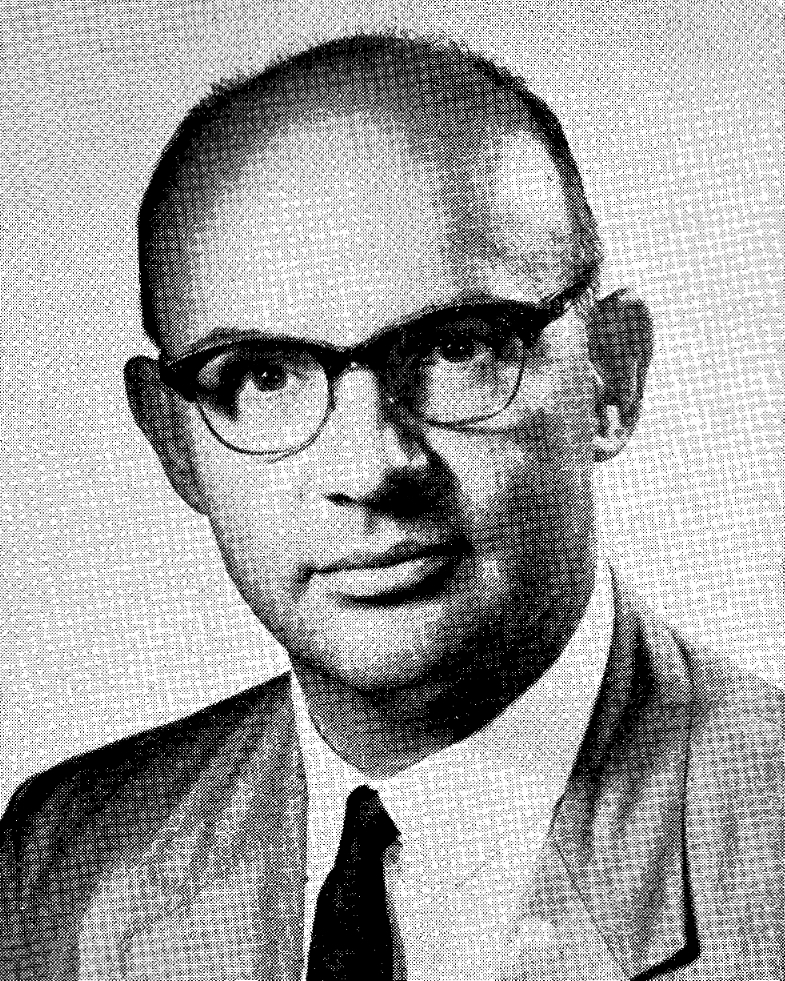
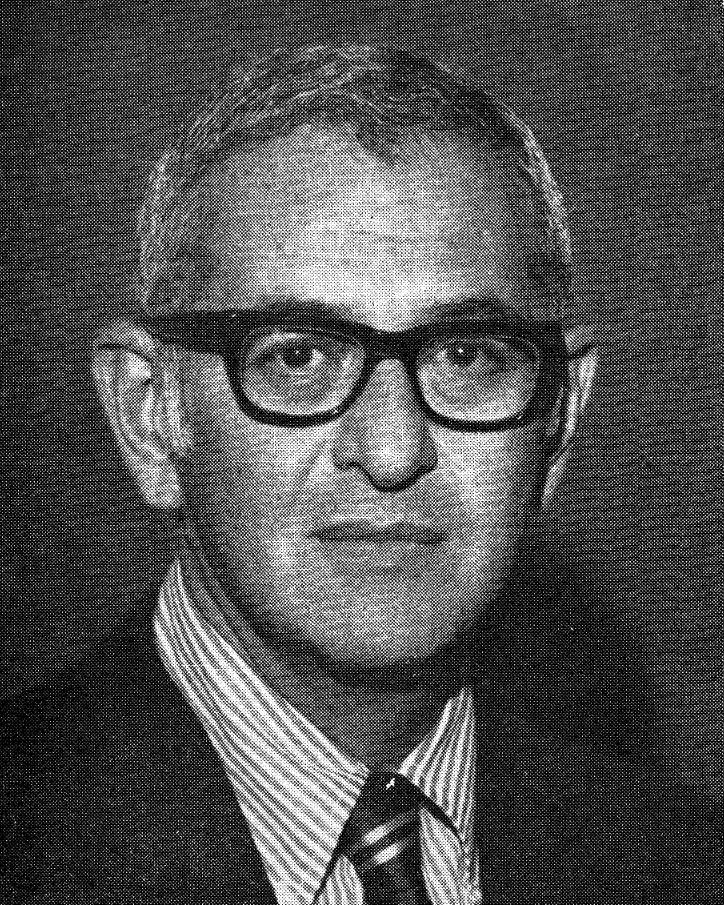
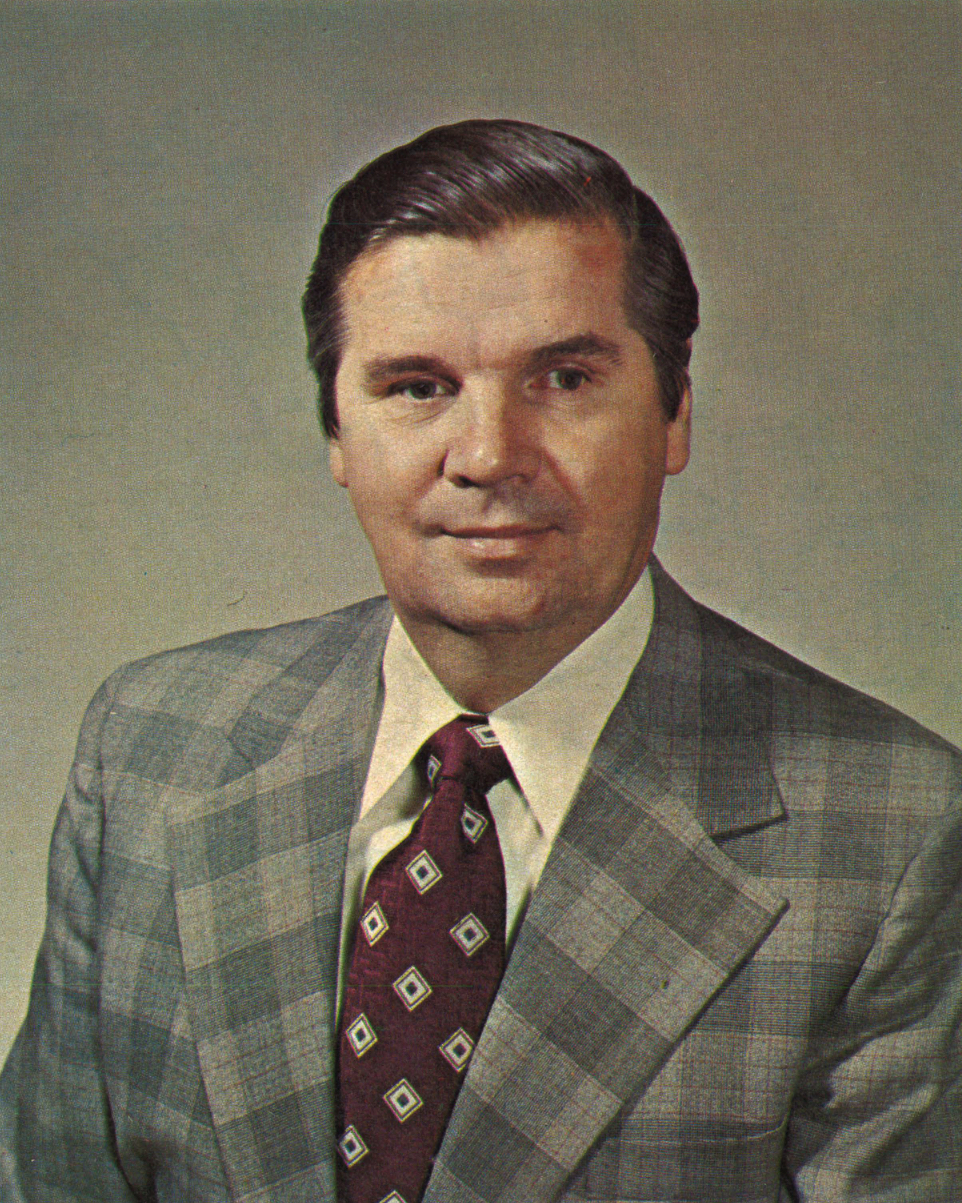
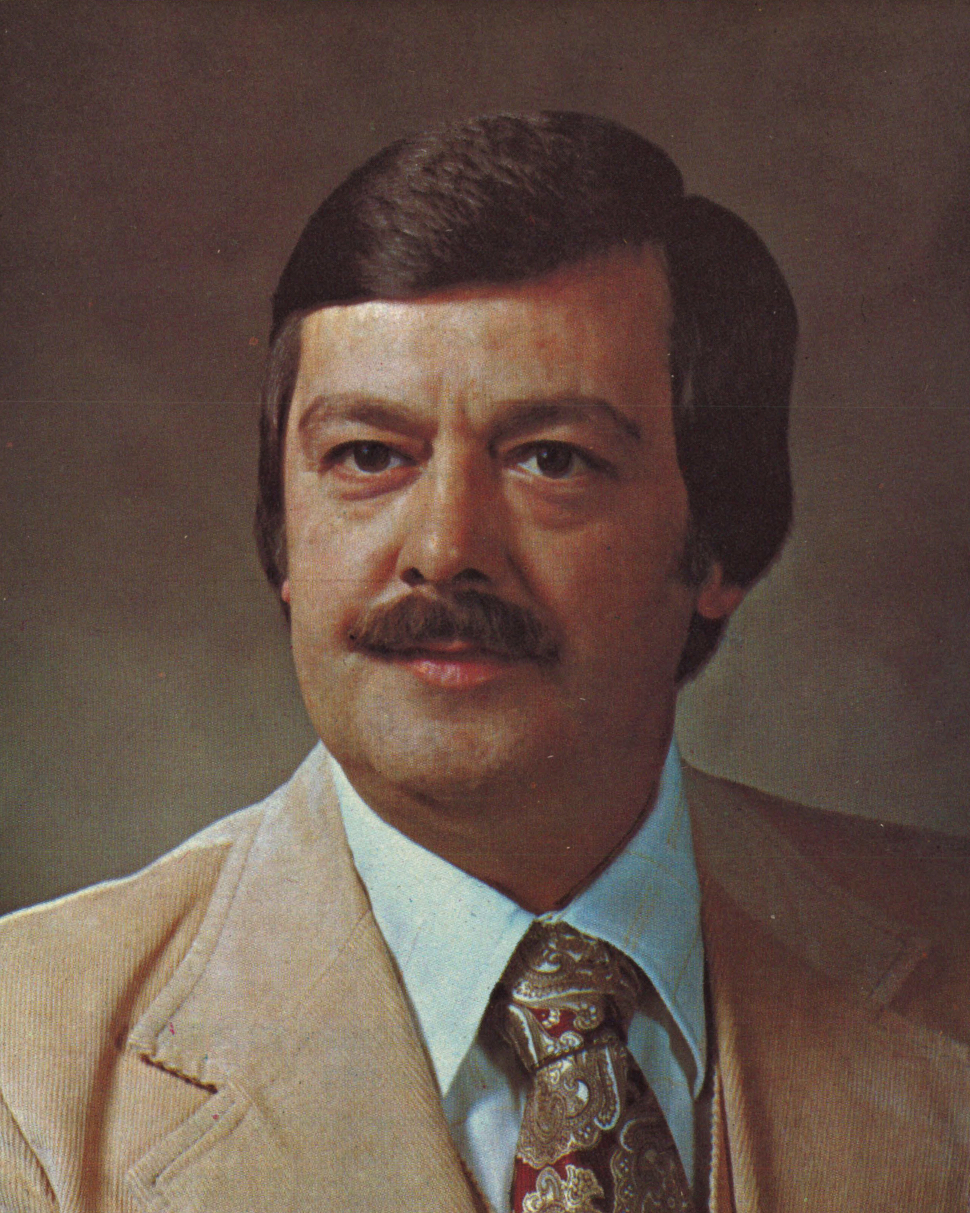
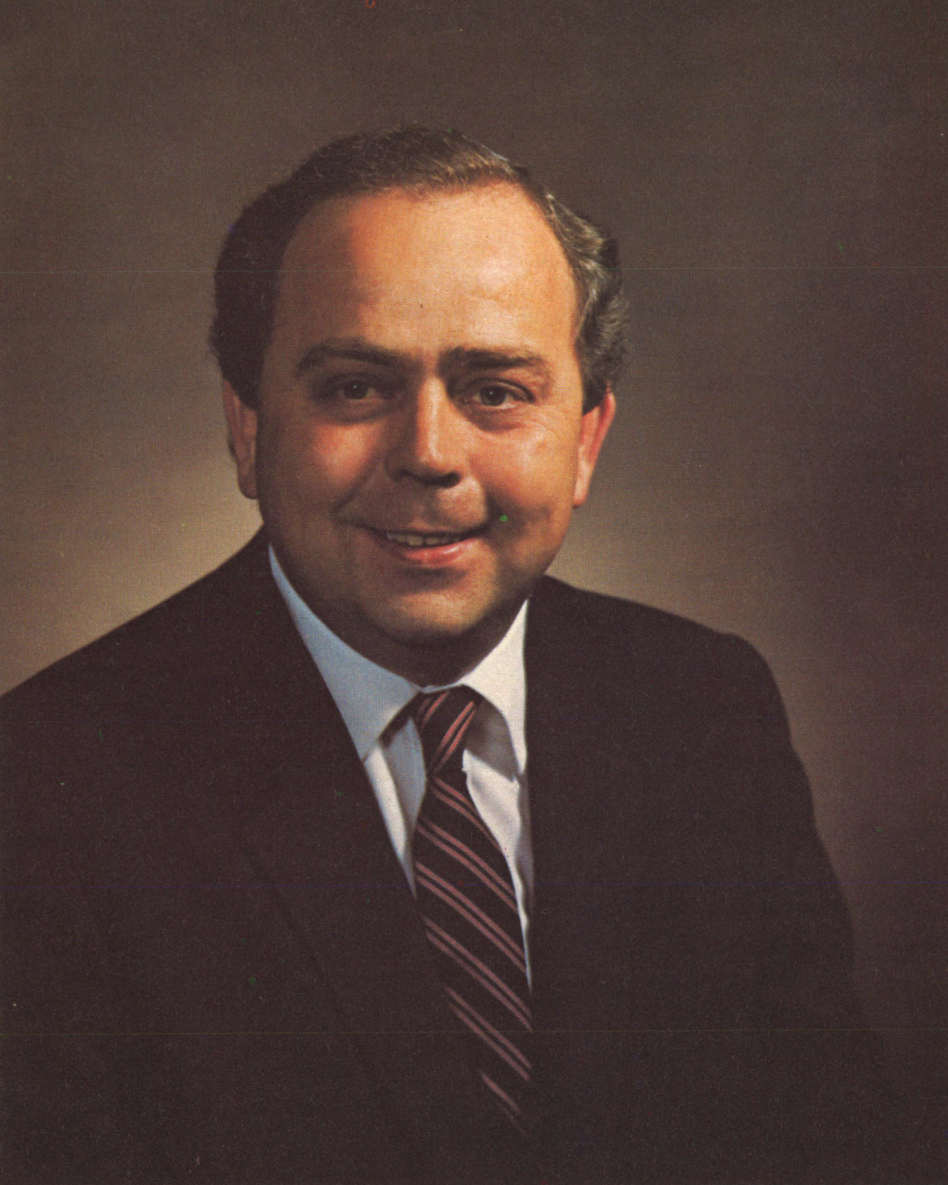
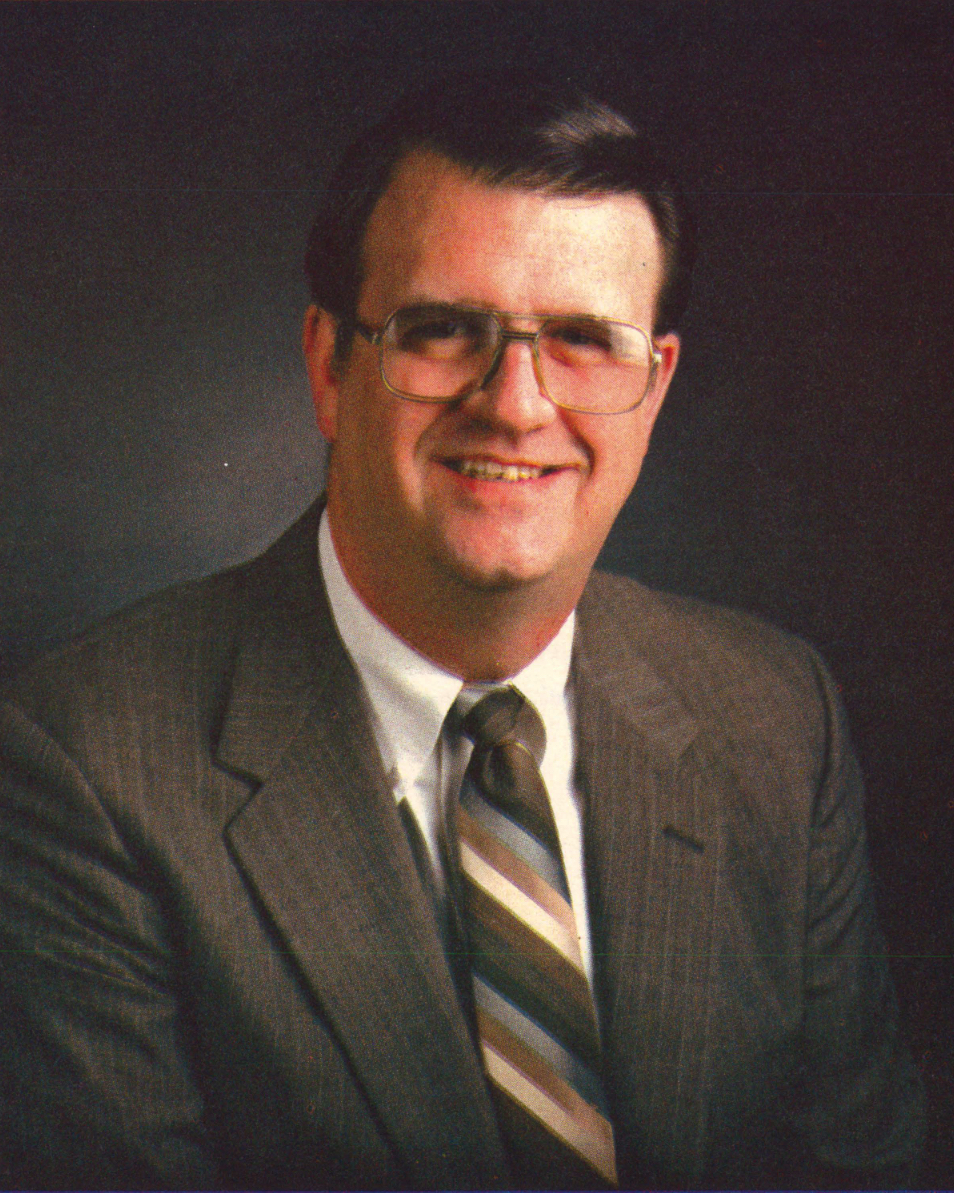
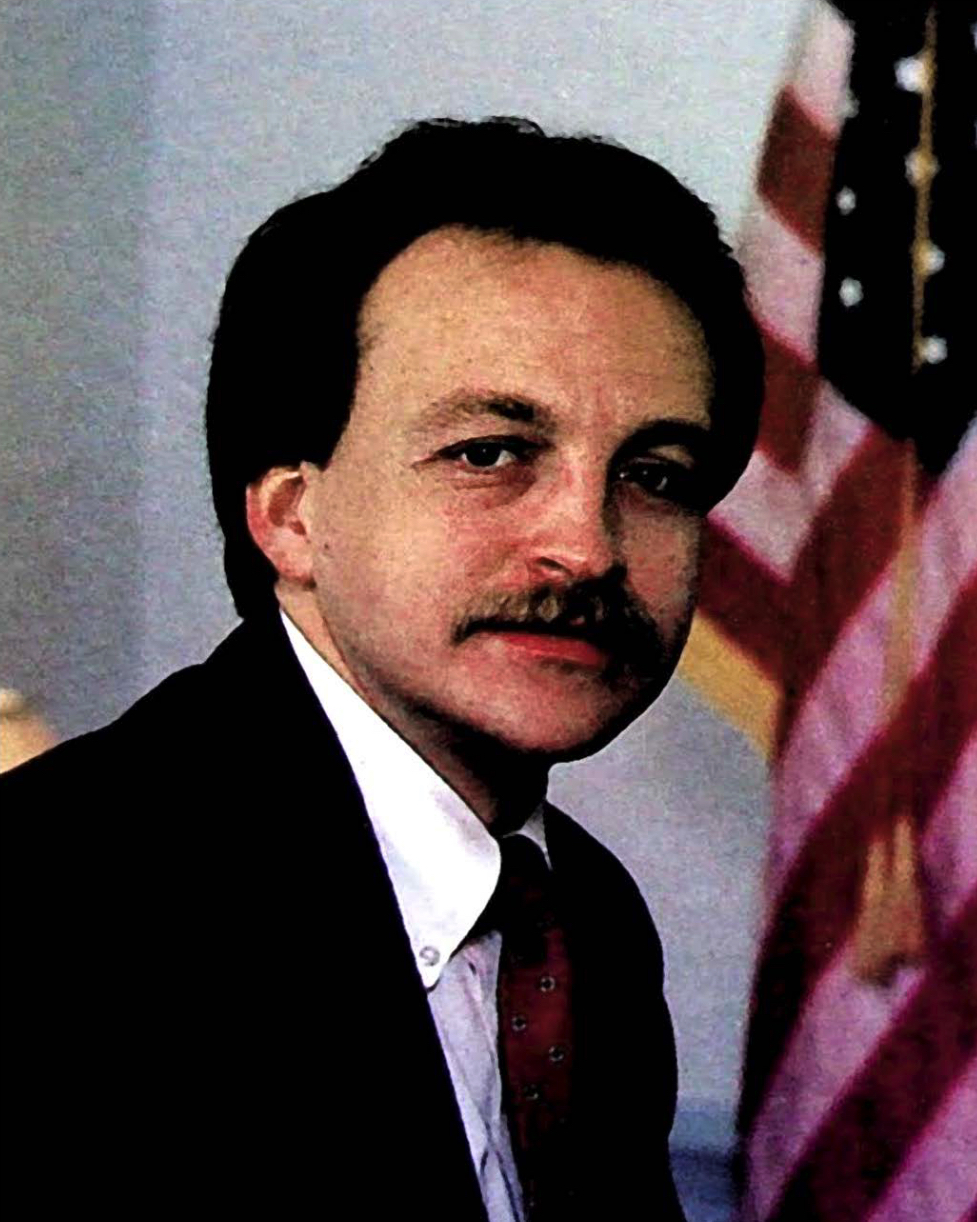
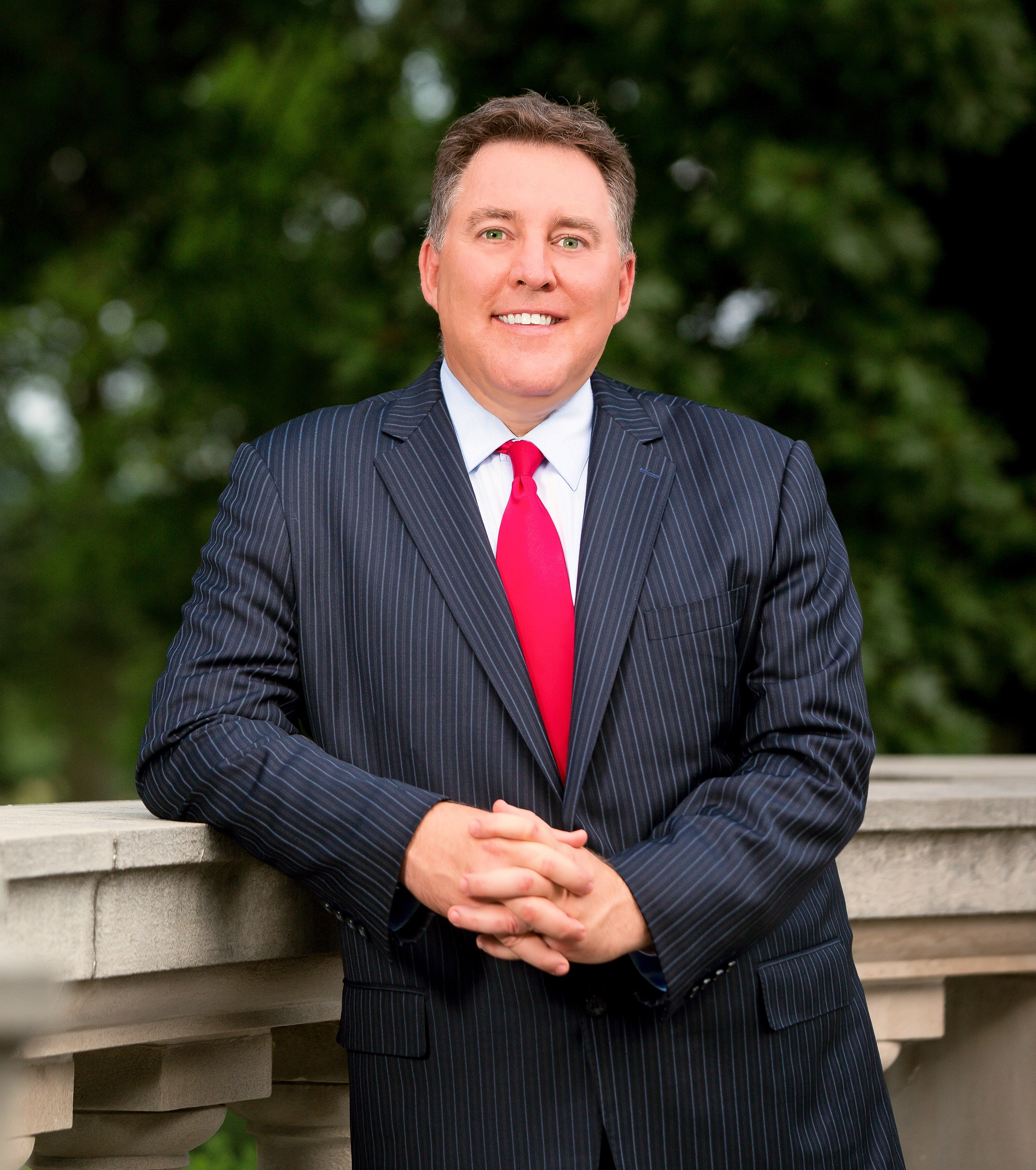
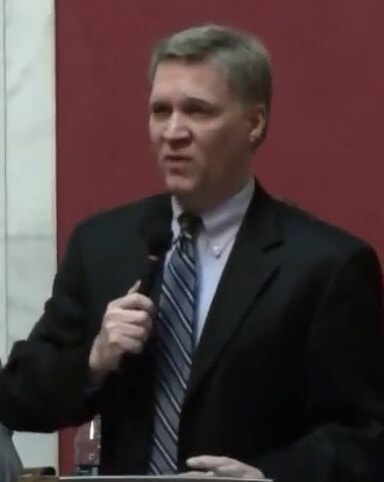
Order	Portrait	Name	Party	Term	Residence
1st		Spicer Patrick	Republican	1863–1864	Kanawha County
2nd		Lee Roy Kramer	Republican	1864–1866	Monongalia County
3rd		David S. Pinnel	Republican	1866–1868	Upshur County
4th		Henry C. McWhorter	Republican	1868–1869	Kanawha County
5th		Solomon S. Fleming	Republican	1869–1870	Harrison County
6th		William M. Welch	Republican	1870–1871	Mineral County
7th		Elbridge G. Cracraft	Democratic	1871–1872	Ohio County
8th		Albert E. Summers	Democratic	1872–1872	Kanawha County
9th		William M. Miller	Democratic	1872–1875	Ohio County
10th		Alexander W. Monroe	Democratic	1875–1877	Hampshire County
11th		Eustace Gibson	Democratic	1877–1879	Cabell County
12th		George H. Moffett	Democratic	1879–1881	Pocahontas County
13th		Emanuel Willis Wilson	Democratic	1881–1883	Kanawha County
14th		Joseph J. Woods	Democratic	1883–1885, 1889–1891	Ohio County
15th		Thomas H. Dennis	Democratic	1885–1887	Greenbrier County
16th		John M. Rowan	Democratic	1887–1889	Monroe County
17th		Louis Bennett	Democratic	1891–1893	Lewis County
18th		David W. Shaw	Democratic	1893–1895	Barbour County
19th		William Seymour Edwards	Republican	1895–1897	Kanawha County
20th		Samuel R. Hanen	Republican	1897–1899	Marshall County
21st		Owen S. McKinney	Democratic	1899–1901	Marion County
22nd		William G. Wilson	Republican	1901–1903	Randolph County
23rd		Frank Moats	Republican	1903–1905	Wood County
24th		Fred Paul Grosscup	Republican	1905–1907	Kanawha County
25th		James A. Seaman	Republican	1907–1909	Jackson County
26th		J.H. Strickling	Republican	1909–1911	Tyler County
27th		C.M. Wetzel	Democratic	1911–1913	Jefferson County
28th		William Taylor George	Republican	1913–1915	Barbour County
29th		Vernon E. Johnson	Republican	1915–1917, 1927–1929	Morgan County
30th		Joseph S. Thurmond	Democratic	1917–1919	Greenbrier County
31st		J. Luther Wolfe	Republican	1919–1921	Jackson County
32nd		Edwin M. Keatley	Republican	1921–1923, 1925–1927	Kanawha County
33rd		W.E.R. Byrne	Democratic	1923–1925	Kanawha County
34th		J. William Cummins	Republican	1929–1931	Ohio County
35th		J. Alfred Taylor	Democratic	1931–1933	Fayette County
36th		Ralph M. Hiner	Democratic	1933–1935	Pendleton County
37th		John J. Pelter	Democratic	1935–1937	Logan County
38th		James Kay Thomas	Democratic	1937–1941	Kanawha County
39th		Malcolm R. Arnold	Democratic	1941–1943	Boone County
40th		John E. Amos	Democratic	1943–1949	Kanawha County
41st		William E. Flannery	Democratic	1949–1958	Logan County
42nd		Harry R. Pauley	Democratic	1958–1961	McDowell County
43rd		Julius W. Singleton Jr.	Democratic	1961–1965	Monongalia County
44th		H. Laban White	Democratic	1965–1969	Harrison County
45th		Ivor F. Boiarsky	Democratic	1969–1971	Kanawha County
46th		Lewis N. McManus	Democratic	1971–1977	Raleigh County
47th		Donald L. Kopp	Democratic	1977–1979	Harrison County
48th		Clyde See Jr.	Democratic	1979–1985	Hardy County
49th		Joseph Albright	Democratic	1985–1987	Wood County
50th		Chuck Chambers	Democratic	1987–1997	Cabell County
51st		Robert S. Kiss	Democratic	1997–2007	Raleigh County
52nd		Richard Thompson	Democratic	2007–2013	Wayne County
53rd		Tim Miley	Democratic	2013–2015	Harrison County
54th		Tim Armstead	Republican	2015–2018	Kanawha County
Acting		John Overington	Republican	2018
55th		Roger Hanshaw	Republican	2018–present	Clay County

== See also ==
- West Virginia Legislature
- West Virginia House of Delegates
- List of West Virginia state legislatures
