= H. Laban White =

American politician

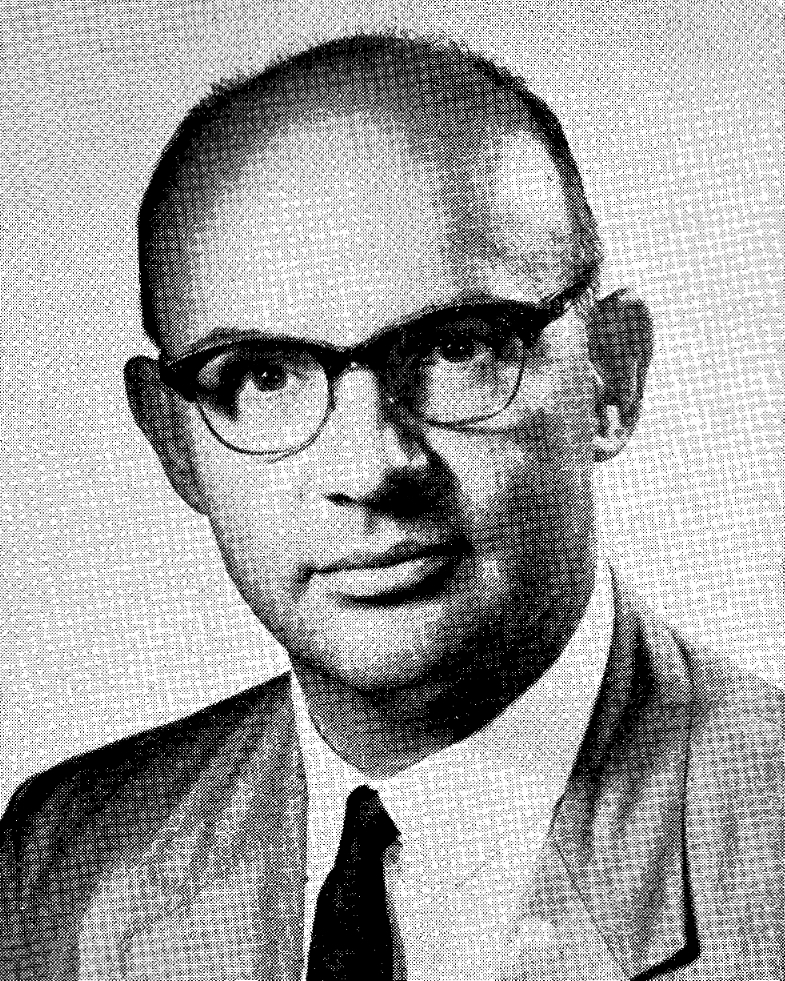

44th Speaker of the West Virginia House of Delegates
- In office 1965–1969
- Preceded by: Julius W. Singleton
- Succeeded by: Ivor F. Boiarsky

Member of the West Virginia House of Delegates from Harrison County
- In office December 1, 1956 – December 1, 1968

Personal details
- Born: Horance Laban White Jr. May 1, 1916 Spencer, West Virginia
- Died: January 31, 2015 (aged 98) Clarksburg, West Virginia
- Party: Democratic
- Spouse: Gwendolyn Beall (m. 1943)

Military service
- Branch/service: United States Army
- Rank: Lieutenant colonel
- Battles/wars: World War II

Horance Laban White Jr. (May 1, 1916 – January 31, 2015) was an attorney and politician from West Virginia who served as Speaker of the West Virginia House of Delegates.
