= Ivor F. Boiarsky =

American politician (1920–1971)

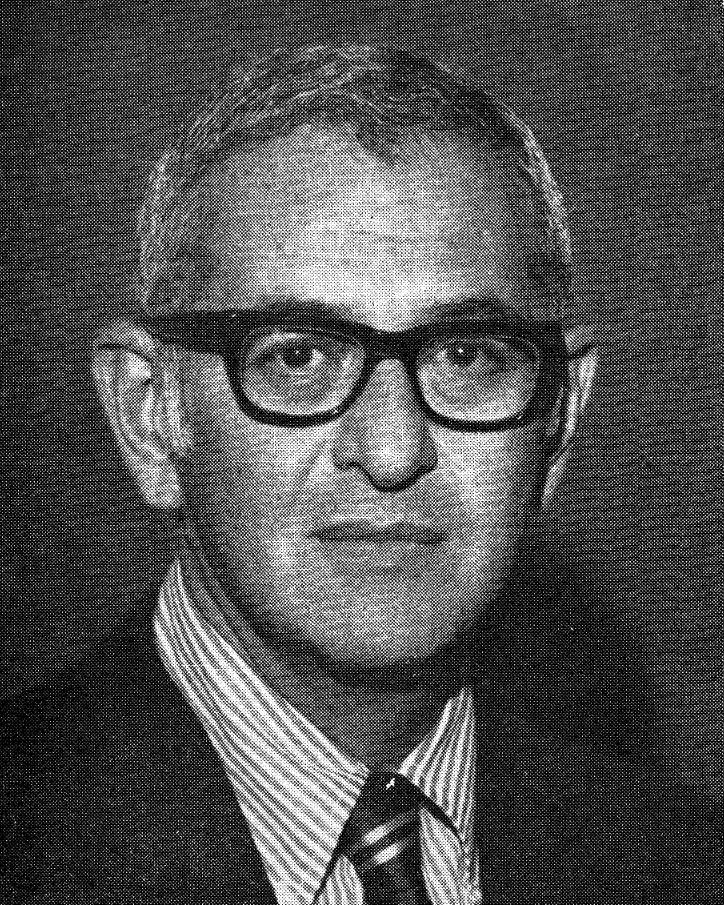

45th Speaker of the West Virginia House of Delegates
- In office 1969–1971
- Preceded by: H. Laban White
- Succeeded by: Lewis N. McManus

Member of the West Virginia House of Delegates from Kanawha County
- In office December 1, 1958 – March 12, 1971

Personal details
- Born: Ivor Franklin Boiarsky; April 7, 1920 Charleston, West Virginia
- Died: March 12, 1971 (aged 50) Charleston, West Virginia
- Party: Democratic
- Spouse: Barbara Polan
- Education: Brown University; University of Virginia

Ivor Franklin Boiarsky (April 7, 1920 – March 12, 1971) was a politician from West Virginia.

He was born in Charleston, Kanawha County, West Virginia. He was a son of Mose and Rae D. Boiarsky. He was educated at Brown University and the University of Virginia law school. He was married to Barbara Faith Polan and was president of Charleston Federal Savings and Loan Association. A Democrat, he served as a member of West Virginia State House of Delegates from Kanawha County from 1959–71, after first losing an attempt in 1952. He served as the chairman of the House Finance Committee prior to his election as speaker in 1968. He served as Speaker of the House of Delegates from 1969 to his death in 1971.

As speaker of the House of Delegates, Boiarsky was co-author of the 1968 Modern Budget Amendment, which gave the governor greater control over the state's annual budget. Boiarsky also wanted the governor to have the authority to transfer funds between departments in state agencies, but that power still rests with the legislature. He was instrumental in creating a consolidated board for higher education in the state, the Board of Regents, that lasted a quarter-century before it was changed back to separate boards for the university system and the colleges.

He was a member of the American Bar Association and is one of a small number of Jewish-American members ever to serve in the West Virginia Legislature.

During his brief tenure as speaker, Boiarsky pushed the House of Delegates to 18- and 20-hour days that ultimately proved to be his downfall. He died at the age of 50, one day after a grueling debate on strip mining that lasted until 2:00 a.m.
