= Dixon Lake =

Dixon Lake may refer to:

- Dixon Lake (Monongalia County), within Pedlar Wildlife Management Area in Monongalia County, West Virginia
- Dixon Lake (Nova Scotia), on Cape Breton Island, Nova Scotia
- Dixon Reservoir in Escondido, California, sometimes known as Dixon Lake
