= Carnifex Ferry Battlefield State Park =

State park in Nicholas County, West Virginia

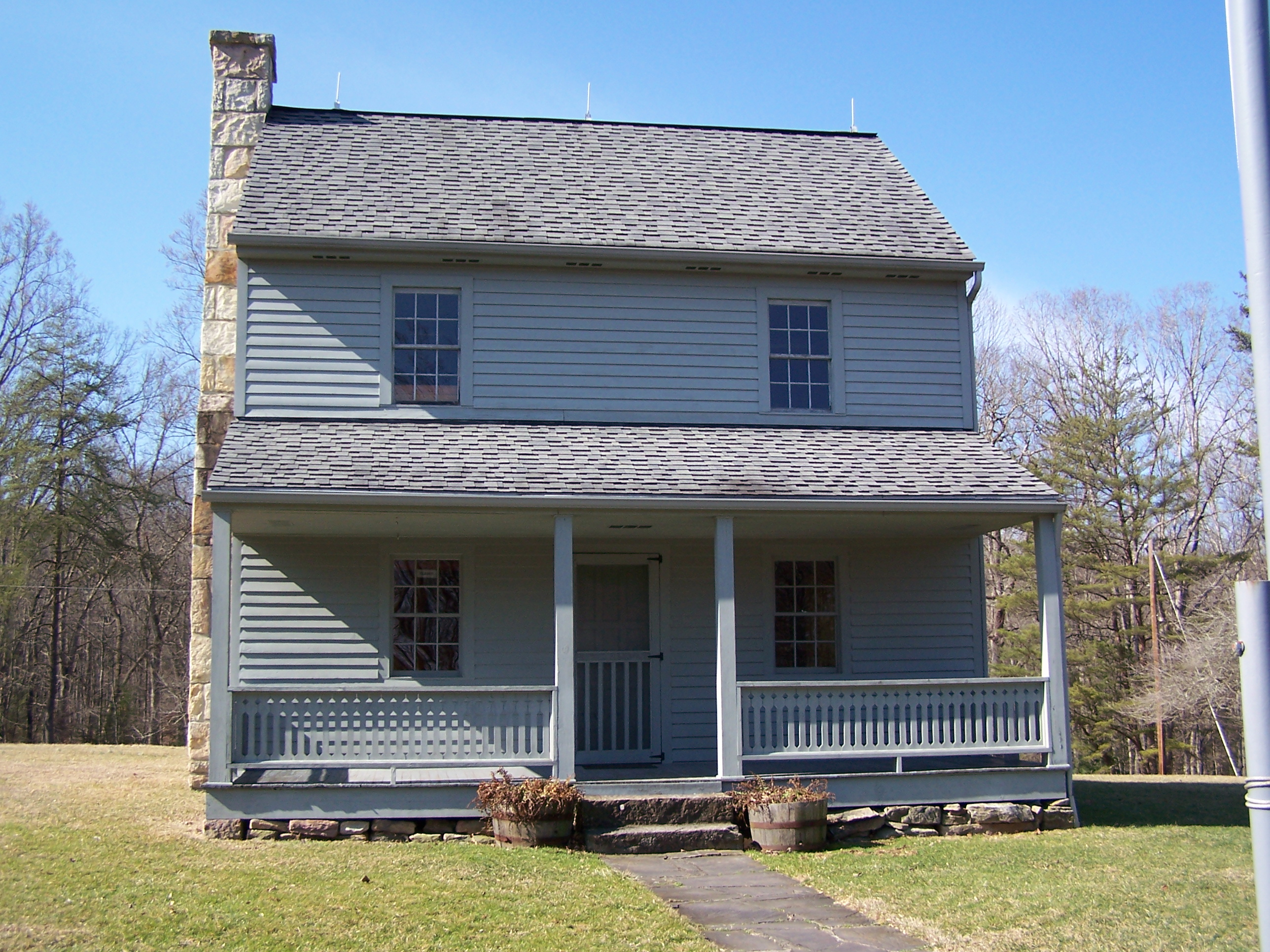
- Patterson House

- Location within West Virginia Location within the United States
- Location: Nicholas, West Virginia, United States
- Coordinates: 38°12′32″N 80°56′19″W
- Area: 156 acres (63 ha)
- Elevation: 1,696 ft (517 m)
- Established: October 28, 1935
- Named for: Battle of Carnifex Ferry
- Governing body: West Virginia Division of Natural Resources
- Website: wvstateparks.com/park/carnifex-ferry-battlefield-state-park/

Carnifex Ferry Battlefield State Park is an American Civil War battle site that commemorates the Battle of Carnifex Ferry. It is located on the rim of the Gauley River Canyon near Summersville, a town in Nicholas County, West Virginia. The 156-acre (0.63 km^{2}) park features Patterson House Museum, three views of the Gauley River, hiking trails and picnic facilities. It is one of the oldest state parks in the United States. A Civil War re-enactment takes place on a weekend after Labor Day. As Carnifex Ferry State Park, it was listed on the National Register of Historic Places in 1974.

== See also ==
- List of West Virginia state parks
- State park
- Summersville Dam
- Summersville Lake
