= List of West Virginia state parks =

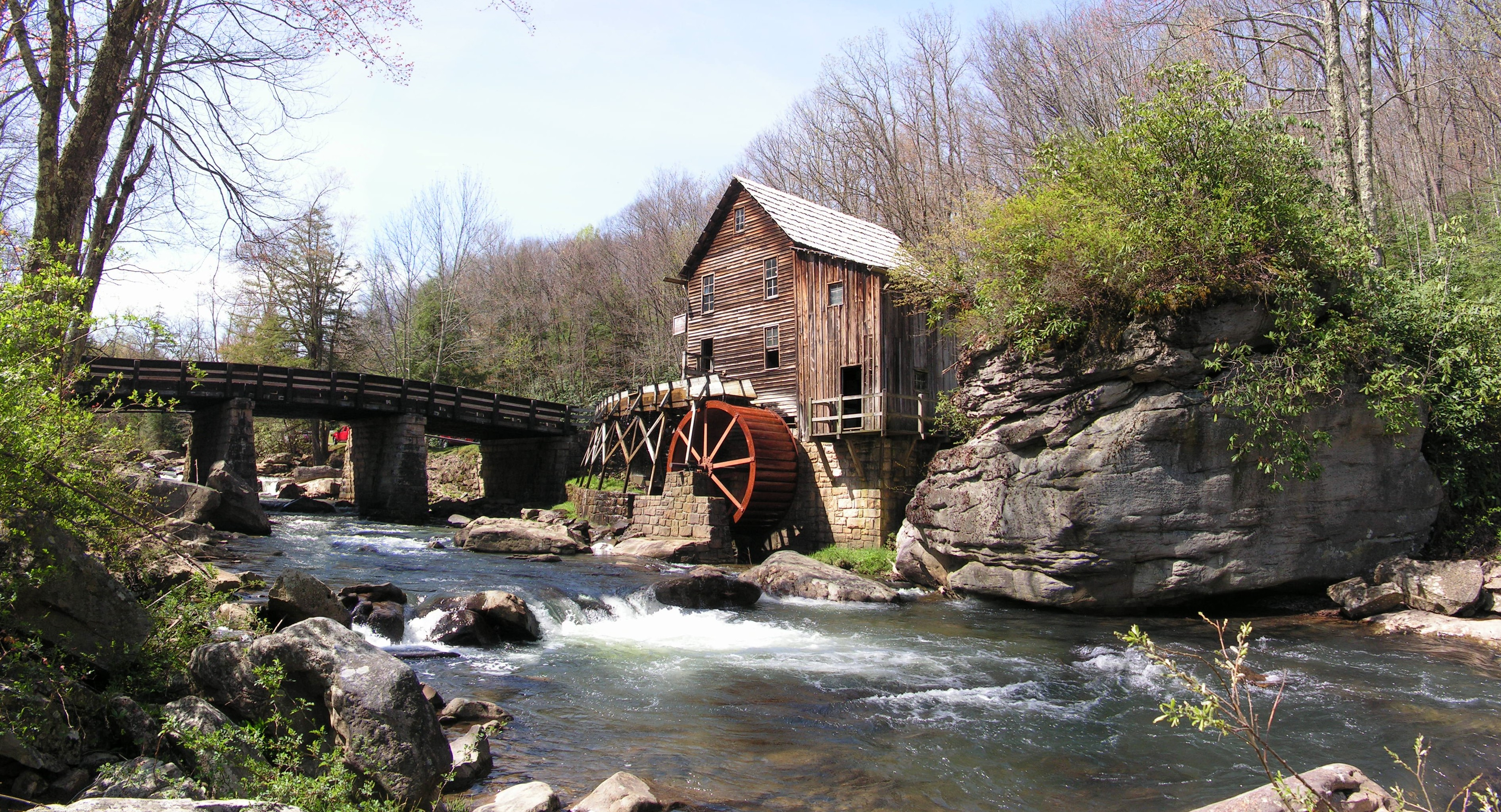
Babcock State Park located along the New River Gorge

There are 39 state parks in the U.S. state of West Virginia as of 2025. (Note: The WVDNR Parks and Recreation Section governs 39 state parks (including three rail trails), according to the West Virginia Blue Book (2018) the West Virginia State Parks website (2025), and the West Virginia Division of Natural Resources (WVDNR) Annual Report 2023–2024. The West Virginia Blue Book (2018) lists the rail trails as part of its Directory of State Parks; however, the West Virginia State Parks website lists the rail trails separately.) The West Virginia Division of Natural Resources (WVDNR) Parks and Recreation Section is the governing body for all 39 state parks and directly operates all but one of them. (Note: Stonewall Jackson Lake is operated through a public–private partnership between the WVDNR Parks and Recreation Section and McCabe-Henley LP.) In addition to state parks, the WVDNR Parks and Recreation Section governs nine state forests.

The first West Virginia state park, Droop Mountain Battlefield, was acquired in 1928 and dedicated in 1929; and the newest state parks, Elk River Trail and Summersville Lake, were established in 2019 and 2023, respectively. Four parks that later joined the state park system were established prior to Droop Mountain, the earliest being the Point Pleasant Monument (now Tu-Endie-Wei) in 1901. There are seven former West Virginia state parks: one state park was transferred to the National Park Service (NPS), one to the West Virginia Division of Culture and History, one to the West Virginia Division of Highways, and one to a municipality, and three have ceased to exist entirely.

This list provides an overview of West Virginia state parks and a brief history of their development and governance since the first state park was dedicated in 1929. State parks range in size from 4 acres (2 ha) to 10,100 acres (4,087 ha). Of the 39 state parks governed by the WVDNR Parks and Recreation Section, 10 are lodge/resort state parks, 25 are cabin, camping, and day-use state parks, and three are rail trails.

== Overview ==
West Virginia's state parks are governed by the West Virginia Division of Natural Resources (WVDNR) Parks and Recreation Section, which is under the jurisdiction of the West Virginia Department of Commerce. The WVDNR Parks and Recreation Section manages a system of 39 state parks (including three rail trails) and eight state forests totaling around 164,000 acres (66,368 ha) of land, which consists of nearly 12,000 acres (4,856 ha) of developed lands with recreational facilities and nearly 152,000 acres (61,512 ha) of undeveloped land. (Note: The WVDNR Parks and Recreation Section refers to all its lands (state parks, rail trails, and state forests) as "state parks", and all data released by the section is inclusive of state parks, rail trails, and state forests as "state parks".) In total, West Virginia has over 1.6 million acres (6,475 km^{2}) of state and federal protected lands. State parks and forests also feature more than 1,400 miles (2,253 km) of hiking trails across 45 areas.

There are state parks in 33 of West Virginia's 55 counties with Pocahontas County having the most at five. WVDNR divides the state into six regional districts to administer its state parks, forests, and wildlife management areas. The largest state park by area is Watoga at 10,100 acres (4,087 ha), and Fairfax Stone and Tu-Endie-Wei are the smallest at four acres (1.6 ha). Four state parks have U.S. Army Corps of Engineers (USACE) dams or reservoirs: Beech Fork, Bluestone, Stonewall Jackson Lake, and Tygart Lake. Nine state parks feature New Deal-era buildings and structures completed between 1933 and 1942; Lost River has the most with 78. (Note: The following nine West Virginia state parks contain New Deal-era buildings and structures: Babcock (46), Cacapon Resort (50), Droop Mountain Battlefield (19), Hawks Nest (10), Holly River (26), Lost River (78), Pinnacle Rock (18), Tomlinson Run (19), and Watoga (72).) Eighteen state parks include resources, properties, or historic districts listed on the National Register of Historic Places (NRHP). (Note: Registration form citations for state parks' NRHP listings are listed in the Remarks column of the Current state parks table.) Cathedral is the only state park designated a National Natural Landmark, and Grave Creek Mound is the only state park to have ever been designated a National Historic Landmark. Stonewall Jackson Lake is the first West Virginia state park to be developed, constructed, financed, and operated through a public–private partnership.

As of 2016, the WVDNR Parks and Recreation Section directly employed more than 400 full-time and around 1,000 seasonal and summer employees who serviced approximately 7.1 million visitors (65% state residents and 35% out-of-state). WVDNR Parks and Recreation Section personnel maintain over 2.5 million square feet (232,258 m^{2}) of indoor space in more than 1,500 buildings in West Virginia state parks and forests, which have an inventory of 818 lodge rooms, 369 cabins, 1,522 campsites, 144 picnic shelters, and 549 playground units. The total economic impact of West Virginia state parks and forests annually is between US$160.5 million and $189.5 million and for every $1 of general tax revenue provided to state parks and forests in 2016, $13.15 on average was generated in fresh revenue for the state. In 2016, visitors to state parks and forests spent $226.5 million throughout the state, of which 46% ($103.6 million) was spent by out-of-state visitors. The total economic activity attributed to visitors of state parks and forests in 2016 totaled between $213.4 million and $248.7 million.

West Virginia state parks map with 39 clickable links

== History ==
West Virginia's lumber and mineral exploitation had caused tremendous damage to much of its natural environment by the early 20th century. The state recognized the need to designate and protect lands worthy of conservation, and in 1925 the West Virginia Legislature established the West Virginia State Forest, Park and Conservation Commission to assess the state's opportunities and needs for forests, parks, game preserves, and recreational areas. West Virginia's state park system began to take shape in January of that year, when the Commission purchased land in Pocahontas County for a wildlife and timber preserve that later developed into Watoga.

In their report to the Legislature in 1927, the Commission recommended that scenic natural areas be acquired and administered by a State Park System under the State Game and Fish Commission and that historical monuments be administered by a State Monuments System. They also identified a list of potential scenic and historic state park sites. (Note: In its report to the West Virginia Legislature in 1927, the West Virginia State Forest, Park and Conservation Commission recommended the following locations for scenic state parks: Blennerhassett Island in Wood County, Coopers Rock in Monongalia and Preston counties, Cranberry Glades and its surrounding area in Pocahontas County, Hawks Nest in Fayette County, Pinnacle Rock in Mercer County, and the intersection of the Seneca and Midland trails in Greenbrier County. Seneca Rocks and Smoke Hole Caverns were also recommended; however, the Commission acknowledged that both were slated to join the new Monongahela National Forest. The Commission also recommended the following locations for historic state parks: the Battle of Philippi battlefield in Barbour County, Berkeley Springs in Morgan County, the Caddell Rifle Range near Kingwood in Preston County, Droop Mountain in Pocahontas County, Fort Ashby in Mineral County, the Grave Creek Mound in Marshall County, the James Rumsey Monument in Jefferson County, the Morgan Morgan Monument in Berkeley County, and the Point Pleasant Monument in Mason County. The Commission also deferred to the West Virginia Historical Society for further recommended historic sites for preservation as state parks.) One of these recommended sites became West Virginia's first state park, Droop Mountain Battlefield, also in Pocahontas County. The park was acquired in 1928 and dedicated on July 4, 1929, to commemorate one of the largest battles in West Virginia during the American Civil War. Four other historic locations recommended by the commission had already been established and would later become state parks; the earliest of these was the Point Pleasant Monument (now Tu-Endie-Wei), which had been acquired by the state in 1901 and dedicated in 1909. (Note: Four parks established prior to Droop Mountain would later join the park system: the Point Pleasant Monument (now Tu-Endie-Wei) in Mason County was established in 1901 and became a state park in 1956; the Grave Creek Mound in Marshall County was acquired by the state in 1909 and administered by the West Virginia State Penitentiary warden until becoming a state park in 1970; the James Rumsey Monument in Jefferson County was dedicated in 1915 and made a state park in 1956; and the Morgan Morgan Monument in Berkeley County was erected in 1924 and became a state park in 1956.)

The Legislature established the West Virginia Conservation Commission Division of State Parks in 1933 to manage the state's growing park system, and to leverage the resources and expertise of the National Park Service (NPS), Civilian Conservation Corps (CCC), Works Progress Administration (WPA), and other New Deal-era programs for further park development. By 1945, the Division of State Parks had expanded to 13 state parks with the addition of its first USACE reservoir park at Tygart Lake. Because African Americans were denied access to West Virginia's state parks and forests, the Division of State Parks created the only state park on the basis of racial segregation, Booker T. Washington State Park, in 1949. African Americans were restricted from the remainder of the state park and forest systems until the park and forest systems' integration following the Brown v. Board of Education decision by the United States Supreme Court in May 1954.

By 1950, the Division of State Parks was operating 16 state parks totaling 35,973 acres (14,558 ha) and by 1954, the state had expanded to 20 state parks totaling 40,355 acres (16,331 ha). That year, the NPS noted that West Virginia had made "large percentage gains" in adding refreshments facilities to its park system, which totaled 11. Revenue bonds allowed the park system to expand and upgrade recreational facilities and lodging throughout the 1950s, and by 1960, the Division of State Parks was operating 24 state parks consisting of 40,987 acres (16,587 ha). During the 1960s, the Economic Development Administration (EDA) federal loan program allowed the state to add three new parks to its system: Canaan Valley Resort, Pipestem Resort, and Twin Falls Resort. Visitors to West Virginia state parks and forests totaled 4.3 million by 1968 and almost 5 million in 1971. Following the Legislature's passing of the Economic Development Act of 1985, the West Virginia Division of Parks and Recreation was transferred from the West Virginia Conservation Commission to the West Virginia Department of Commerce, where it remains today. The most recent additions to the West Virginia state park system, Elk River Trail and Summersville Lake, were added in 2019 and 2023, respectively.

== Current state parks ==
Current West Virginia state parks
Park name	Image	County and location	Area in acres (ha)	Date of establishment	Streams and/or lakes	Remarks
Audra	Category:Audra State Park on Wikimedia Commons	Barbour and Upshur; 39°02′25″N 80°03′55″W	355 acres (144 ha)	1950	Middle Fork River	Former site of the commercial logging town of Audra and of Barbour County's first 4-H camp. The park's Alum Cave is formed at the base of a sandstone formation, where it makes contact with pyritiferous shale.
Babcock	Category:Babcock State Park on Wikimedia Commons	Fayette; 37°59′38″N 80°58′16″W	4,127 acres (1,670 ha)	1934	Boley Lake; Glade Creek; Manns Creek	Named for previous owner Edward V. Babcock, the park contains two architectural landmarks: its administration building, one of the major Civilian Conservation Corps (CCC) accomplishments in West Virginia, and Glade Creek Grist Mill, one of the most photographed structures in West Virginia. Completed in 1976, the mill is a working monument to the more than 500 mills formerly located in the state. A historic district containing the park's CCC resources is listed on the NRHP.
Beartown	Category:Beartown State Park on Wikimedia Commons	Greenbrier and Pocahontas; 38°03′08″N 80°16′35″W	110 acres (45 ha)	1970	None	Trails wind through a network of crevices between massive fragmented boulders, which are a part of the "Droop Sandstone" formation. Large elephant ear lichens (Lobaria pulmonaria) in the "Big Beartown" section of the park are more than 500 years old.
Beech Fork	Category:Beech Fork State Park on Wikimedia Commons	Cabell and Wayne; 38°18′05″N 82°19′50″W	3,860 acres (1,562 ha)	1978	Beech Fork Lake; Long Branch	Includes the 720-acre (290 ha) Beech Fork Lake, a reservoir created by a U.S. Army Corps of Engineers (USACE) dam.
Berkeley Springs	Category:Berkeley Springs State Park on Wikimedia Commons	Morgan; 39°37′35″N 78°13′45″W	7 acres (3 ha)	1970	Warm Spring Run	Listed on the NRHP. The park's springs, held in trust for the public since 1776, were known by European settlers as early as 1736 and were frequented by Lord Fairfax and George Washington. The temperature of the spring water remains at a constant 74.3 degrees Fahrenheit (23.5 degrees Celsius).
Blackwater Falls	Category:Blackwater Falls State Park on Wikimedia Commons	Tucker; 39°06′43″N 79°29′43″W	2,358 acres (954 ha)	1937	Blackwater River; North Fork Blackwater River; Pendleton Lake	Major attractions include 63-foot (19 m) Blackwater Falls, 8-mile (13 km) Blackwater Canyon, Elakala Falls on Shays Run, and Pendleton Falls on Pendleton Run. The park's original forests were completely lumbered by 1924, and the current secondary forests were spurred by a CCC reforestation program in the 1930s.
Blennerhassett Island Historical	Category:Blennerhassett Island Historical State Park on Wikimedia Commons	Wood; 39°16′16″N 81°37′34″W	511 acres (207 ha)	1989	Ohio River	The park is divided between two facilities: a museum in Parkersburg and 511-acre (207 ha) Blennerhassett Island, which contains the reconstructed (1984–1991) Palladian-style Blennerhassett Mansion, originally completed in 1800. The island is accessible by paddle steamers May through October and is listed on the NRHP.
Bluestone	Category:Bluestone State Park on Wikimedia Commons	Summers; 37°37′05″N 80°56′09″W	2,155 acres (872 ha)	1950	Bluestone River; Bluestone Lake; New River; Pipestem Creek	Named for the bluish-gray shale between sandstone deposits. Adjoins Bluestone Lake, the state's second largest body of water, which was formed as a result of Bluestone Dam, completed by the USACE in 1948.
Cacapon Resort	Category:Cacapon Resort State Park on Wikimedia Commons	Morgan; 39°31′06″N 78°18′34″W	6,115 acres (2,475 ha)	1937	Cacapon Lake; Cacapon State Park Lake; Indian Run tributaries	Initially constructed by the CCC beginning in 1937, with facility expansions in the 1950s and the addition of a Robert Trent Jones golf course in 1973, the park is considered a showcase of the state park system due its proximity to the Baltimore–Washington metropolitan area. The state park system's first wobble clay shooting range was opened here in 2007. A historic district containing the park's CCC resources is listed on the NRHP.
Camp Creek (Note: The WVDNR Parks and Recreation Section administers Camp Creek State Forest and Camp Creek State Park together under a single superintendent.)	Category:Camp Creek State Park on Wikimedia Commons	Mercer; 37°30′29″N 81°07′58″W	500 acres (202 ha)	1987	Camp Creek	Formed from Camp Creek State Forest in 1987, when a tract of 500 acres (202 ha) was set aside to create this recreation area. It is administered with Camp Creek State Forest.
Canaan Valley Resort	Category:Canaan Valley Resort State Park on Wikimedia Commons	Tucker; 39°01′38″N 79°27′43″W	6,120 acres (2,477 ha)	1957	Blackwater River	One of three state parks, along with Pipestem Resort and Twin Falls Resort, planned in the 1960s with funds from the Economic Development Administration (EDA). Contains the first ski facility in West Virginia, opened in 1971.
Carnifex Ferry Battlefield	Category:Carnifex Ferry Battlefield State Park on Wikimedia Commons	Nicholas; 38°12′32″N 80°56′22″W	165 acres (67 ha)	1931	Gauley River	Site of 1861 American Civil War Battle of Carnifex Ferry, which secured Union control of western Virginia and eventually led to the formation of West Virginia. The park, which includes Patteson House, a restored mid-19th-century farmhouse, is listed on the NRHP.
Cass Scenic Railroad	Category:Cass Scenic Railroad State Park on Wikimedia Commons	Pocahontas; 38°26′55″N 79°55′38″W	940 acres (380 ha)	1961	Greenbrier River; Leatherbark Run	A former logging spur, the park's scenic railroad climbs West Virginia's second-tallest peak, Bald Knob. In addition to the railroad, the state acquired the town of Cass and restored 13 of its former company houses as rental units for park visitors, creating West Virginia's only restored company town complete with the Cass Country Store. The park is listed on the NRHP.
Cathedral	Category:Cathedral State Park on Wikimedia Commons	Preston; 39°19′35″N 79°32′19″W	133 acres (54 ha)	1942	Rhine Creek	Formerly known as Brookside Woods, the park is a 133-acre (54 ha) stand of uncut old-growth forest and contains the only remaining stand of virgin Eastern hemlock (Tsuga canadensis) in West Virginia. The park is entirely contained within the Brookside Historic District, which is listed on the NRHP. It was also designated a National Natural Landmark by the National Park Service.
Cedar Creek	Category:Cedar Creek State Park on Wikimedia Commons	Gilmer; 38°52′54″N 80°51′44″W	2,588 acres (1,047 ha)	1953	Cedar Creek	Contains two relocated structures of historic significance: the Log Cabin Service Station (1928), which now serves as the park office and nature center, and Pine Run School (1909), a one-room country schoolhouse with period furnishings.
Chief Logan (Note: The WVDNR Parks and Recreation Section operates Chief Logan Lodge and Conference Center and Chief Logan State Park under separate management teams. While they are occasionally listed and counted separately in Parks and Recreation Section media, they are included together in this list as Chief Logan State Park.)	Category:Chief Logan State Park on Wikimedia Commons	Logan; 37°53′57″N 82°00′46″W	3,303 acres (1,337 ha)	1961	Buffalo Creek	Formerly a part of the Merrill Coal Company camp, now minus the camp's houses, mining equipment, and tipple. Performed at the park is The Aracoma Story, a historical drama about Aracoma, the daughter of Cornstalk, and the Shawnee tribespeople who lived at the present-day location.
Droop Mountain Battlefield	Category:Droop Mountain Battlefield State Park on Wikimedia Commons	Pocahontas; 38°06′43″N 80°16′17″W	287 acres (116 ha)	1928	None	Site of the one of West Virginia's largest engagements during the American Civil War, and listed on the NRHP. Dedicated on July 4, 1929, it was the first state park established in West Virginia. In 1935, the CCC built the park's iconic wooden observation tower and a rental cabin that now serves as a museum.
Elk River Trail	Category:Elk River Trail on Wikimedia Commons	Braxton, Clay, and Kanawha; 38°32′03″N 81°02′15″W	—	2019	Elk River	Once fully completed, this trail will span 73-mile (117 km) along the Elk River, from Falling Rock in Kanawha County to Braxton County. The trail includes sections of the former Buffalo Creek and Gauley Railroad and the Coal and Coke Railway.
Fairfax Stone Historical Monument	Category:Fairfax Stone Historical Monument State Park on Wikimedia Commons	Grant, Preston, and Tucker; 39°11′42″N 79°29′14″W	4 acres (2 ha)	1957	North Branch; Potomac River headwaters	The park contains the Fairfax Stone historic marker, which traditionally marked the western boundary of Lord Fairfax's Northern Neck Proprietary and is responsible for the present-day boundary between Maryland and West Virginia. The park is listed on the NRHP.
Greenbrier River Trail	Category:Greenbrier River Trail on Wikimedia Commons	Greenbrier and Pocahontas; 37°59′42″N 80°17′55″W	936 acres (379 ha)	1980	Greenbrier River	The trail is a 78-mile (126 km) section of a former Chesapeake and Ohio Railway line between North Caldwell and Cass.
Hawks Nest	Category:Hawks Nest State Park on Wikimedia Commons	Fayette; 38°07′26″N 81°07′08″W	370 acres (150 ha)	1935	Hawks Nest Lake; Mill Creek; New River; Turkey Creek	Planned by the NPS and built by the CCC, the park features an aerial tramway to a marina on the New River, and its overlook allows for panoramic views of New River Gorge. Its lodge was designed by The Architects Collaborative (TAC). A 71-acre (29 ha) historic district containing the park's CCC resources is listed on the NRHP.
Holly River	Category:Holly River State Park on Wikimedia Commons	Webster; 38°39′53″N 80°20′04″W	8,294 acres (3,357 ha)	1938	Laurel Fork of Holly River	The park's land was salvaged in 1937 following its purchase by the Farm Security Administration (FSA) for the purposes of reforestation and stream reclamation following extensive logging operations in the area. The park's historic district containing 93 Works Progress Administration (WPA) resources was listed on the NRHP.
Little Beaver	Category:Little Beaver State Park on Wikimedia Commons	Raleigh; 37°44′42″N 81°05′02″W	562 acres (227 ha)	1971	Little Beaver Creek; Little Beaver Lake	Originally developed as a Raleigh County recreation area by the CCC in the late 1930s. Used as a county 4-H camp from 1941 to 1965. The park's lake was created in 1941 when the CCC and WPA constructed the 400-foot (122 m) Little Beaver Dam on Little Beaver Creek.
Lost River	Category:Lost River State Park on Wikimedia Commons	Hardy; 38°55′22″N 78°53′22″W	3,712 acres (1,502 ha)	1934	Howards Lick Run	Henry Lee III received this land in 1796 for his American Revolutionary War service. His son Charles Carter Lee founded Hardy White Sulphur Springs resort here in 1852. Later renamed Lee White Sulphur Springs, it burned down in 1910. The state acquired the land in 1934, and the NPS and CCC developed the park and its recreational facilities. The park's 142 CCC resources and its Lighthorse Harry Lee Cabin (c. 1800) are listed on the NRHP.
Moncove Lake	Category:Moncove Lake State Park on Wikimedia Commons	Monroe; 37°37′19″N 80°21′04″W	896 acres (363 ha)	1991	Devil Creek; Moncove Lake	The park's 144-acre (58 ha) Moncove Lake was created in 1960 by the 1959 impoundment of Devil Creek. Formerly a wildlife management area, the park is located under an autumn flyway for migrating raptors, including broad-winged hawks (Buteo platypterus).
North Bend	Category:North Bend State Park on Wikimedia Commons	Ritchie; 39°13′23″N 81°06′37″W	2,492 acres (1,009 ha)	1951	North Bend Lake; North Fork Hughes River	Named through a contest sponsored by the Ritchie Gazette in the 1950s, the park features the "Extra Mile Trail" for the disabled and hosts the annual International Sports Jamboree for physically or visually challenged athletes. The park's 305-acre (123 ha) North Bend Lake was created by an impoundment on the North Fork Hughes River in 2002.
North Bend Rail Trail	Category:North Bend Rail Trail State Park on Wikimedia Commons	Doddridge, Harrison, Ritchie, and Wood; 39°17′06″N 80°58′14″W	Not applicable	1991	Goose Creek; Hushers Run; Little Kanawha River; Middle Island Creek; North Fork Hughes River; Walker Creek	Consists of a 72-mile (116 km) section of an abandoned spur of the CSX Transportation system between Parkersburg and Wolf Summit. Passes through 13 tunnels and over 36 bridges, and is part of the 5,500-mile (8,851 km) American Discovery Trail. The longest tunnel is the 2,207-foot (673 m) Tunnel No. 6 between West Union and Central Station.
Pinnacle Rock	Category:Pinnacle Rock State Park on Wikimedia Commons	Mercer; 37°18′43″N 81°17′32″W	374 acres (151 ha)	1938	Jimmy Lewis Lake; Lick Branch	Named for the 3,100-foot (945 m) tall Pinnacle Rock sandstone formation. Its rustic park facilities were built by the CCC in 1938 and the 15-acre (6 ha) Jimmy Lewis Lake was built between 1965 and 1968.
Pipestem Resort	Category:Pipestem Resort State Park on Wikimedia Commons	Mercer and Summers; 37°32′23″N 80°59′39″W	4,050 acres (1,640 ha)	1963	Bluestone River; Long Branch Creek; Long Branch Lake; Mountain Creek	Named for the pipestem bush (Spiraea alba). Considered the "crown jewel" of the state park system upon its completion in 1971, it is one of three state parks, along with Twin Falls Resort and Canaan Valley Resort, to receive funding from the EDA. The park has a seasonal aerial tramway between the rim and floor of Bluestone Canyon, which features a vertical drop of approximately 1,200 feet (366 m).
Prickett's Fort	Category:Prickett's Fort State Park on Wikimedia Commons	Marion; 39°31′01″N 80°05′40″W	188 acres (76 ha)	1975	Monongahela River; Pricketts Creek	Features a reconstruction of Prickett's Fort, an 18th-century fortification built to defend settlers against Native American attacks. Includes the Prickett cemetery (1772), the area's oldest burial ground. The park's Prickett's Fort and Jacob Prickett Jr. Log House are listed on the NRHP.
Stonewall Jackson Lake	Category:Stonewall Jackson Lake State Park on Wikimedia Commons	Lewis; 38°56′57″N 80°29′44″W	1,736 acres (703 ha)	1990	Stonewall Jackson Lake; West Fork River	Located along the 2,650-acre (1,072 ha) USACE Stonewall Jackson Lake, the park was developed, constructed, financed, and operated through a public–private partnership between McCabe-Henley LP and WVDNR.
Summersville Lake	—	Nicholas; 38°14′44″N 80°51′21″W	177 acres (72 ha)	2023	Summersville Lake	The state's newest state park, located on the northern shore of the state's largest lake. It is also West Virginia's first state park with climbing access and the nation's first state park with an emphasis on climbing education.
Tomlinson Run	Category:Tomlinson Run State Park on Wikimedia Commons	Hancock; 40°32′49″N 80°35′32″W	1,396 acres (565 ha)	1935	Tomlinson Run; Tomlinson Run Lake	Developed by the West Virginia Conservation Commission with support from the NPS, the park features the 30-acre (12 ha) Tomlinson Run Lake, completed by the WPA in 1942.
Tu-Endie-Wei	Category:Tu-Endie-Wei State Park on Wikimedia Commons	Mason; 38°50′21″N 82°08′28″W	4 acres (2 ha)	1956	Kanawha River; Ohio River	Located at the confluence of the Ohio and Kanawha rivers. Site of the only major action during Lord Dunmore's War, the Battle of Point Pleasant. Acquired by the state in 1901. The granite obelisk monument commemorating the battle was dedicated in 1909, and they were added to the state park system in 1956. The park features the Mansion House Museum (c. 1796) and a monument to Cornstalk who is buried there. The park is listed on the NRHP.
Twin Falls Resort	Category:Twin Falls Resort State Park on Wikimedia Commons	Wyoming; 37°38′00″N 81°26′12″W	3,776 acres (1,528 ha)	1964	Black Fork; Marsh Fork	Named for two waterfalls about zero point five miles (0.80 km) apart: one on the Marsh Fork and one on the Black Fork of Cabin Creek. One of three resort state parks funded by the EDA along with Canaan Valley Resort and Pipestem Resort. Contains a golf course, a reconstructed pioneer homestead serving as a living museum, and a lodge designed by TAC. Its diverse species of flora reflect an overlap of northern and southern ecosystems.
Tygart Lake	Category:Tygart Lake State Park on Wikimedia Commons	Barbour and Taylor; 39°16′24″N 80°00′26″W	2,134 acres (864 ha)	1945	Tygart Lake; Tygart Valley River	Contains the 1,750-acre (708 ha) USACE Tygart Lake, created as a result of the Public Works Administration's Tygart Dam in 1938. The dam, designed by Charles M. Wellons and Paul Philippe Cret, is listed on the NRHP.
Valley Falls	Category:Valley Falls State Park on Wikimedia Commons	Marion and Taylor; 39°23′25″N 80°05′14″W	1,145 acres (463 ha)	1964	Tygart Valley River	Named for two fast-moving waterfalls of 12 feet (4 m) and 18 feet (5 m) in height on the Tygart Valley River. During the 19th century, a milling and industrial town flourished at this site.
Watoga	Category:Watoga State Park on Wikimedia Commons	Pocahontas; 38°06′13″N 80°09′00″W	10,100 acres (4,087 ha)	1934	Greenbrier River; Island Lick Run; Watoga Lake	Initially developed as a state forest in 1926. One of West Virginia's first CCC camps was established here in 1933. The largest of West Virginia's state parks, it contains the 11-acre (4 ha) Watoga Lake. A historic district containing the park's 103 CCC resources is listed on the NRHP.
Watters Smith Memorial	Category:Watters Smith Memorial State Park on Wikimedia Commons	Harrison; 39°10′10″N 80°24′40″W	532 acres (215 ha)	1949	Duck Creek	Consists of the pioneer homestead of Watters Smith who moved here with his wife Elizabeth in 1796. A log cabin similar to the original was reconstructed at the park along with period farm buildings. The Smith family home (c. 1876) has also been restored as a museum. The park is listed on the NRHP.

== Former state parks ==
Former West Virginia state parks map with 7 clickable links

Former West Virginia state parks
Park name	Image	County and location	Area in acres (ha)	Date of establishment	Date of disestablishment	Streams and/or lakes	Remarks
Booker T. Washington	Category:Booker T. Washington State Park (West Virginia) on Wikimedia Commons	Kanawha; 38°22′55″N 81°44′53″W	7.43 acres (3 ha)	1949	By 1959 (Note: Booker T. Washington State Park was not listed among a list of West Virginia state parks in the 1959 West Virginia Blue Book and in the 1960 NPS tabulation of U.S. state parks. The 1958 West Virginia Blue Book did not include a listing of West Virginia state parks.)	Near Finney Branch	It was the only state park that allowed admission to African Americans until the park system were integrated in 1954. The park consisted of day-use picnicking facilities, but lacked a pool, hiking trails, campsites, and other amenities. Prior to the park's opening in 1949, African Americans were denied access to the state park system and were limited to the African American 4-H Camp at Camp Washington-Carver which was funded by the West Virginia State College extension service.
Grandview	Category:Grandview State Park on Wikimedia Commons	Raleigh; 37°50′29″N 81°03′56″W	877 acres (355 ha)	1939	1990	New River	Initially constructed by the CCC, the park was named for its views of New River Gorge and the river's Horseshoe Bend. It was transferred to the NPS in 1990, and is managed as part of the New River Gorge National River. Grandview remains the home of Theatre West Virginia, which performs Hatfields and McCoys and Kermit Hunter's Honey in the Rock at Cliffside Amphitheater. In 2021, the New River Gorge National River was redesignated as the New River Gorge National Park and Preserve.
Grave Creek Mound	Category:Grave Creek Mound on Wikimedia Commons	Marshall; 39°55′01″N 80°44′40″W	7 acres (2.83 ha)	1970	1996	None	The Grave Creek Mound measures 69 feet (21 m) tall and 295 feet (90 m) in diameter. Built c. 250–150 BCE, it is the largest Adena culture mound. It was purchased by the state in 1909 and maintained by the West Virginia State Penitentiary warden until 1970, when it became a state park. It was declared a National Historic Landmark in 1966. In 1996, the mound was transferred to the West Virginia Division of Culture and History, which maintains the mound and the Delf Norona Museum as the Grave Creek Mound Archaeological Complex.
James Rumsey Monument	Category:James Rumsey Monument on Wikimedia Commons	Jefferson; 39°25′58.20″N 77°47′56.81″W	4.09 acres (1.66 ha)	1956	1978	Potomac River	The state park system operated the monument from 1956 until 1978, when operation of the monument was returned to the society and the adjoining park transferred to the Corporation of Shepherdstown. The monument provides a panoramic view of the Potomac River valley and is a contributing property to the NRHP Shepherdstown Historic District.
Mingo Oak	Category:Mingo Oak on Wikimedia Commons	Mingo; 37°47′37″N 82°06′46″W	1.5 acres (0.61 ha)	1931	1938	Near Trace Fork	The park was leased to the state of West Virginia for the maintenance and conservation of the Mingo Oak, the oldest and largest living white oak (Quercus alba), until its felling in 1938.
Mont Chateau	Category:Mont Chateau State Park on Wikimedia Commons	Monongalia; 39°39′33″N 79°50′52″W	42.16 acres (17.1 ha)	1955	1977	Cheat Lake	Located along Cheat Lake, the park and its 54-room lodge (1958) failed to develop as a tourist attraction. The lodge and 13 acres (5 ha) were leased to the West Virginia Geological and Economic Survey in 1977. The remainder of the park went to a private owner in 1985 as part of a land swap for an added tract to Holly River State Park.
Morgan Morgan Monument	Category:Morgan Morgan Monument on Wikimedia Commons	Berkeley; 39°20′07″N 78°03′11″W	1.05 acres (0.42 ha)	1956	1970	Mill Creek	Erected in 1924, the monument honors Morgan Morgan who is credited as the first permanent European settler in present-day West Virginia. Morgan settled in the Bunker Hill area around 1731 and is interred in a nearby cemetery. The monument and its roadside park were added to the park system in 1956 and transferred to the West Virginia Road Commission (present-day West Virginia Division of Highways) in 1970. The park is a contributing property of the NRHP Mill Creek Historic District.

== See also ==
- List of West Virginia state forests
- List of West Virginia wildlife management areas
- West Virginia Division of Natural Resources
- West Virginia State Wildlife Center

== Bibliography ==
- Chambers, S. Allen (2004). Buildings of West Virginia. Oxford, New York City: Oxford University Press. ISBN 978-0-19-516548-7. OCLC 53315276.
- National Park Service (1964). Parks for America: A Survey of Park and Related Resources in Fifty States, and a Preliminary Plan. Washington, D.C.: United States Department of the Interior National Park Service. OCLC 475840999 – via Internet Archive.
- National Park Service (1960). State Parks: Areas, Acreages and Accommodations. Washington, D.C.: United States Department of the Interior National Park Service. OCLC 5217001 – via Internet Archive.
- National Park Service Division of Cooperative Activities (1955). State Parks: Areas, Acreages and Accommodations. Washington, D.C.: United States Department of the Interior National Park Service Division of Cooperative Activities. OCLC 12371526 – via Internet Archive.
- National Park Service Division of Recreation Planning (1950). State Parks: Areas, Acreages and Accommodations. Washington, D.C.: United States Department of the Interior National Park Service Division of Recreation Planning. OCLC 966910016 – via Internet Archive.
- O'Brien, William E. (2016). Landscapes of Exclusion: State Parks and Jim Crow in the American South. Amherst, Massachusetts: University of Massachusetts Press. ISBN 978-1-61376-360-5. OCLC 973123431 – via Internet Archive.
- West Virginia Division of Natural Resources (2016). West Virginia Division of Natural Resources Annual Report 2015–2016 (PDF). Charleston, West Virginia: Division of Natural Resources and the Department of Commerce Communications. Archived from the original (PDF) on December 2, 2017.
- West Virginia Division of Natural Resources (2024). West Virginia DNR Annual Report 2023–2024 (PDF). South Charleston, West Virginia: West Virginia Division of Natural Resources – via Internet Archive.
- West Virginia Legislature (1954). J. Howard Myers, Clerk of the West Virginia Senate (ed.). "West Virginia Blue Book, 1954". West Virginia Blue Book. Charleston, West Virginia: Jarrett Printing Company. ISSN 0364-7323. OCLC 1251675.
- West Virginia Legislature (1958). J. Howard Myers, Clerk of the West Virginia Senate (ed.). "West Virginia Blue Book, 1958". West Virginia Blue Book. Charleston, West Virginia: Jarrett Printing Company. ISSN 0364-7323. OCLC 1251675.
- West Virginia Legislature (1959). J. Howard Myers, Clerk of the West Virginia Senate (ed.). "West Virginia Blue Book, 1959". West Virginia Blue Book. Charleston, West Virginia: Jarrett Printing Company. ISSN 0364-7323. OCLC 1251675.
- West Virginia Legislature (2012). Darrell E. Holmes, Clerk of the West Virginia Senate (ed.). "West Virginia Blue Book, 2012" (PDF). West Virginia Blue Book. Charleston, West Virginia: Chapman Printing. ISSN 0364-7323. OCLC 1251675. Archived from the original (PDF) on December 1, 2017.
- West Virginia Legislature (2016a). "Section One: Executive". In Clark S. Barnes, Clerk of the West Virginia Senate (ed.). West Virginia Blue Book, 2016 (PDF). Charleston, West Virginia: Chapman Printing. ISSN 0364-7323. OCLC 1251675. Archived from the original (PDF) on December 1, 2017.
- West Virginia Legislature (2016b). "Section Eleven: Departmental, Statistical & General Information". In Clark S. Barnes, Clerk of the West Virginia Senate (ed.). West Virginia Blue Book, 2016 (PDF). Charleston, West Virginia: Chapman Printing. ISSN 0364-7323. OCLC 1251675. Archived from the original (PDF) on December 1, 2017.
- West Virginia Legislature (2018a). "Section One: Executive". In Lee Cassis, Clerk of the West Virginia Senate (ed.). West Virginia Blue Book, 2017-2018 (PDF). Charleston, West Virginia: Senate Clerk's Office. ISSN 0364-7323. OCLC 1251675.
- West Virginia Legislature (2018b). "Section Eleven: Departmental, Statistical & General Information". In Lee Cassis, Clerk of the West Virginia Senate (ed.). West Virginia Blue Book, 2017-2018 (PDF). Charleston, West Virginia: Senate Clerk's Office. ISSN 0364-7323. OCLC 1251675.
- West Virginia State Park History Committee (1988). Where People and Nature Meet: A History of the West Virginia State Parks. Charleston, West Virginia: Pictorial Histories Publishing Company. ISBN 978-0-933126-91-6. OCLC 22116273.
