= Pinnacle Rock State Park =

State park in Mercer County, West Virginia

- IUCN category III (natural monument or feature)
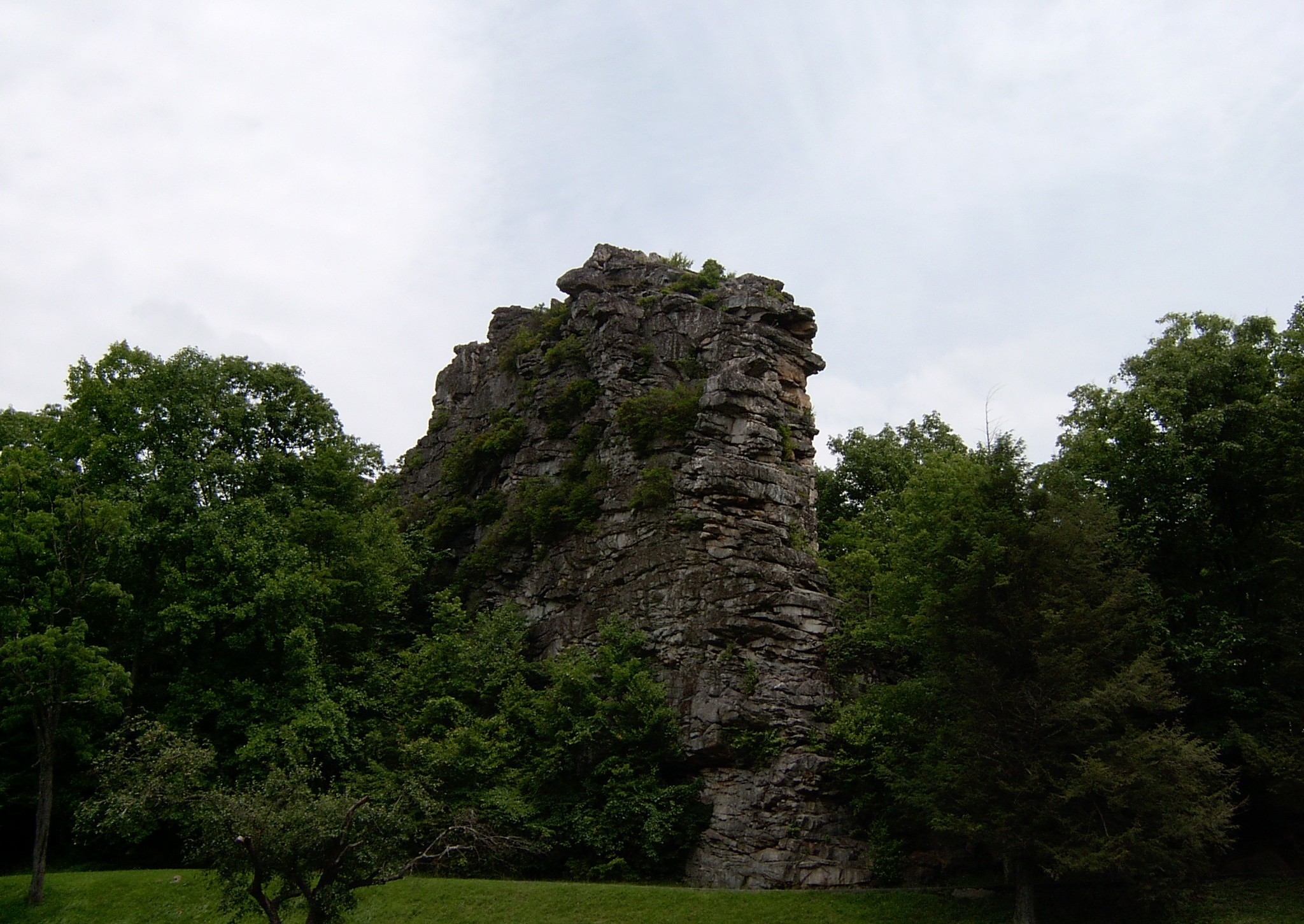
- Pinnacle Rock

- Location within West Virginia
- Location: Mercer, West Virginia, United States
- Coordinates: 37°19′16″N 81°17′32″W
- Area: 374 acres (151 ha)
- Elevation: 2,745 ft (837 m)
- Established: 1938
- Named for: Pinnacle Rock
- Governing body: West Virginia Division of Natural Resources
- Website: wvstateparks.com/park/pinnacle-rock-state-park/

Pinnacle Rock State Park is a 374-acre (151 ha) day use state park in Mercer County, West Virginia. The park surrounds Pinnacle Rock, a sandstone formation that rises above the surrounding terrain.

== Features ==
- Pinnacle Rock
- Jimmy Lewis Lake
- Large stone picnic shelter
- 2-mile (3.2 km) hiking trail
- Picnic area
- Fishing

== Accessibility ==
Accessibility for the disabled was assessed by West Virginia University. The 2005 assessment found the park offices to be accessible.

== See also ==
- List of West Virginia state parks
