= Tu-Endie-Wei State Park =

State park in Mason County, West Virginia

- IUCN category III (natural monument or feature)
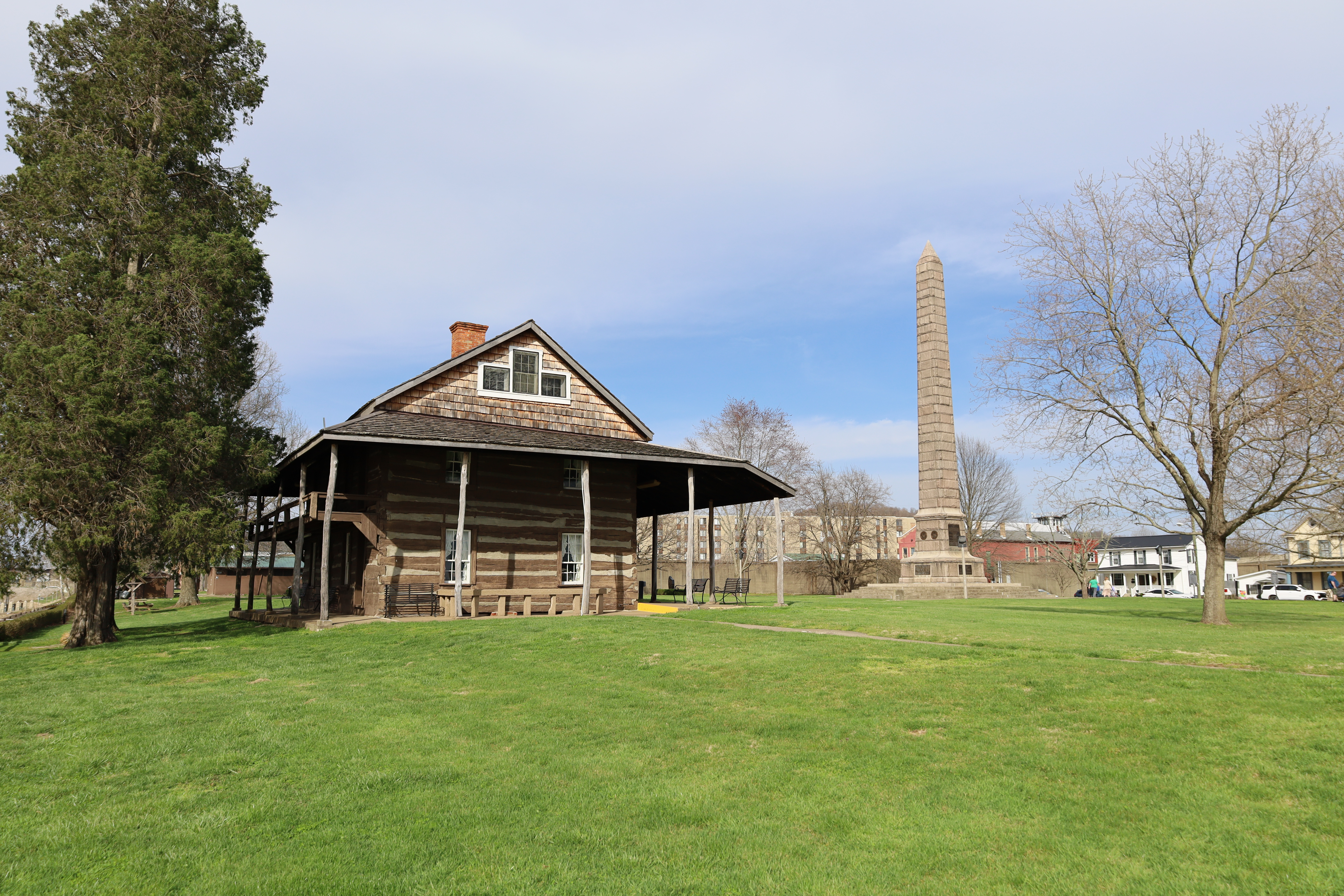
- Tu-Endie-Wei State Park in 2022, showing the Mansion House at left and the monument at right

- Location within West Virginia
- Location: Mason, West Virginia, United States
- Coordinates: 38°50′21″N 82°08′27″W
- Area: 4 acres (1.6 ha)
- Elevation: 541 ft (165 m)
- Established: 1901-10-10
- Named for: Tu-Endie-Wei (Wyandot), "Between Two Waters" (English)
- Governing body: West Virginia Division of Natural Resources
- Website: wvstateparks.com/park/tu-endie-wei-state-park/
- Point Pleasant Battleground
- U.S. National Register of Historic Places
- Location: Point Pleasant, West Virginia
- NRHP reference No.: 70000656
- Added to NRHP: January 26, 1970

Tu-Endie-Wei State Park is located at the confluence of the Kanawha River and the Ohio River in downtown Point Pleasant, West Virginia, United States. The park commemorates the Battle of Point Pleasant, fought between the settler militia of Virginia and the forces of Shawnee Chief Cornstalk on October 10, 1774. The militia victory by the settlers weakened the alliance between native forces and the British and freed up settlers from western Virginia to cross the Allegheny Mountains and join in the American Revolutionary War.

The name "Tu-Endie-Wei" refers to the Wyandot Indian phrase meaning "the point between two waters" in English.

The Battle of Point Pleasant has been recognized as the first battle of the American Revolutionary War by the National Society of Daughters of the American Revolution. Female descendants of battle veterans are allowed to join the D.A.R. The historical debate about the first battle claim may not yet be resolved.

The 1796 Mansion House is historic house museum originally used as a tavern. The Colonel Charles Lewis Chapter, N.S. Daughters of the American Revolution operates the Mansion House Museum on a seasonal basis.

== See also ==
- List of West Virginia state parks
