= Fox Forest Wildlife Management Area =

State Wildlife Management Area in Randolph County, West Virginia

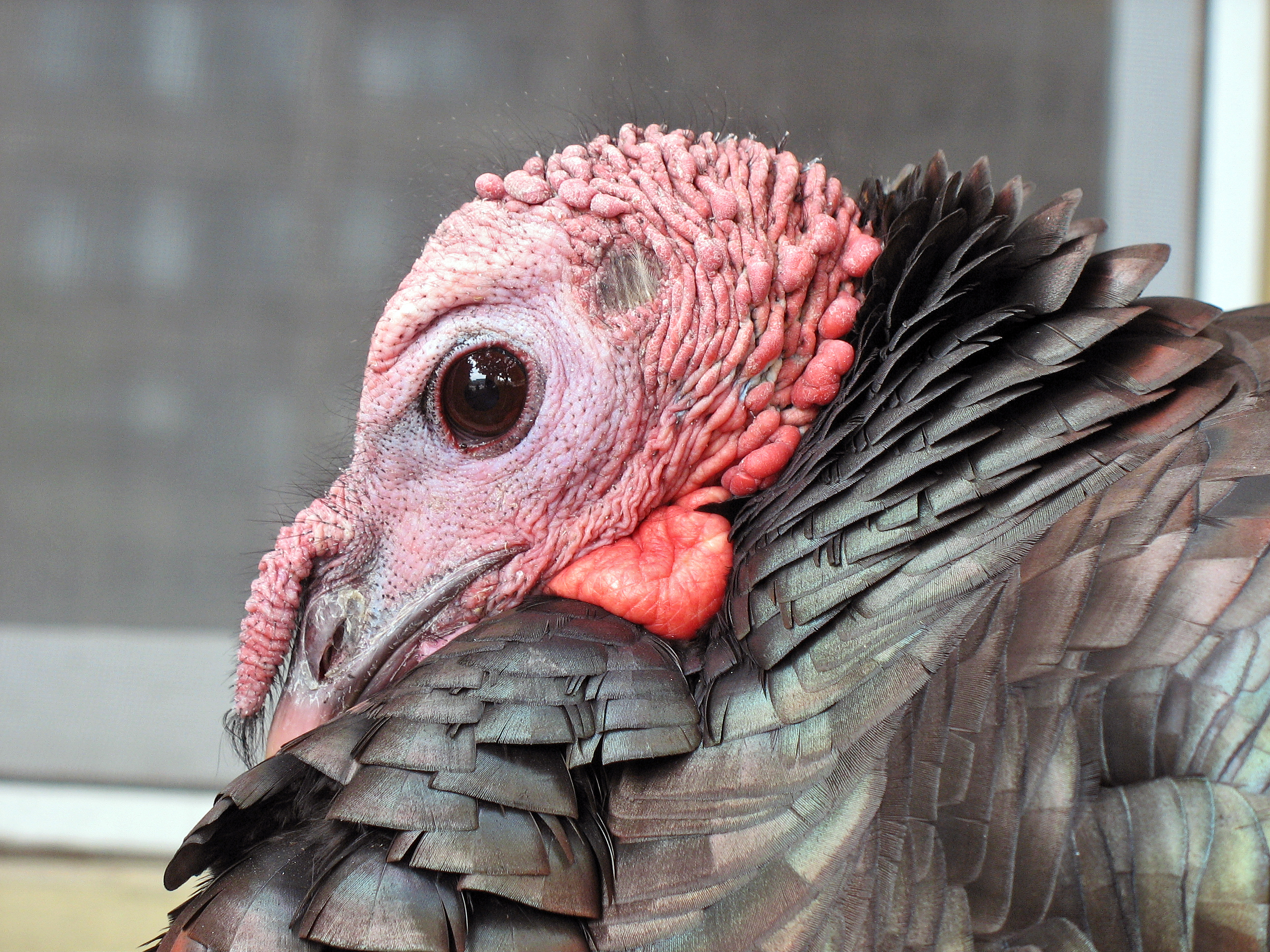
- Wild turkey (Meleagris gallopavo) may be found at the Fox Forest WMA

- Location within West Virginia
- Location: Randolph, West Virginia, United States
- Coordinates: 38°54′26″N 79°51′38″W
- Elevation: 2,024 ft (617 m)
- Operator: Wildlife Resources Section, WV Division of Natural Resources

Fox Forest Wildlife Management Area (WMA) is located south of Elkins, West Virginia in Randolph County. It is located along the Tygart Valley River and is adjacent to the West Virginia Division of Natural Resources' Elkins Operations Center.

== See also ==
- Animal conservation
- Hunting
- fishing
- List of West Virginia wildlife management areas
