= Summersville Lake State Park =

State park in Nicholas County, West Virginia

- Location within West Virginia
- Location: Nicholas, West Virginia, United States
- Nearest city: Summersville, West Virginia
- Coordinates: 38°14′44″N 80°51′21″W
- Area: 177 acres (72 ha)
- Elevation: 1,779.5 ft (542.4 m)
- Designated: August 11, 2023
- Named for: Summersville Lake
- Governing body: West Virginia Division of Natural Resources
- Website: wvstateparks.com/summersville/

Summersville Lake State Park is a state park located on the northern shore of Summersville Lake, a reservoir on the Gauley River in the U.S. state of West Virginia.

== Geography and setting ==
Summersville Lake State Park spans 177 acres (72 ha) of forested hills along the northern shore of Summersville Lake, a reservoir on the Gauley River. As the largest lake in West Virginia, Summersville Lake covers 2,790 acres (1,130 ha) with over 60 miles (97 km) of shoreline at the summer pool water level.

The park is situated near the eastern edge of U.S. Route 19 (US 19) and West Virginia Route 41 (WV 41), about 2.5 miles (4.0 km) south of Summersville. Salmon Run, a nearby stream, flows parallel to US 19 and WV 41 and it joins Summersville Lake just west of Hughes Bridge, which carries US 19 and WV 41 over the lake. Although the park borders the cliffs overlooking the lake, it does not directly adjoin the shoreline, which is managed by the United States Army Corps of Engineers (USACE).

== Background ==
=== Summersville Lake and Dam ===
The USACE constructed Summersville Lake between 1960 and 1966 to control flooding in an 803-square-mile (2,080 km^{2}) area of the Gauley and Kanawha rivers' watershed. President Lyndon B. Johnson dedicated the Summersville Lake and Dam on September 3, 1966.

== Park establishment and operation ==
In 2023, West Virginia Governor Jim Justice sent a bill to the West Virginia Legislature officially designating land along the northern shore of Summersville Lake as Summersville Lake State Park. Governor Justice announced the bill and the plans to create the state park on August 6, 2023. The West Virginia Legislature passed House Bill 214, and Governor Justice signed the bill to officially designate Summersville Lake State Park at the park site on August 11, 2023.

== See also ==
- List of West Virginia state parks
- Summersville Lake
