= Little Beaver State Park =

State Park in Raleigh County, West Virginia

- IUCN category III (natural monument or feature)
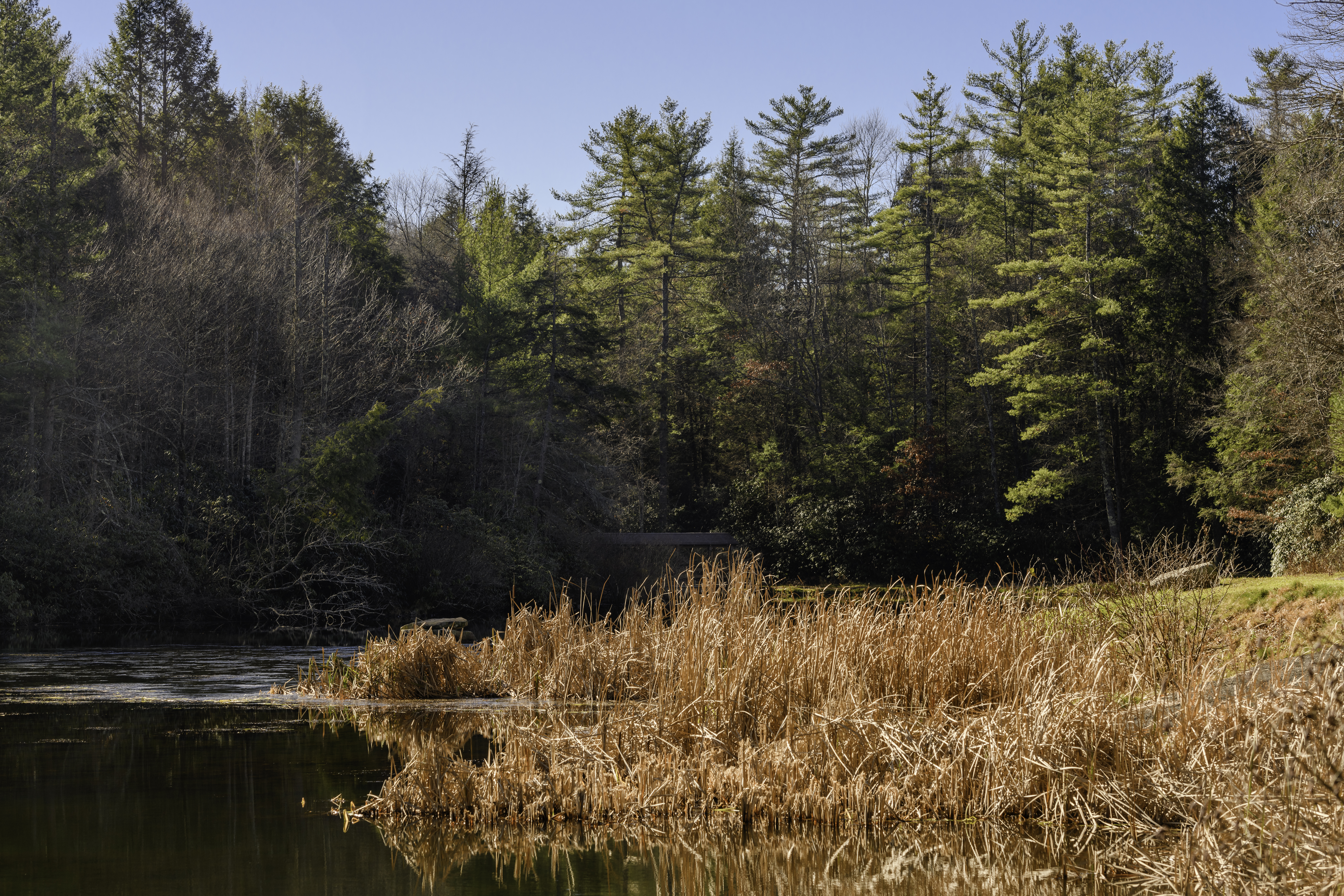
- Little Beaver Lake

- Location within West Virginia
- Location: Raleigh, West Virginia, United States
- Coordinates: 37°45′21″N 81°04′50″W
- Area: 562 acres (227 ha)
- Elevation: 2,450 ft (750 m)
- Established: 1970
- Website: wvstateparks.com/park/little-beaver-state-park/

Little Beaver State Park is state park in Raleigh County, West Virginia. It is located near Beckley, West Virginia, about 2 miles (3.2 km) south of I-64 at Grandview Road, exit 129A. The park sits on the shores of 18-acre (0.07 km^{2}) Little Beaver Lake.

== Features ==
- Picnic area
- Playground
- Hiking trails
- Mountain biking trails
- Fishing in Little Beaver Lake
- Boat rentals at Little Beaver Lake
- 46-site Campground

== Little Beaver Dam ==
- Little Beaver Dam
- U.S. National Register of Historic Places
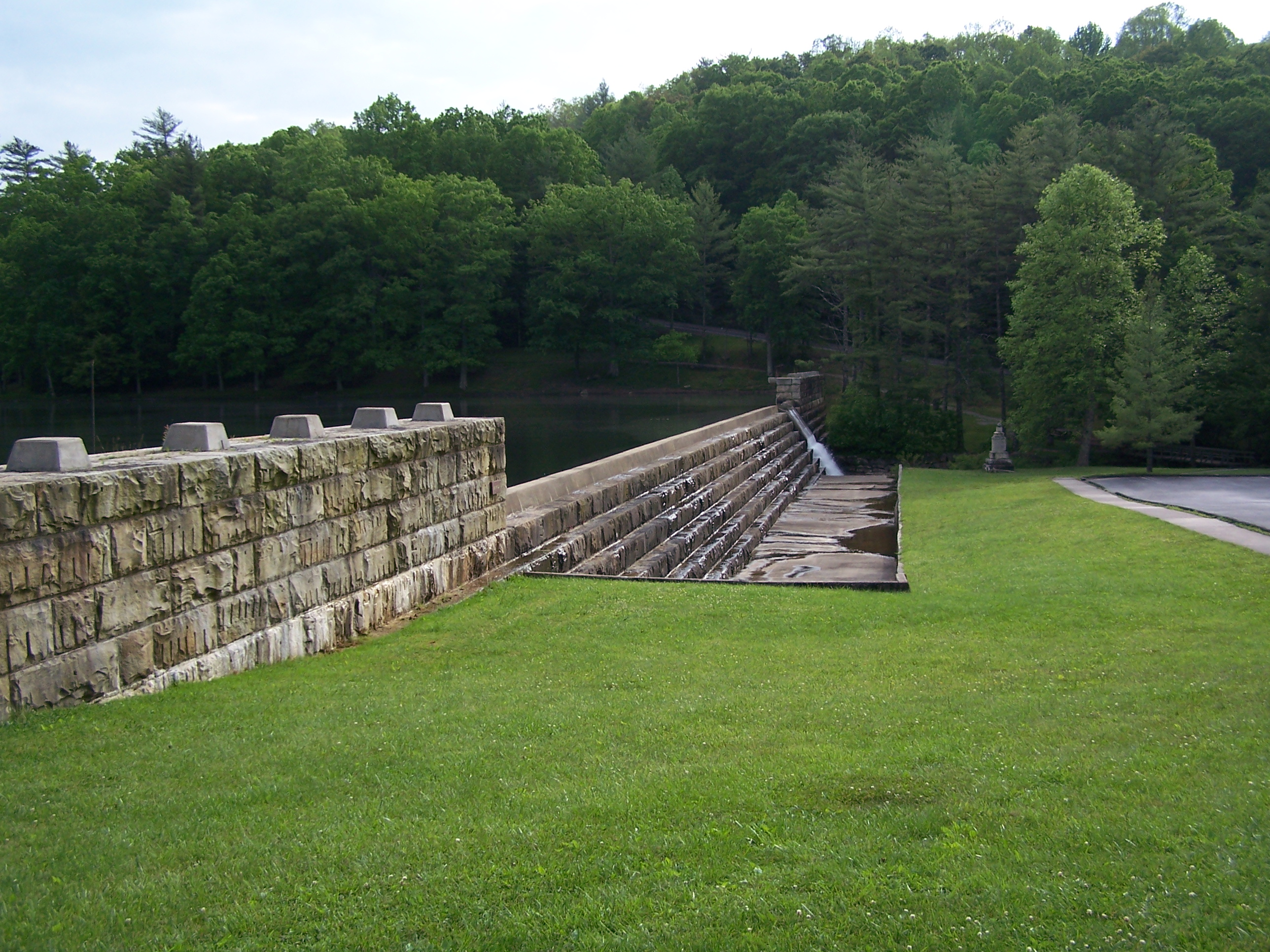
- Little Beaver State Park Dam, June 2005
- Location: Little Beaver State Park off WV 307, near Crow, West Virginia
- Coordinates: 37°45′17″N 81°4′6″W
- Area: less than one acre
- Built: 1942
- Architect: Coda, S.C., WPA; Konrad, John, CCC
- NRHP reference No.: 98000287
- Added to NRHP: April 1, 1998

Little Beaver Dam is a historic dam located in the park, near Crow. It was built between 1938 and 1942, as a federally supported project of the Works Progress Administration and Civilian Conservation Corps. The dam measures 400 feet long and 29 feet high and is faced with rough chiseled sandstone.

It was listed on the National Register of Historic Places in 1998.

== History ==
Originally a day-use facility, Little Beaver received a 46-site campground in 2011. 30 sites, opened on July 1 of that year, have electric and water hookups with an additional 16 water-only sites planned to open later in the year.

== Accessibility ==
Accessibility for the disabled was assessed by West Virginia University. The 2005 assessment found the park to be accessible.

== See also ==
- Little Beaver Dam
- List of West Virginia state parks
