= Beech Fork State Park =

State Park in Cabell and Wayne counties, West Virginia

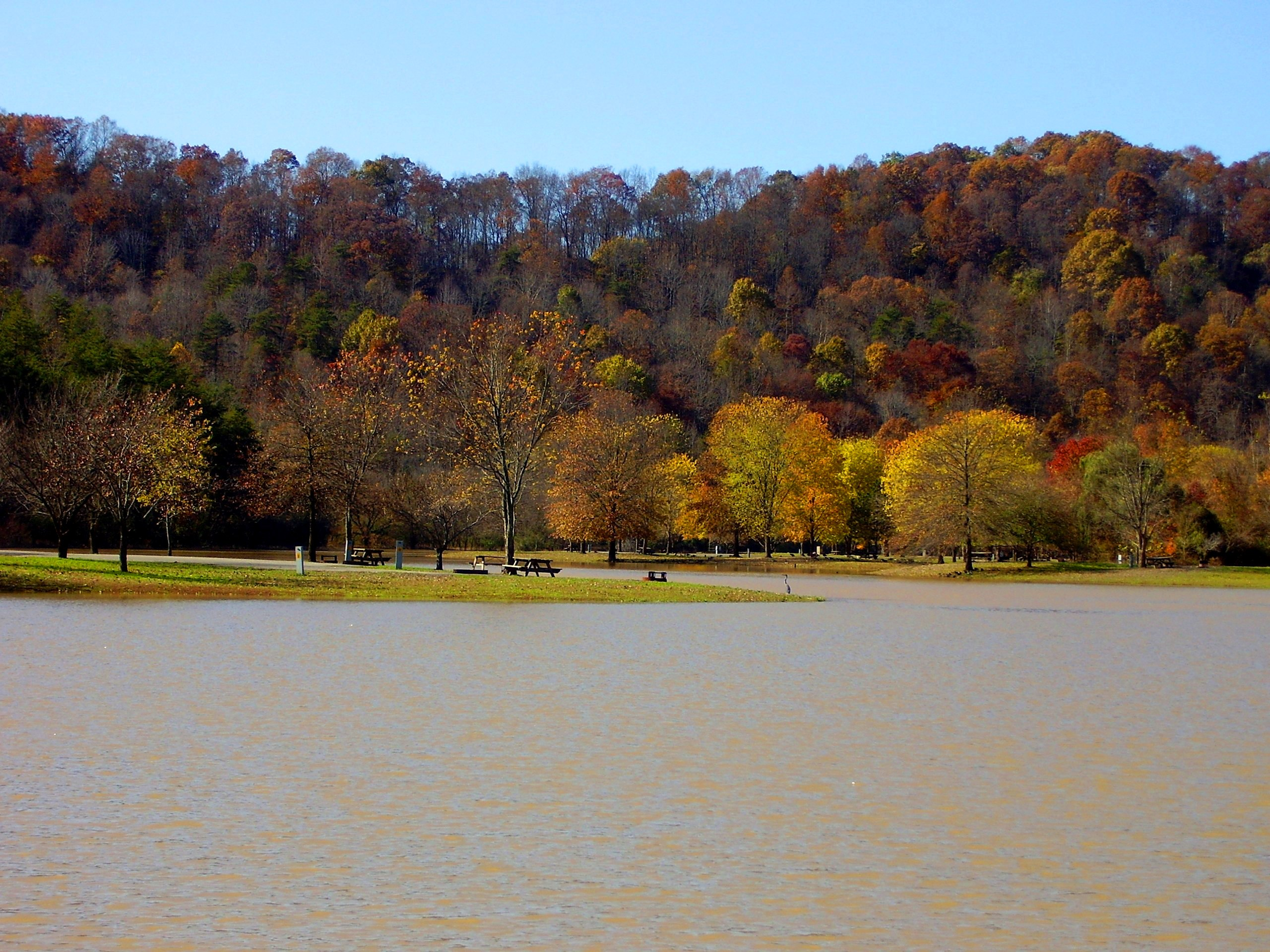
- Beech Fork Lake

- Location within West Virginia
- Location: West Virginia, United States
- Coordinates: 38°18′36″N 82°20′52″W
- Area: 3,860 acres (15.6 km^{2})
- Elevation: 722 ft (220 m)
- Established: January 1, 1978
- Named for: Beech Fork of Twelvepole Creek
- Governing body: West Virginia Division of Natural Resources
- Website: wvstateparks.com/park/beech-fork-state-park/

Beech Fork State Park is a state park located in Cabell County and Wayne County, West Virginia. The park is located on the tailwater shores of Beech Fork Lake, a flood control impoundment of the U.S. Army Corps of Engineers on the Beech Fork of Twelvepole Creek. Since its development in the mid-1970s, Beech Fork State Park has proven to be a popular recreation spot for the residents of nearby Barboursville and Huntington, West Virginia, as well as those living in the surrounding region. The park is located about 10 miles (16 km) south of the Hal Greer Exit (Exit 11) of Interstate 64.

Access to the park is also available from Exits 8, 15, and 20 of I-64. The Beech Fork Lake Dam and Marina are about a 20-mile (40-minute) drive from the park.

Corps of Engineers lake rules restrict boat motors to 10-hp or smaller.

== Features ==
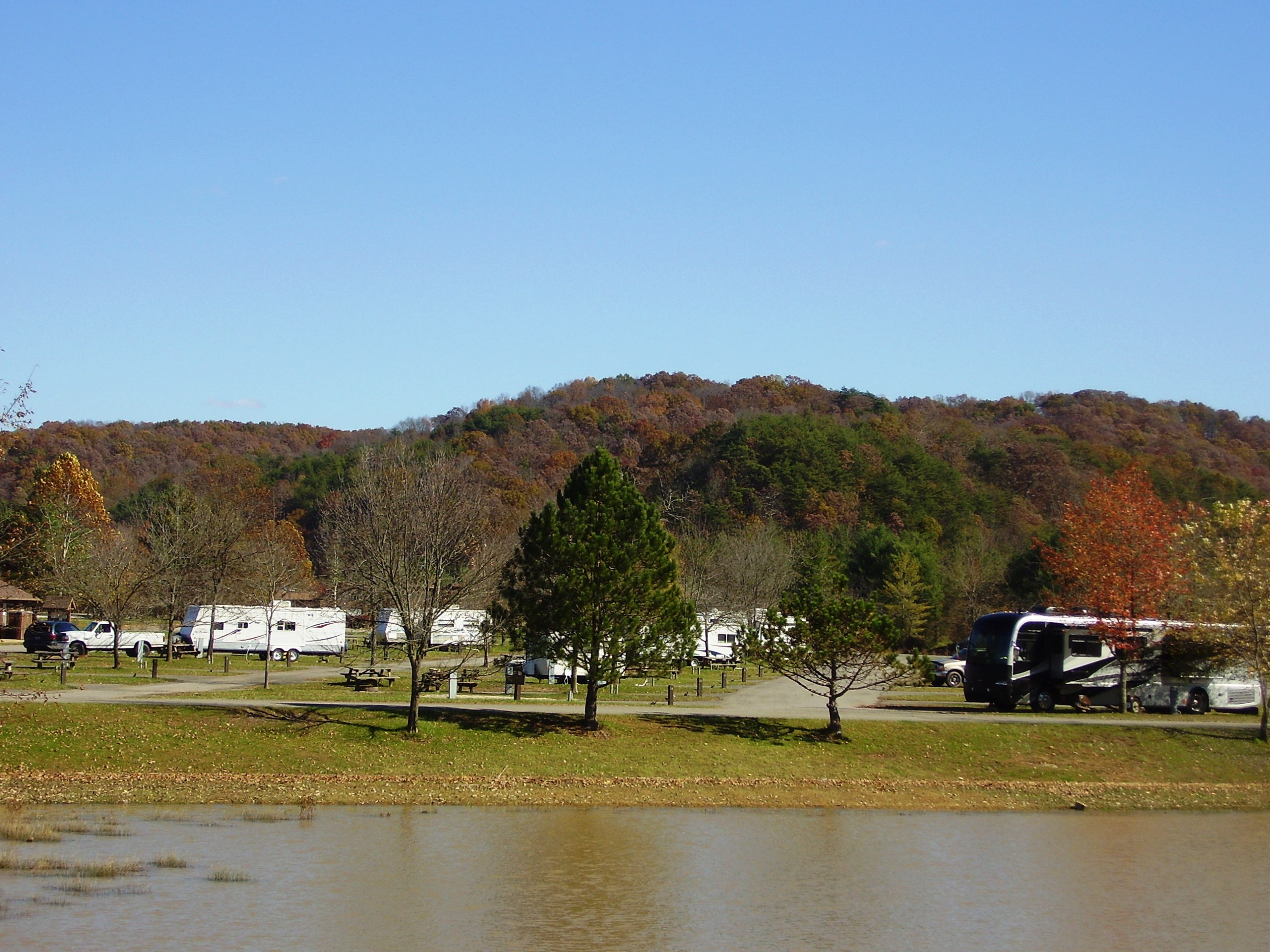
Camping at the lake is a popular recreational activity, even in the Fall

- Boat launch access to Beech Fork Lake
- 4 Campgrounds with 275 campsites total (including 49 with full hookups, 37 primitive and 189 with electrical power)
- 6 cabins
- 50-meter swimming pool
- Hiking trails
- Mountain biking trails
- Fishing access
- Tennis court
- Volleyball court
- Basketball court
- Softball field
- Picnic area
- Dump station
- Water fill station
- Paddle boat and canoe rental ( peak season only )
- 100-yard rifle and pistol range
- Pontoon and fishing boat rentals are available from the privately operated Beech Fork Lake Marina.

== Accessibility ==
Accessibility for the disabled was assessed by West Virginia University. The assessment found the campground, picnic areas, swimming pool, and the doors and ramps of public buildings to be accessible. The 2005 assessment found issues with signage on buildings and parking lots, and with aspects of access to restrooms.

== See also ==
- List of West Virginia state parks
