= Tomlinson Run State Park =

State park in Hancock County, West Virginia

- IUCN category III (natural monument or feature)
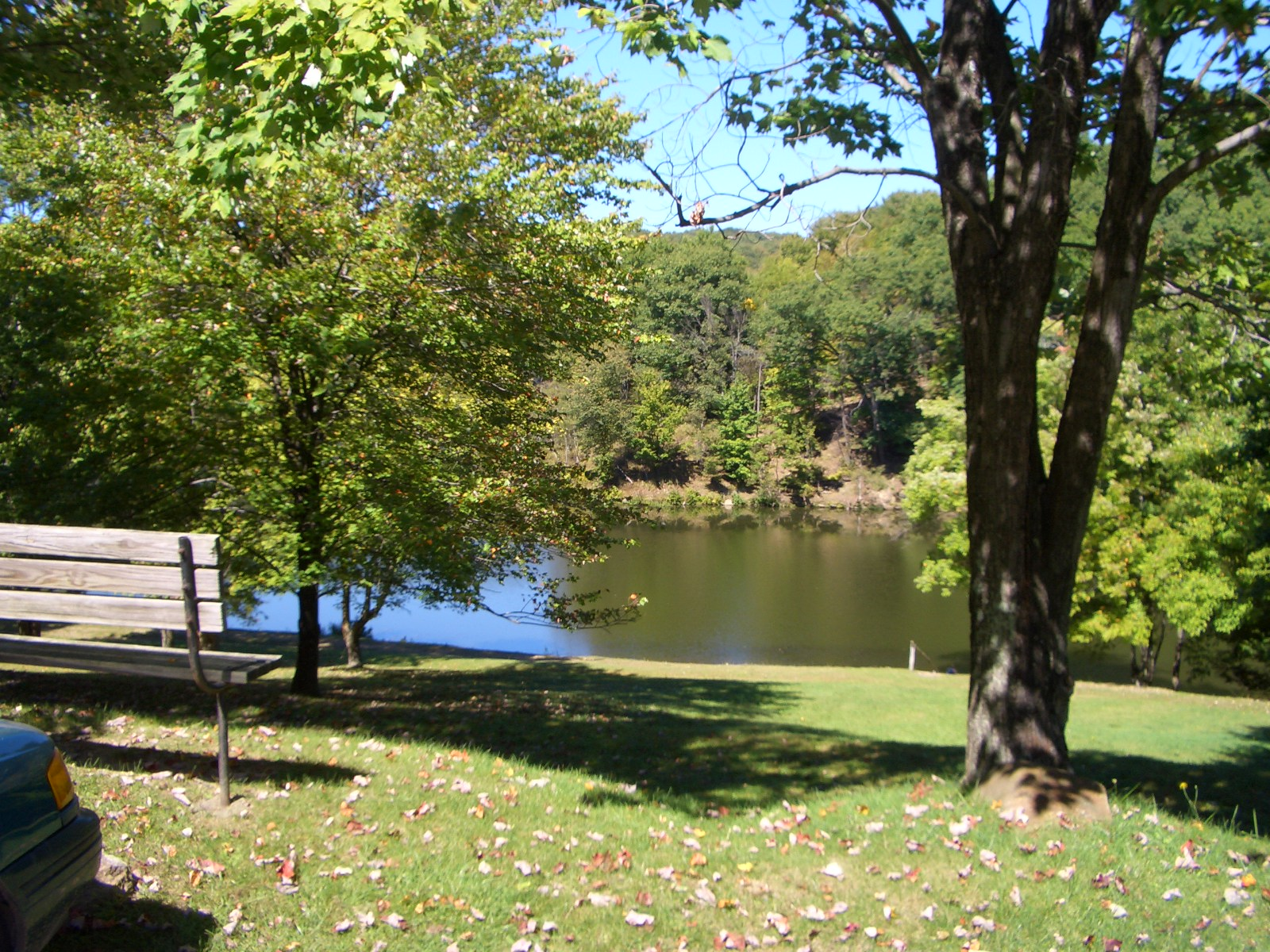
- Tomlinson Run Lake

- Location within West Virginia
- Location: Hancock, West Virginia, United States
- Coordinates: 40°32′51″N 80°35′14″W
- Area: 1,398 acres (5.66 km^{2})
- Elevation: 1,109 ft (338 m)
- Established: 1935
- Named for: Tomlinson Run, tributary of Ohio River
- Governing body: West Virginia Division of Natural Resources
- Website: wvstateparks.com/park/tomlinson-run-state-park/

Tomlinson Run State Park sits on 1,398 acres (5.7 km^{2}) along the small Ohio River tributary of the same name. This state park lies near the foremost tip of the panhandle, in Hancock County. This is the only state park in West Virginia that offers overnight accommodations in a yurt.

The park features a lake and several ponds, totaling 33 acres (13 ha), for fishing and boating.

== Features ==
- 54 camp sites (33 with electrical hookup)
- 2 Campers' Cabins (Sleep 5 and have electricity and lights)
- 4 yurts (2 sleep two persons and 2 sleep 5 persons)
- Group camp (11 cabins can host up to a 112-person group)
- Picnic area with 2 shelters (1 with limited electricity)
- Picnic shelter at miniature golf area with electricity
- Picnic shelter at swimming pool with electricity
- Swimming pool with 182-ft (55 m) water slide
- Miniature golf
- Boat rentals
- Hiking trails
- Basketball and volleyball courts
- Playground

== Accessibility ==
Accessibility for the disabled was assessed by West Virginia University. The assessment found the park to be generally accessible. The 2005 assessment found an issue with accessibility signage.

== Foundation ==
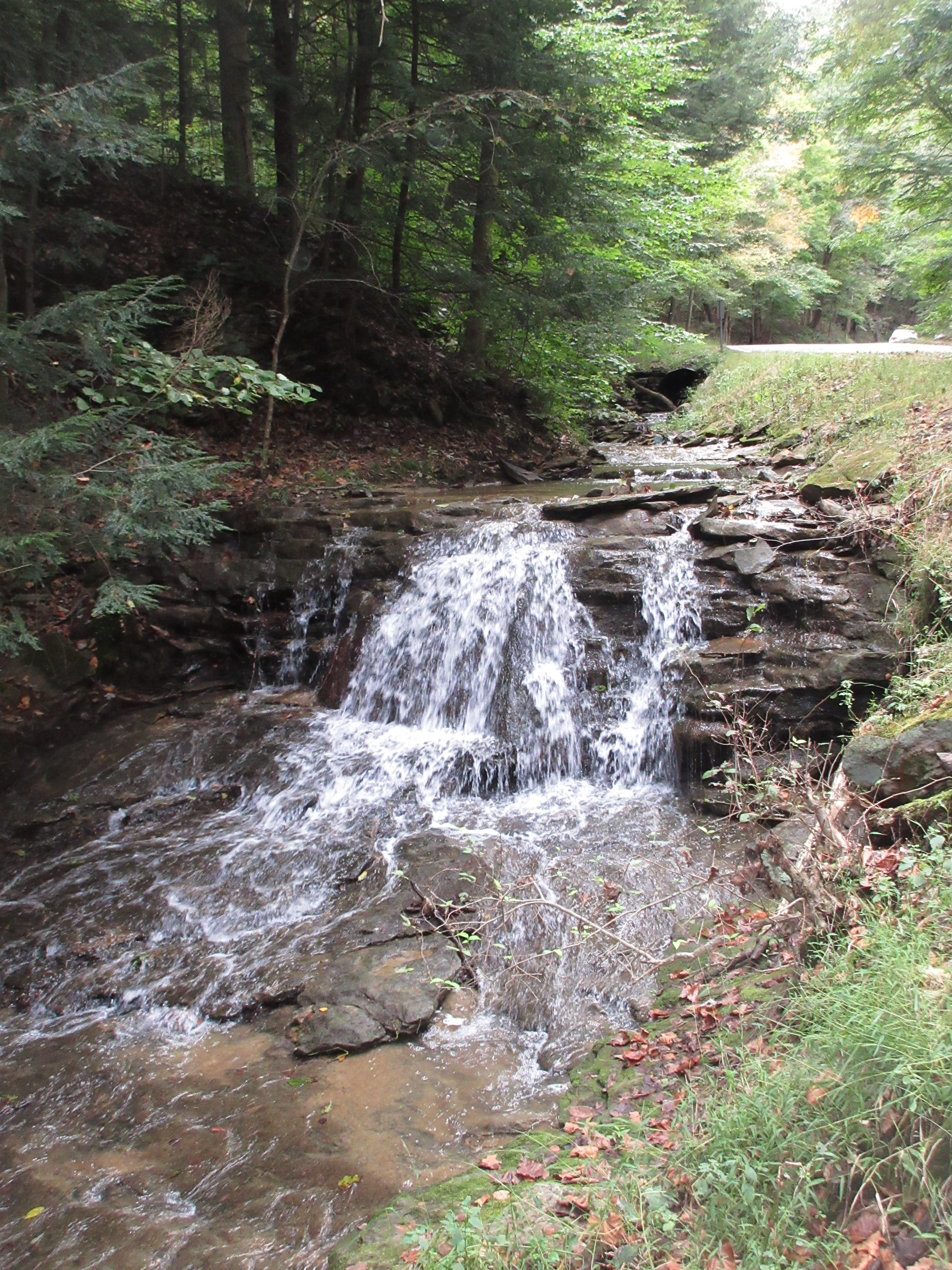
Cascades along the main park road.

The Tomlinson Run State Park Foundation was established in the 1990s by citizens of Hancock County to raise funds for the improvement of the park. Over the years, foundation funding has been used for numerous park improvements including a new maintenance building, playground equipment, picnic shelters, and flag poles.

== See also ==
- List of West Virginia state parks
- State park
