= Babcock State Park =

State Park in Fayette County, West Virginia

- IUCN category III (natural monument or feature)
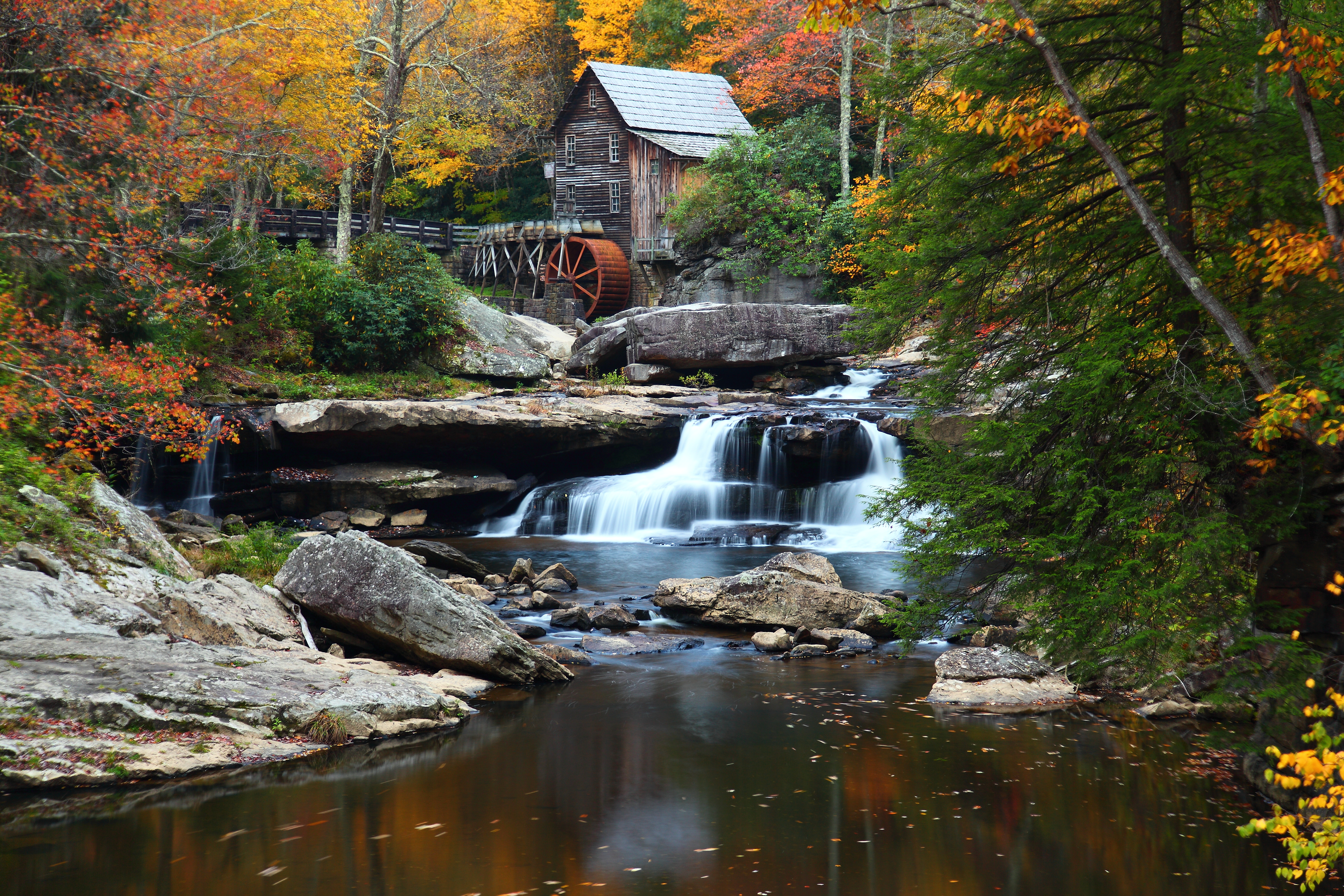
- Glade Creek Grist Mill

- Location within West Virginia
- Location: Fayette, West Virginia, United States
- Coordinates: 37°59′18″N 80°56′38″W
- Area: 4,127 acres (16.70 km^{2})
- Elevation: 2,510 ft (770 m)
- Established: October 11, 1934
- Website: wvstateparks.com/park/babcock-state-park/

Babcock State Park is a state park located along the New River Gorge on 4,127 acres (16.7 km^{2}) wooded in Fayette County, West Virginia. It is located approximately 20 miles away from the New River Gorge Bridge.

Located near the park headquarters, the Glade Creek Grist Mill is commonly photographed. It was named in honor of Edward V. Babcock. Completed in 1976 by combining parts of three other West Virginia grist mills, it is a replica of the original Cooper's Mill that was located nearby. The park's web site describes the Glade Creek Grist Mill as a living, working monument to the more than 500 mills that used to be located throughout the state.

== Features ==
- 28 cabins
- 52 campsites
- gift shop
- More than 20 miles of hiking trails
- outdoor sports facilities (basketball court, tennis court, volleyball court, horseshoe pit)
- 19-acre (77,000 m^{2}) Boley Lake
- rental watercraft (paddleboats, rowboats, canoes)
- swimming pool
- fishing (lake and stream)
- horseback and pony rides (closed)
- naturalist-led hikes and presentations
- picnic shelters
- corn meal and buckwheat flour made at the Glade Creek Grist Mill are available for sale
- scenic overlooks

== Accessibility ==
Accessibility for the disabled was assessed by West Virginia University. The assessment found the campground, picnic shelters, restrooms, and ramps and doorways to public buildings to be accessible. The park also has accessible fishing access and two accessible cabins. During the 2005 assessment some issues were identified concerning parking lot signage and slippery stairways.

== See also ==
- List of West Virginia state parks
