= Dixon Reservoir =

Lake in California, U.S.

- Dixon Lake
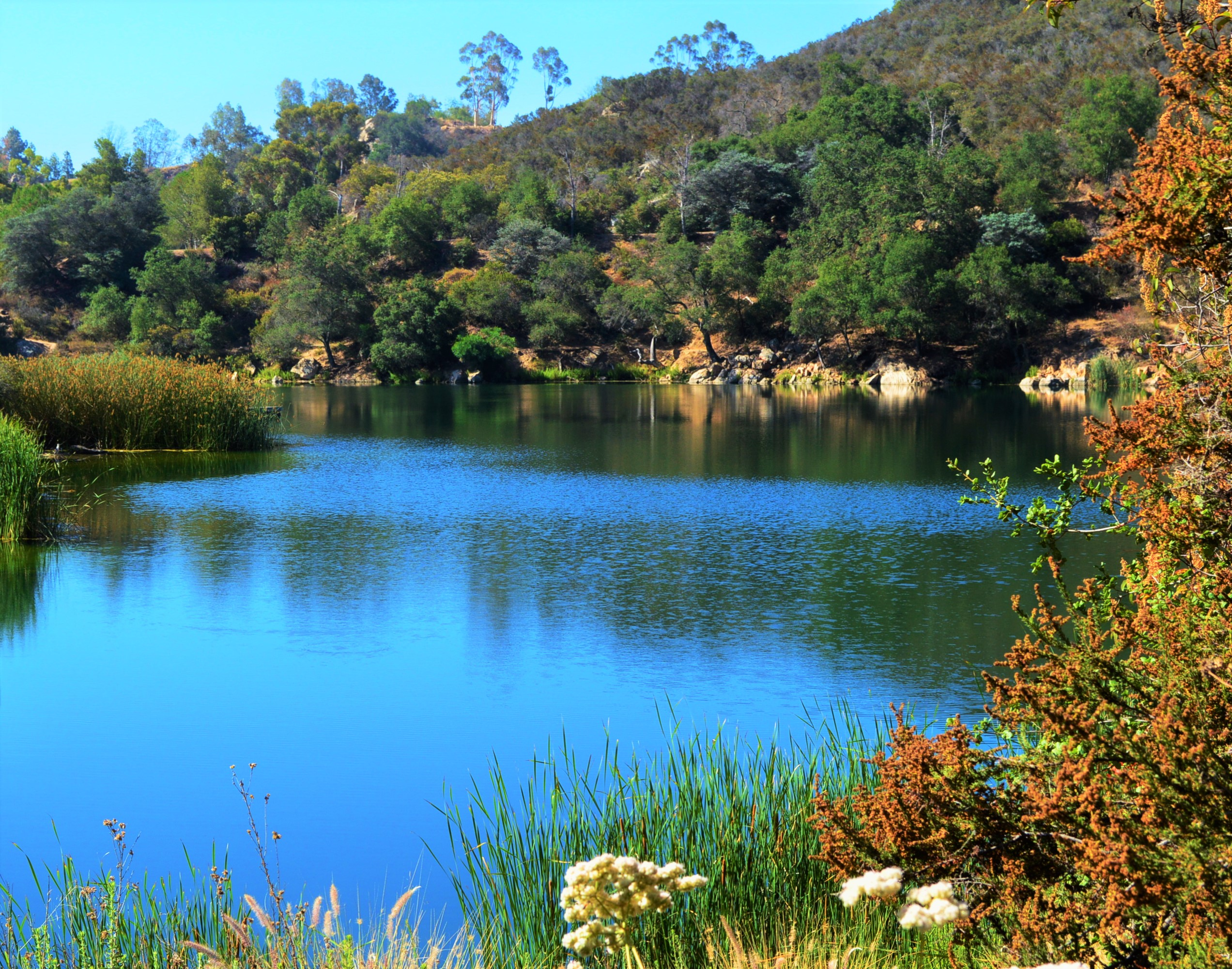

- Location within California
- Location: Escondido, California
- Coordinates: 33.1607751°N 117.0458006°W
- Type: Reservoir
- Basin countries: United States
- Managing agency: City of Escondido
- Built: 1971
- Surface area: 69 acres (28 ha)
- Surface elevation: 1,070 ft (330 m)
- Settlements: Escondido, California
- Website: https://recreation.escondido.org/Facilities/Facility/Details/Dixon-Lake-22

Dixon Reservoir, also known as Dixon Lake, is a small man-made reservoir in Escondido, California. It has been regularly noted to produce the largest kind of largemouth bass in the world.

Dixon Lake is considered a popular place for picnics, camping, and fishing. The California Department of Fish and Wildlife granted the lake an aquaculture permit; fishing licenses are no longer required.

== Description ==
Dixon Reservoir is a small man-made reservoir created by the construction of the Dixon Reservoir Dam. Dixon Reservoir is in the city of Escondido, California, in San Diego County. Its altitude is 1,070 ft (330 m) and it has an area of 69 acres (28 ha). As of September 2020, areas to fish are open to the public, at pre-marked spots. Along with fishing and picnicking, camping has been a popular recreational activity at Dixon Lake with 44 campsites.

== History ==
Dixon Reservoir was constructed in 1971 after a water shortage act was passed a decade before. It was built during the peak of recreational fishing in San Diego. Dixon Reservoir gained popularity during the 2000s after a couple of big bass catches. It has been regularly noted to produce some of the largest kind of largemouth bass in the world. Beginning in 2001, when a 20 lb 12 oz (9.4 kg) largemouth bass was caught. In 2003, the same largemouth bass was caught weighing 21 lb 11 oz (9.8 kg), now nicknamed "Dottie". In 2006, "Dottie" was caught for the third time weighing in at 25 lb (11 kg), although it did not count for any world, state, or lake records as it had been foul hooked. The current record for largest largemouth bass stands at 22 lb 5 oz (10.1 kg).

== Weather ==
Dixon Reservoir has a hot-summer Mediterranean climate, like most of San Diego. In the summer the weather is hot, while in the winter the weather is cool and wet. Because of the Reservoir's inland setting it is considerably warmer than coastal cities. The yearly precipitation averages around 15 in (380 mm) but may vary from year to year. Most precipitation takes place between November through March. The water temperature normally sits around 76 °F (24 °C).

Climate data for Escondido No 2, California (normals 1981–2010)(extremes 1900-2020)
Month	Jan	Feb	Mar	Apr	May	Jun	Jul	Aug	Sep	Oct	Nov	Dec	Year
Record high °F (°C)	92.0 (33.3)	94.0 (34.4)	98.0 (36.7)	103.0 (39.4)	104.0 (40.0)	106.0 (41.1)	112.0 (44.4)	109.0 (42.8)	115.0 (46.1)	106.0 (41.1)	98.0 (36.7)	92.0 (33.3)	115.0 (46.1)
Mean maximum °F (°C)	83.0 (28.3)	84.0 (28.9)	85.0 (29.4)	90.0 (32.2)	92.0 (33.3)	94.0 (34.4)	98.0 (36.7)	99.0 (37.2)	101.0 (38.3)	95.0 (35.0)	87.0 (30.6)	81.0 (27.2)	104.0 (40.0)
Mean daily maximum °F (°C)	68.8 (20.4)	69.1 (20.6)	71.1 (21.7)	74.9 (23.8)	77.8 (25.4)	82.1 (27.8)	87.4 (30.8)	89.0 (31.7)	86.5 (30.3)	80.6 (27.0)	74.2 (23.4)	68.3 (20.2)	77.5 (25.3)
Daily mean °F (°C)	56.0 (13.3)	56.8 (13.8)	59.1 (15.1)	62.7 (17.1)	66.3 (19.1)	70.3 (21.3)	74.9 (23.8)	76.2 (24.6)	74.0 (23.3)	68.0 (20.0)	60.9 (16.1)	55.1 (12.8)	65.0 (18.3)
Mean daily minimum °F (°C)	43.1 (6.2)	44.6 (7.0)	47.2 (8.4)	50.6 (10.3)	54.9 (12.7)	58.5 (14.7)	62.4 (16.9)	63.4 (17.4)	61.5 (16.4)	55.4 (13.0)	47.6 (8.7)	41.9 (5.5)	52.6 (11.4)
Mean minimum °F (°C)	33.0 (0.6)	35.0 (1.7)	38.0 (3.3)	42.0 (5.6)	47.0 (8.3)	51.0 (10.6)	57.0 (13.9)	56.0 (13.3)	53.0 (11.7)	47.0 (8.3)	37.0 (2.8)	32.0 (0.0)	30.0 (−1.1)
Record low °F (°C)	22.0 (−5.6)	26.0 (−3.3)	26.0 (−3.3)	29.0 (−1.7)	33.0 (0.6)	38.0 (3.3)	41.0 (5.0)	36.0 (2.2)	38.0 (3.3)	32.0 (0.0)	26.0 (−3.3)	24.0 (−4.4)	22.0 (−5.6)
Average precipitation inches (mm)	3.03 (77)	3.41 (87)	2.65 (67)	1.15 (29)	0.25 (6.4)	0.12 (3.0)	0.08 (2.0)	0.08 (2.0)	0.21 (5.3)	0.71 (18)	1.17 (30)	2.14 (54)	15 (380.7)
Source: NOAA
