= Pedlar Wildlife Management Area =

State Wildlife Management Area in Monongalia County, West Virginia

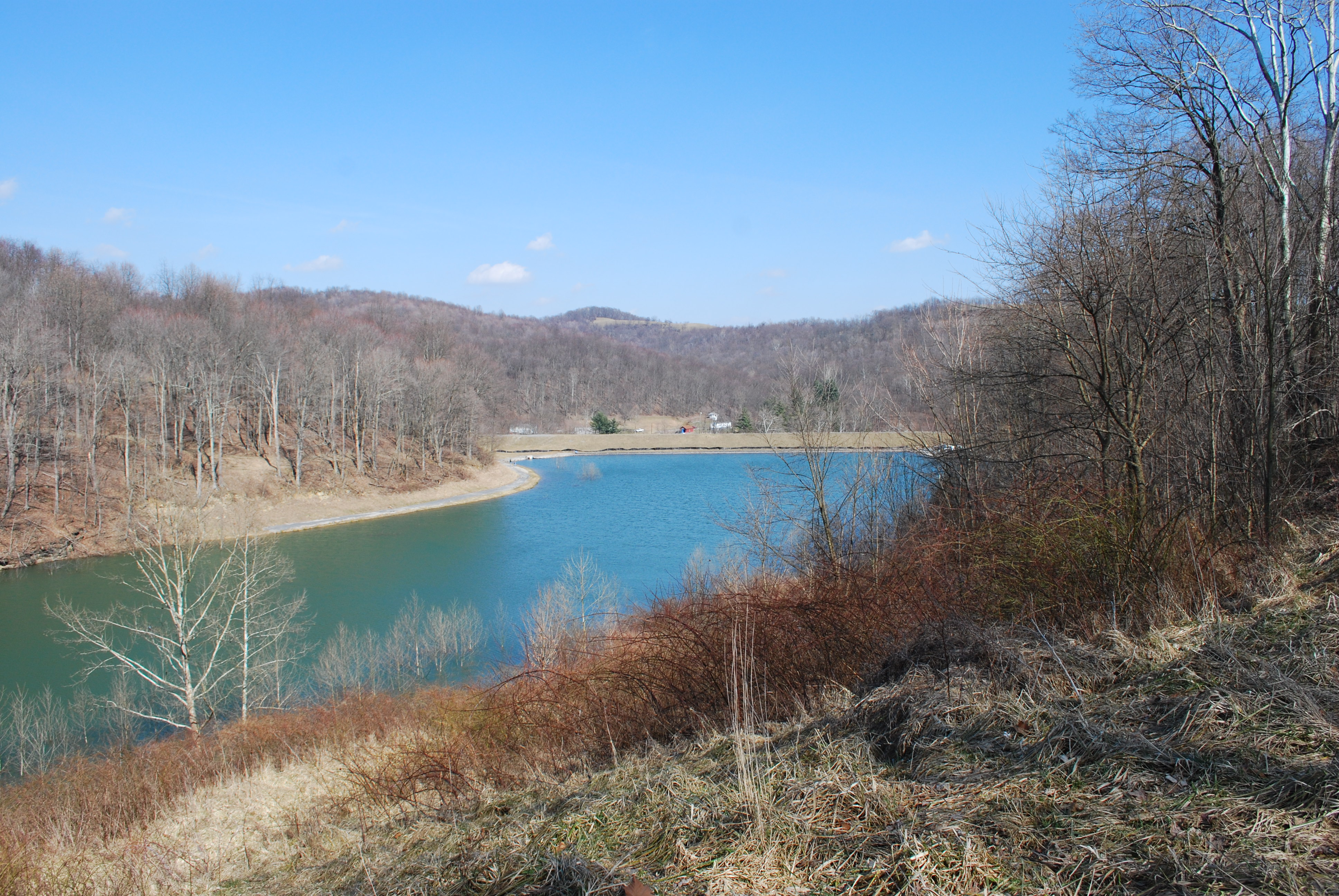
- Mason Lake

- Location within West Virginia
- Location: Monongalia, West Virginia, United States
- Coordinates: 39°41′13″N 80°06′51″W
- Area: 766 acres (310 ha)
- Elevation: 1,024 ft (312 m)
- Established: 2004
- Website: WVDNR District 1 Wildlife Management Areas

The Pedlar Wildlife Management Area is located on 766 acres (310 ha) east of Blacksville in Monongalia County, West Virginia. The wildlife management area is divided into two parts centered on 5.5-acre (2.2 ha) Dixon Lake and 14.5-acre (5.9 ha) Mason Lake, named for nearby Mason–Dixon line.

Pedlar was deeded to the West Virginia Division of Natural Resources by Consol Energy and initially opened in 2004. Improvements to the lakes and a public shooting range at Mason Lake were completed in 2007.
