= Elk River Trail =

State park in central West Virginia

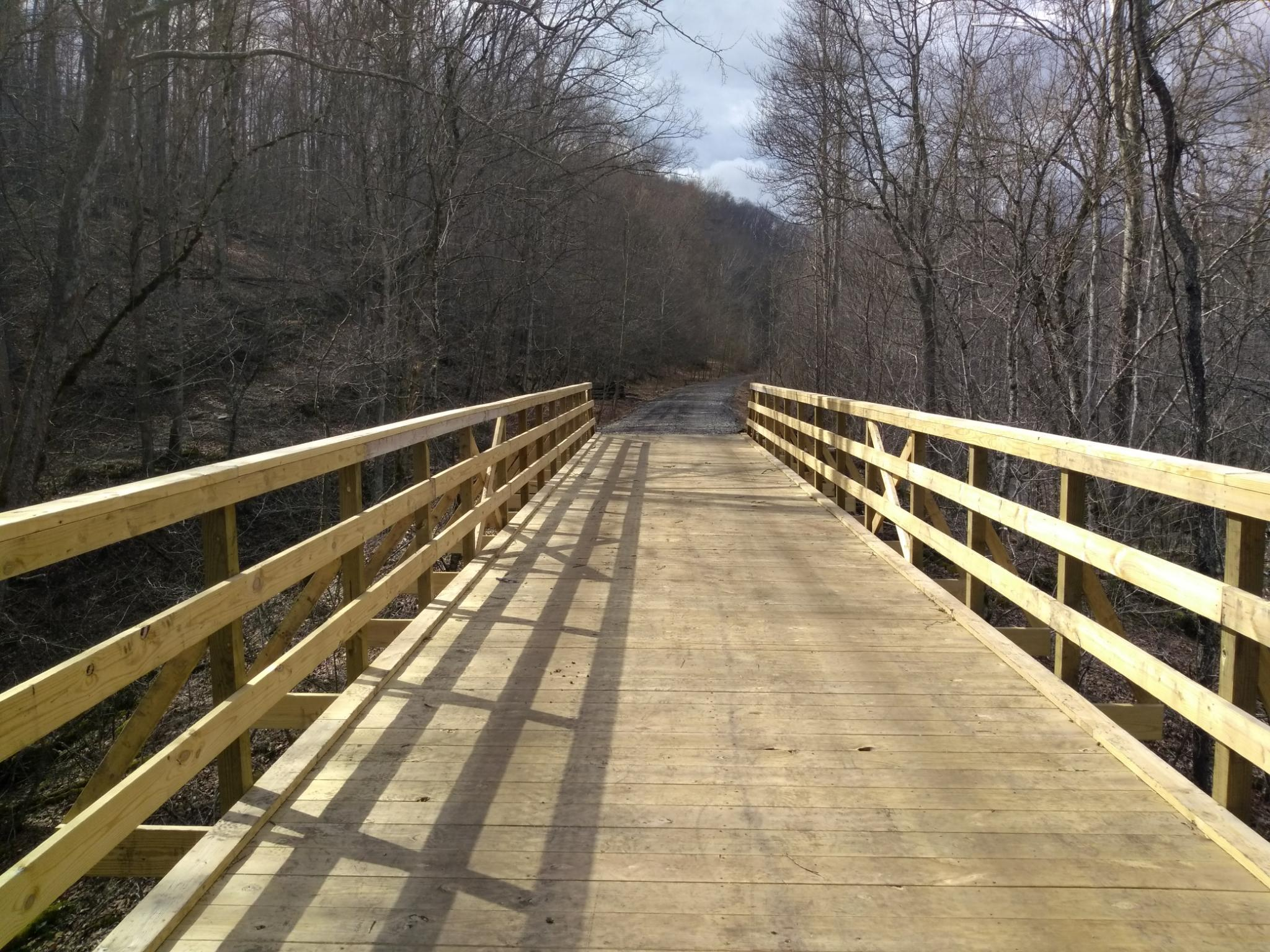
Coon Creek Bridge on the Elk River Trail, about 4 miles (6.4 km) downstream from Gassaway

The Elk River Trail is a state park under construction in central West Virginia, United States. It will follow a 74-mile-long portion of the former Coal and Coke Railway from Clendenin to Gilmer Station. The trail will follow the Elk River for a significant portion of its length (Clendenin to Gassaway). When completed, the trail will be one of the longest on the East Coast. In addition to assistance from the Appalachian Regional Commission, Americorps and local volunteers have contributed to the building and maintenance of the trail. The trail will provide opportunities for hiking, cycling, horseback riding, snowshoes, and cross-country skiing.

== Controversy ==
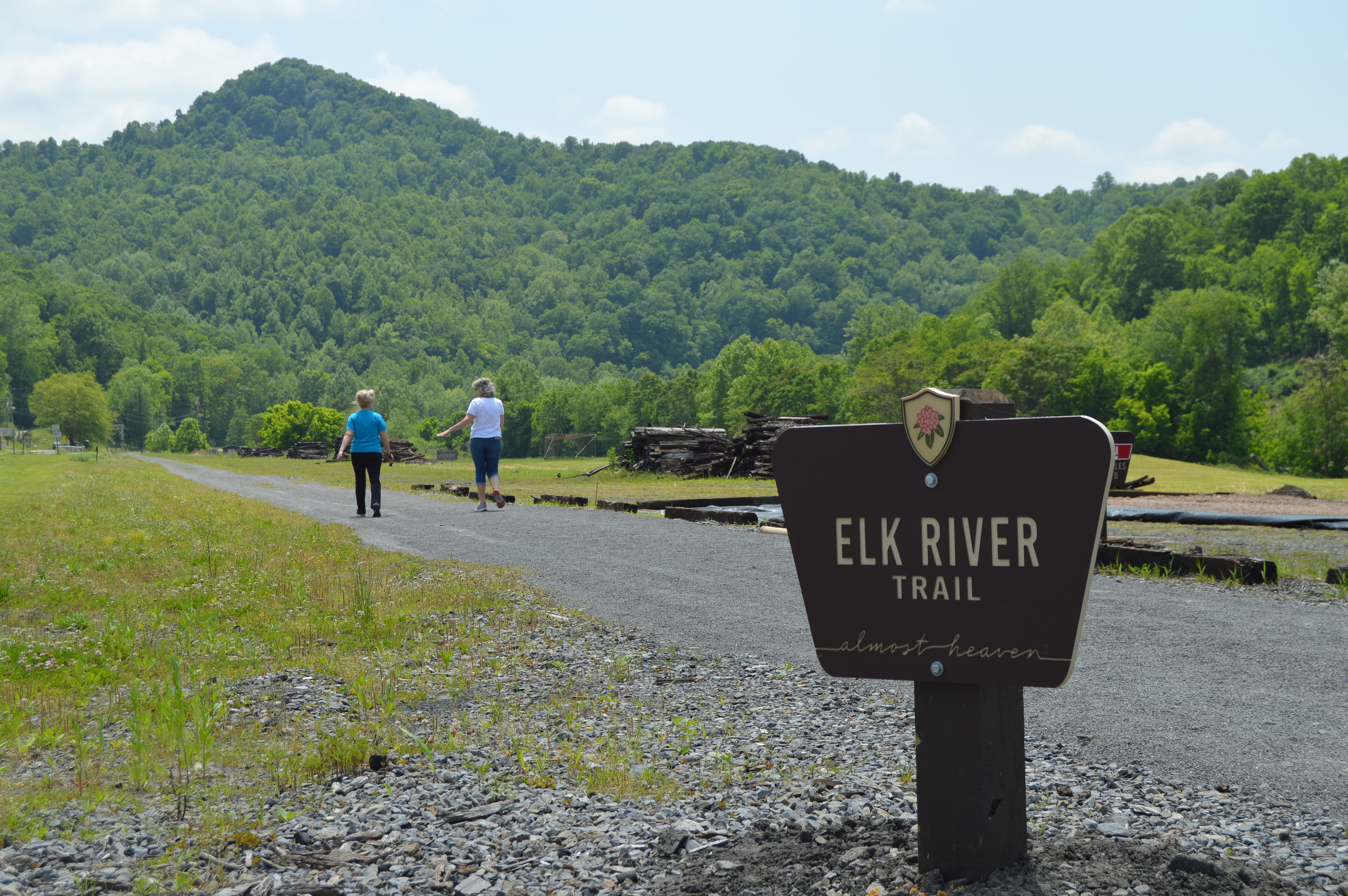
Elk River Trail sign

As construction on the trail progressed, several local residents voiced concerns about properties between the trail and the Elk River losing right of way access, as some property owners had become reliant on using the trail as a service road to get to their properties. The new trail regulations specifically prohibit access by motor vehicles, with the exception of some types of electric bicycles. In response, several local residents began building a legal case against the construction of the trail.
