= Crow, West Virginia =

Unincorporated community in West Virginia, United States

- Unincorporated community
- Location within West Virginia Location within the United States
- Coordinates: 37°45′33″N 81°04′36″W
- Country: United States
- State: West Virginia
- County: Raleigh
- Elevation: 2,507 ft (764 m)
- Time zone: UTC-5 (Eastern (EST))
  - Summer (DST): UTC-4 (EDT)
- Area codes: 304 & 681
- GNIS feature ID: 1537879

Crow is an unincorporated community in Raleigh County, West Virginia, United States. Crow is located on West Virginia Route 307, 6 miles (9.7 km) east-southeast of Beckley.

The community was named after the black crow native to the area.
