= Summersville Lake =

Dam and Lake in Nicholas County, West Virginia

Summersville Dam
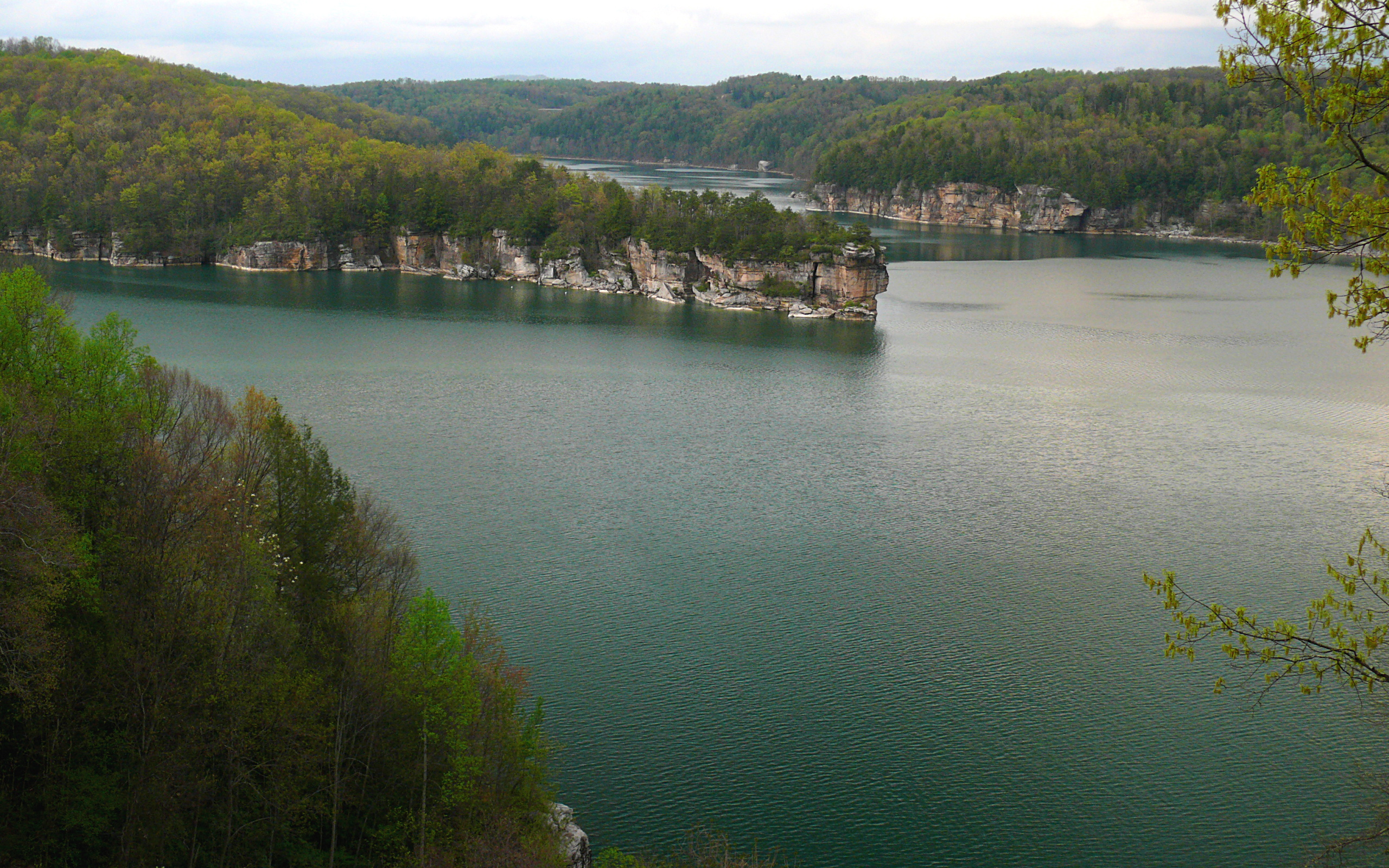
- Summersville Lake

- Location within West Virginia Location within the United States
- Country: United States
- Location: Nicholas County, near Summersville, West Virginia
- Coordinates: 38°13′23″N 80°53′26″W
- Construction began: 1960
- Opening date: 1966
- Operators: U.S. Army Corps of Engineers, Huntington District

Dam and spillways
- Impounds: Gauley River
- Height: 390 ft (120 m)
- Length: 2,280 ft (690 m)

Reservoir
- Creates: Summersville Lake
- Surface area: 2,700 acres (11 km^{2})
- Maximum water depth: 327 ft (100 m)
- Normal elevation: 1,652 ft (504 m)

Summersville Lake is a reservoir located in the US state of West Virginia. The lake is formed by a rock-fill dam (Summersville Dam) on the Gauley River, south of Summersville in Nicholas County. It is the largest lake in West Virginia, with a surface area of 2,700 acres (1,100 ha) and over 60 miles (97 km) of shoreline at the summer pool water level. Its maximum depth is 327 feet (100 m). Part of the northern shore of the lake is managed by the West Virginia State Park system.

== Dam ==
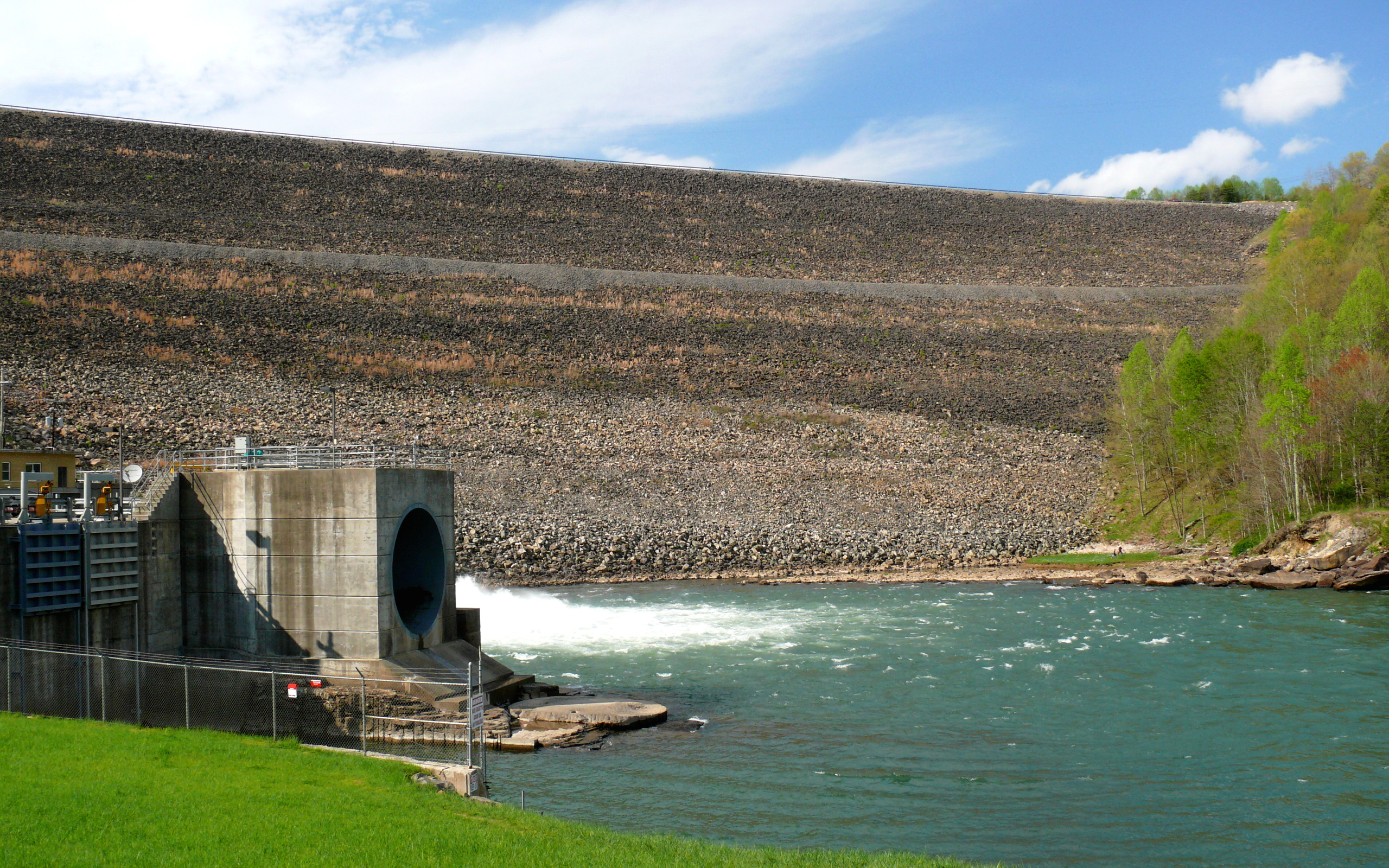
Summersville Dam

The lake was constructed between 1960 and 1966 by the United States Army Corps of Engineers in order to control flooding in an 803-square-mile (2,080 km^{2}) watershed along the Gauley River and the Kanawha River. At 390 feet (120 m) tall, 2,280 feet (690 m) long, and containing 12,000,000 cubic yards (9,200,000 m^{3}) of dirt and rock, the dam itself is the second-largest rock-fill dam in the Eastern United States. President Lyndon B. Johnson dedicated both the dam and a new Summersville Post Office on September 3, 1966.

== Hydroelectric project ==
In 2001, a two-year project was completed to harness the dam outflow for hydroelectric power generation. The power plant has a capacity to generate 80 megawatts of electricity at peak flow.

== Recreation ==
The lake also serves as a recreation area for fishing, boating, and rock climbing, as well as snorkeling and scuba diving. It serves as the eastern (upstream) end of Gauley River National Recreation Area. There is a small boat under the lake that was intentionally sunk to give divers something to view while scuba diving. Beyond the bridge that Route 19 crosses over the lake is a no-wake zone for casual boating. Located on the cliffs of Summersville Lake is the only working lighthouse in West Virginia, the Summersville Lake Lighthouse. Cliff Jumping has been banned at Summersville Lake since 2007.

=== State park ===
In August 2023, Governor Jim Justice announced that 177 acres of the lake's northern shore would become Summersville Lake State Park. The park has an emphasis on rock climbing. It also offers hiking and biking trails, water activities, and camping areas.

== Gallery ==
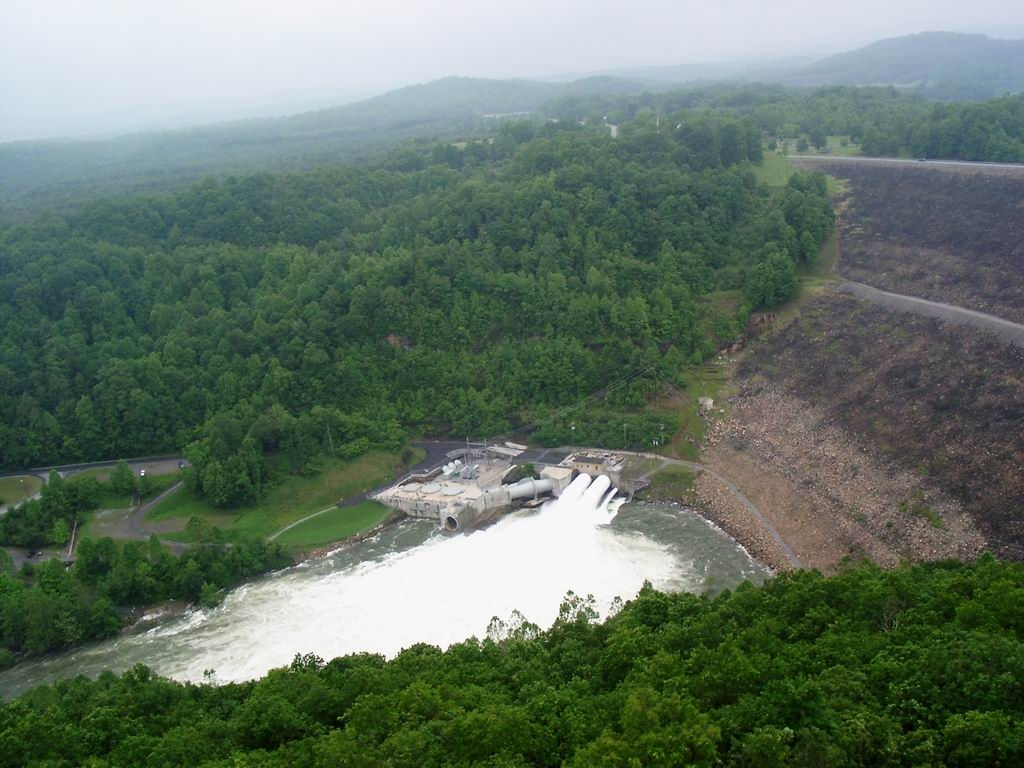
Summersville Dam.

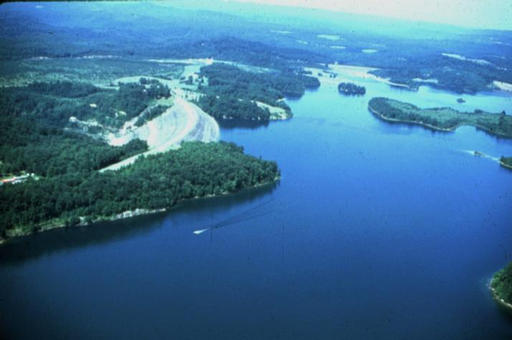
Aerial view of the lake.

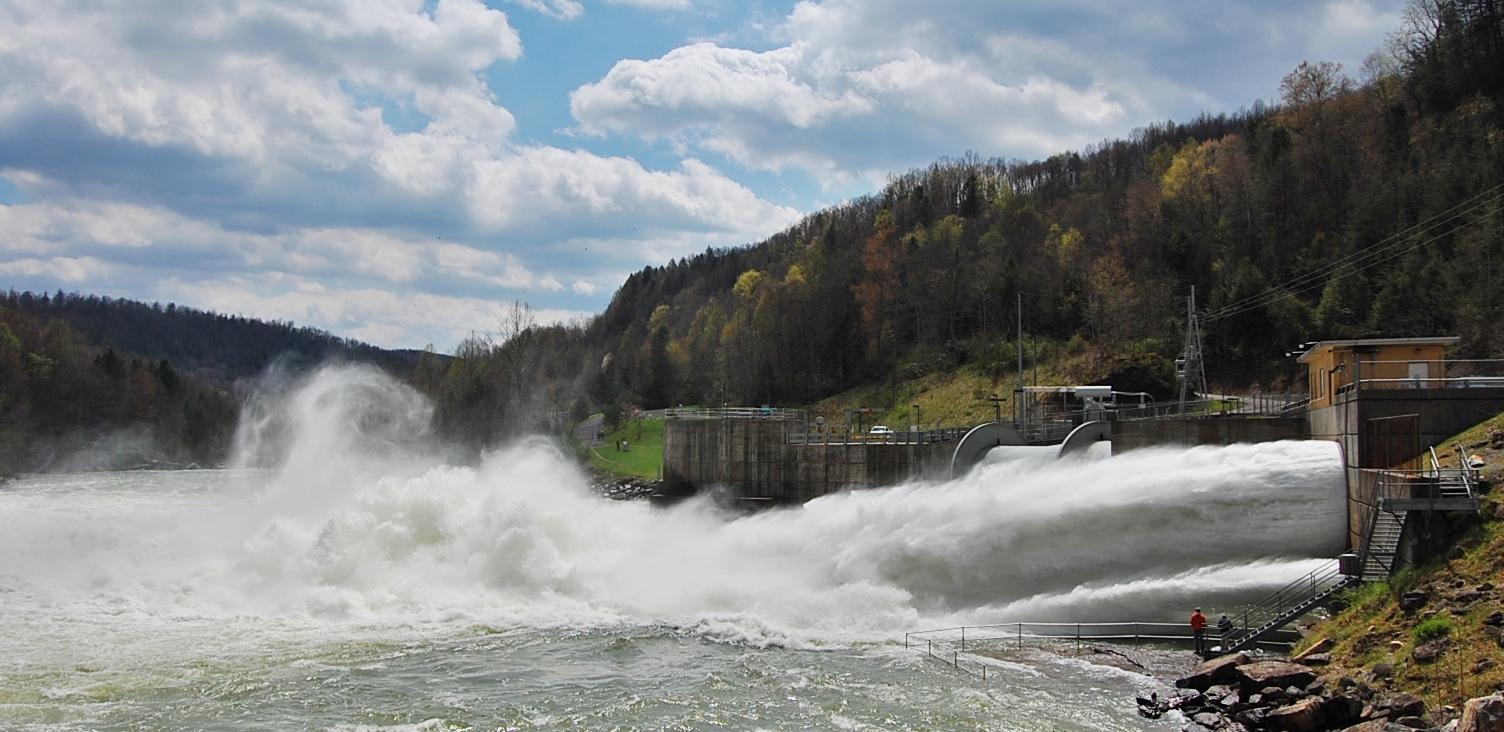
Spillway and tailwaters.

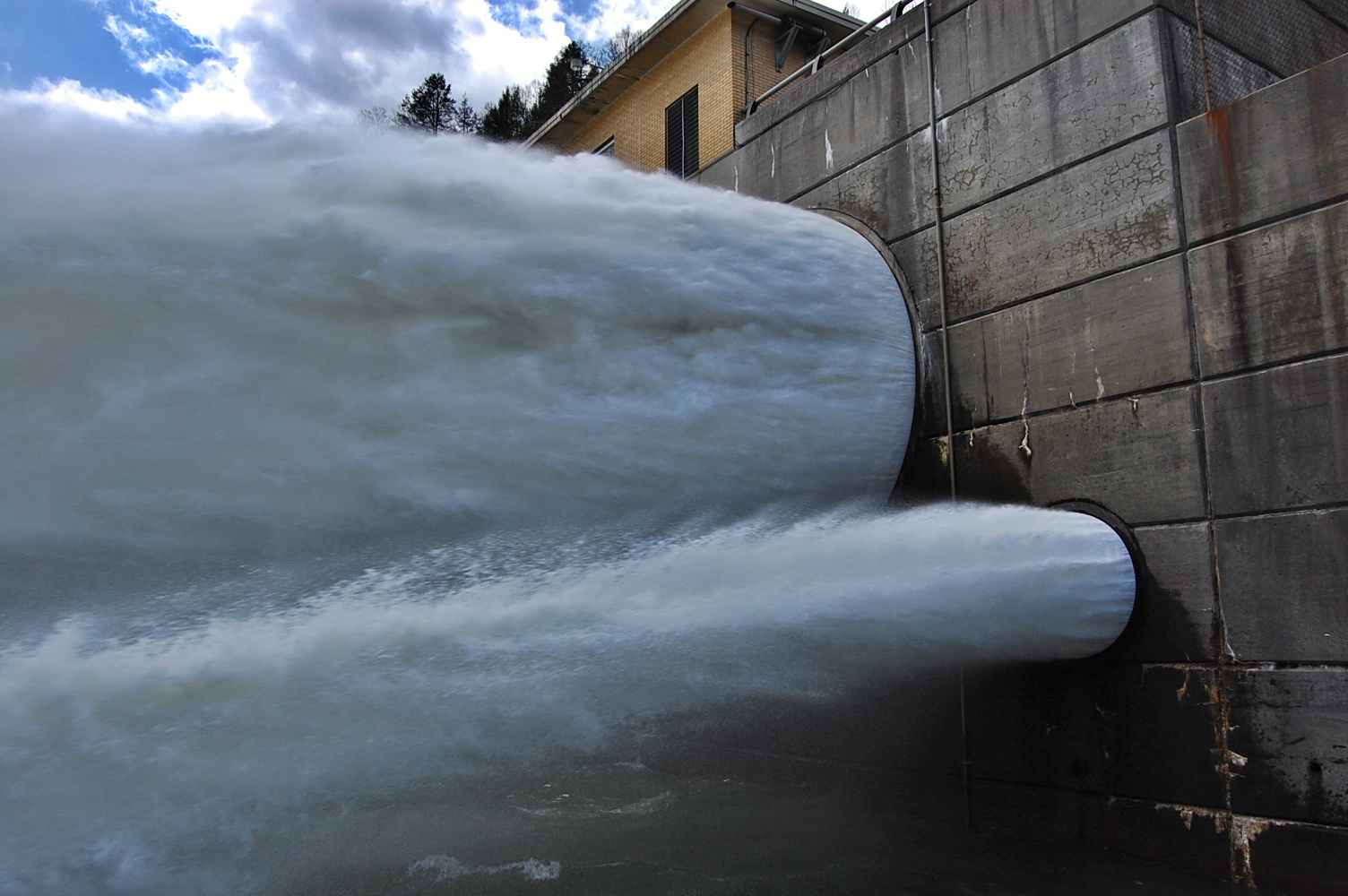
Detail of spillway.

== Popular culture ==
- Summersville Lake is a location in the game Fallout 76

== See also ==
- List of lakes of West Virginia
