= West Virginia Division of Natural Resources =

State agency of West Virginia

Agency overview
- Preceding agencies: West Virginia Department of Natural Resources; West Virginia Conservation Commission
- Jurisdiction: The state of West Virginia
- Headquarters: 112 California Avenue, Charleston, West Virginia 25305]
- Agency executives: Brett W. McMillion, Director; Brian Bolyard, Chief of Staff; Wendy L. Greene, Deputy Director
- Website: www.wvdnr.gov

The West Virginia Division of Natural Resources (WVDNR) is an agency of the government of the U.S. state of West Virginia. While formerly known as the cabinet-level Department of Natural Resources, it is now part of the West Virginia Department of Commerce. The WVDNR is responsible for wildlife management, hunting and fishing regulations, and boater safety and also oversees state parks and resorts. It also operates the West Virginia State Wildlife Center, a zoo in French Creek that exhibits West Virginian wildlife.

== Sections ==
=== Law Enforcement Section ===
The Law Enforcement Section, known as the "West Virginia Natural Resources Police", is the oldest statewide law enforcement agency in West Virginia, established in February 1897.

The Section is primarily responsible for the enforcement of the game and fish laws and rules. Officers in the section carry on a continuing program of Hunter Education and Boating Safety Education, as well as enforce laws relating to littering, forestry, state parks, environmental/solid waste, pleasure boating, and whitewater rafting. They also respond to emergencies, including floods and other natural disasters, as well as provide assistance to the West Virginia State Police where necessary.

The Natural Resources Police are maintained under Chapter 20, article 7 of the West Virginia Code.

=== Parks and Recreation Section ===
The Parks and Recreation Section is responsible for the operation of West Virginia's network of state parks, as well as recreation facilities located in some state forests and wildlife management areas.

=== Wildlife Resources Section ===
==== Wildlife management areas ====
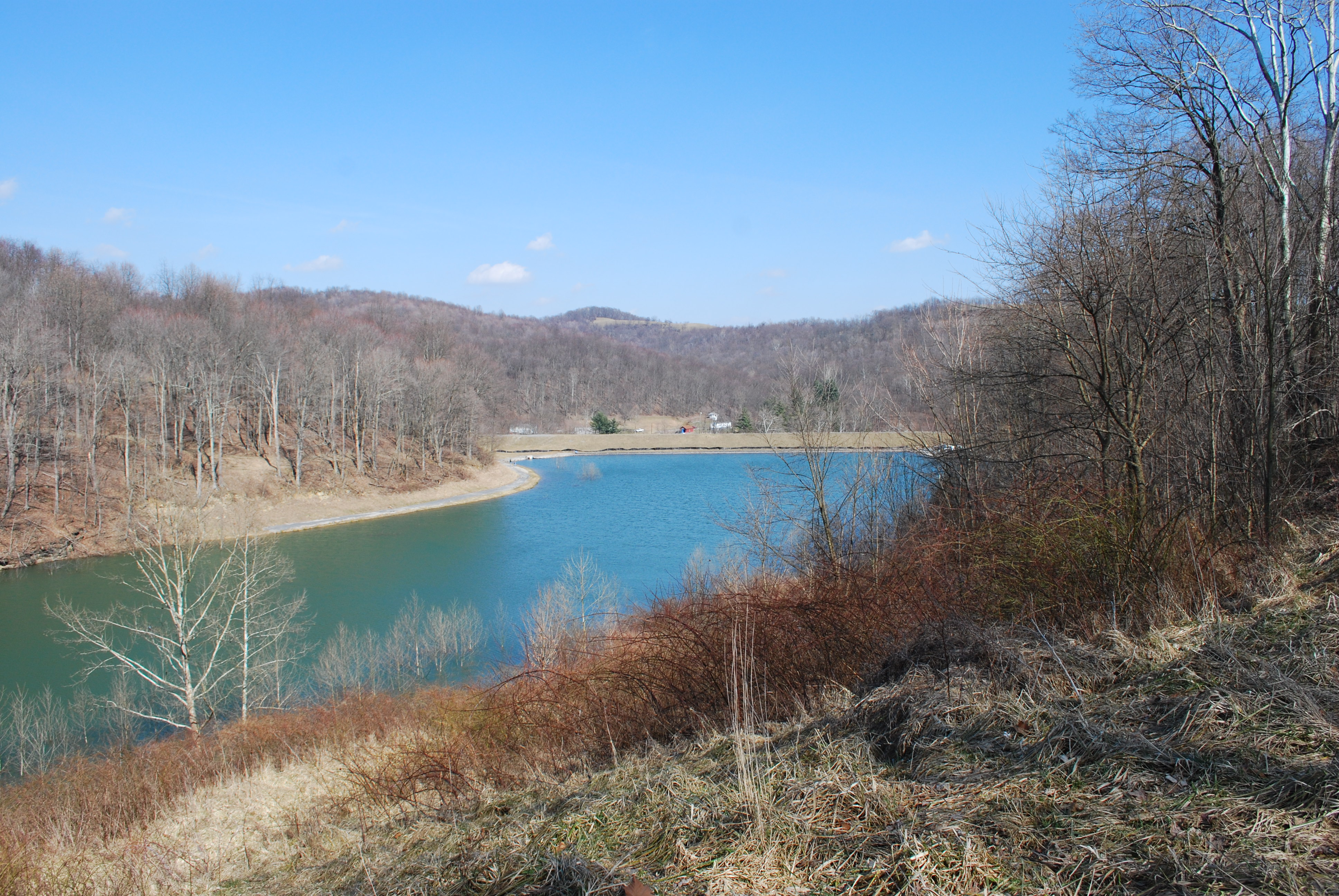
Mason Lake at Pedlar Wildlife Management Area

Wildlife Management Areas are managed by the WVDNR Wildlife Resources Section. These facilities are intended to provide opportunities for hunting and fishing within the state.

==== State Wildlife Center ====
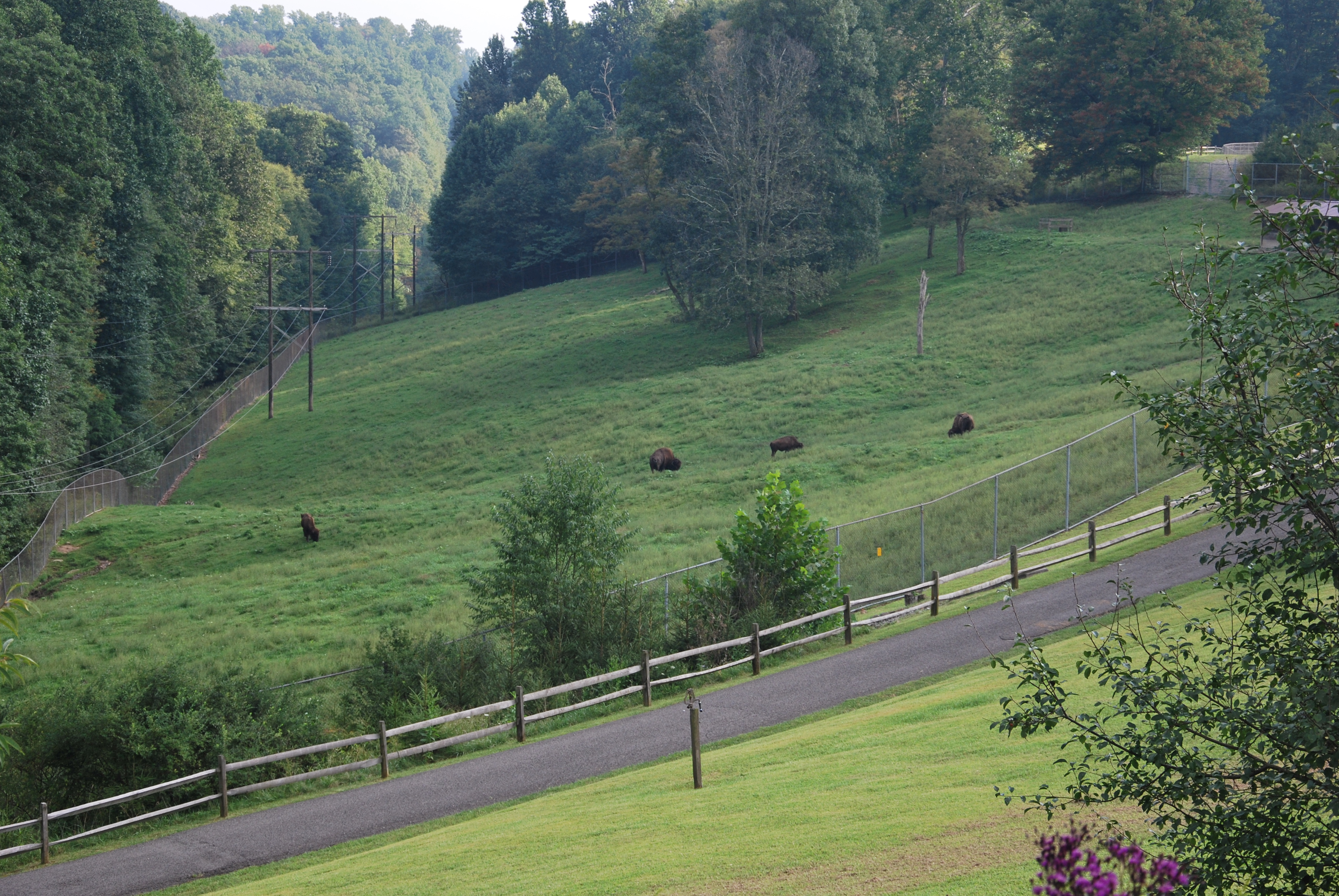
Bison at the State Wildlife Center

The Wildlife Resources Section also operates the West Virginia State Wildlife Center at French Creek, which is a zoological park exhibiting a variety of animals native to West Virginia.

==== Fish hatcheries ====
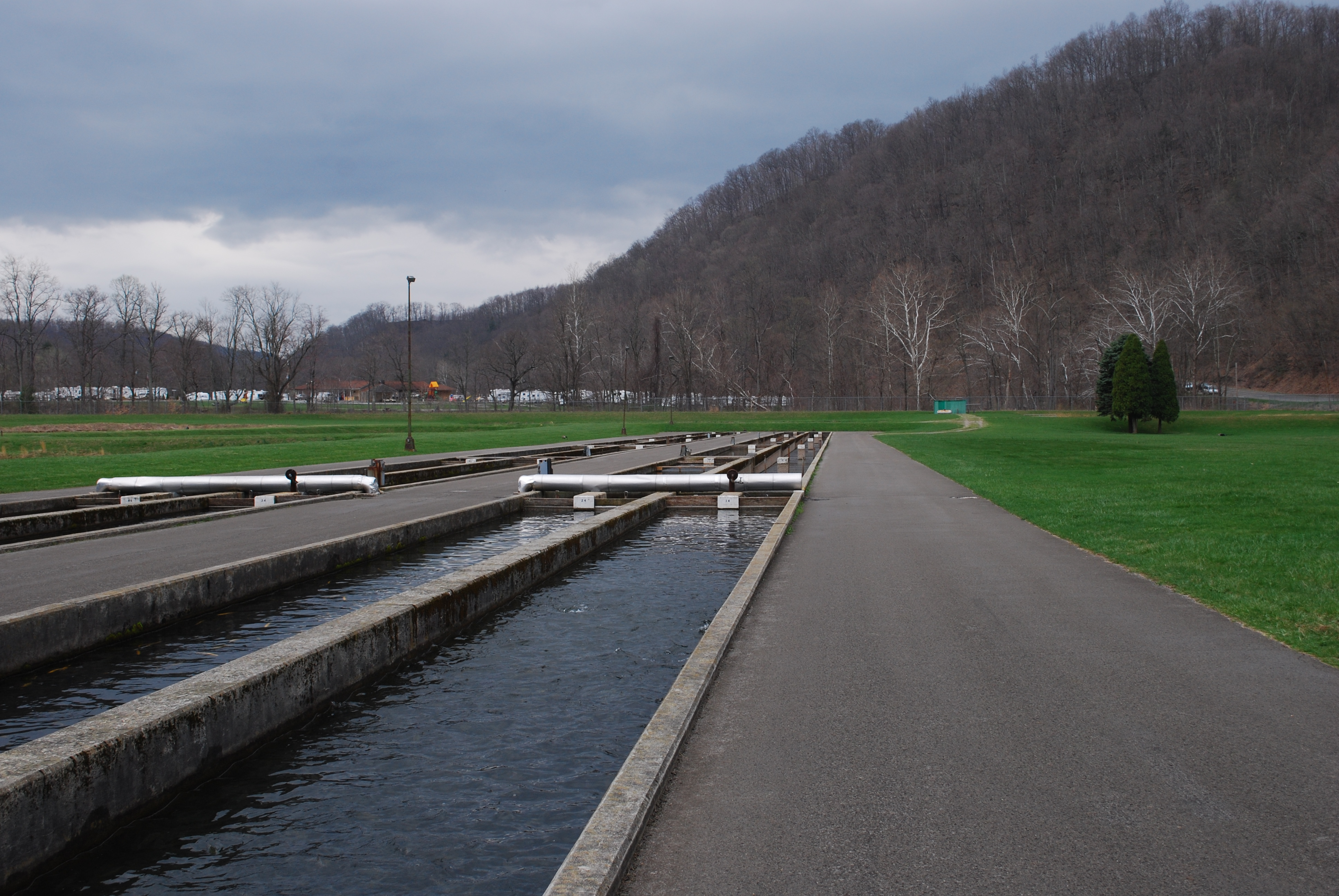
Bowden Fish Hatchery

West Virginia began stocking fish in state waterways in the 1880s and has been operating its own fish hatcheries since 1930. Today, the Wildlife Resources Section operates a network of seven trout hatcheries and two warmwater fish hatcheries.

- Apple Grove Fish Hatchery (warm water)
- Bowden Fish Hatchery (trout)
- Edray Fish Hatchery (trout)
- Palestine Fish Hatchery (warm water)
- Petersburg Fish Hatchery (trout)
- Reeds Creek Fish Hatchery (trout)
- Ridge Fish Hatchery (trout)
- Spring Run Fish Hatchery (trout)
- Tate Lohr Fish Hatchery (trout)
