= Gilham =

Gilham is a surname. Notable people with the surname include:

- Cherri Gilham (born 1944), British comedy actress
- George Gilham (1899–1937), American baseball player
- Mark Gilham (born 1957), British punk guitarist and songwriter
- Stephen Gilham (born 1984), Australian rules football player
- Tony Gilham (born 1979), British auto racing driver
- William Gilham (1818–1872), American soldier, teacher, chemist, and author
- Emma Gilham Page (1854–1932), daughter of William Gilham and wife of William N. Page

== See also ==
- Tony Gilham Racing, a British motor racing team
- Clarence C. Gilhams (1860–1912), American politician from Indiana
- Gilhams Lake, a lake on Willeo Creek in Atlanta, Georgia, United States
