= Page-Vawter House =

Historic house in West Virginia, United States

- U.S. National Register of Historic Places
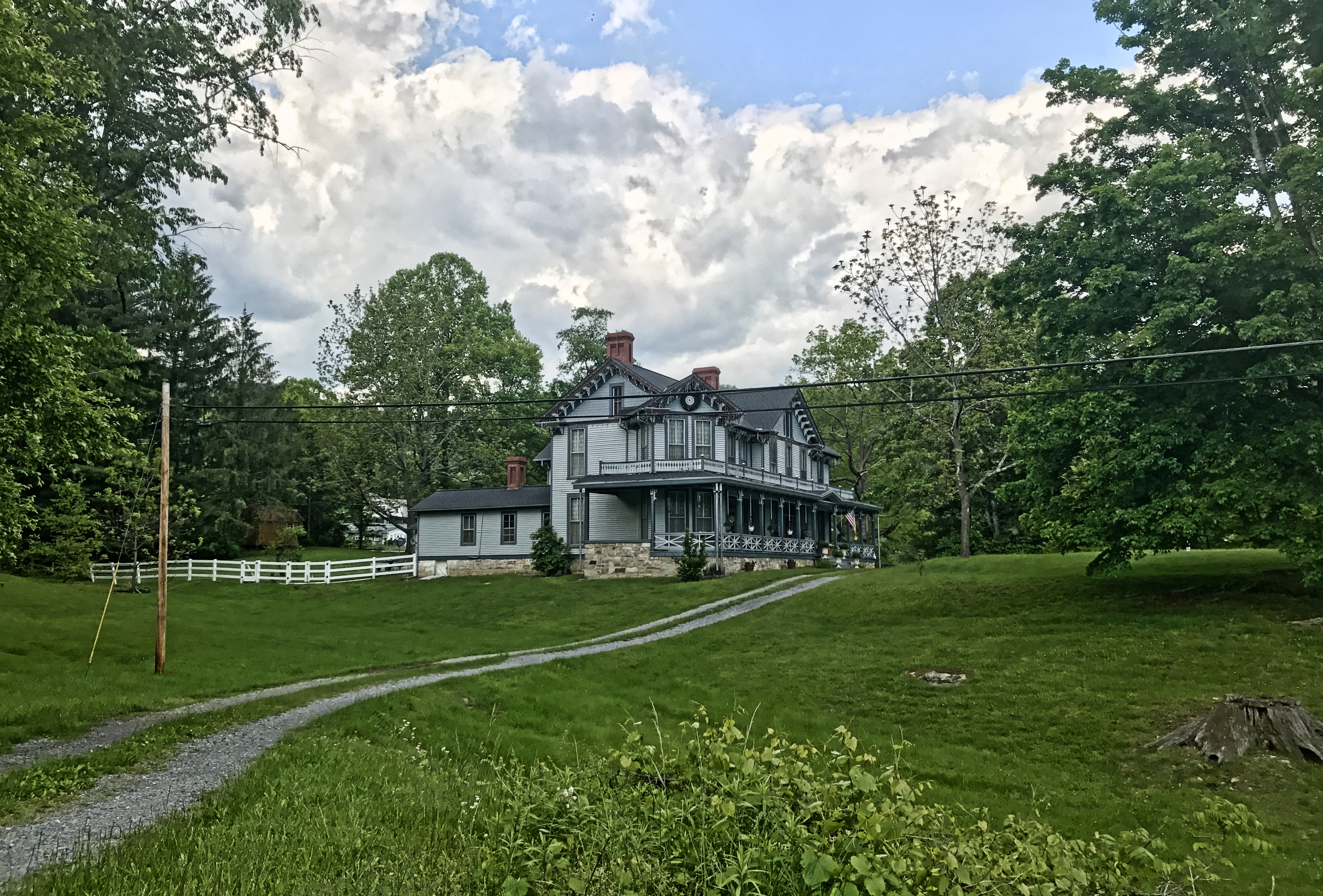
- The Page-Vawter House from the Midland Trail

- Location within West Virginia Location within the United States
- Location: Rt. Box 20, Ansted, West Virginia
- Coordinates: 38°8′13″N 81°6′6″W
- Area: 2.3 acres (0.93 ha)
- Built: 1890
- Architect: Minter, William
- Architectural style: Gothic
- NRHP reference No.: 85001813
- Added to NRHP: August 21, 1985

Page-Vawter House in the town of Ansted in Fayette County, West Virginia was built in 1889-90 by company carpenters of the Gauley Mountain Coal Company for the family of William Nelson Page, who was company president. The palatial Victorian mansion is located on a knoll in the middle of town. William and Emma (née Gilham) Page raised their four children there, attended by a staff of 8 servants.

Architect William Minter designed the house in a Gothic style. It has 15 regular rooms, plus a butler's pantry and a dressing room. There are 11 fireplaces with hand-carved wooden mantels; most are in different styles. Even the doors have ornately decorated hinges. The exterior features 52 8-foot-tall windows

According to author and railroad historian H. Reid in his book The Virginian Railway (Kalmbach, 1961), it was in this mansion that Page developed the plans for the coal-hauling Virginian Railway, which was financed by industrialist Henry Huddleston Rogers and became the "Richest Little Railroad in the World" after its completion in 1909. The nearby railroad town of Page was named for him.

The mansion was later occupied by several generations of the Vawter family. In the 21st century, it still stands as evidence of the once-thriving coal business. It underwent a ground up restoration in 2007 by former owners Jim and Debbie Campbell. It is currently owned by Dana Pauley and William Harmon who bought the house in 2021.

The Page-Vawter House was listed on the National Register of Historic Places in 1985.

== See also ==
- Hawk's Nest
- Midland Trail
