= William Nelson Page =

American civil engineer and industrialist

- Born: January 6, 1854
- Died: March 7, 1932 (aged 78)
- Engineering career
- Discipline: civil engineering
- Projects: Virginian Railway

William Nelson Page (January 6, 1854 – March 7, 1932) was an American civil engineer and industrialist. He was active in the Virginias following the U.S. Civil War. Page was widely known as a metallurgical expert by other industry leaders and investors as well as state and federal authorities.

William Page became one of the leading managers and developers of West Virginia's rich bituminous coalfields in the late-19th and early-20th century, as well as being deeply involved in building the railroads and other infrastructure necessary to process and transport the mined coal. Page often worked as a manager for absentee owners, such as the British geological expert, Dr. David T. Ansted, and the New York City mayor, Abram S. Hewitt of the Cooper-Hewitt organization and other New York and Boston financiers.He also worked as the "front man" in projects involving a silent partner, such as Henry H. Rogers. In the town of Ansted, for 28 years, the Page family lived in a large Victorian mansion built by carpenters of the Gauley Mountain Coal Company.

Most notable among Page's many accomplishments was a project to acquire land and construct a modest short-line railroad to tap new coal reserves in a rugged portion of southern West Virginia not yet reached by the bigger railroads. Connections planned to both the Chesapeake and Ohio Railway (C&O) and the Norfolk and Western Railway (N&W) should have inspired competition among rival carriers to transport the coal the rest of the way to market. However, collusion by the leaders of the large railroads attempted to stop the project through agreeing to only offer Page unprofitable rates. Instead of giving up, working with Rogers discreetly providing the millions needed for financing, William Page and his associates expanded the "short line" all the way hundred of miles across the Virginias to a new coal pier built on Hampton Roads, creating the Virginian Railway. Completed in 1909, the VGN was built to be very efficient and during the first half of the 20th century, became widely known as the "Richest Little Railroad in the World."

William and Emma completed their lives in Washington D.C., where they moved in 1917 as he served as a mining expert before federal regulators. One of their younger sons, Randolph Gilham "Dizzy" Page, was an early pioneer of the U.S. air mail industry during this time until his death of a heart attack at 36. William and Emma died in 1932 and 1933 respectively, and were interred in Richmond, Virginia's Hollywood Cemetery.

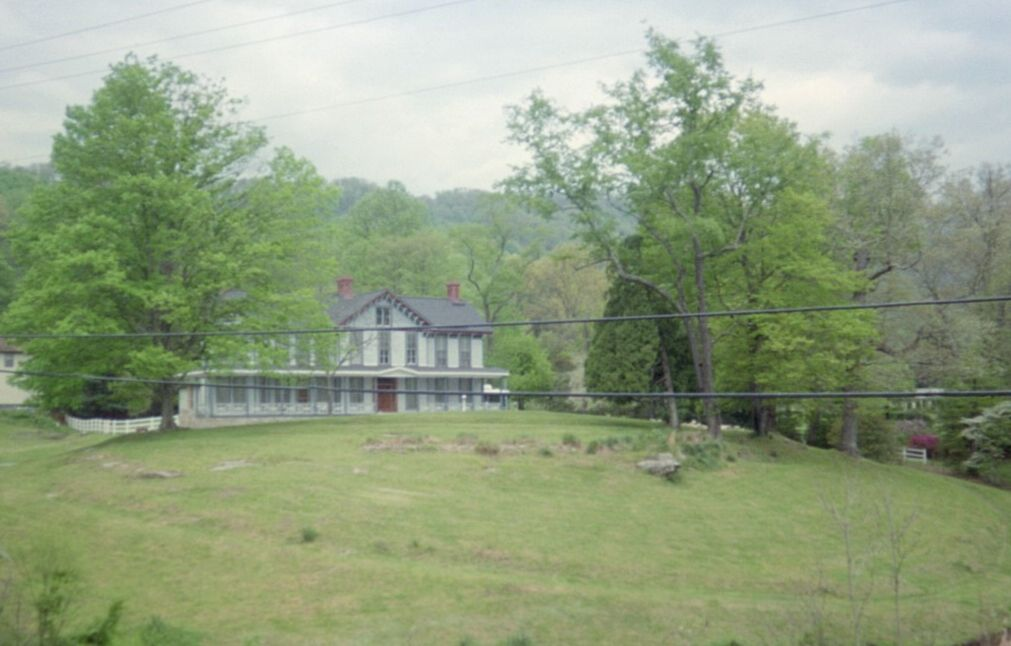
A view of the Page-Vawter House in Ansted, West Virginia from the Midland Trail

== Early life, heritage of public service ==
William Nelson Page was born at "Locust Grove" in Campbell County, Virginia, on January 6, 1854 into an old Virginia family. His parents were Edwin Randolph Page and Olivia (née Alexander) Page, a scion of the Nelson family. He descended from historic roots; the Nelson and Page families were each among the "First Families of Virginia", families who were prominent in the Virginia Colony.

Through the Nelson family, he was a descendant of Robert "King" Carter, who served as an acting royal governor of Virginia and was one of its wealthiest landowners in the late 17th and early 18th centuries. After the American Revolutionary War, two of his great-grandfathers served as Governor of the Commonwealth of Virginia. Some years later, in 1905, another relative, Logan Waller Page, became the first head of the U.S. Bureau of Public Roads, an early precursor of the agency which became the U.S. Department of Transportation. Logan Page served as an energetic advocate of the country's early interstate highway system until his death in 1918.

Although his father died in 1861, and notwithstanding the financial hardships which were widespread in the South brought on by the Civil War which began that year, from a family base in Rockbridge and Augusta counties, where his mother and siblings relocated, young William Nelson Page was educated at the University of Virginia as a civil engineer.

After the cessation of hostilities in 1865, as he launched his career, he participated in some local politics and civic activities, but primarily directed his considerable energies into developing transportation and mineral resources in the mountainous regions of Virginia and the newly formed state of West Virginia. Between 1871 and 1876, William Page played a role in engineering and building the Chesapeake and Ohio Railway (C&O), which was under the leadership of Collis P. Huntington. Initially, he led one of the surveying parties charged with mapping the route of a double-track railway that had been ordered by Congress. This new railway was expected to run between Richmond, Virginia and the Ohio River (at what became Huntington, West Virginia), via the valleys of the James River and Jackson River in Virginia, and the New River and Kanawha River in West Virginia. He chose the location and directed the construction of several important C&O bridges. While working with the C&O, Page became fascinated with the potential of the untapped mineral resources of West Virginia.

== Family and children ==
William's father, a farmer, died in 1862, but his education continued. Olivia Page, William's widowed mother, owned several farms in Rockbridge County, Virginia, where she relocated. Both William and Emma had roots in the central Shenandoah Valley area named for nearby Natural Bridge.

His future wife, Emma Hayden Gilham, had been born at Lexington in Rockbridge County, Virginia. She was the youngest daughter of Major William Gilham, a former Commandant of the Virginia Military Institute (VMI). Emma's parents moved to Richmond at the outset of the American Civil War, where her father helped with Virginia and Confederate troop training. after the end of hostilities in 1865, he worked for a fertilizer company. He died in 1872.

On February 8, 1882, Page married Emma Hayden Gilham in Richmond, Virginia. By this time, William had become well-established in the region and had been named as General Manager and a Director of the Gauley Mountain Coal Company at the urging of an old friend and trustee, attorney Thomas D. Ransom of Staunton, Virginia.

Emma and William settled in the town of Ansted in Fayette County, West Virginia, where they raised their family, which included four children who lived beyond infancy. Their palatial white Victorian mansion was built by Gauley Mountain Coal Company carpenters, on a knoll in the middle of town. Later known as the Page-Vawter House, it remained has been preserved and restored and remained as a community landmark as of 2010.

== Entrepreneur and developer ==
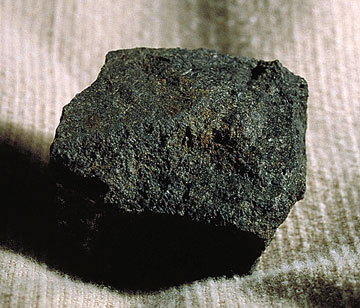
Bituminous coal

Page's training and experience as a civil engineer prepared him to help develop West Virginia's huge deposits of "smokeless" bituminous coal, a product exceptionally well-suited for making steel. Former West Virginia Governor William A. MacCorkle described him as a man who knew the land "as a farmer knows a field."

Page became a protégé of Dr. David T. Ansted, a noted British geologist with large land holdings in southern West Virginia. As his career developed, Page busied himself with many enterprises to develop the natural resources which lay all around him, primarily working with iron and coal operations, often as the manager for absentee owners.

He was the general manager of the Hawks Nest Coal Co. between 1877 and 1880, superintendent of the Victoria Blast Furnace at Goshen, Virginia from 1880 to 1885, and he located and built the Powellton bridge for the C&O between 1885 and 1889. After developing the Mt. Carbon Collieries, he organized and developed the Gauley Mountain Coal Company, and he became a consulting engineer for other coal-producing firms as well. He was also involved with the Virginia and Pittsburgh Land Association (a land development company) and the Pittsburgh and Virginia Railroad Company.

Of course, with his background with the C&O, Page was intensely interested in railroads, and he gained even more practical railroad experience after winning the contract to convert the C&O branch-line track, from the New River main line, up the mountainside to Ansted, to standard gauge. The project was completed on 20 August 1890, at a cost of $35,038.44.

He was later a principal of the Page Coal and Coke Company.

== "Idea man from Ansted" ==
William and Emma Page settled their family in the tiny mountain hamlet of Ansted, a town with a population of 2,000 (named for Dr. Ansted) located in Fayette County, West Virginia. Ansted sits on high bluffs on Gauley Mountain near an outcropping of rocks called Hawk's Nest overlooking the New River far below, where the Chesapeake and Ohio Railway tracks occupied both sides of the narrow valley. In the late 1870s, Emma and William's widowed mother, Olivia Page, who had come to live with them, were influential in establishing the Church of the Redeemer, the Episcopal Church in Ansted.

In 1889, while he was president of the Gauley Mountain Coal Company, Page had a palatial white Victorian mansion built by company carpenters on a knoll in the middle of town. Architect William Minter designed the house in a Gothic style. It has 15 regular rooms, plus a butler's pantry and a dressing room. There are 11 fireplaces with hand-carved wooden mantels; most are in different styles. Even the doors have ornately decorated hinges. The exterior features 52 8-foot-tall windows. The mansion, now known as the Page-Vawter House, became a symbol of wealth and power. It remains a community landmark over 100 years later.

"Colonel" Page, as he became known, was in truth, a uniformed captain and later a major in a locally recruited Spanish–American War militia. ("Colonel" was an honorific title used informally in the South for many notable men in the years following the American Civil War). A colorful character by all accounts, he was described as a slight man who was known for his handlebar mustache, pince-nez glasses, iron bowler derby, and elegant suits. He was considered to be somewhat aloof by the local population, and could frequently be seen riding a bicycle on the sloping lawn of the mansion, where eight servants were employed.

Described years later by author H. Reid as "the idea man from Ansted," Page spent long hours working in the den just off the main entrance to his resplendent home. In addition to pursuing business interests, Page also found time to serve as the mayor of Ansted for 10 years and rose to the rank of brigadier inspector general in the West Virginia National Guard. In 1907, he was named as the first president of Ansted National Bank. He was also an incorporator and director of Sheltering Arms Hospital in neighboring Kanawha County.

However, of all of his many activities, William Nelson Page is probably best known for the founding and building of the Virginian Railway (VGN). It started much like just another of his many projects, but would ultimately grow far beyond its original scope. The story of the building of the Virginian Railway has been described as a textbook example of natural resources, railroads, and a smaller company taking on big business (and winning) early in the 20th century.

== Building the Virginian Railway ==
Some historians will hold that the Loup Creek enterprise originally was planned to be just another local mining operation, one that would ship primary product, coal, out of the region via the common carrier railroads. Officially, it was only after problems arose that the plan was expanded to build and operate rail connections, or even build all the way to the sea. This is the version Page used in an I.C.C. hearing.

However, other historians believe that a goal of the plan from the outset was to transport from the mineheads to reach a shipping point without using these common carriers, who as owners of vast coal lands and many mines, were also competitors. There was a lot at stake, as the C&O and the N&W through the secret "community of interests" pact were carefully controlling coal shipping rates. A non-affiliated competitor would threaten that cozy relationship.

Most notable among Page's many projects was a partnership with absentee investors, begun in 1898, to acquire land and construct a modest short-line railroad to tap new coal reserves in a rugged portion of southern West Virginia not yet reached by the bigger railroads. The project was intended to establish connections to both the Chesapeake and Ohio Railway (C&O) and the Norfolk and Western Railway (N&W), which should have inspired competition among rival carriers to transport the coal the rest of the way to market. However, collusion by the leaders of the large railroads (lawful in an era before U.S. anti-trust laws were enacted) resulted in rates to transport the coal the additional distances to markets which, potentially, would have stopped the project.

However, if the C&O and N&W presidents thought they could discourage Page from developing the new areas, they were mistaken. One of the silent investors Page had enlisted was millionaire industrialist Henry Huttleston Rogers, a principal in John D. Rockefeller's Standard Oil Trust. A master at competitive "warfare", Henry Rogers did not like to lose, and, as one of the wealthiest men in America, he also had nearly unlimited resources.

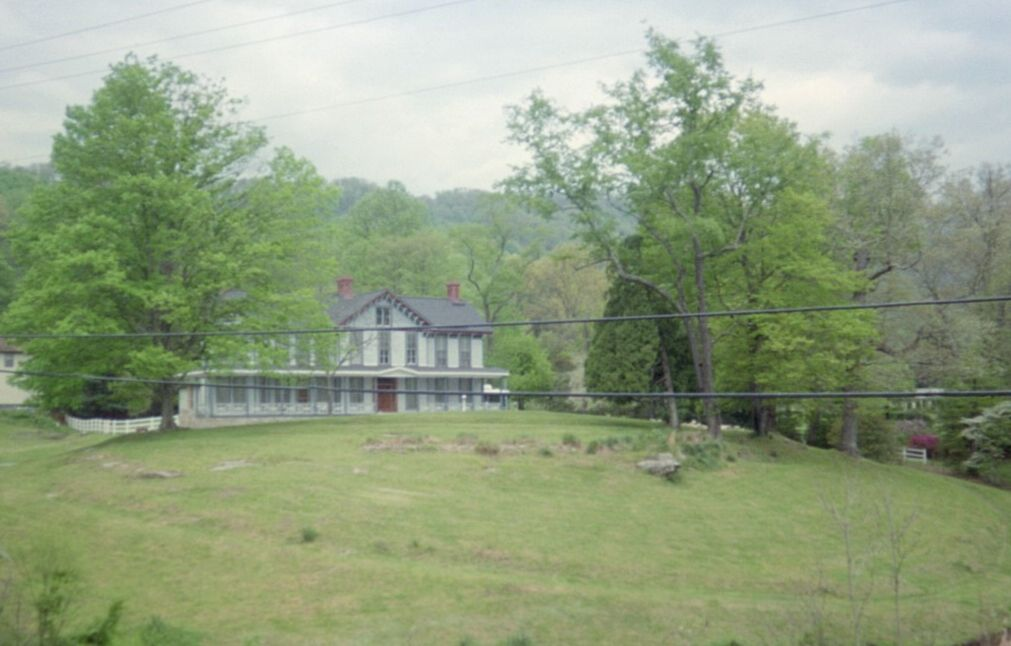
A view of the Page-Vawter House in Ansted, West Virginia from the Midland Trail

While Page continued to meet with the big railroads for rate negotiations that always seemed unproductive, he and Rogers secretly planned a route and acquired rights-of-way all of the way across Virginia to Hampton Roads, a distance of some 440 miles (710 km). By the time they realized what was happening, the C&O and N&W executives were faced with a new major competitor, a third railroad with direct access to an ocean port.

=== Victoria is created ===
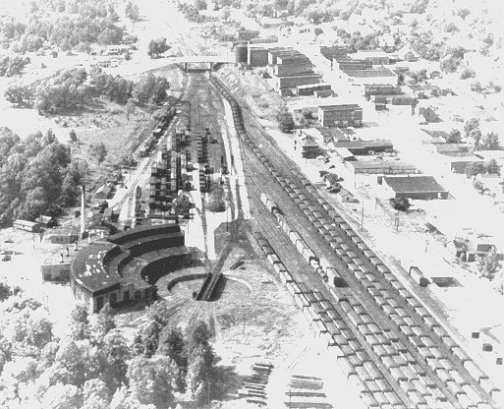
This aerial shot of Victoria was taken in 1954 looking west. It shows the turntable and roundhouse in the lower left, and the passenger station and Norfolk division offices to the right of the tracks.

Late in 1906, near the halfway point on the Tidewater Railway between Roanoke and Sewell's Point, a new town with space set aside for railroad offices and shops was created in Lunenburg County, Virginia. It was named Victoria, in honor of Queen Victoria of the United Kingdom, who was long-admired by Henry Rogers.

Victoria was the location of a large equipment maintenance operation, with roundhouse, turntable, coaling and water facilities for servicing steam locomotives, a large rail yard with many tracks, and a large single-story passenger station. Offices for the VGN's Norfolk Division were built by adding a second floor to the passenger station building a few years later.

=== Virginian Railway born, Jamestown Exposition ===
Early in 1907, with substantial portions of each still under construction, the Deepwater and Tidewater Railways were combined to become the Virginian Railway. On April 15, 1907, William Nelson Page was elected as its first president.

About the same time, a large stretch of the eastern portion of the Tidewater had been completed and regular passenger service was established between Norfolk and Victoria. This proved just in time for the new railroad to serve the Jamestown Exposition, which was held on land adjacent to the VGN coal pier site at Sewell's Point. At the exposition, Page served as Chief of International Jury of Awards, Mines and Metallurgy.

On April 26, 1907, US President Theodore Roosevelt opened the exposition. Mark Twain was another honored guest, arriving with his friend Henry Rogers on the latter's steam yacht, the Kanawha. In addition to President Roosevelt, the newly renamed Virginian Railway (VGN) transported many of the 3 million persons who attended before the Exposition closed on December 1, 1907.

=== Financial panic of 1907 – Rogers has stroke ===
Work progressed on the VGN during 1907 and 1908 using construction techniques not available when the larger railroads had been built about 25 years earlier, achieving a more favorable route and grade. By paying for work with Henry Rogers' own personal fortune, the railway was built with no public debt. This feat, a key feature of the successful secrecy in securing the route, was in all likelihood not part of Rogers' initial planning, and was not accomplished without some considerable burden to the financier, however. He had suffered some setbacks in the Financial Panic of 1907 which began in March of that year. Then, a few months later, he experienced a debilitating apoplectic stroke. Fortunately, Henry Rogers recovered his health, at least partially, and saw to it that construction was continued on the new railroad until it was finally completed early in 1909.

=== Final spike, celebrations ===
The final spike in the VGN was driven on 29 January 1909, at the west end of the massive New River Bridge at Glen Lyn, near where the new railroad crossed the West Virginia-Virginia state line. The former Deepwater and Tidewater Railways were now physically connected.

In April, 1909, Henry Huttleston Rogers and Mark Twain, old friends, returned to Norfolk together once again for a huge celebration of the new "Mountains to the Sea" railroad's completion. Despite rain that day, a huge crowd of Norfolk citizens was waiting with great excitement at the shore to meet them. While Rogers toured the railway's new $2.5-million coal pier at Sewell's Point, Mark Twain spoke to groups of students at several local schools. That night, at a grand banquet held in downtown Norfolk, the city's civic leaders, Mark Twain, Rogers, and other dignitaries spoke. In either event, with the building of the VGN, what was accomplished was that a third shipper was established.

Rogers left the next day on his first (and only) tour of the newly completed railroad. He died suddenly, only six weeks later, at the age of 69, at his home in New York, because of another stroke. By then, the work of the Page-Rogers partnership in Building the Virginian Railway was complete.

== Accomplishments ==
The new railroad opened up isolated communities in both West Virginia and Virginia and soon helped develop new coalfields and other industries.

Throughout its 50-year history, the VGN followed the Page-Rogers policy of "paying up front for the best." It became known for treating its employees and vendors well. The VGN operated some of the largest and most innovative steam, electric, and diesel locomotives, and earned the nickname "Richest Little Railroad in the World."

In time, the big railroads learned to coexist with their newer competitor, and came to regret turning down opportunities to purchase it before completion. There were many failed attempts by each of them and others to acquire the VGN.

Eventually, the owners of the VGN agreed to merge with arch-rival Norfolk and Western Railway in 1959. In 2004, much of the former Virginian Railway is still in use by N&W successor Norfolk Southern Railway (NS). The well-engineered low-gradient VGN route helps NS compete efficiently with rival CSX Transportation (successor to the VGN's old rival C&O) and non-rail transport modes in the transportation markets of the 21st century.

== Later years ==
After the Virginian Railway had been completed, Page busied himself with the coal-mining business in West Virginia, until he retired in 1917. He and his family then moved to Washington, D.C. William Nelson Page died at his home in Washington, in 1932, at the age of 78. He was interred in Hollywood Cemetery in Richmond, Virginia, where his wife, Emma, who died the following 14 February, is also buried.

William Page and Emma Gilham both had roots and family in the Augusta County and Rockbridge County area of the upper Shenandoah Valley. (William's married sister lived in Staunton, Virginia.) They had four children who survived childhood: Delia Hayden Page (born 1882), Edwin Randolph Page (1884–1949), Mary Josephine Page (1893–1962), and Randolph Gilham Page (1893–1930). They also had two other children who died in infancy: Evan Powell Page (born 1887) and William Gilham Page (born 1890).

== Legacy ==
The unincorporated West Virginia coal and railroad towns of Page in Fayette County and Pageton in McDowell County were named for him. The Page Coal and Coke Company operated in each, although coal mining has long since ended. The old company store in Pageton is listed on the National Register of Historic Places.

In the 21st century, William and Emma's mansion, now known as the Page-Vawter House, still stands in Ansted, on a high knoll, overlooking the town and the New River Valley. It is evidence of the once-thriving coal business. Later occupied by the Vawter family, the Page-Vawter House is also listed on the National Register of Historic Places. Nearby, breathtaking Hawk's Nest overlooks the New River Gorge National River.

The seemingly remotely located terminal Page and Rogers planned and built at Sewell's Point played an important role in 20th-century U.S. naval history. Beginning in 1917, the former Jamestown Exposition grounds adjacent to the VGN coal pier became an important facility for the United States Navy. The VGN transported the high quality "smokeless" West Virginia bituminous coal favored by the US Navy for its ships and submarines, providing a reliable supply during both World Wars. Today, the former VGN property at Sewell's Point is part of the Norfolk Navy Base, the largest naval facility in the world.

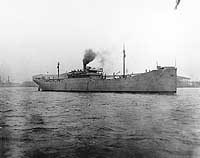
USS William N. Page 1918–19

After Page retired in 1917, a ship was named in his honor. William N. Page was a steamship built at Camden, New Jersey, by the New York Ship Building and Dry Dock Corp. It was taken over by the US Navy for operation by the Naval Overseas Transportation Service (NOTS) and commissioned on December 18, 1918. After fitting out, William N. Page loaded general cargo and locomotives and departed for France. It made several transatlantic trips through the treacherous German U-boat infested waters before finally returning to Norfolk where on May 31, 1919, it was decommissioned by the Navy. After its brief naval career, the William N. Page remained in active merchant service for nearly three decades. Its successive owners and operators included the Mystic Steamship Co., the Koppers Coal Co., and Eastern Gas and Fuel Associates. The latter two companies were majority owners of the Virginian Railway after purchasing a controlling interest from Rogers' heirs in 1936.

In 2005, the initials "H.H.R." and 'W.N.P." were engraved in the rails of a short stretch of new roadbead laid for a caboose to be displayed at Victoria, a town they caused to be founded on the "Mountains to Sea" railroad. Their Virginian Railway has turned out to be a lasting tribute, both to Henry Huttleston Rogers, and to William Nelson Page, the "Idea Man from Ansted".
