= Mystery Hole =

Tourist attraction in Fayette County, West Virginia, United States

Coordinates: 38°7′26.5″N 81°8′28.1″W

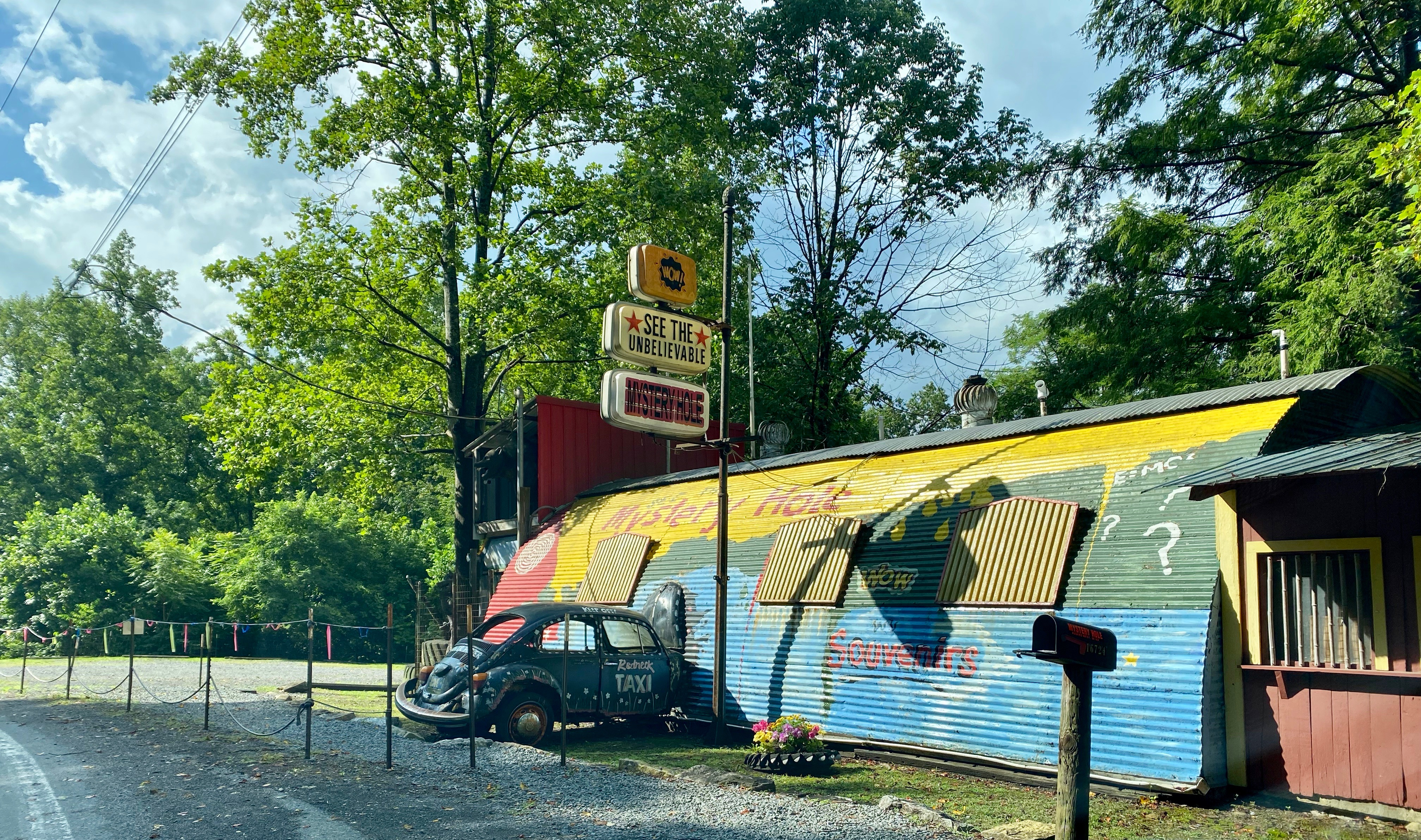
Mystery Hole attraction in 2025

The Mystery Hole is a roadside attraction in Ansted, West Virginia, near Hawks Nest State Park and Cathedral Falls in the New River Gorge National Park and Preserve. It is immediately adjacent to the Midland Trail (U.S. Route 60) in Fayette County, and it promotes itself as a gravity-defying wonder.

== History ==
The attraction was created by Donald Wilson in 1973. Wilson was a retired Union Carbide employee and a Navy veteran. The original guided tour entry fee was $1.00, which Wilson sometimes waived.

Mystery Hole includes sideshow-esque attractions such as balls that roll uphill. A chair for sitting is on the wall, while standing straight actually makes you look leaning sideways. It has been described in guidebooks as "Weird" and "WV's Quirkiest Attraction".

There is also a 1960s Volkswagen Beetle that seems to have crashed into the side, with a flower power-inspired paint job, as well as a black gorilla guarding the attraction. The VW was painted by a local artist, Sherd Maynard, and the late artist's daughter, Amber, eventually refreshed it with updated art.

Wilson closed the attraction in 1996 and died shortly after, and Mystery Hole was neglected and damaged by vandals.

In 2016, the "world-famous" West Virginia roadside attraction, including several outbuildings and a cabin, went on sale for $495,000.

It has since reopened on a seasonal and weekend basis under new ownership and restored with a small gift shop.

== See also ==
- Gravity hill
- Tourist trap
