= Hawks Nest =

Hawk's Nest or Hawks Nest may refer to:

- Hawks Nest, New South Wales, a small coastal village in Australia
- Hawk's Nest (Orange County, New York), a scenic overlook near Port Jervis, New York, US
- Hawks Nest (Sullivan County, New York), a mountain
- Hawks Nest, West Virginia, a recreation area in Hawks Nest State Park near Ansted, West Virginia, US
- Hawk's Nest (novel), a 1941 novel by Hubert Skidmore
- The Hawk's Nest, a 1928 American lost film directed by Benjamin Christensen
