= Halfway House (Ansted, West Virginia) =

- U.S. National Register of Historic Places
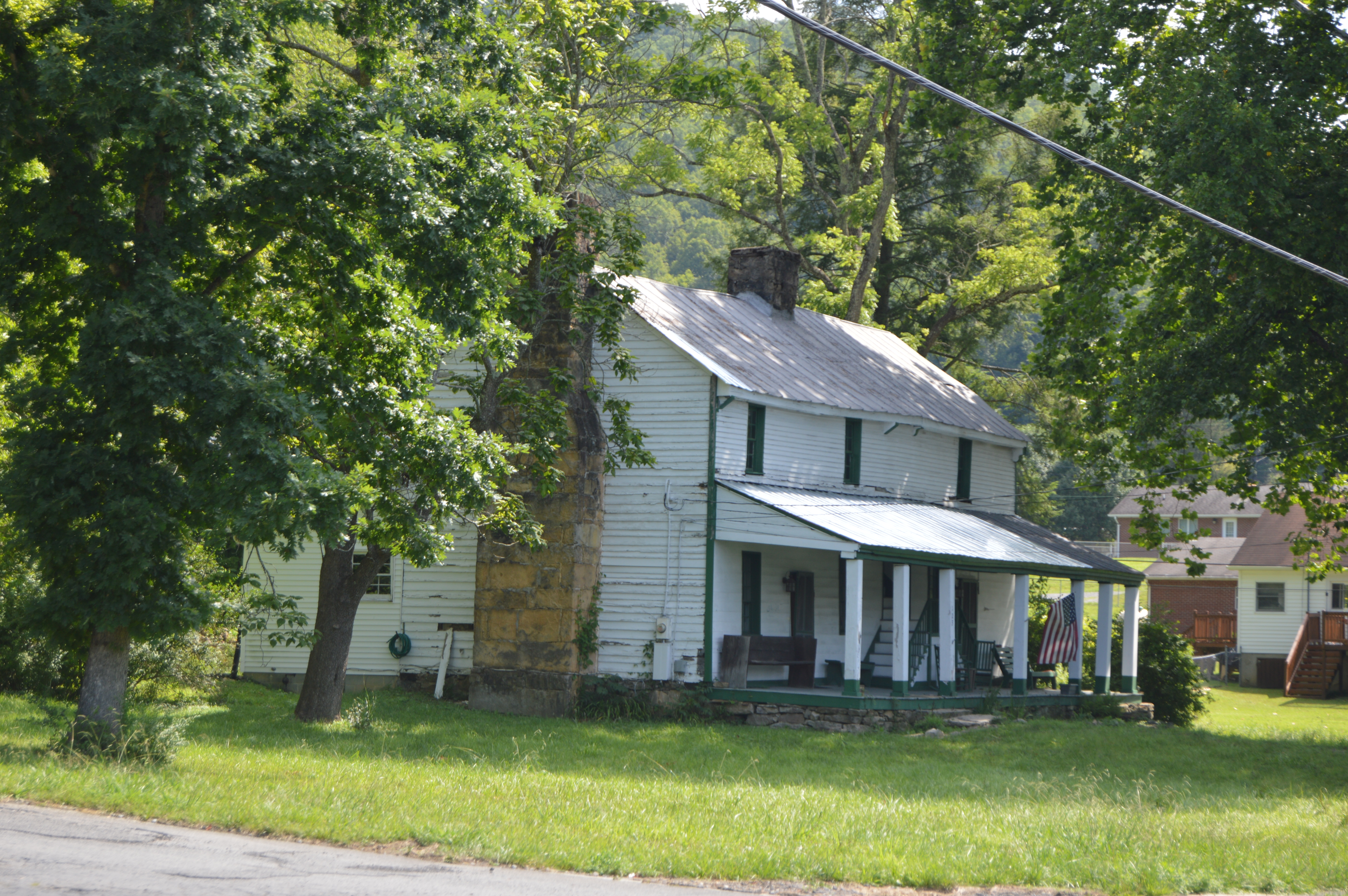
- Western side and front

- Location within West Virginia Location within the United States
- Location: Off old U.S. 60, Ansted, West Virginia
- Coordinates: 38°8′4″N 81°5′43″W
- Area: 1.8 acres (0.73 ha)
- Built: c. 1810
- Architect: Joseph Skaggs
- Architectural style: Log construction
- NRHP reference No.: 78002792
- Added to NRHP: December 18, 1978

Halfway House, also known as the Tyree Tavern, is a historic inn and tavern located at Ansted, Fayette County, West Virginia. It is a two-story, log and frame building with a gable roof measuring 50 feet long and 20 feet deep. The original log section was built prior to 1810. It was expanded to its present configuration about 1827. It served as a stage coach stop on the James River and Kanawha Turnpike. Notable guests included Daniel Webster, Henry Clay, and John Breckenridge. It also was headquarters of the Chicago Gray Dragoons during the American Civil War. It was listed on the National Register of Historic Places in 1978.
