= Midland Highway =

Midland Highway may refer to:

== Australia ==
- Midland Highway (Tasmania)
- Midland Highway (Victoria)

== United States ==
- Midland Highway No. 420, a highway in Oregon
- Midland Trail, a former national auto trail spanning the United States
