= Delaware Lake (New York) =

Lake in Delaware County, New York, United States

- Location of Delaware Lake within New York State
- Interactive map of Delaware Lake
- Location: Delaware County, New York
- Coordinates: 41°53′15″N 75°07′48″W
- Surface area: 23 acres (0.036 mi^{2}; 9.3 ha)
- Surface elevation: 1,706 feet (520 m)
- Settlements: Long Eddy

Delaware Lake is a small lake north of Long Eddy in Delaware County, New York. It drains south via an unnamed creek which flows into Hoolihan Brook. It was once referred to as Perch Pond

== See also ==
- List of lakes in New York
