= Delaware Lake =

Delaware Lake may refer to:

- Delaware Lake (New York), a lake north of Long Eddy in Delaware County, New York
- Delaware Lake (Ohio), a reservoir on the Olentangy River in Delaware County, Ohio

== See also ==
- Lake Delaware, a small reservoir southwest of Bovina Center in Delaware County, New York
