= Ansted, West Virginia =

- Town
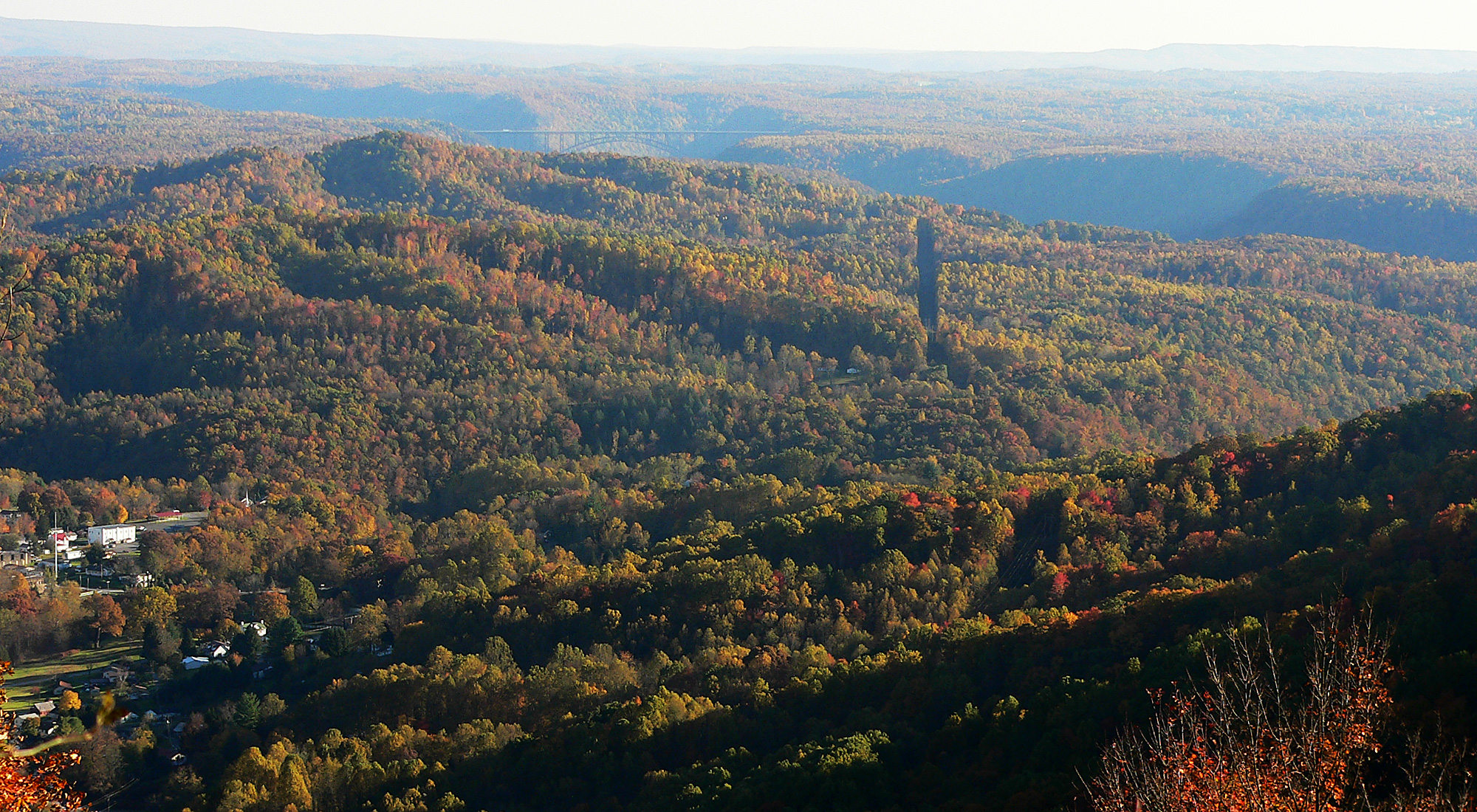
- View from the top of Gauley Mountain, looking over the town of Ansted towards the New River Gorge Bridge nearly six miles away.

- Seal

- Location of Ansted in Fayette County, West Virginia.
- Coordinates: 38°8′10″N 81°6′7″W
- Country: United States
- State: West Virginia
- County: Fayette
- Incorporated: 1891

Government
  - Mayor: R.A. Hobbs

Area
  - Total: 1.66 sq mi (4.31 km^{2})
  - Land: 1.66 sq mi (4.30 km^{2})
  - Water: 0.0039 sq mi (0.01 km^{2})
- Elevation: 1,319 ft (402 m)

Population (2020)
  - Total: 1,303
  - Density: 786.1/sq mi (303.51/km^{2})
- Time zone: UTC-5 (Eastern (EST))
  - Summer (DST): UTC-4 (EDT)
- ZIP code: 25812
- Area code: 304
- FIPS code: 54-01996
- GNIS feature ID: 1534968
- Website: www.townofansted.com

Ansted is a town in Fayette County in the U.S. state of West Virginia. The population was 1,303 at the 2020 census. It is situated on high bluffs along U.S. Route 60 on a portion of the Midland Trail (a National Scenic Byway) near Hawks Nest overlooking the New River far below.

== History ==
=== Native Americans, European settlers, Fayette County ===
The area of what is now southern West Virginia was long a hunting ground for nomadic tribes of Native-Americans before the arrival of Europeans in the 17th century. Around 1790, the area now known as Ansted was settled by a group of Baptists who did not hold legal title to the land. These people were known as "squatters", and built the Hopewell Baptist Church nearby. In 1792, a 400-acre (1.6 km^{2}) tract of land in the area was patented to Charles Skaggs.

Named in honor of the Marquis de la Fayette, a major hero of the American Revolutionary War, Fayette County, Virginia was created in 1831. The first county court was held that same year at Miles Manser's general store which stood nearby Ansted's current location along the James River and Kanawha Turnpike, an early roadway built to connect the canals on the James and Kanawha Rivers. The area was known at that time as Mountain Cove. At various times, it has also been known as Woodville, New Haven, and Westlake.

=== American Civil War ===
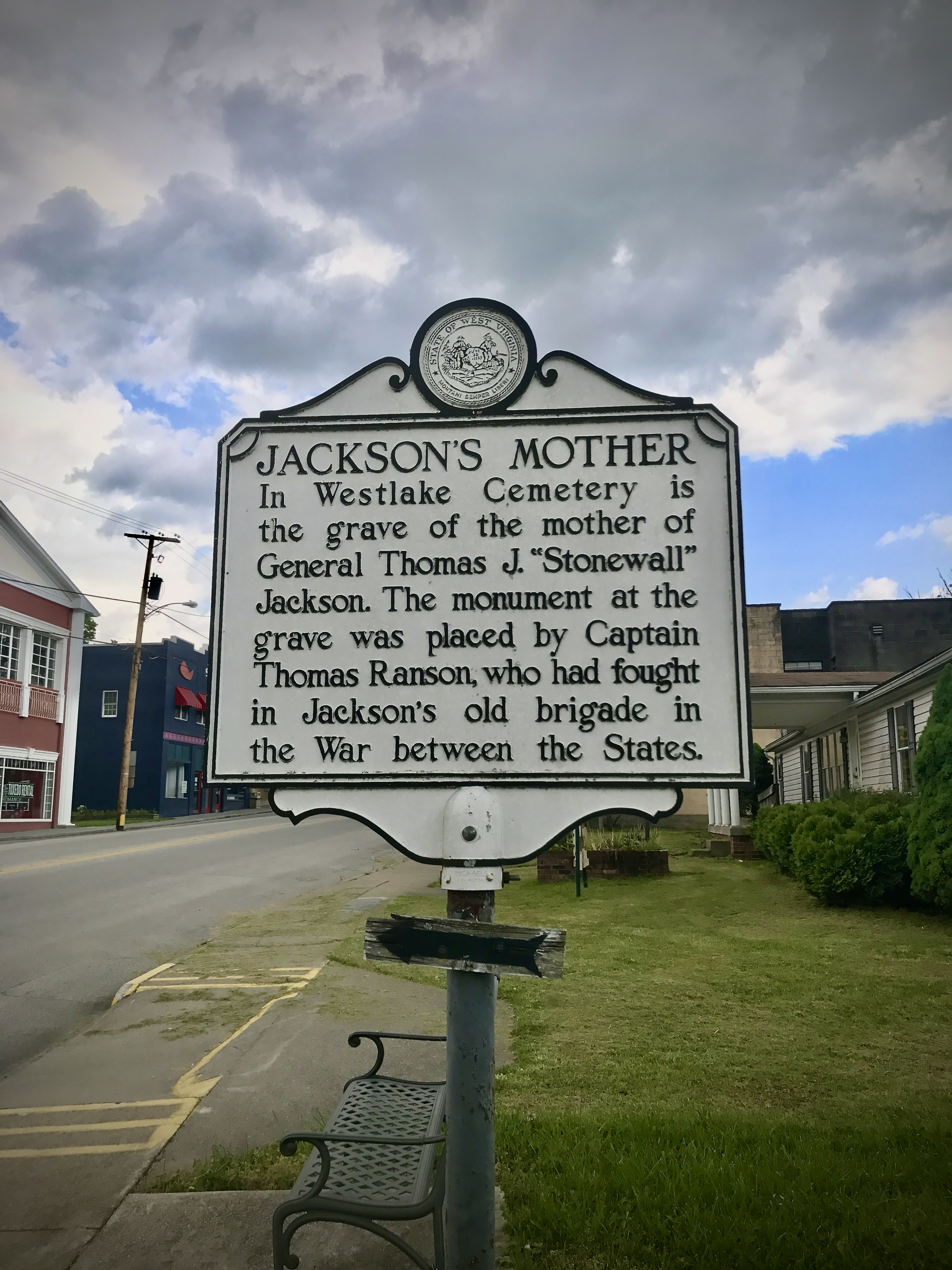
Westlake Cemetery marker on the Midland Trail in Ansted, West Virginia.

During the American Civil War, Fayette County became strategic for both Union and Confederate efforts. Nearby Gauley Bridge, a covered bridge carrying the James River and Kanawha Turnpike, was taken and retaken three times in 1861 and 1862; its spectacular burning was long-remembered in the community. During the winter of 1861–62, the Union Army's Chicago Gray Dragoons (later, Companies H and I of the 12th Illinois Cavalry) made the Halfway House (Tyree Tavern) in what is now Ansted their headquarters. Confederate General Robert E. Lee maintained headquarters on nearby Sewell Mountain, where he first met "Traveller", whom Lee later purchased, becoming his most famous horse. The Chicago Dragoons had a strong religious orientation and ties to Chicago's Young Men's Christian Association (YMCA). Many Union troops felt they were fighting the moral issue of slavery, although many Fayette County citizens had Confederate sympathies and so sent no delegate to the Wheeling Convention. Nonetheless, the area became part of the new State of West Virginia when it was formed in 1863. Local lore includes romances between the local girls and the young soldiers from Illinois. Some couples married, built homes and raised families in the Mountain State after hostilities ended.

=== Post-war: railroads, coal mining, Ansted laid out ===
Around 1872, the Chesapeake & Ohio Railway added a new line, on both sides of the narrow New River valley, creating a through route to the Ohio and Mississippi Rivers. The final spike in this portion of the C&O was placed at Hawks Nest Station, just below Ansted, on January 29, 1873.

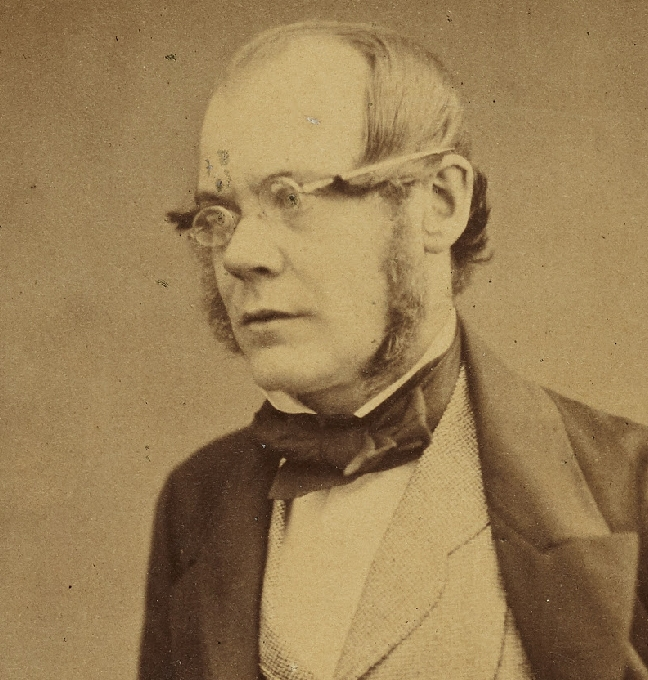
Dr. David T. Ansted, British scientist and geologist (1814–1880)

Also in 1873, the town of Ansted was created and named after British scientist and geologist, Dr. David T. Ansted (1814–1880), who in 1853, mapped out the nearby seams of high grade bituminous coal and once owned the land under the town. Former Confederate Colonel George W. Imboden, a wealthy lawyer from Augusta County, Virginia and brother of Confederate General John D. Imboden (under whom George Imboden fought with the 18th Virginia Cavalry) laid out the town. Imboden had begun speculating in coal lands in southern West Virginia after the war's end, and attracted British investors. Dr. Ansted, a noted geologist, had been engaged to investigate the region's potential for coal deposits, and his report far exceeded Imboden's best expectations. Ansted and Imboden bought more than a thousand acres (4 km^{2}) of coal and timber land on Gauley Mountain between Hawks Nest and the town of Westlake. They organized the Gauley-Kanawha Coal Company, Ltd., in 1872 and in 1873 opened a mine about 1,000 feet (300 m) above the river and 300 feet (91 m) below the summit of Gauley Mountain. The company changed its name to Hawks Nest Coal Company, Ltd., in 1875, and was reorganized in bankruptcy in 1889 as the Gauley Mountain Coal Company.

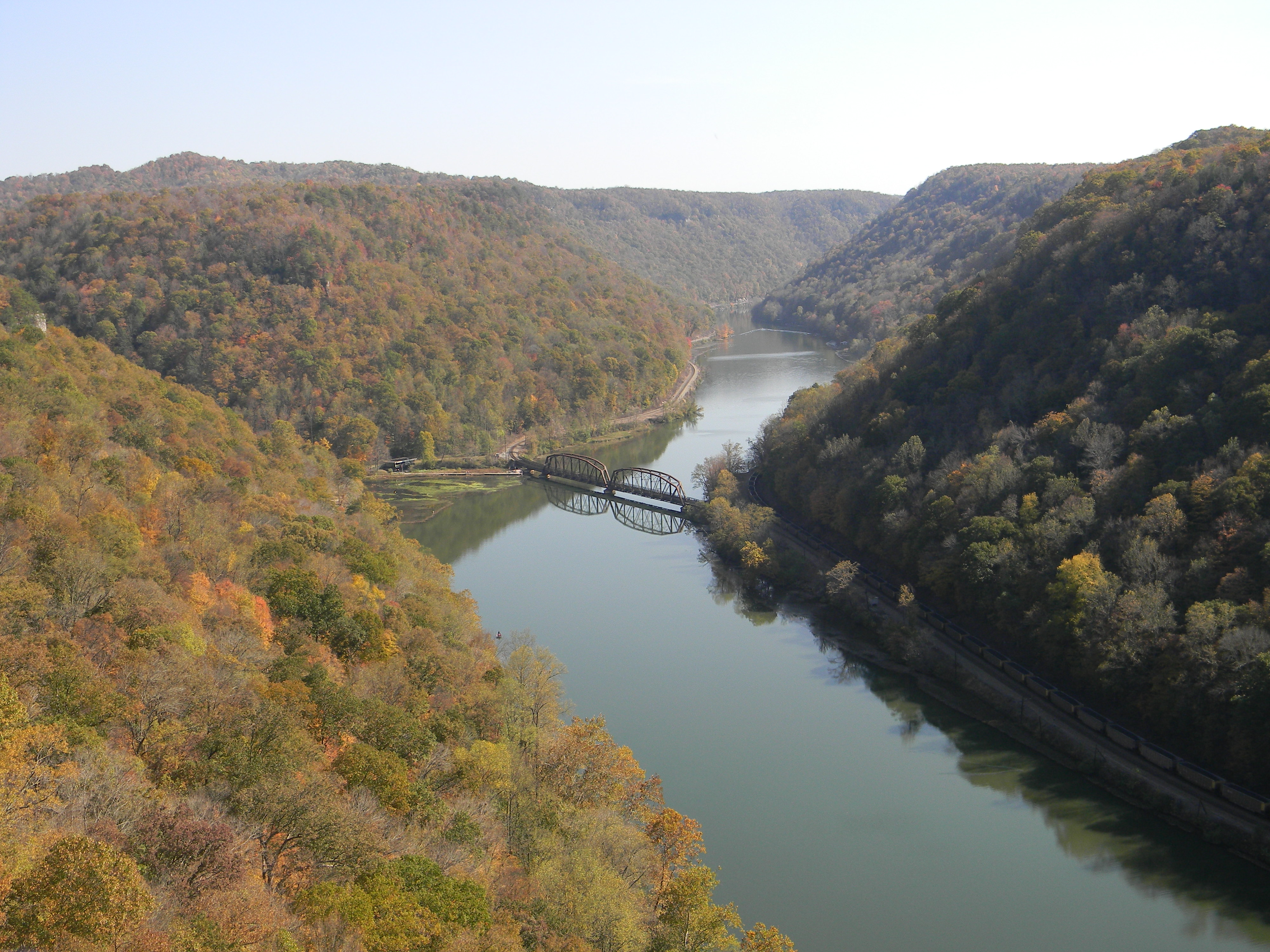
A scenic view of the New River Gorge from Lovers' Leap in Hawks Nest State Park, Ansted, West Virginia

Colonel Imboden, who was Ansted's first mayor, helped stimulate the growth of the town's businesses. His second wife, Angie, renamed their family home "Contentment" because she and her family spent many happy hours there. Contentment had been built about 1830 on the James River and Kanawha Turnpike in the west end of what is now Ansted, and they acquired it in 1872.

Another of the town's more well-known residents was William Nelson Page, (1854–1932). A civil engineer, protégé of Dr. Ansted, and mining manager, Page helped develop West Virginia's rich bituminous coal fields in the late 19th and early 20th century. Page also was co-founder and builder of the Virginian Railway. In 1898, on a knoll in the middle of town, Page had a palatial mansion built by Gauley Mountain Coal Company carpenters, where he and his wife Emma Gilham Page raised their four children. Like Colonel Imboden, William Page also served as Ansted's mayor for 10 years, although his title of "Colonel" was honorific (despite post-war involvement in the West Virginia State Militia). The railroad towns of Page and Pageton in West Virginia were named for him.

=== Railroad to tunnel disaster to tourism ===
Ansted had railroad service from 1874 until 1972. In 1874, mine owners had a narrow-gauge railroad built from Hawks Nest Station up the ravine of Mill Creek. A saddleback locomotive was used. In 1889, the Chesapeake and Ohio Railway (C&O) purchased the narrow-gauge railroad and contracted with William Page to do the work to upgrade the line to standard gauge, which was completed on August 20, 1890.

The (C&O) operated the new branch line, which was known as the Hawks Nest Subdivision, from 1890 until 1972. It connected with the New River Subdivision main line at Hawks Nest Station and consisted of 3.44 miles (5.54 km) of line to and beyond the town of Ansted. The line had one of the steepest grades of any C&O branch, a 4.17% grade. C & O did not want to transport passengers on the line, but the State of West Virginia ordered it to do so as a condition of licensing. The company appealed to the United States Supreme Court, which in Chesapeake & Ohio Railway Company v. Public Service Commission of State of West Virginia, 242 U.S. 603 (1917), upheld the state's authority. Passenger service then began and continued until some time in the 1930s. The branch line's freight rail service ended in 1972 and the tracks were removed.

Also in the 1930s, developers of hydroelectric power for the Union Carbide plant at Alloy, West Virginia, the Kanawha and New River Power Company, decided to divert the New River through a three-mile tunnel under Hawks Nest. Many of the 3000 workers building the tunnel were asked to mine the silica they encountered for use in steel production. Never given protective equipment (although managers wore protective breathing apparatus during visits), hundreds developed silicosis, some so severe that they died within a year. After congressional hearings, the Hawks Nest Tunnel disaster led to recognition of occupational lung disease as well as compensation legislation, as acknowledged by a historical marker on the site. It also became the subject of several books as well as historical fiction.

Today, the Ansted–Hawks Nest Rail Trail follows the route from the Town of Ansted down the steep mountainside to near Hawks Nest Station in the New River Valley. The trail is 2.2 miles (3.5 km) in length and the aerial tram from Hawks Nest Lodge links to the terminus.

== Historical sites and attractions ==
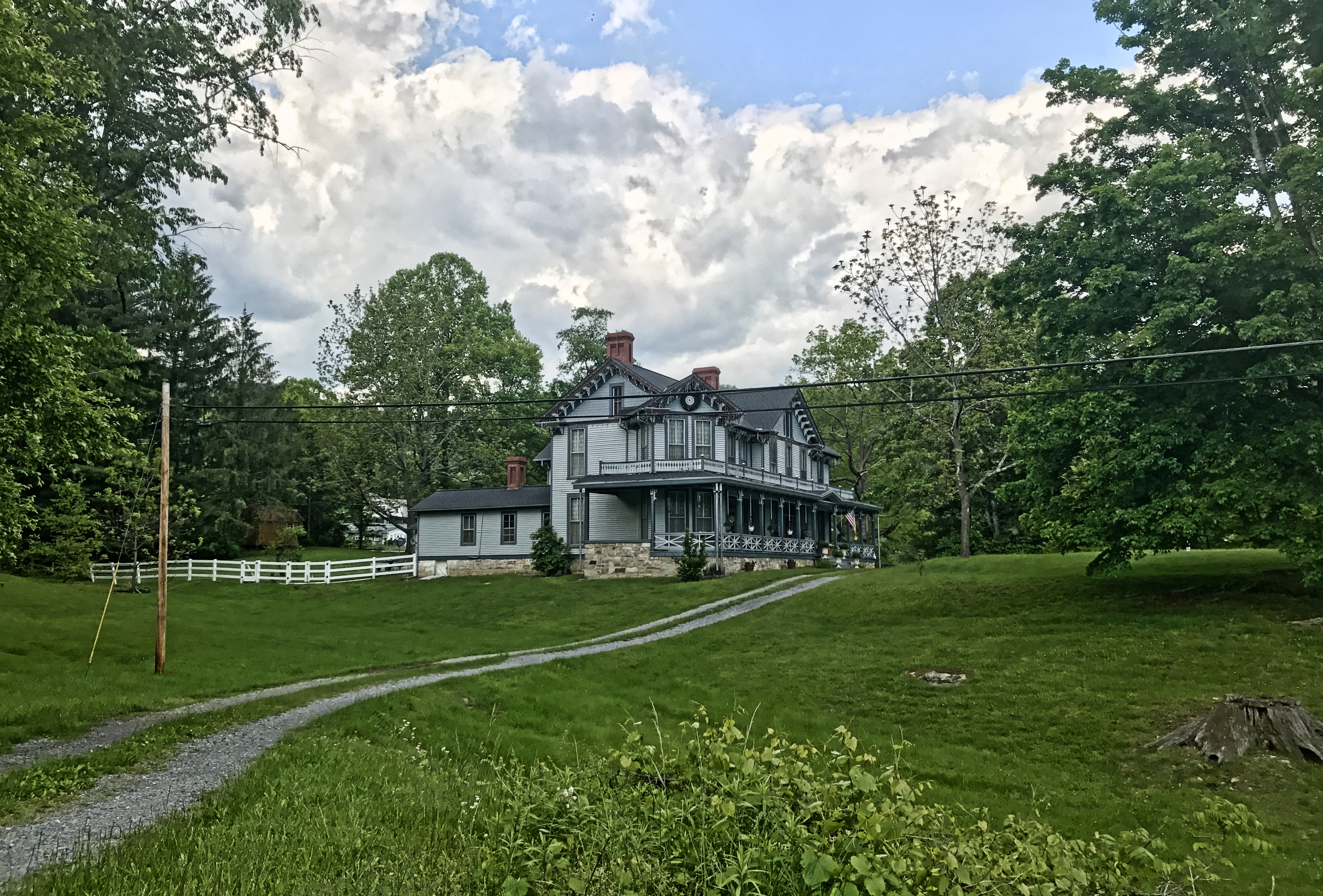
The Page-Vawter House from the Midland Trail.

Angie and George Imboden's 1830 home, Contentment, has become the Contentment Historical Complex, headquarters for the Fayette County Historical Society. It includes a historical museum and restored one-room schoolhouse, furnished as the mid-nineteenth century.

The mansion of William and Emma Page and their family on the hilltop in Ansted also still stands as evidence of the once-thriving coal business. Later occupied by the family of Dr. Gene Vawter, and still in use as a private residence, the Page-Vawter House is listed on the National Register of Historic Places.

Other historical landmarks include the Halfway House, the former Tyree's Tavern which was headquarters of the Chicago Gray Dragoons during the American Civil War, and the African American Heritage Family-Tree Museum, which helps African-Americans trace their roots.

The grave of Julia Neale Jackson, mother of Confederate General Thomas Stonewall Jackson, is located in Westlake Cemetery in Ansted. The marker was placed more than 35 years after her death by Capt. Thomas Davis Ranson, one of the soldiers of the Stonewall Brigade, to mark his troops' affection for their fallen leader.

Ansted has the distinction of having Hawks Nest State Park located within its borders. The park at Hawks Nest features a small museum and gift shop, an aerial tram ride to the New River Gorge, and spectacular overlooks including the famous "Lover's Leap".

U.S. Route 60 threads through the community as part of the Midland Trail, a National Scenic Byway.

Ansted hosts the Country Roads Festival each September and the Festival of Lights over the Christmas holiday season, a time when the Fayetteville theater produces an annual holiday play. Ansted also hosted annual Street Luge PRO-AM in the late 1990s, a competition on the largest hill in the area, Gauley Mountain. The course was a mile long with a 90 degree turn at the base of the mountain. The Mystery Hole is a attraction where mysterious things are said to happen such as making brooms stand on their bristles year round.

In the early 2000s the county's largest flagpole and American Flag was built in the town, which added in 2007 a war memorial through donations, that has the name, rank, and period served of some local military veterans.

== Geography ==
Ansted is located at 38°8′10″N 81°6′7″W (38.136029, -81.101951). According to the United States Census Bureau, the town has a total area of 1.67 square miles (4.33 km^{2}), of which 1.66 square miles (4.30 km^{2}) is land and 0.01 square miles (0.03 km^{2}) is water.

== Demographics ==
Historical population
Census	Pop.	Note	%±
1900	1,090		—
1910	1,030		−5.5%
1920	1,178		14.4%
1930	1,404		19.2%
1940	1,422		1.3%
1950	1,543		8.5%
1960	1,511		−2.1%
1970	1,511		0.0%
1980	1,952		29.2%
1990	1,643		−15.8%
2000	1,576		−4.1%
2010	1,404		−10.9%
2020	1,303		−7.2%
U.S. Decennial Census

=== 2010 census ===
As of the census of 2010, there were 1,404 people, 589 households, and 395 families living in the town. The population density was 845.8 inhabitants per square mile (326.6/km^{2}). There were 697 housing units at an average density of 419.9 per square mile (162.1/km^{2}). The racial makeup of the town was 96.7% White, 2.7% African American, 0.2% Native American, 0.1% from other races, and 0.3% from two or more races. Hispanic or Latino of any race were 0.9% of the population.

There were 589 households, of which 26.1% had children under the age of 18 living with them, 49.1% were married couples living together, 13.8% had a female householder with no husband present, 4.2% had a male householder with no wife present, and 32.9% were non-families. 30.1% of all households were made up of individuals, and 16.3% had someone living alone who was 65 years of age or older. The average household size was 2.29 and the average family size was 2.80.

The median age in the town was 47 years. 19.6% of residents were under the age of 18; 6.4% were between the ages of 18 and 24; 21.5% were from 25 to 44; 29.2% were from 45 to 64; and 23.2% were 65 years of age or older. The gender makeup of the town was 47.2% male and 52.8% female.

=== 2000 census ===
As of the census of 2000, there were 1,576 people, 631 households, and 436 families living in the town. The population density was 940.3 inhabitants per square mile (362.2/km^{2}). There were 708 housing units at an average density of 422.4 per square mile (162.7/km^{2}). The racial makeup of the town was 96.13% White, 3.17% African American, 0.13% Native American, and 0.57% from two or more races. Hispanic or Latino of any race were 0.51% of the population.

There were 631 households, out of which 31.2% had children under the age of 18 living with them, 50.4% were married couples living together, 14.7% had a female householder with no husband present, and 30.9% were non-families. 29.2% of all households were made up of individuals, and 17.1% had someone living alone who was 65 years of age or older. The average household size was 2.40 and the average family size was 2.95.

In the town, the population was spread out, with 23.1% under the age of 18, 9.1% from 18 to 24, 23.7% from 25 to 44, 24.4% from 45 to 64, and 19.7% who were 65 years of age or older. The median age was 41 years. For every 100 females, there were 85.4 males. For every 100 females age 18 and over, there were 80.9 males.

The median income for a household in the town was $25,028, and the median income for a family was $28,938. Males had a median income of $25,682 versus $17,500 for females. The per capita income for the town was $15,671. About 20.7% of families and 23.0% of the population were below the poverty line, including 31.5% of those under age 18 and 14.4% of those age 65 or over.

== Notable people ==
- Sheriff Blake, Major League Baseball pitcher
- Tom Pridemore, legislator and football player
