= Gould Pond =

Lake in Delaware County, New York, United States

- Location of Gould Pond within New York
- Location: Delaware County, New York
- Coordinates: 41°54′18″N 75°07′16″W
- Primary inflows: Hoolihan Brook
- Primary outflows: Hoolihan Brook
- Basin countries: United States
- Surface area: 1 acre (0.40 ha)
- Surface elevation: 1,654 ft (504 m)
- Settlements: Long Eddy

Gould Pond is a small lake located north-northeast of Long Eddy in Delaware County, New York. Hoolihan Brook flows through Gould Pond.

== See also ==
- List of lakes in New York
