= Lover's Leap =

Common toponym

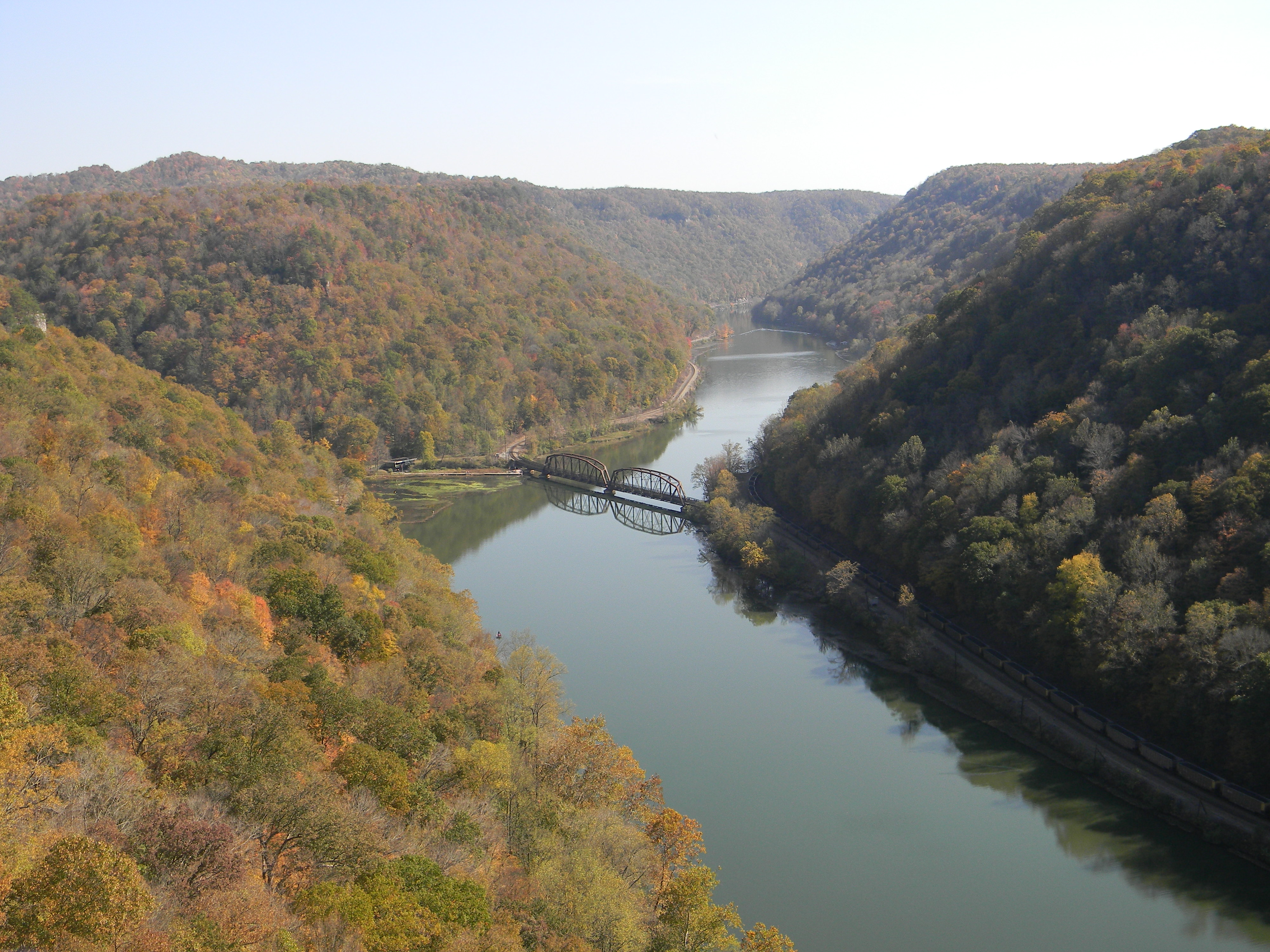
A scenic view of the New River Gorge from Lovers' Leap at Hawk's Nest State Park, Ansted, West Virginia

Lover's Leap, or (in plural) Lovers' Leap, is a toponym given to a number of locations of varying height, usually isolated, with the risk of a fatal fall and the possibility of a deliberate jump. Legends of romantic tragedy are often associated with a Lover's Leap.

== List of locations ==
=== In the United States ===
- Bluff Park, Hoover, Alabama
- Lovers Leap, DeSoto Caverns, Childersburg, Alabama
- Lovers' Leap, Tombigbee River Mile 96, Jackson, Alabama
- Noccalula Falls Park, Gadsden, Alabama
- Lovers Leap, Green Forest, Arkansas
- Lovers' Leap, Greenwood, Arkansas
- Lovers Leap, Levesque, Arkansas
- Lovers Leap, Knights Ferry, California, alongside California Highway 120
- Lover's Leap, Lake Tahoe, California
- Quincy, California, off Buck's Lake Road
- Vail, Colorado, name of a run on Blue Sky Basin
- Lovers' Leap Bridge and State Park, New Milford, Connecticut
- Lover's Leap, Yonah Mountain, Georgia
- Rock City, a roadside attraction in Lookout Mountain, Georgia

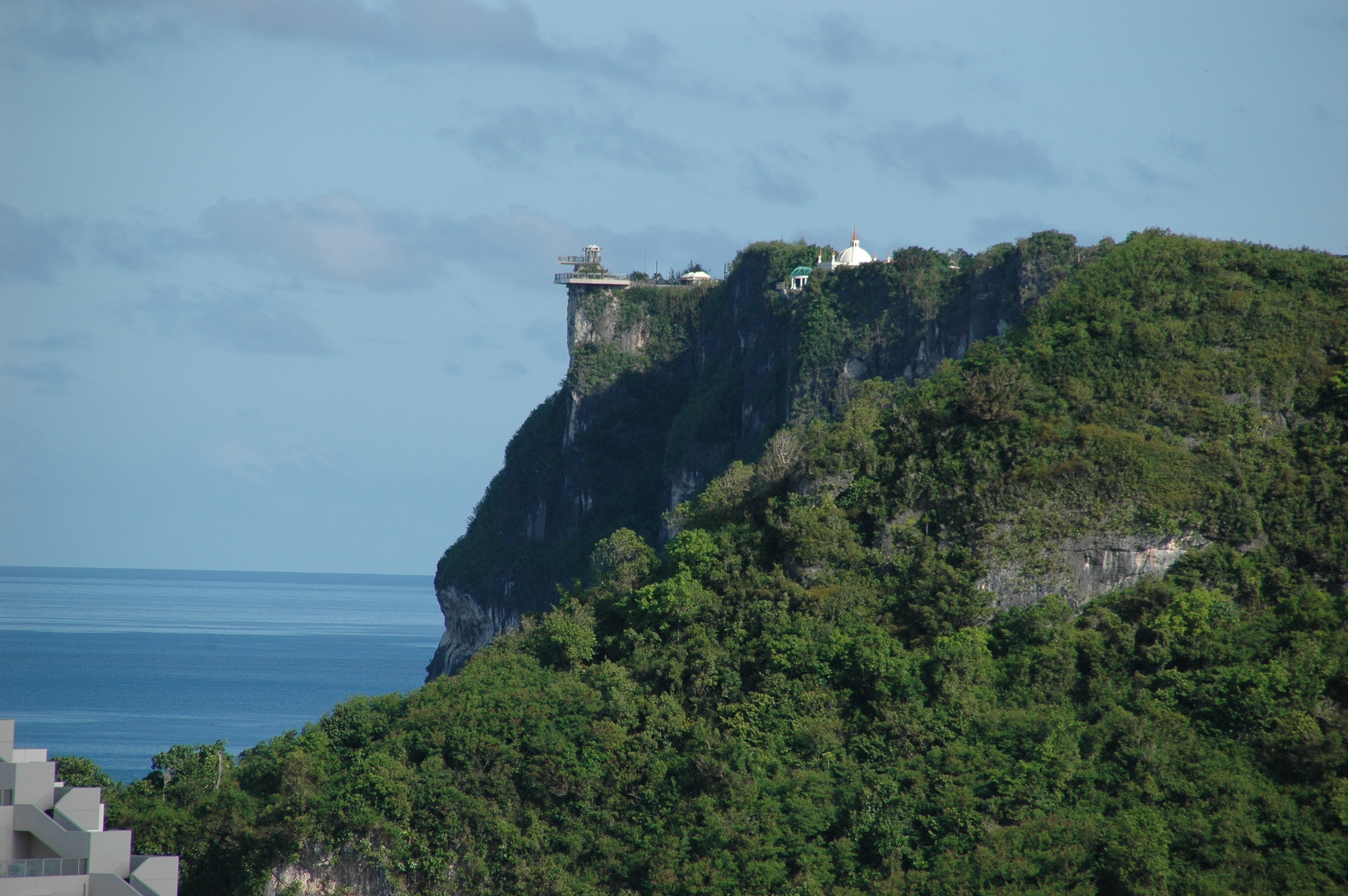
Two Lovers Point is a major tourist attraction on Guam

- Two Lovers Point (Puntan dos Amantes) in Dededo, Guam
- Spirit Lake, Idaho
- Lover's Leap Pere Marquette State Park, Grafton, Illinois
- Lover's Leap, Franklin Creek State Natural Area, Franklin Grove, Illinois
- Starved Rock State Park, Illinois
- Lover's Leap, Carrsville, Kentucky
- Lover's Leap, Mammoth Cave National Park, Edmonson, Hart, and Barren counties, Kentucky
- Lovers' Leap, Natural Bridge State Resort Park, Slade, Kentucky
- Lovers' Leap, Bangor, Maine
- Cumberland Narrows, Maryland
- Purgatory Chasm State Reservation, Massachusetts
- Lover's Leap, Hannibal, Missouri
- Lover's Leap, The Palisades, Weehawken, New Jersey
- Philmont Scout Ranch, outside Cimarron, New Mexico
- Blowing Rock, North Carolina
- Lover's Leap, Hot Springs, North Carolina
- Lover's Leap, located along Oklahoma State Highway 10 and the Illinois River in Tahlequah, Oklahoma
- Eagles Mere, Pennsylvania
- Lover's Leap Trail, in Custer State Park, Custer, South Dakota
- Lovers' Leap, in Cameron Park, Waco, Texas
- Lover's Leap, in Lynn, Massachusetts
- Lover's Leap, in Washington County, Utah
- Lovers' Leap in Patrick County, Virginia, about 10 miles (16 km) west of Stuart on U.S. Highway 58
- Natural Tunnel State Park, Duffield, Virginia
- Lovers' Leap, Turn Point, Stuart Island, Washington
- Lovers' Leap Hawks Nest State Park, Fayette, West Virginia
- Maiden Rock, Wisconsin
- Whitetop Mountain, Washington County, Virginia

=== Elsewhere ===
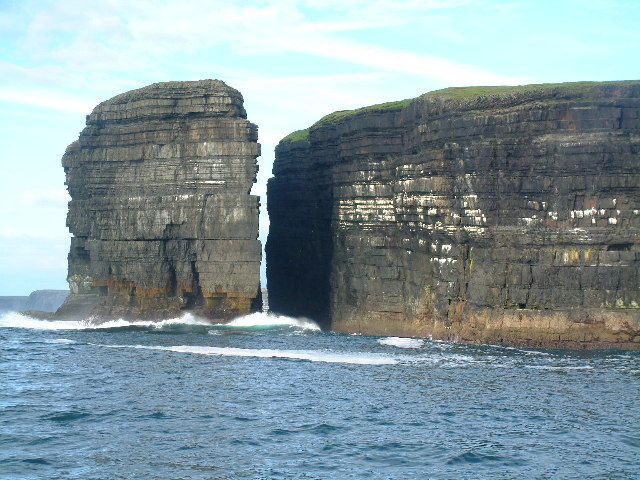
Diarmuid and Gráinne's Rock / Lovers's Leap - Loop Head, Clare, Ireland

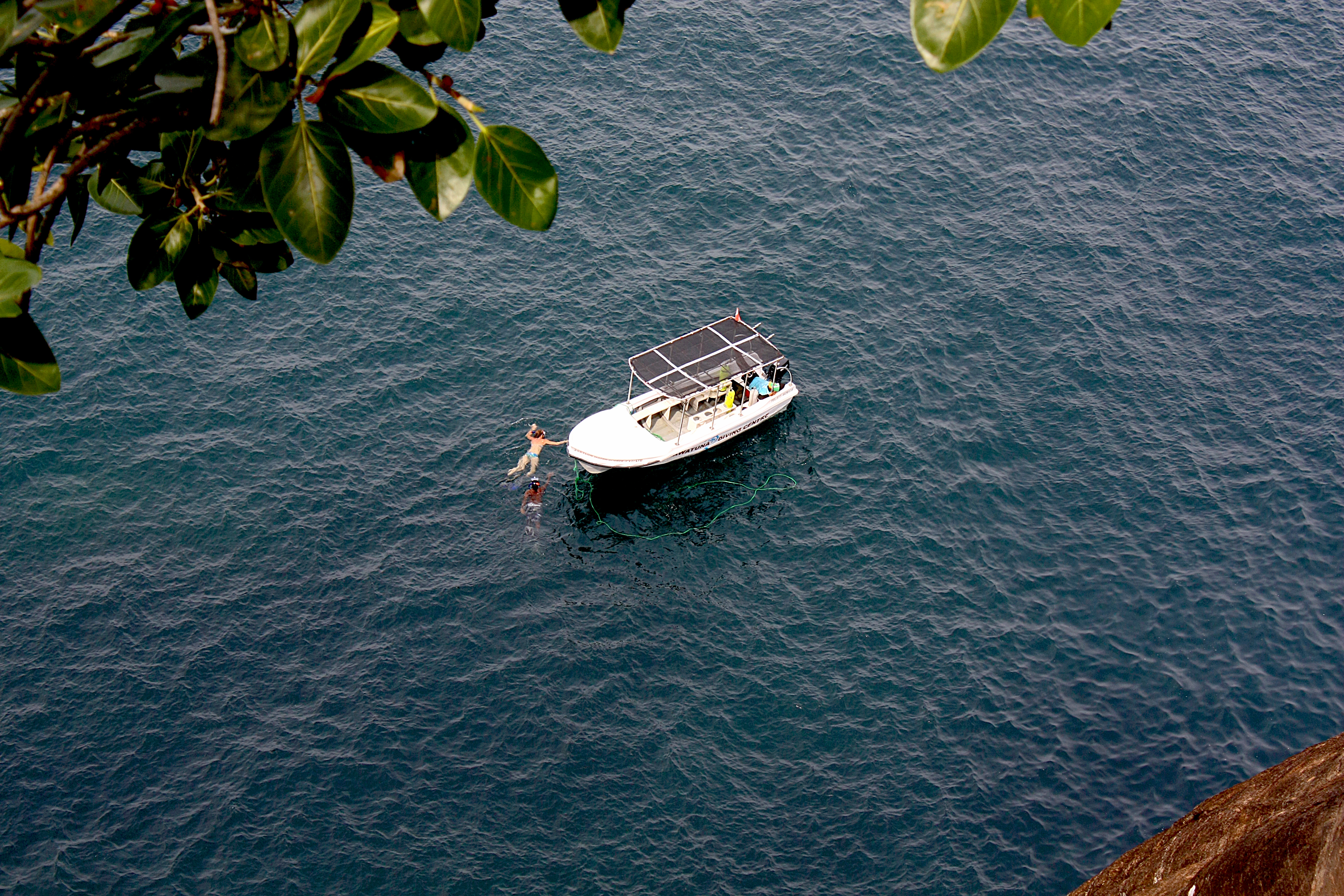
Couple approaching boat after they swim in lover's leap spot, Trincomalee

- Fonte dos Amores, Poços de Caldas, Minas Gerais, Brazil
- Elora Gorge, Elora, Ontario, Canada
- La piedra feliz, Valparaíso, Chile
- Đulin Ponor, Ogulin, Croatia
- Green Valley View a.k.a. Suicide Point, Kodaikanal, India
- Lovers' Leap Rock, Dargle Valley, Bray, County Wicklow, Ireland
- Lovers' Leap / Diarmuid and Gráinne's Rock, Loop Head, County Clare, Ireland
- Salto degli Sposi (Spouses' Jump), Presolana Pass, on the border between the provinces of Bergamo and Brescia, Italy. In 1871, a young couple of Polish artists, musician Maximilian Prihoda and painter Anna Stareat, moved in the area. For unknown reasons, one day, they spent the afternoon on the rock, where Prihoda composed his last melody and Stareat painted her last landscape, and then jumped into the gorge below.
- Lovers' Leap, Saint Elizabeth, Jamaica
- Lovers Leap, Otago Peninsula, Dunedin, New Zealand
- Lovers' Rock (la Peña de los Enamorados), Antequera, Andalusia, Spain
- Lovers' Leap, Trincomalee, Sri Lanka
- Lovers' Leap, Blaise castle estate, Bristol, England, United Kingdom
- Lovers' Leap, Dovedale, Peak District, England, United Kingdom
- Albion Falls, Hamilton, Ontario

== Legends ==
=== United States ===
The Lovers' Leap at Hawks Nest State Park in the town of Ansted, West Virginia, along the historic Midland Trail, has a drop of 585 feet (178 m) from a high cliff overlooking the New River Gorge. The promontory was named "Lovers' Leap" by settlers, and has acquired a legend involving two young Native Americans from different tribes. The most notable Native American legend can be found in Lookout Mountain, Georgia.

Blowing Rock Mountain, outside Blowing Rock, North Carolina, has a similar legend of a young lover leaping from the cliff and instead of plunging to his death, is saved. In this version the lover is saved by the blowing wind which sends him back into the arms of his sweetheart.

Wills Mountain has a Lovers' Leap overlooking Cumberland Narrows on the west side of Cumberland, Maryland. It is 1,652 feet (504 m) above sea level and made up of oddly squared projections of rock from its top all the way down to the National Road (U.S. Route 40) below. The city of Cumberland and the surrounding states of Pennsylvania and West Virginia may be seen from this point.

Mark Twain in Life on the Mississippi writes: "There are fifty Lover's Leaps along the Mississippi from whose summit disappointed Indian girls have jumped." Princess Winona is one such legend, in which the daughter of a Dakota chief leaps to her death rather than marry a suitor she does not love. Maiden Rock, Wisconsin, is one site for the Winona legend, though other locations include Winona Falls in Pennsylvania, Camden County, Missouri, and Cameron Park in Waco, Texas.

=== Other ===
Dovedale in the Peak District in the United Kingdom has a limestone promontory named Lovers' Leap reached by a set of steps built by Italian prisoners of war captured in World War II. The local legend is that a young woman believed her lover had been killed in the Napoleonic Wars, so she threw herself off the top of the promontory. Later, her family found out that her lover was alive and well.

The south coast of Jamaica at Saint Elizabeth Parish has a Lovers' Leap 1,700 feet (520 m) above the Caribbean Sea. Lovers' Leap is named after two enslaved lovers from the 18th century, Mizzy and Tunkey. According to legend, their master, Chardley, liked Mizzy; so, in a bid to have her for himself, he arranged for her lover, Tunkey, to be sold to another estate. Mizzy and Tunkey fled to avoid being separated but were eventually chased to the edge of a large steep cliff. Rather than face being caught and separated, the lovers embraced and jumped over the cliff. The story was used as the basis for a romantic novel.

== See also ==
- List of suicide locations
- Suicide bridge
