= Sam Miller Hill =

Mountain in New York, United States

- Location within New York Adirondack Park Location within the United States

Highest point
- Elevation: 1,824 feet (556 m)
- Coordinates: 41°52′27″N 75°05′17″W, 41°52′42″N 75°05′02″W

Geography
- Location: NE of Long Eddy, New York, U.S.
- Topo map(s): USGS Callicoon, Horton

Sam Miller Hill is a mountain in Sullivan County, New York. It is located northeast of Long Eddy. Cherry Ridge is located west and Hawks Nest is located southwest of Sam Miller Hill.
