= Hawks Nest, West Virginia =

Mountain peak in West Virginia

Coordinates: 38.116934°N 81.115108°W

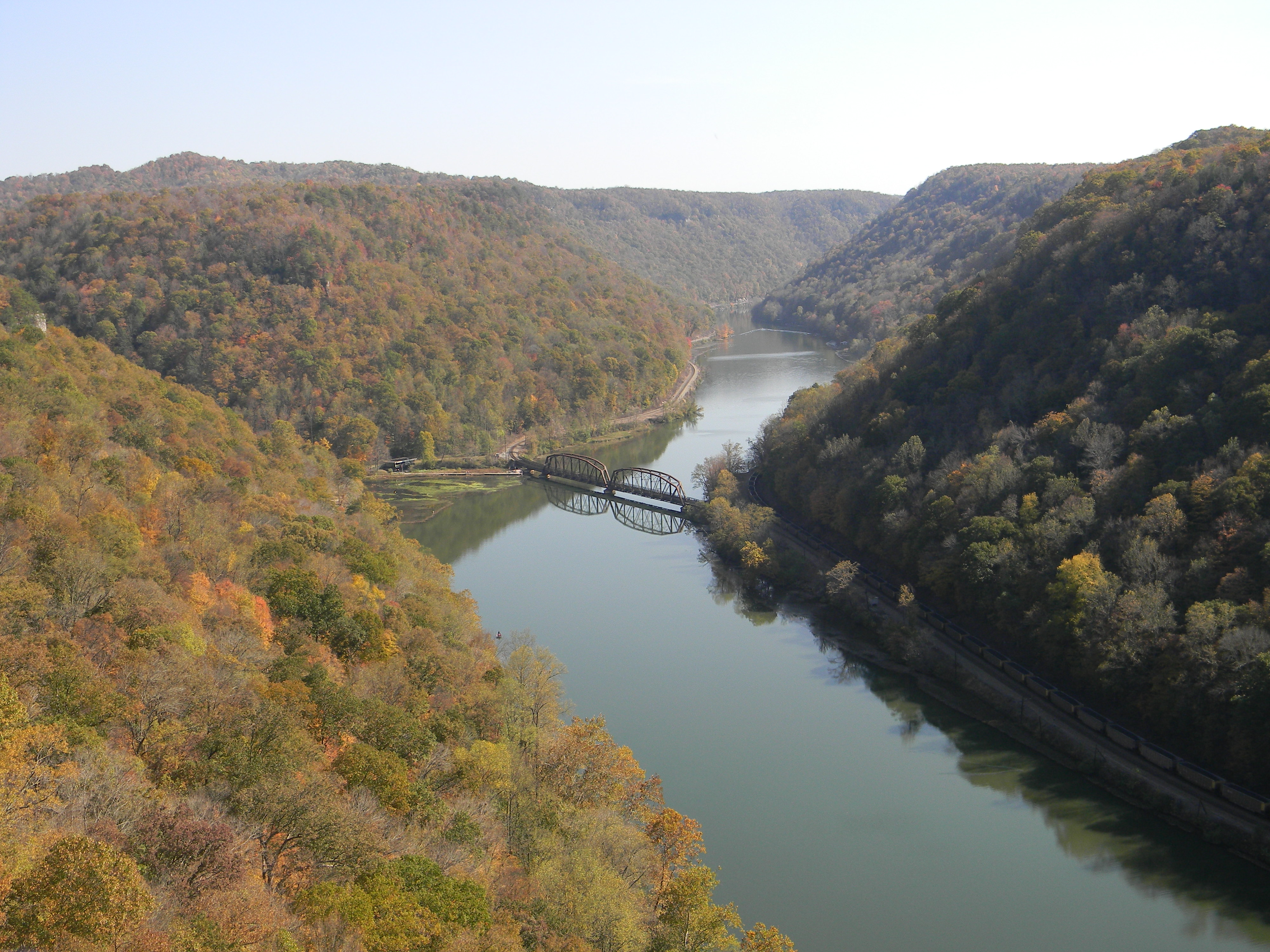
A scenic view of the New River Valley from Lover's Leap, in Hawk's Nest State Park, Ansted, West Virginia

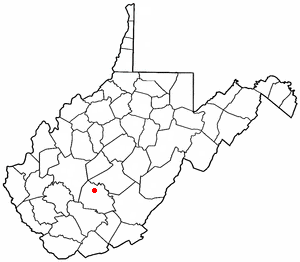
Location of Hawk's Nest

Hawk's Nest, the site of Hawks Nest State Park, is a peak on Gauley Mountain in Ansted, West Virginia, United States. The cliffs at this point rise 585 ft (178 m) above the New River. Located on the James River and Kanawha Turnpike (the road that served as an extension of the canal across what is now West Virginia), many early travelers on this road stopped to see the view of the river below. In modern times, the Midland Trail carries U.S. Route 60 through the same general route. Ample parking at the overlook in the state park provides tourists with free access to the views. English writer Harriet Martineau, who passed through the area in the 1830s, found the view at Hawk's Nest nearly as moving as Niagara Falls. Martineau also reported the legend that John Marshall, as a surveyor in his youth, had been its first white discoverer.

The name Hawk's Nest derived from the many fish hawks which inhabited the massive cliffs at this point. When the railroad began blasting in the area between 1869 and 1873, the hawks left the site and never returned. The Chesapeake and Ohio Railway was completed through the area on January 29, 1873, and a ceremony was held at Hawk's Nest Station.

A hydro-electric project nearby became known as the Hawks Nest Tunnel disaster. During the construction of a three-mile-long tunnel by Union Carbide beginning in 1927, the tunnel was filled with silica dust. Workers were not given masks for protection, even though management wore such masks during the short times they visited for inspection. As a result, thousands of workers, mostly poor and African American, died from silicosis, sometimes as quickly as within a single year.

In addition to the real-life tragedy of the Hawks Nest Tunnel disaster, an overlook in the state park called Lovers' Leap is the location of legendary stories of romantically inspired suicides by young lovers who cannot be together due to family and cultural obstacles.

Hawks Nest State Park offers a nature museum, a nine-hole golf course, a 31-room lodge, jetboat rides and hiking.

== See also ==
- Hawks Nest State Park
- List of West Virginia state parks
- Mystery Hole, a nearby tourist trap
