= Hawks Nest (Sullivan County, New York) =

Mountain in New York, United States

- Location within New York Adirondack Park Location within the United States

Highest point
- Elevation: 1,808 feet (551 m)
- Coordinates: 41°51′52″N 75°06′08″W

Geography
- Location: NE of Long Eddy, New York, U.S.
- Topo map: USGS Callicoon

Hawks Nest is a mountain in Sullivan County, New York. It is located northeast of Long Eddy. Cherry Ridge is located north-northwest and Sam Miller Hill is located northeast of Hawks Nest.
