= Hoolihan Brook =

River in New York, USA

- Location of the mouth of Hoolihan Brook

Location
- Country: United States
- State: New York
- County: Delaware

Physical characteristics
- Source
  - coordinates: 41°54′41″N 75°07′08″W
- Mouth: Delaware River
  - coordinates: 41°50′59″N 75°08′11″W
  - elevation: 817 ft (249 m)

Hoolihan Brook is a river in Delaware County and Sullivan County in New York. It flows into the Delaware River in Long Eddy. Hoolihan Brook flows through Gould Pond.
