= Contentment (Ansted, West Virginia) =

Historic house in West Virginia, United States

- U.S. National Register of Historic Places
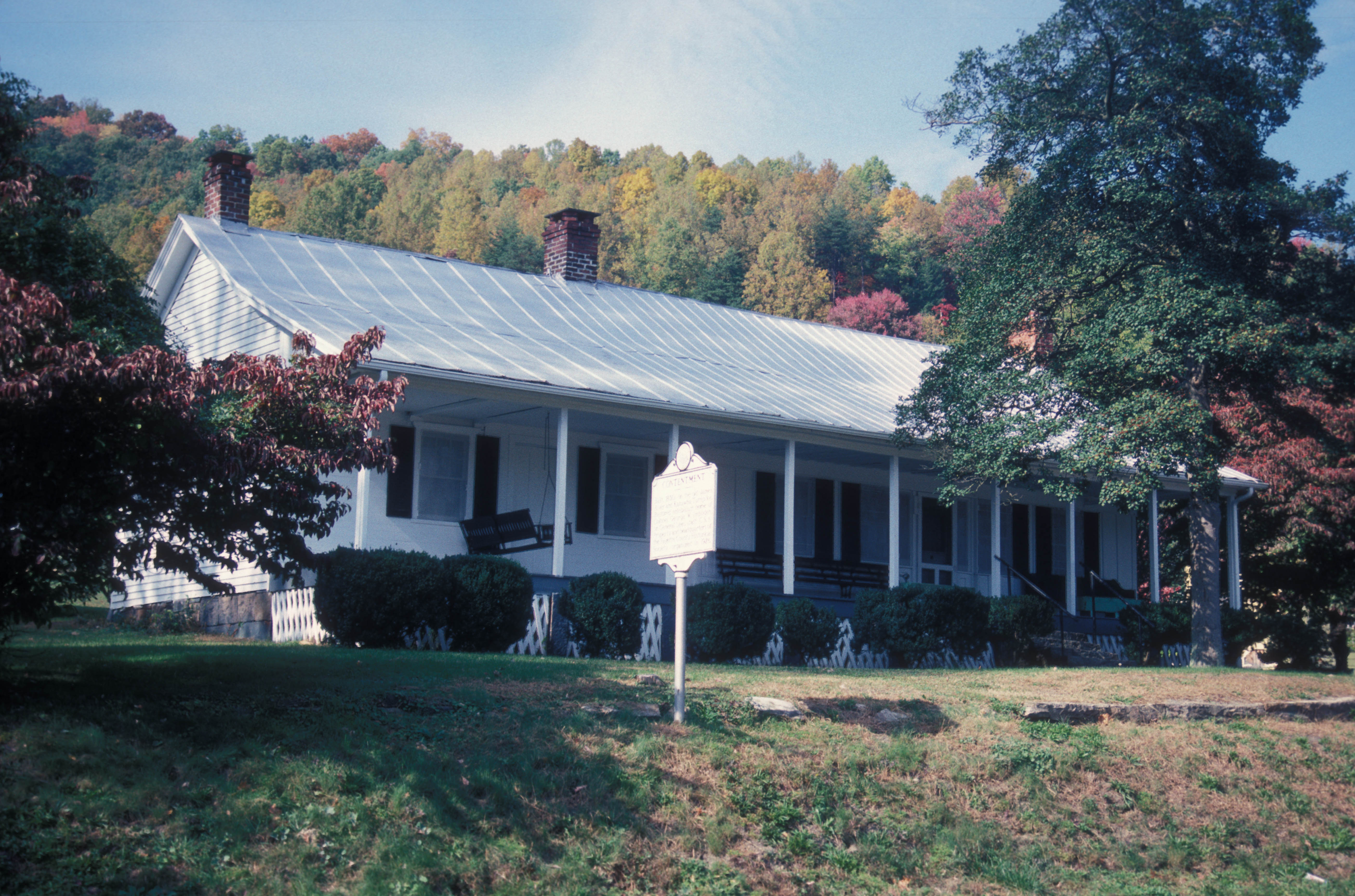

- Location within West Virginia Location within the United States
- Location: Along U.S. 60, Ansted, West Virginia
- Coordinates: 38°8′6″N 81°6′11″W
- Area: 1.2 acres (0.49 ha)
- Built: c. 1830, 1872
- NRHP reference No.: 74001996
- Added to NRHP: December 30, 1974

Contentment, also known as the Colonel George Imboden House, is a historic home located at Ansted, Fayette County, West Virginia. It was built about 1830 and expanded to its present configuration after its acquisition by former Confederate Colonel George W. Imboden in 1872. The original home consisted of five rooms and a detached kitchen. Colonel Imboden added two rooms, extended the porch, and added a gable end chimney. Colonel Imboden, who was Ansted's first mayor, helped stimulate the growth of the town's businesses. The Contentment Historical Complex serves as the museum and headquarters for the Fayette County Historical Society.

It was listed on the National Register of Historic Places in 1974.
