= Sheriff Blake =

American baseball player (1899–1982)

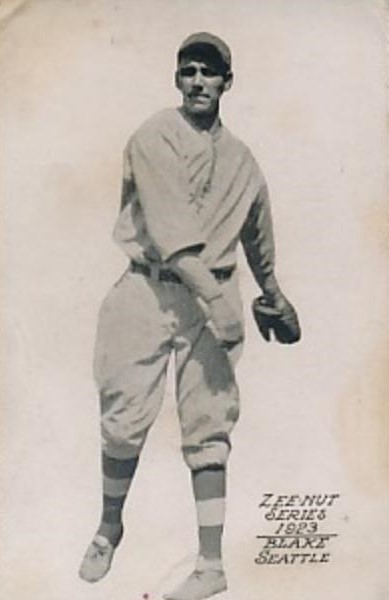
- Pitcher
- Born: September 17, 1899; Ansted, West Virginia, U.S.
- Died: October 31, 1982 (aged 83); Beckley, West Virginia, U.S.
- Batted: Both Threw: Right

MLB debut
- June 29, 1920, for the Pittsburgh Pirates

Last MLB appearance
- September 26, 1937, for the St. Louis Cardinals

MLB statistics
- Win–loss record: 87–102
- Earned run average: 4.13
- Strikeouts: 621
- Stats at Baseball Reference

Teams
- Pittsburgh Pirates (1920); Chicago Cubs (1924–1931); Philadelphia Phillies (1931); St. Louis Browns (1937); St. Louis Cardinals (1937)

John Frederick "Sheriff" Blake (September 17, 1899 – October 31, 1982) was an American pitcher in Major League Baseball from 1920 to 1931 and 1937. He played for the St. Louis Browns, St. Louis Cardinals, Pittsburgh Pirates, Philadelphia Phillies, and Chicago Cubs.

Blake appeared in more than 300 games during his career. His debut in 1920 was not an auspicious one, allowing two runs in an inning of relief for Pittsburgh in a 14–3 defeat to the Cubs.

It took Blake four years to get back to the majors after that season, his last as a Pirate. In 1924, he became a Cub, and in 1925 and 1926 he pitched often but had control issues, finishing second in the National League in walks in 1925 and first the following year. Blake was the Cubs' starting pitcher on Opening Day in 1926. His best season for Chicago came in 1928, when he went 17–11 with an NL-best four shutouts.

Blake had a 14–13 record the next season as the Cubs won the pennant by 10 1/2 games over the nearest rival. He ended up being the losing pitcher in Game 4 of the 1929 World Series even though he pitched to just two batters. Both reached base in a historically bad 10-run seventh inning as the Cubs blew an 8–0 lead to the Philadelphia Athletics, losing the game at Shibe Park 10–8 and then losing the Series two days later.

An inside-the-park three-run homer by Mule Haas, which Cub outfielder Hack Wilson lost in the sun, was a big part of the comeback. Blake then replaced Art Nehf on the mound, gave up consecutive singles to future Hall of Famers Al Simmons and Jimmie Foxx and was lifted. The timing of his two-batter stint stuck Blake with the loss, because he was charged with the run that put the Athletics ahead to stay.

His career lasted until 1937, when he split the season between the two St. Louis clubs, the Browns and Cardinals, but was released by both.

As a hitter in his major league career, Blake posted a .211 batting average (118-for-558) with 46 runs and 30 RBI. Defensively, he recorded a .972 fielding percentage.

Blake was born in Ansted, West Virginia, and he attended West Virginia Wesleyan College. He died in Beckley, West Virginia, in October 1982, aged 83.
