= David T. Ansted =

English geologist and author

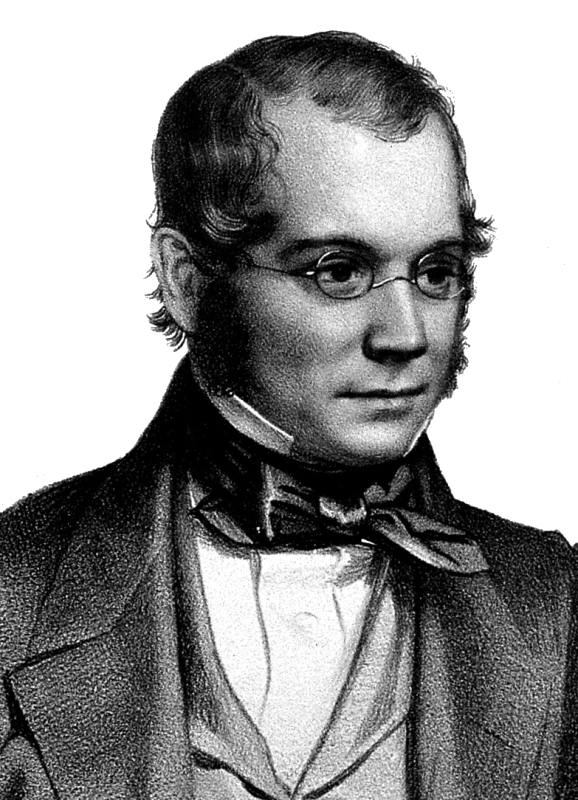
David Thomas Ansted, from an 1850 lithograph by T.H. Maguire.

David Thomas Ansted FRS (5 February 1814 – 13 May 1880) was an English professor of geology and author of numerous books on geology. His role as a teacher at Addiscombe Military Seminary, where future East India Company army officers were trained, had an influence on the study of geology in the colonies.

== Early life and education ==
Ansted was born in London on 5 February 1814 to William Ansted. He was educated at Jesus College, Cambridge, and inspired by Adam Sedgwick took an interest in geology. After taking an M.A. degree in 1839, he was elected to fellow of the college. He was appointed professor of geology at King's College London in 1840, holding the post until 1853. From 1845, he was also a lecturer at the East India Company's Military Seminary at Addiscombe (until its closure in 1861), and professor of geology at the College for Civil Engineers at Putney. His Elementary Course of Geology textbook was awarded as a prize to cadets at Addiscombe. The cadets themselves were posted to India and other colonies where some pursued geology.

He became a fellow of the Royal Society in 1844, and from that date until 1847 he was vice-secretary of the Geological Society. The practical side of geology now came to occupy his attention and he visited various parts of Europe as a consulting geologist and mining engineer.

In 1868, Ansted became an Examiner in Physical Geography to the Science and Art Department of King's College. In 1870 he was awarded a Telford Medal by the Institution of Civil Engineers for his paper "On the Lagoons and Marshes of certain parts of the Shores of the Mediterranean".

== Travel and writing ==
Ansted's Gold-Seekers Manual (1849) attempted to improve the prospects of emigrants to the California gold rush. His other published works include Geology, Introductory, Descriptive, & Practical (1844), The Geologist's Text-Book (1845), Syllabus of Lectures on Mineralogy, Geology, and Practical Geology (1848), An Elementary Course of Geology, Mineralogy, and Physical Geography (1850), The Great Stone Book of Nature (1853), The Applications of Geology to the Arts and Manufactures (1865). He was the co-author with Robert Gordon Latham of The Channel Islands (1862).

By 1853, Ansted's reputation was sufficient that he was hired by potential investors to survey promising coal fields along the New River in southern Virginia in the United States, and he was one of the earlier geologists to identify the rich bituminous coal seams which lay there. Ansted collaborated with numerous scientists of the period and like many others he entered into a correspondence with Charles Darwin in about 1860.

== Personal life ==
Ansted married Augusta Dorothea Hackett (1828-1897), daughter of Alexander Baillie on 24 June 1848 and they had six children. Ansted died at Melton near Woodbridge, Suffolk, on 13 May 1880. He is buried in Kensal Green Cemetery, London.

== See also ==
- William N. Page
- Ansted, West Virginia
- Winding Gulf Coalfield
