= Edwin Randolph Page =

American politician (1846-?)

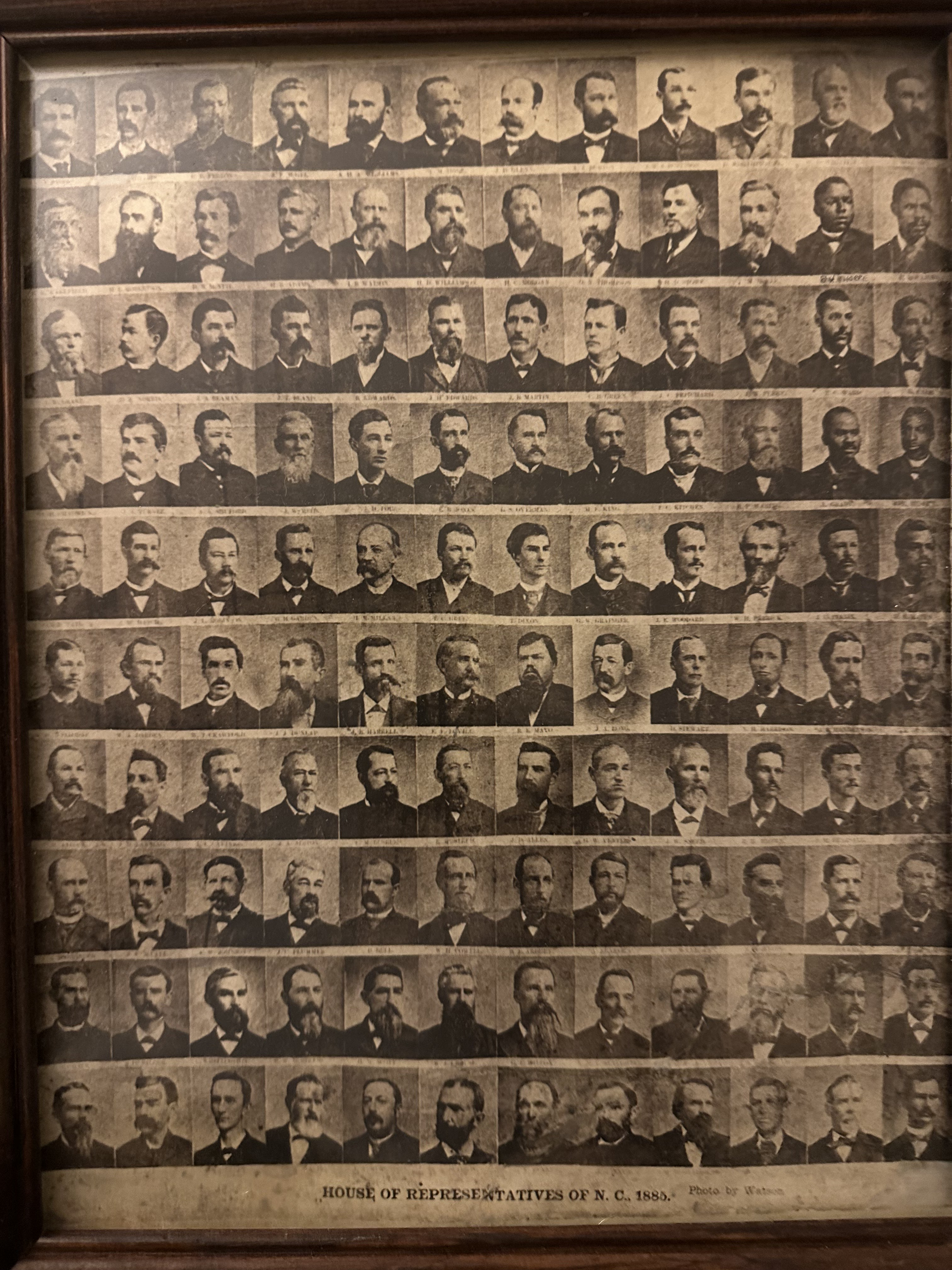
Members of the North Carolina House of Representatives in 1885.

Edwin Randolph Page (September 19, 1846-?) was a train conductor and state legislator in North Carolina. He served during the American Civil War. He was a Republican. In 1881 and 1883 he served in the North Carolina House of Representatives.

== Early life and education ==
He was born in West Point, Virginia, the son of Dr. R. F. Page. He attended Hillsboro Military Institute and Annapolis Naval School.

== Career ==
He "went to sea" and ported in European cities. He served as postmaster of Kinston, North Carolina.

== Personal life ==
He married O. E. McDaniel.
