= James River and Kanawha Turnpike =

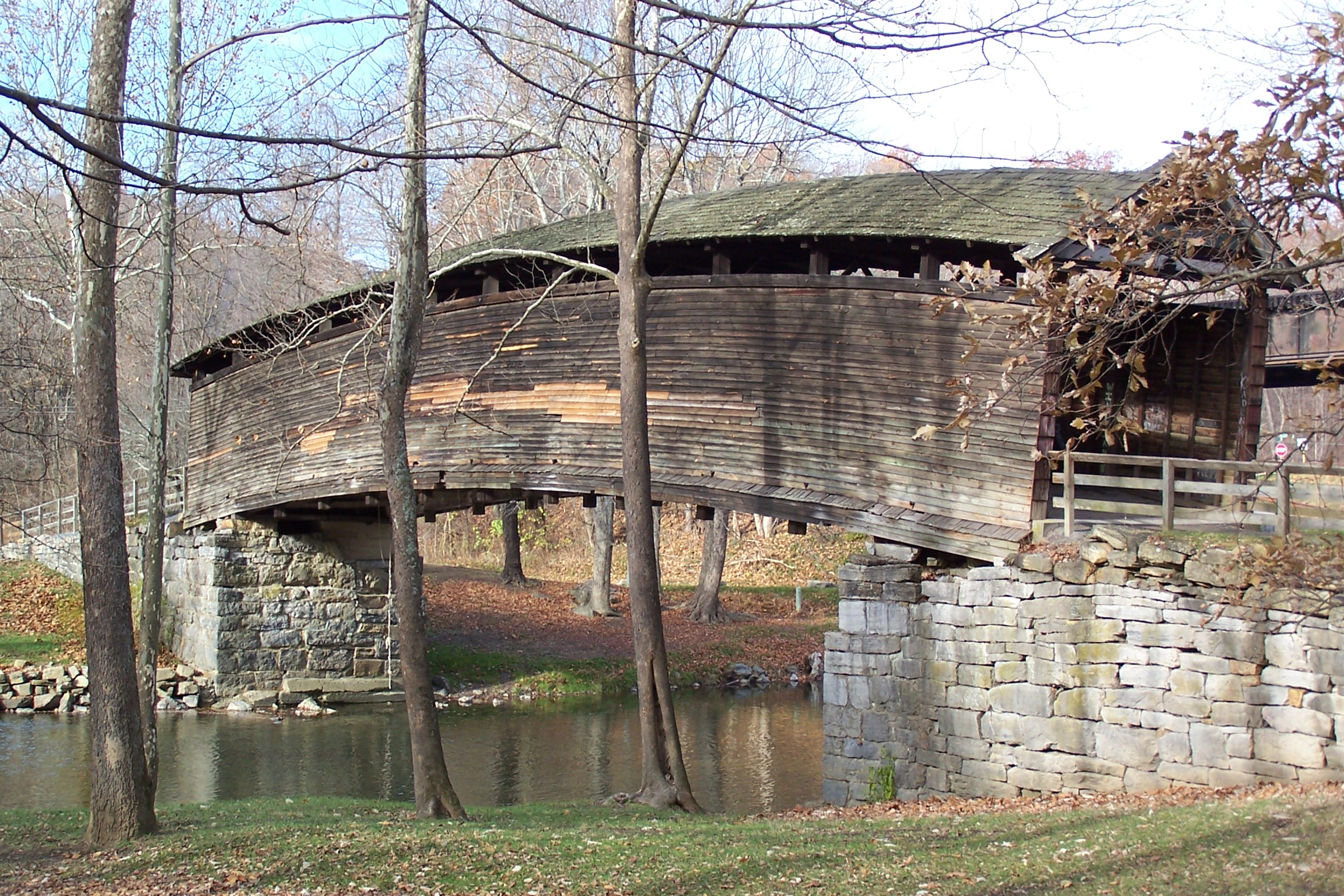
Built in 1835 as part of the James River Kanawha Turnpike, the Humpback Bridge in western Virginia was rebuilt in 1953 and still stands today.

The James River and Kanawha Turnpike was built to facilitate portage of shipments of passengers and freight by water between the western reaches of the James River via the James River and Kanawha Canal and the eastern reaches of the Kanawha River.

The canal and turnpike combination was seen as the key for Virginia to compete with northern states for rich trade to the west. However, the canal portion was an expensive project which failed several times financially, was frequently damaged by floods, and was never fully completed, although sections served for many years. It was largely financed by the Virginia Board of Public Works until after the American Civil War, when funds for continued financial help were not available from the war-torn state or private sources. In 1832, the turnpike was completed to the Ohio River, crossing the Kanawha River at Charleston. In 1873, Collis P. Huntington completed the Chesapeake and Ohio Railway (C&O) from the head of navigation at Richmond, Virginia to the Ohio River at Huntington, West Virginia (named in his honor), and the canal finally succumbed to the competition and the advancing transportation technology of the railroads. In the 1880s, the canal was bought and dismantled by one of the railroads, which built along the towpath and soon became part of the C & O.

== Turnpike today ==
The Turnpike portion of the combination envisioned by Washington remained a major roadway much longer, and was only supplanted by the completion of Interstate 64 (I-64) in 1988. Much of the route of the James River and Kanawha Turnpike through West Virginia is today the Midland Trail, a National Scenic Byway, and is signed as U.S. Route 60 (US 60). Ironically, while the historic road was long a turnpike financed through collection of tolls, today it is a toll-free favorite of shunpikers seeking either an avoidance of tolls on the West Virginia Turnpike, a scenic and bucolic interlude, or both. The name of the roadway is now held by the Kanawha Turnpike, an outer road running parallel to I-64 and Route 60. The road sprouts off US 60 in Charleston, has an intersection with West Virginia Route 601 (WV 601) and separates in the Spring Hill neighborhood of South Charleston.

== Sources ==
- Peyton, Billy Joe (May 29, 2012). "James River & Kanawha Turnpike". e-WV: The West Virginia Encyclopedia.
- Young, Douglas (2003). A brief history of the James River and Kanawaha Turnpike. Virginia Highway & Transportation Research Council.
