= Hawks Nest State Park =

State park in Fayette County, West Virginia

- IUCN category III (natural monument or feature)
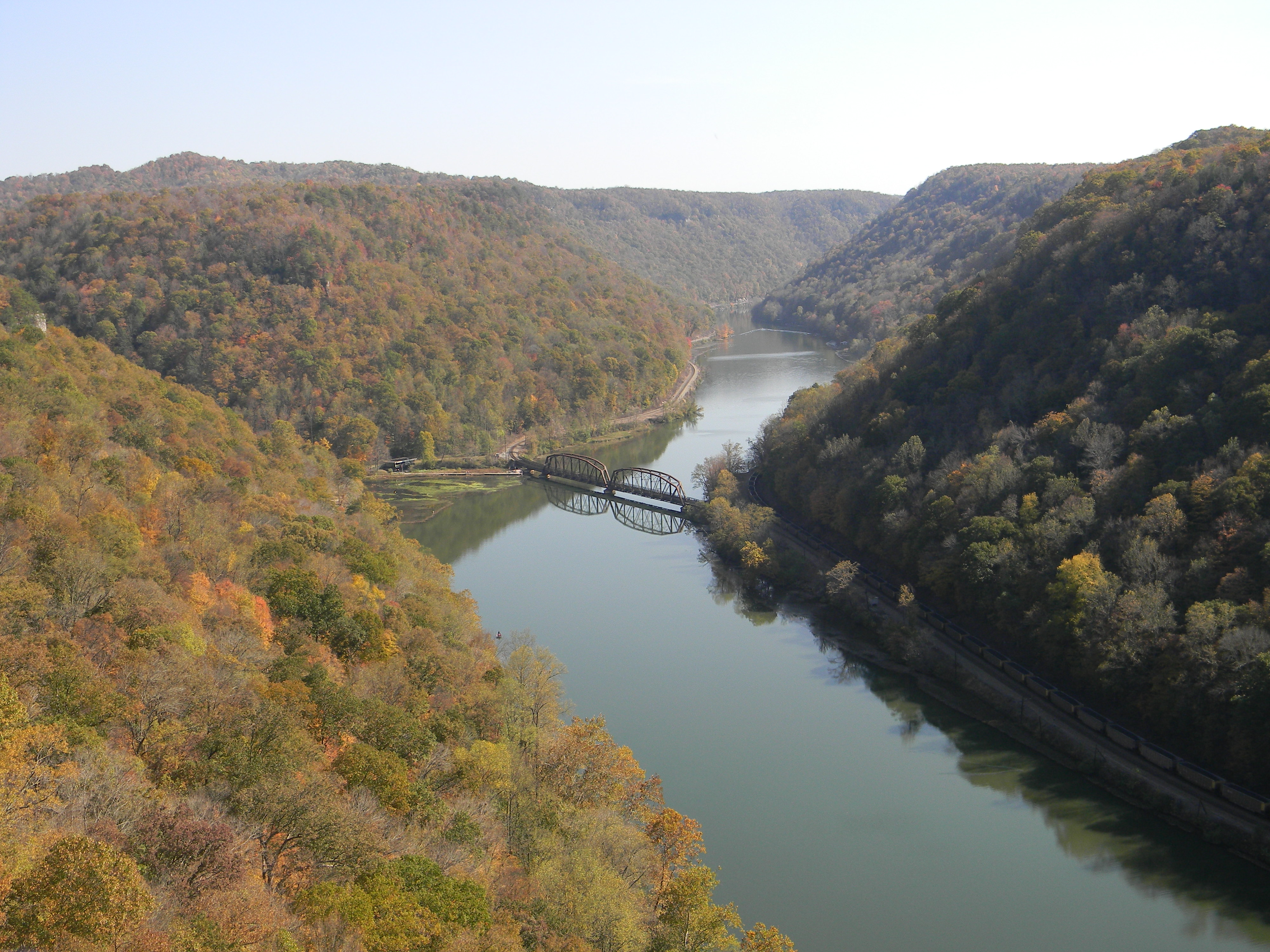
- New River from Hawks Nest

- Location within West Virginia
- Location: Fayette, West Virginia, United States
- Coordinates: 38°07′21″N 81°07′40″W
- Area: 370 acres (150 ha)
- Elevation: 1,257 ft (383 m)
- Established: 1935
- Governing body: West Virginia Division of Natural Resources
- Website: wvstateparks.com/park/hawks-nest-state-park/

Hawks Nest State Park is located on 370 acres (150 ha) in Fayette County near Ansted, West Virginia. The park's clifftop overlook along U.S. Route 60 provides a scenic vista of the New River, some 750 feet (230 m) below. The hydro-electric project tunnel that passes underneath nearby Gauley Mountain was the scene of the Depression-era Hawks Nest Tunnel disaster.

The original building, now a gift shop and museum, was built as a Civilian Conservation Corps (CCC) project. The park lodge was constructed in 1967 by The Architects Collaborative (TAC). The park's lodge and aerial gondola to the river are located about a mile further east from the overlook along U.S. 60, closer to the center of Ansted.

== Features ==
- 31 room lodge
- Restaurant
- Aerial tram between the lodge and the New River shore (currently dismantled)
- Swimming pool
- Hiking trails
- Picnic area
- Gift shop
- River Nature Center
- Hawks Nest Rail Trail (1.8 mile)

== Accessibility ==
Accessibility for the disabled was assessed by West Virginia University. The assessment found the park lodge and facilities to be generally accessible. However, during the 2005 assessment, some issues were identified with a stairway and with some exit lighting.

== See also ==
- Hawks Nest Tunnel disaster
- List of West Virginia state parks
- State park
