= Long Eddy, New York =

- Hamlet
- Location within New York Location within the United States
- Coordinates: 41°51′03″N 75°08′01″W
- Country: United States
- State: New York
- County: Sullivan
- Elevation: 850 ft (260 m)
- Time zone: UTC-5 (Eastern (EST))
  - Summer (DST): UTC-4 (EDT)
- ZIP code: 12760
- Area code: 845
- GNIS feature ID: 955852

Long Eddy is a hamlet in Sullivan and Delaware counties, New York, United States. The community is located along New York State Route 97 and the Delaware River in the westernmost corner of the county, 10.4 miles (16.7 km) southeast of Hancock. Long Eddy has a hotel/bar with outdoor barbecue, a historical society, fire station, Catholic Church, public free river landing on the Delaware River as well as a post office with ZIP code 12760.
