= Midland Trail =

U.S. auto trail

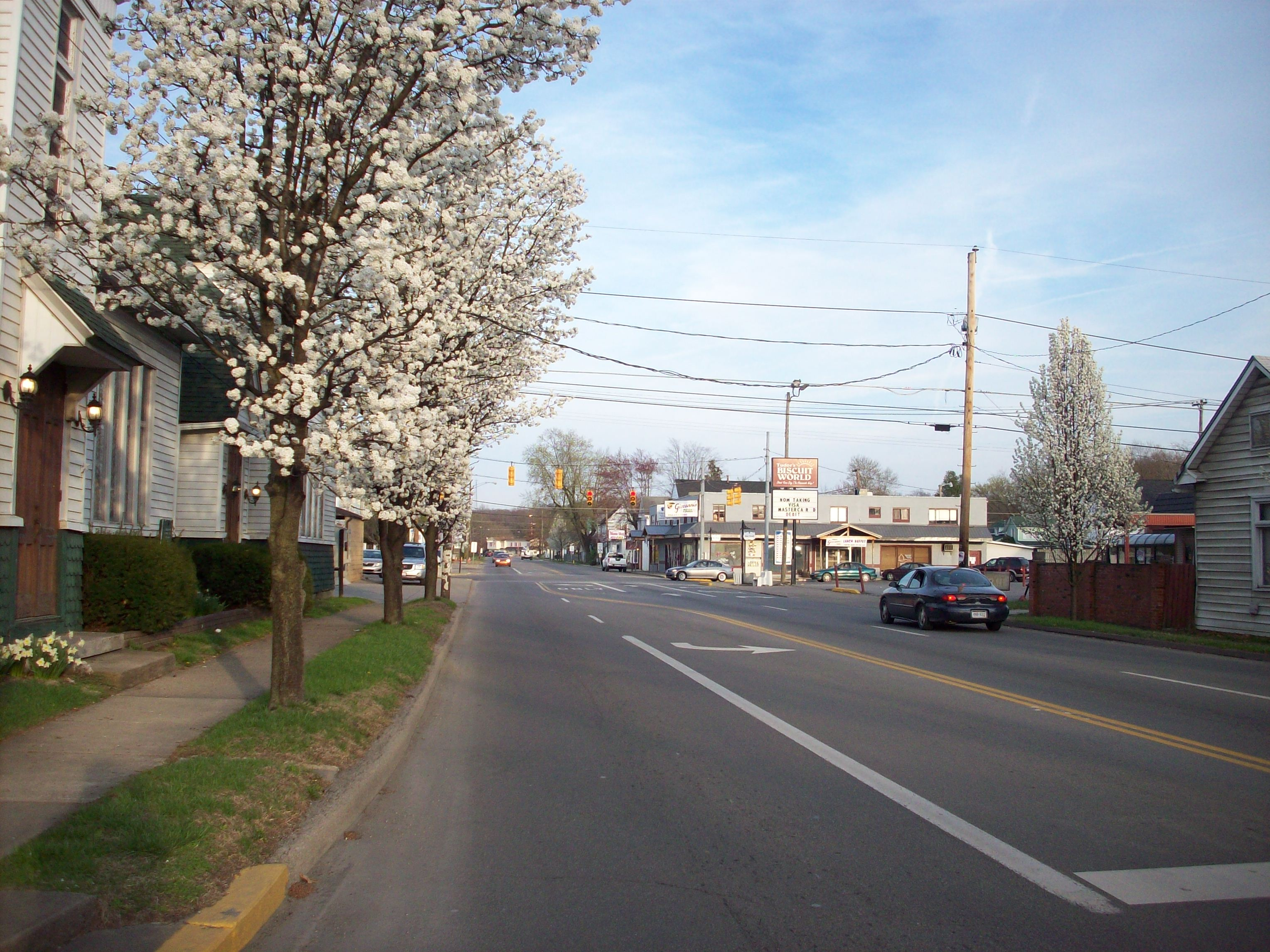
The Midland Trail in Ceredo, West Virginia.

The Midland Trail, also called the Roosevelt Midland Trail, was a national auto trail spanning the United States from Washington, D.C., west to Los Angeles, California and San Francisco, California (though the Lincoln Highway guide published in 1916 states the original eastern terminus was in New York City). First road signed in 1913, it was one of the first, if not the first, marked transcontinental auto trails in America.

== Early routing ==
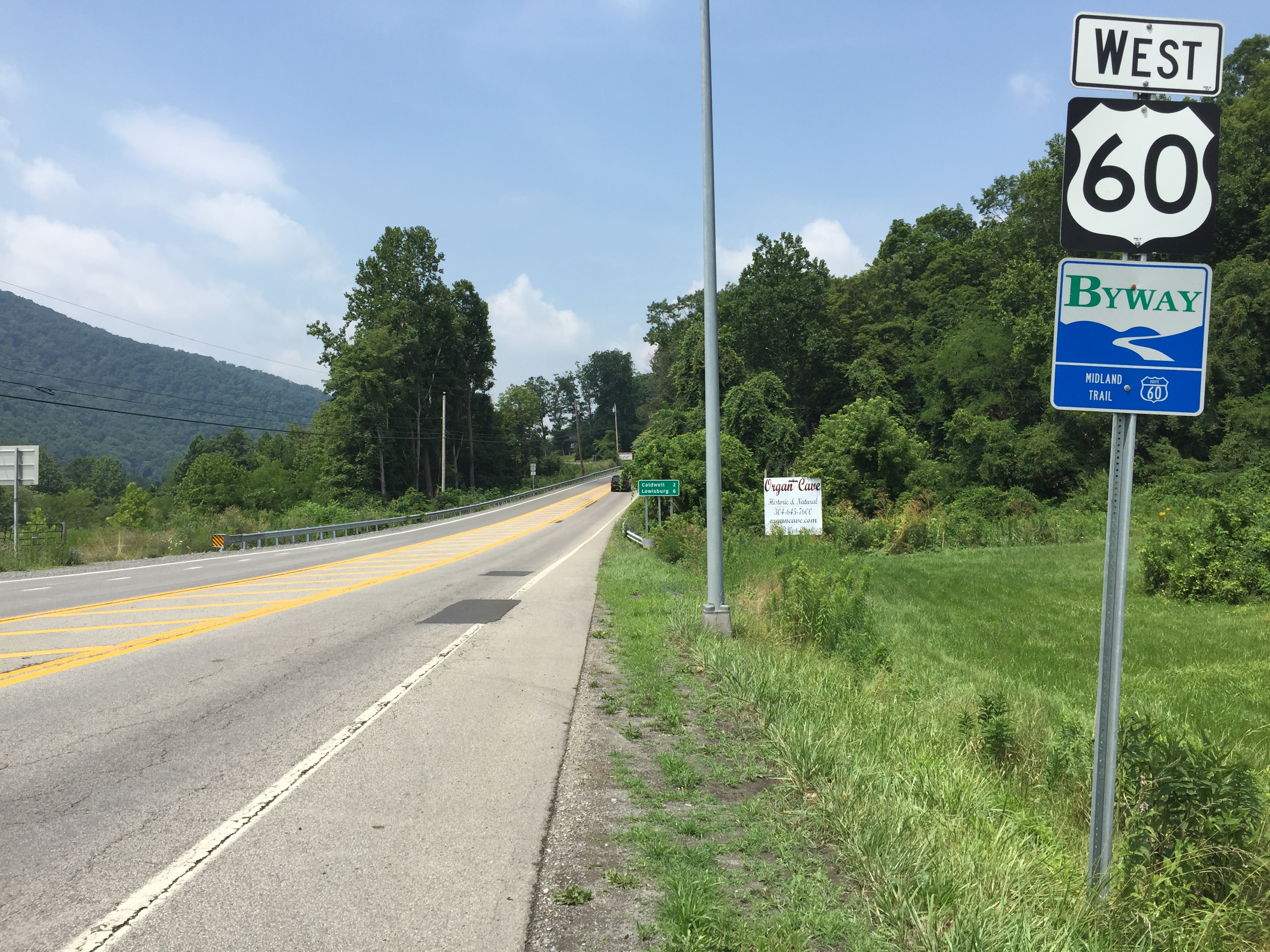
View west along the Midland Trail departing White Sulphur Springs, West Virginia. Note signage indicating the Midland Trail

The early routing of the Midland Trail, from east to west, began in either New York City or Washington, D.C., and continued through Richmond and Clifton Forge, Virginia to Charleston, West Virginia, and passed on through Morehead, Kentucky, to Lexington, Kentucky; Louisville, Kentucky; Vincennes, Indiana; Salem, Illinois; St. Louis, Missouri; Sedalia, Missouri; Kansas City, Missouri, and Topeka, Kansas; to Limon, Colorado, and then on to Denver, Colorado.

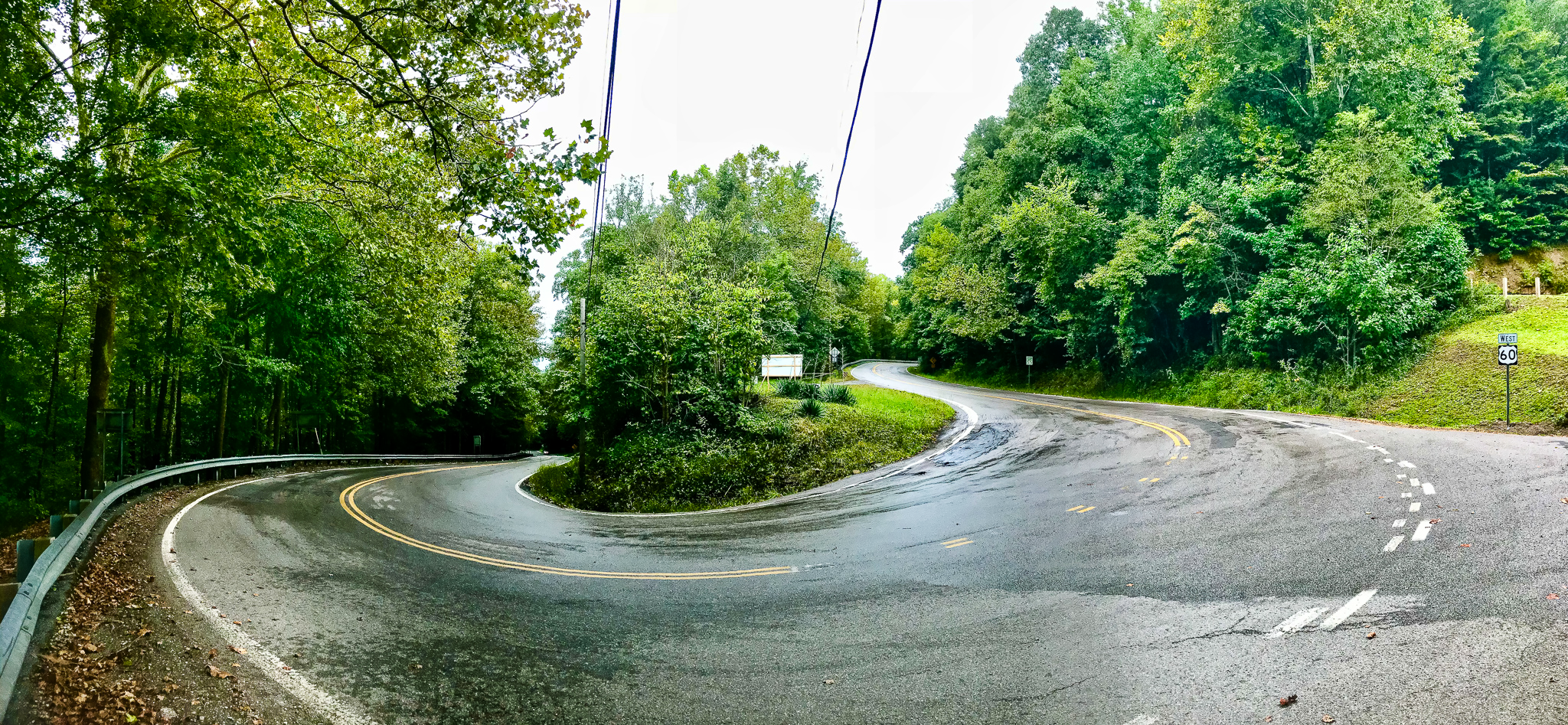
"Devils Elbow" near Hawks Nest State Park in Fayette County, West Virginia.

From Denver, the original routing split several ways to cross the rockies via Berthoud Pass, Tennessee Pass, Cochetopa Pass, and Monarch Pass. All routings converged in Grand Junction, Colorado and continued into Utah through Green River, Utah and Salt Lake City. Past Salt Lake City, the routing moved southward across the Salt Lake Desert on the same routing as the Lincoln Highway through Iosepa, Utah, Orr's Ranch, Fish Springs Ranch, and Ibapah, Utah.

This part of the route was never popular, the state favoring the Victory Highway routing to the north, which is the basic alignment later followed by Interstate 80, and is now largely inaccessible as it is part of the Dugway Proving Grounds. In central Nevada, the highway continued across the Great Basin Desert through Ely and Tonopah then turning south at Goldfield in the Amargosa Desert and then west into California at Lida and over the Inyo Mountains and White Mountains through Westgard Pass.

At the junction in Big Pine, California in the Owens Valley, the original routing then split into four options:

- The first through Mammoth Lakes, Mono Lake, Yosemite, and Stockton to San Francisco.
- The second through Bridgeport, California, Lake Tahoe, and Placerville to Sacramento and then San Francisco.
- The third south through Independence and Mojave in the Mojave Desert, and then west through Tehachapi Pass to the San Joaquin Valley, and then northward through Merced and Modesto to San Francisco.
- The fourth continuing southward from Mojave through Willow Springs to Los Angeles. By the time the Automobile Club of Southern California had prepared their 1917 map of the state, the fourth routing, through Mojave and Willow Springs to Los Angeles, had become the main routing for the Midland Trail in California.

== Realignment ==
Following a major realignment of the route and assumption into the state highway system around 1922, the main Midland Trail alignment in California bypassed early stagecoach-era stops at Freeman and Willow Springs and at the Neuralia railroad siding, and now routed through Red Rock Canyon to Mojave. The earlier alignment took a high line route to the west in the Sierra Nevada and Scodie Mountains foothills around it following the Los Angeles Aqueduct route past Jawbone Canyon, thence following the Southern Pacific railroad tracks through Rosamond and Lancaster and on to Los Angeles, following the route that was later assigned to U.S. Route 6—the Sierra Highway) in 1937.

Various alignments of this portion of the trail followed the late 19th century Twenty-mule team roads built to haul gold from the Cerro Gordo Mines across the Mojave Desert. and roads built for the early 20th century construction of the Los Angeles Aqueduct.

== Routing ==
Using the present road names, the highway approximately used the following route:

- U.S. Route 60, Newport News, Virginia, to Richmond, Virginia
- U.S. Route 1, State Route 54 (Virginia), U.S. Route 33, State Route 22 (Virginia), and U.S. Route 250, Richmond to Staunton, Virginia
- Two alternate routes – U.S. Route 11 and U.S. Route 60 or State Route 42 (Virginia), State Route 39 (Virginia), and U.S. Route 220, Staunton to Covington, Virginia
- U.S. Route 60, Covington to Louisville, Kentucky
- U.S. Route 150 and U.S. Route 50, Louisville to Kansas City, Missouri
- K-10 (Kansas) and U.S. Route 24, Kansas City to Limon, Colorado
- U.S. Route 40, Limon to Denver, Colorado
- U.S. Route 40, Denver, former Colorado State Highway 11 (1923), (Kremmling, Colorado-Wolcott, Colorado), U.S. Route 6, and U.S. Route 89, to Salt Lake City
- Old Lincoln Highway, Salt Lake City to Ely, Nevada
  - An alternate route, approved in 1922, followed U.S. Route 6 from Santaquin, Utah (south of Salt Lake City) to Ely.
- U.S. Route 6, Ely, Nevada, U.S. Route 395, State Route 14 (California), and San Fernando Road, San Fernando Valley, to Los Angeles
