= List of lakes of West Virginia =

List of lakes in the U.S. state of West Virginia

There are more than 250 lakes and reservoirs in the U.S. state of West Virginia.

== Overview ==
Trout Pond, situated in Hardy County, is West Virginia's sole natural lake. The state's largest reservoir is Summersville Lake, located in Nicholas County, encompassing a surface area of 2,790 acres (1,130 ha). Spruce Knob Lake, found in Randolph County, holds the distinction of being the highest lake in the state at an elevation of 3,845 feet (1,172 m). Additionally, West Virginia is home to ten reservoirs owned by the United States Army Corps of Engineers (USACE). As of 2025, at least one public lake is present in 48 of the state’s 55 counties, reflecting the state’s extensive freshwater resources.

== Current lakes and reservoirs ==
List of lakes and reservoirs in West Virginia
Name	County or Counties	Type	Surface Area (acres) (Note: Surface areas for West Virginia public lakes are sourced from the West Virginia Fishing Regulations Summary 2025, published by the West Virginia Division of Natural Resources (WVDNR). Surface areas for all other lakes are sourced from the United States Army Corps of Engineers (USACE), as referenced in the Notes column.)	Elevation (ft)	Year Compl.	Purpose / Use	Notes
Ada Lake	Mercer; 37°16′51.7″N 81°09′02.3″W	Reservoir	15 acres (6.1 ha)	2,680 feet (820 m)	1924	Water supply	Formed by an earthen dam on an unnamed tributary of the East River in Dam Hollow, and owned and managed by West Virginia American Water Company.
Airport Pond	Logan; 37°51′20.3″N 81°54′28.0″W	Reservoir	1 acre (0.40 ha)	1,567 feet (478 m)	—	Recreation	Managed by the West Virginia Division of Natural Resources (WVDR), and located at Logan County Airport.
Alpine Lake	Preston; 39°28′10.98″N 79°29′55.30″W	Reservoir	160 acres (65 ha)	2,566 feet (782 m)	1971	Recreation	Also known as Hulls Lake. Formed by an earthen dam on Wardwell Run, and owned and managed by Alpine Lake Resort and Conference Center.
Anawalt Lake	McDowell; 37°19′09.1″N 81°25′19.2″W	Reservoir	6 acres (2.4 ha)	1,848 feet (563 m)	—	Recreation	Formed by an earthen dam on Millseat Branch, and owned and managed by the WVDNR. Located within Anawalt Lake Wildlife Management Area.
Appalachian Lake	Preston; 39°42′36.53″N 79°29′41.04″W	Reservoir	14 acres (5.7 ha)	2,116 feet (645 m)	—	Private use	Formed by an earthen dam on Fike Run, and privately owned.
Asbury Lake	Wayne; 37°57′1.88″N 82°24′1.93″W	Reservoir	2 acres (0.81 ha)	850 feet (260 m)	1959	Recreation	Formed by an earthen dam on the Right Fork Moses Fork, the reservoir is privately owned.
Baker Lake	Ohio; 40°04′55.6″N 80°32′06.4″W	Reservoir	2 acres (0.81 ha)	1,142 feet (348 m)	1948	Recreation	Also known as Bear Rocks Lake No. 3. Formed by an earthen dam on Todd Run, and owned and managed by the WVDNR. Located within Bear Rocks Lake Wildlife Management Area.
Bear Lake	Ohio; 40°04′43.9″N 80°32′01.5″W	Reservoir	10 acres (4.0 ha)	1,123 feet (342 m)	1948	Recreation	Also known as Bear Rocks Lake No. 2. Formed by an earthen dam on Todd Run, and owned and managed by the WVDNR. Located within Bear Rocks Lake Wildlife Management Area.
Beech Fork Lake	Cabell; Wayne; 38°18′57.39″N 82°22′58.40″W	Reservoir	720 acres (290 ha)	584 feet (178 m)	1976	Fish and wildlife, Flood risk reduction, Recreation	Formed by Beech Fork Dam on Beech Fork, a Twelvepole Creek tributary, and managed by the United States Army Corps of Engineers (USACE). Beech Fork State Park and Beech Fork Lake Wildlife Management Area are located along the reservoir.
Berwind Lake	McDowell; 37°15′43.98″N 81°42′15.98″W	Reservoir	17 acres (6.9 ha)	1,650 feet (500 m)	1959	Recreation	Also known as Lake Berwind. Formed by an earthen dam on War Creek with an inflow from Big Branch, and owned and managed by the WVDNR. Located within Berwind Lake Wildlife Management Area.
Big Bear Lake	Preston; 39°36′1.80″N 79°30′19.30″W	Reservoir	35 acres (14 ha)	2,602 feet (793 m)	1972	Recreation	Formed by an earthen dam on Beaver Creek, the reservoir is privately owned.
Big Ditch Lake	Webster; 38°24′27.6″N 80°34′20.3″W	Reservoir	65 acres (26 ha)	2,243 feet (684 m)	1968	Flood risk reduction, Recreation	Also known as Big Ditch Lake No. 1. Formed by an earthen dam on Long Glade Ditch, and located within Big Ditch Wildlife Management Area.
Bluestone Lake	Mercer; Summers; 37°36′27.76″N 80°54′24.41″W	Reservoir	2,040 acres (830 ha)	1,404 feet (428 m)	1947	Flood risk reduction, Fish and wildlife, Recreation	Formed by Bluestone Dam on the New River, with inflows from Bluestone River and Pipestem Creek, and managed by the USACE. Bluestone State Park are Bluestone Wildlife Management Area are located along the reservoir.
Boley Lake	Fayette; 37°58′30.2″N 80°57′12.1″W	Reservoir	17 acres (6.9 ha)	2,452 feet (747 m)	1965	Recreation	Formed by an earthen dam on Glade Creek, and located within Babcock State Park.
Brandywine Lake	Pendleton; 38°36′02.4″N 79°12′14.7″W	Reservoir	9 acres (3.6 ha)	1,854 feet (565 m)	1960	Flood risk reduction	Formed by the South Fork No. 13 dam on Hawes Run, a tributary of the South Fork South Branch Potomac River. Owned by the West Virginia Conservation Agency (WVCA) Potomac Valley Conservation District. Located within the Brandywine Recreation Area of George Washington National Forest.
Brushy Fork Lake	Pendleton; 38°27′50.3″N 79°19′07.7″W	Reservoir	23 acres (9.3 ha)	1,999 feet (609 m)	1982	Flood risk reduction	Also known as South Fork No. 19. Formed by an earthen dam on the Brushy Fork tributary of the South Fork South Branch Potomac River. Owned and managed by the WVCA Potomac Valley Conservation District.
Buffalo Creek Reservoir	Harrison; 39°11′57.6″N 80°25′34.3″W	Reservoir	55 acres (22 ha)	1,017 feet (310 m)	1956	Recreation	Formed by an earthen dam on Buffalo Creek, and is privately owned.
Burnsville Lake	Braxton; 38°49′30.4″N 80°36′25.1″W	Reservoir	968 acres (392 ha)	784 feet (239 m)	1976	Fish and wildlife, Flood risk reduction, Recreation	Formed by Burnsville Dam on the Little Kanawha River, with inflows from Big Run and Little Knawl Creek, and managed by the USACE. Burnsville Lake Wildlife Management Area is located along the reservoir.
Cacapon Lake	Morgan; 39°30′28.7″N 78°18′22.8″W	Reservoir	12 acres (4.9 ha)	1,060 feet (320 m)	1974	Water supply	Formed by an earthen dam on North Fork Indian Run in Cacapon Resort State Park.
Cacapon State Park Lake	Morgan; 39°30′03.4″N 78°17′49.8″W	Reservoir	6 acres (2.4 ha)	868 feet (265 m)	1937	Recreation	Formed by an earthen dam on Indian Run in Cacapon Resort State Park, with inflows from the North, Middle, and South Forks of Indian Run. Built by the Civilian Conservation Corps (CCC) and part of the New Deal Resources in Cacapon State Park Historic District on the National Register of Historic Places (NRHP).
Caesar Lake	Webster; 38°24′52.2″N 80°29′13.5″W	Reservoir	17 acres (6.9 ha)	2,366 feet (721 m)	1955	Recreation	Formed by an earthen dam on Upper Glade Run, and located in Camp Caesar.
Castleman Run Lake	Brooke; Ohio; 40°09′58.6″N 80°32′02.5″W	Reservoir	14 acres (5.7 ha)	934 feet (285 m)	1961	Recreation	Formed by an earthen dam on Castleman Run, and located within Castleman Run Lake Wildlife Management Area.
Charles Fork Lake	Roane; 38°45′55.4″N 81°20′35.3″W	Reservoir	72 acres (29 ha)	801 feet (244 m)	1973	Flood risk reduction, Water supply	Formed by Charles Fork No. 17 dam on Charles Fork, a tributary of Left Fork Spring Creek. Owned by the city of Spencer.
Lake Chaweva	Kanawha; 38°24′56.19″N 81°47′13.93″W	Reservoir	26.8 acres (10.8 ha)	686 feet (209 m)	2002	Recreation	Formed by Lake Chaweva dam on Rocky Fork, a tributary of the Pocatalico River. Owned by the Lake Chaweva Club.
Cheat Lake	Monongalia; 39°41′3.06″N 79°52′50.68″W	Reservoir	1,730 acres (700 ha)	869 feet (265 m)	1926	Hydroelectric, Recreation	Also known as Lake Lynn; formed by Cheat Lake Dam on the Cheat River, with inflows from Coles, Morgan, and Rubles runs; and owned and managed by Lake Lynn Generation, LLC. Cheat Lake Park and Cheat Lake Rail Trail are located along the reservoir.
Christian Fork Lake	Mercer; 37°22′01.9″N 81°02′34.2″W	Reservoir	14 acres (5.7 ha)	2,441 feet (744 m)	1959	Flood risk reduction	Also known as Daves Fork No. 3. Formed by an earthen dam on the Christian Fork tributary of Daves Fork, and owned and managed by the WVCA Southern Conservation District.
Conaway Run Lake	Tyler; 39°25′21.8″N 80°51′06.4″W	Reservoir	31 acres (13 ha)	766 feet (233 m)	1963	Recreation	Formed by an earthen dam on Conaway Run, and owned and managed by the WVDNR. Located within Conaway Run Lake Wildlife Management Area.
Crystal Lake	Doddridge; 39°19′37.2″N 80°47′42.8″W	Reservoir	27 acres (11 ha)	761 feet (232 m)	1924	Recreation	Formed by an earthen dam on a tributary of Middle Island Creek, and privately owned.
East Lynn Lake	Wayne; 38°6′3.28″N 82°20′46.26″W	Reservoir	1,005 acres (407 ha)	656 feet (200 m)	1971	Fish and wildlife, Flood risk reduction, Recreation	Formed by East Lynn Dam on the East Fork of Twelvepole Creek, and managed by the USACE. East Lynn Lake Wildlife Management Area is located along the reservoir.
Elk Fork Lake	Jackson; 38°48′14.9″N 81°37′23.4″W	Reservoir	109 acres (44 ha)	634 feet (193 m)	1997	Flood risk reduction, Recreation	Formed by an earthen dam on the Elk Fork of Mill Creek, and owned by the Sissonville Public Service District. Located within the Elk Fork Lake Wildlife Management Area.
Flat Top Lake	Raleigh; 37°37′30.2″N 81°06′01.9″W	Reservoir	234 acres (95 ha)	2,897 feet (883 m)	1950	Recreation	Formed by Flat Top Lake Dam on Glade Creek, and privately owned.
Lake Floyd	Harrison; 39°17′07.3″N 80°30′21.5″W	Reservoir	31 acres (13 ha)	1,060 feet (320 m)	1923	Recreation	Formed by an earthen dam on the Halls Run of Tenmile Creek, and privately owned.
Glade Creek Reservoir	Raleigh; 37°41′44.7″N 81°03′16.4″W	Reservoir	10 acres (4.0 ha)	2,674 feet (815 m)	1945	Water supply	Formed by Glade Creek Dam No. 1 on Glade Creek, and owned by the Beckley Water Company.
Glade Creek Reservoir No. 2	Raleigh; 37°40′17.0″N 81°03′58.2″W	Reservoir	93 acres (38 ha)	2,790 feet (850 m)	1975	Water supply	Formed by Glade Creek Dam No. 2 on Glade Creek, and owned by the Beckley Water Company.
Hawks Nest Lake	Fayette; 38°07′12.4″N 81°07′44.1″W	Reservoir	234 acres (95 ha)	758 feet (231 m)	1936	Hydroelectric, Recreation	Also known as Hawk Lake. Formed by Hawks Nest Dam on the New River. Hawks Nest State Park is located along the reservoir.
Jennings Randolph Lake	Mineral; 39°25′5.23″N 79°8′10.43″W	Reservoir	952 acres (385 ha)	1,467 feet (447 m)	1981	Flood risk reduction, Recreation, Water supply	Originally known as Bloomington Lake. Formed by Jennings Randolph Dam on the North Branch Potomac River, with inflows from Deep Run and Howell Run, and managed by the USACE. Located in both Maryland and West Virginia.
Jimmy Lewis Lake	Mercer; 37°18′25.32″N 81°17′33.46″W	Reservoir	13 acres (5.3 ha)	2,297 feet (700 m)	1965	Recreation	Also known as Pinnacle Rock Lake Number One. Formed by an earthen dam on the Lick Fork tributary of Bluestone River, and located in Pinnacle Rock State Park.
Kimsey Run Lake	Hardy; 38°57′33.3″N 78°49′00.2″W	Reservoir	47 acres (19 ha)	1,419 feet (433 m)	1996	Flood risk reduction	Formed by Lost River #4 Dam on Kimsey Run, and owned and managed by the WVCA Potomac Valley Conservation District.
Little Beaver Lake	Raleigh; 37°45′10.62″N 81°4′51.31″W	Reservoir	18 acres (7.3 ha)	2,415 feet (736 m)	1941	Recreation	Formed by Little Beaver Dam on Little Beaver Creek, and located in Little Beaver State Park. The dam was built by the Works Progress Administration and is listed on the NRHP.
Long Branch Lake	Summers; 37°32′07.7″N 80°58′58.9″W	Reservoir	18 acres (7.3 ha)	2,674 feet (815 m)	1966	Recreation	Also known as Pipestem Lake. Formed by an earthen dam on Pipestem Creek, and located in Pipestem Resort State Park.
Moncove Lake	Monroe; 37°37′11.6″N 80°20′58.7″W	Reservoir	93 acres (38 ha)	2,500 feet (760 m)	1959	Fish and wildlife, Recreation	Formed by an earthen dam on Devil Creek, and located in Moncove Lake State Park and Moncove Lake Wildlife Management Area.
Mount Storm Lake	Grant; 39°11′15.37″N 79°15′38.46″W	Reservoir	1,170 acres (470 ha)	3,251 feet (991 m)	1964	Industrial cooling, Recreation	Formed by Mount Storm Lake Dam on the Stony River, used to cool the Mount Storm Power Station, and owned and operated by Dominion Energy.
North Bend Lake	Ritchie; 39°13′15.2″N 81°04′59.7″W	Reservoir	235 acres (95 ha)	711 feet (217 m)	2002	Flood risk reduction, Recreation	Formed by a dam on the North Fork Hughes River, with an inflow from Lost Run, and partially located in North Bend State Park.
O'Brien Lake	Jackson; 38°45′03.6″N 81°38′04.7″W	Reservoir	197 acres (80 ha)	642 feet (196 m)	1986	Flood risk reduction, Recreation	Formed by Mill Creek No. 13 dam on the Tug Fork of Mill Creek, located within O'Brien Lake Wildlife Management Area.
Parker Hollow Lake	Hardy; 39°02′26.5″N 78°47′57.2″W	Reservoir	34 acres (14 ha)	1,586 feet (483 m)	2005	Flood risk reduction	Formed by Lost River #10 Dam on the Parker Hollow Run, and owned and managed by the WVCA Potomac Valley Conservation District.
Pendleton Lake	Tucker; 39°07′01.9″N 79°29′51.9″W	Reservoir	10 acres (4.0 ha)	3,029 feet (923 m)	1957	Recreation	Formed by an earthen dam on Pendleton Run, and located in Blackwater Falls State Park.
Plum Orchard Lake	Fayette; 37°56′47.2″N 81°13′03.2″W	Reservoir	175 acres (71 ha)	1,736 feet (529 m)	1961	Recreation	Formed by Plum Orchard Lake Dam on Plum Orchard Creek, with inflows from Doris Branch, Beech Bottom Branch. Owned and operated by the WVDNR, and located within Plum Orchard Wildlife Management Area.
R. D. Bailey Lake	Mingo; Wyoming; 37°36′31.5″N 81°48′33.2″W	Reservoir	630 acres (250 ha)	1,043 feet (318 m)	1976	Fish and wildlife, Flood risk reduction, Recreation	Also known as Justice Reservoir. Formed R. D. Bailey Dam on the Guyandotte River, and owned and managed by the USACE. Located within the R. D. Bailey Wildlife Management Area.
Rock Lake	Ohio; 40°04′27.7″N 80°31′56.1″W	Reservoir	4 acres (1.6 ha)	1,087 feet (331 m)	1951	Recreation	Also known as Bear Rocks Lake No. 1. Formed by an earthen dam on Todd Run, and owned and managed by the WVDNR. Located within Bear Rocks Lake Wildlife Management Area.
Lake Shannondale	Jefferson; 39°12′37.3″N 77°48′55.6″W	Reservoir	62 acres (25 ha)	534 feet (163 m)	1965	Recreation	Formed by an earthen dam on Furnace Run, and owned and managed by Shannondale Club.
Lake Sherwood	Greenbrier; 38°00′21.7″N 80°00′20.1″W	Reservoir	161 acres (65 ha)	2,667 feet (813 m)	1957	Fish and wildlife, Recreation	Also known as Sherwood Lake. Formed by an earthen dam on Meadow Creek, owned and managed by the United States Forest Service (USFS), and located within the Lake Sherwood Recreation Area of the Monongahela National Forest.
Silver Lake	Preston; 39°15′18.8″N 79°29′44.9″W	Reservoir	—	2,494 feet (760 m)	1928	Recreation	Formed by a small splash dam on the Youghiogheny River, and located within the Silver Lake Park campground.
Sleepy Creek Lake	Berkeley; 39°31′03.8″N 78°09′19.1″W	Reservoir	209 acres (85 ha)	1,099 feet (335 m)	1962	Recreation	Formed by an earthen dam on the Meadow Branch of Sleepy Creek, and owned and managed by the WVDNR. Located within the Sleepy Creek Wildlife Management Area.
Spruce Knob Lake	Randolph; 38°42′09.5″N 79°35′17.7″W	Reservoir	26 acres (11 ha)	3,845 feet (1,172 m)	1952	Fish and wildlife, Recreation	Formed by an earthen dam on Narrow Ridge Run, owned and managed by the USFS, and located within the Spruce Knob–Seneca Rocks National Recreation Area of the Monongahela National Forest.
Stephens Lake	Raleigh; 37°47′18.8″N 81°18′06.7″W	Reservoir	276 acres (112 ha)	2,133 feet (650 m)	1963	Recreation	Formed by Stephens Lake Dam on Stephens Branch, and owned and managed by the Raleigh County Recreation Authority.
Stonecoal Lake	Lewis; Upshur; 38°58′49.0″N 80°20′51.4″W	Reservoir	539 acres (218 ha)	1,122 feet (342 m)	1972	Recreation	Formed by Stonecoal Creek Dam on Right Fork Stonecoal Creek, and owned by Allegheny Energy and managed by the WVDNR. Located within Stonecoal Lake Wildlife Management Area.
Stonewall Jackson Lake	Lewis; 38°59′57.01″N 80°28′31.55″W	Reservoir	2,650 acres (1,070 ha)	1,073 feet (327 m)	1986	Fish and wildlife, Flood risk reduction, Recreation, Water supply	Formed by Stonewall Jackson Dam on the West Fork River, with inflows from Glady Fork, Little Skin Creek, Sand Fork, Skin Creek, Wolf Fork, and managed by the USACE. Stonewall Jackson Lake State Park and Stonewall Jackson Lake Wildlife Management Area are located along the reservoir.
Summersville Lake	Nicholas; 38°13′36.05″N 80°53′3.38″W	Reservoir	2,790 acres (1,130 ha)	1,641 feet (500 m)	1965	Fish and wildlife, Flood risk reduction, Hydroelectric, Recreation	Formed by Summersville Dam on the Gauley River, and managed by the USACE. Summersville Lake State Park and Summersville Lake Wildlife Management Area are located along the reservoir.
Summit Lake	Greenbrier; 38°58′49.0″N 80°20′51.4″W	Reservoir	37 acres (15 ha)	3,386 feet (1,032 m)	1955	Fish and wildlife, Recreation, Water supply	Formed by an earthen dam on Coats Run, a tributary of the North Fork Cherry River, and owned and managed by the USFS. Located within the Gauley Ranger District of the Monongahela National Forest.
Sutton Lake	Braxton; Webster; 38°39′49.3″N 80°39′40.4″W	Reservoir	1,440 acres (580 ha)	915 feet (279 m)	1960	Fish and wildlife, Flood risk reduction, Recreation	Formed by the Sutton Dam on the Elk River and owned and managed by the USACE. Located within the Elk River Wildlife Management Area.
Tomlinson Run Lake	Hancock; 40°32′36.7″N 80°35′21.6″W	Reservoir	23 acres (9.3 ha)	915 feet (279 m)	1936	Recreation	Formed by the Tomlinson Lake Dam on Tomlinson Run, with inflows from the North Fork and South Fork of Tomlinson Run, and located within Tomlinson Run State Park. The dam was constructed by the CCC.
Trout Pond	Hardy; 38°57′18.29″N 78°44′9.88″W	Lake	1 acre (0.40 ha)	1,926 feet (587 m)	—	Recreation	Also known as Trout Pond Lake. West Virginia’s only natural lake. Trout Pond Run inflows and outflows from the lake. Owned by the USFS and located within the Trout Pond Recreation Area of George Washington National Forest and Wardensville Wildlife Management Area.
Tygart Lake	Barbour; Taylor; 39°15′59.90″N 79°59′3.32″W	Reservoir	1,750 acres (710 ha)	1,096 feet (334 m)	1938	Fish and wildlife, Flood risk reduction, Navigation, Recreation, Water supply	Formed by Tygart Dam on the Tygart Valley River, with inflows from Doe Run, Flag Run, Pleasant Creek, Sandy Creek, and Scab Run, and managed by the USACE. Tygart Lake State Park is located along the reservoir.
Upper Mud Lake	Lincoln; 38°09′48.1″N 82°03′36.7″W	Reservoir	237 acres (96 ha)	718 feet (219 m)	1992	Flood risk reduction, Recreation	Formed by the Upper Mud River No. 2a Dam on the Mud River, with an inflow from the Left Fork Mud River, and owned by the Lincoln County Commission. Located within the Upper Mud River Wildlife Management Area.
Warden Lake	Hardy; 39°08′01.8″N 78°35′50.9″W	Reservoir	46 acres (19 ha)	1,286 feet (392 m)	1959	Recreation	Formed by an earthen dam on Moores Run. Located within the Warden Lake Wildlife Management Area.
Watoga Lake	Pocahontas; 38°07′04.6″N 80°07′36.0″W	Reservoir	12 acres (4.9 ha)	2,602 feet (793 m)	1934	Fish and wildlife, Recreation	Formed by an earthen dam on Island Lick Run. Located within Watoga State Park. The lake was built by the CCC, and is included in the New Deal Resources in Watoga State Park Historic District listing on the NRHP.
Woodrum Lake	Jackson; 38°36′50.4″N 81°34′43.7″W	Reservoir	237 acres (96 ha)	720 feet (220 m)	1987	Flood risk reduction, Recreation	Formed by the Pocatalico Structure No. 28 dam on Middle Fork. Located within Woodrum Lake Wildlife Management Area.

== Former lakes and reservoirs ==
- Little Blue Run Lake (partially in Pennsylvania)
- Stony River Reservoir

== See also ==
- List of lakes

== Bibliography ==
- Bannon, James (1988). West Virginia: A Guide to Backcountry Travel and Adventure. Boston: Appalachian Mountain Club. ISBN 9780964858442. OCLC 1204324844 – via Internet Archive.
- De Hart, Allen (1997). Hiking the Mountain State: The Trails of West Virginia. Asheville, North Carolina: Out There Press. ISBN 0910146578. OCLC 1335927359 – via Internet Archive.
- West Virginia Department of Natural Resources (2025). West Virginia Fishing Regulations Summary 2025 (PDF). West Virginia Department of Natural Resources.
- West Virginia Legislature (2018). "Section Eleven: Departmental, Statistical, and General Information". In Lee Cassis, Clerk of the West Virginia Senate (ed.). West Virginia Blue Book, 2017-2018 (PDF). Charleston, West Virginia: Senate Clerk's Office. ISSN 0364-7323. OCLC 1251675.
