= West Virginia Route 82 =

State highway in West Virginia, United States

West Virginia Route 82

Route information
- Maintained by WVDOH
- Length: 16.8 mi (27.0 km)

Major junctions
- West end: US 19 / CR 1 in Birch River
- East end: WV 20 in Cowen

Location
- Country: United States
- State: West Virginia
- Counties: Nicholas, Webster

Highway system
- West Virginia State Highway System; Interstate; US; State
← I-81	→ WV 83

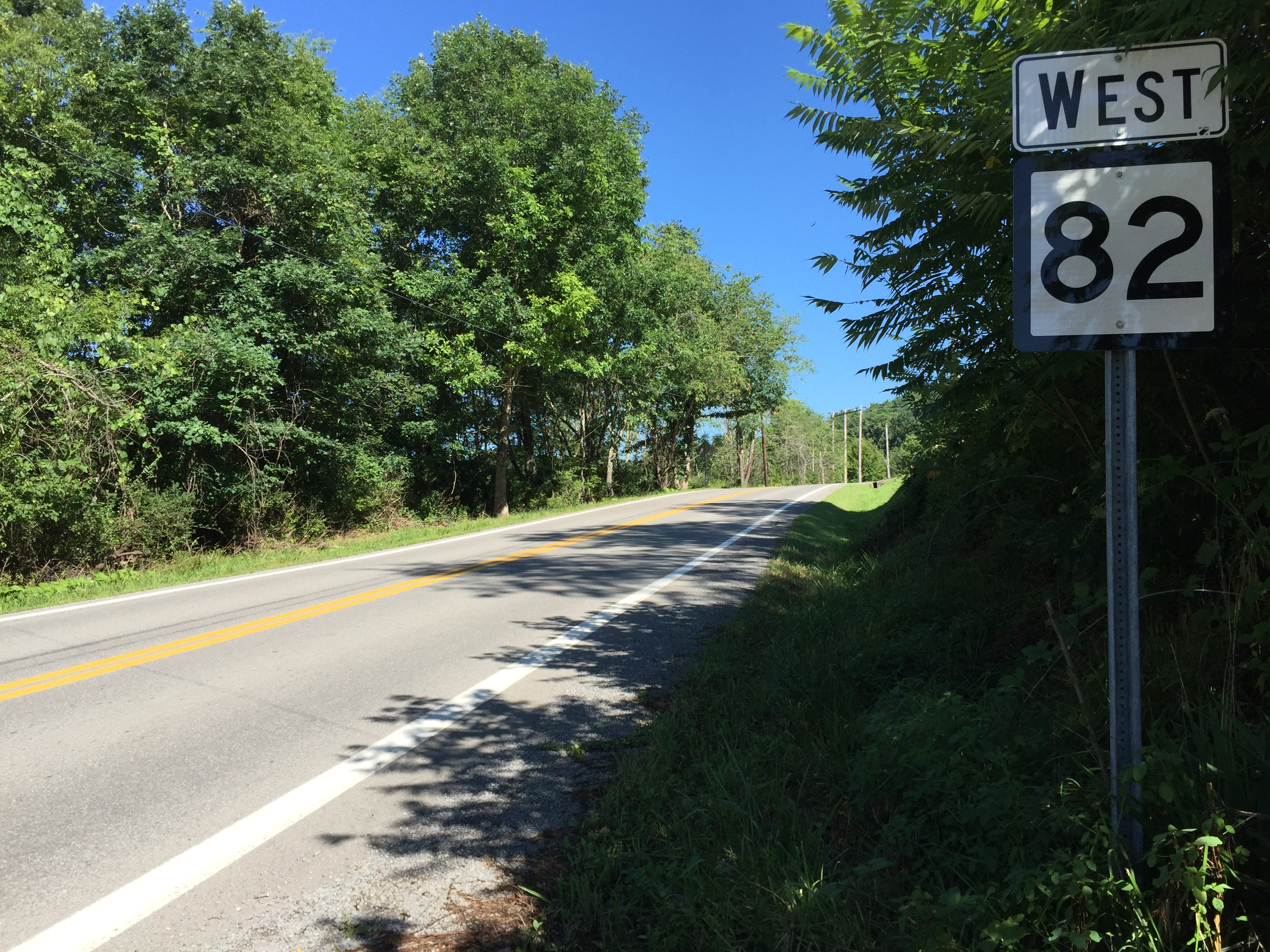
View west along WV 82 at WV 20 in Cowen

West Virginia Route 82 is an east–west state highway in central West Virginia, USA. The western terminus of the route is at an interchange with U.S. Route 19 in Birch River. The eastern terminus is at West Virginia Route 20 outside Cowen.

== Course ==
From Cowen, the road travels past the Big Ditch Wildlife Management Area and through Boggs in Webster County until reaching the community of Birch River in Nicholas County.

With the exception of a small portion by Big Ditch Lake, the entire route follows the Birch River.

== Major intersections ==
County	Location	mi	km	Destinations	Notes
Nicholas	Birch River			US 19 / CR 1 (Widen-Dille Road) – Summersville, Sutton	interchange
Webster				WV 20 – Cowen, Richwood	
1.000 mi = 1.609 km; 1.000 km = 0.621 mi
