= Boggs, West Virginia =

Unincorporated community in West Virginia, United States

Boggs
- Unincorporated community
- Location within the state of West Virginia Boggs (the United States)
- Coordinates: 38°28′7″N 80°37′30″W
- Country: United States
- State: West Virginia
- County: Webster
- Time zone: UTC-5 (Eastern (EST))
  - Summer (DST): UTC-4 (EDT)
- GNIS feature ID: 1550412

Boggs is an unincorporated community on the Birch River in Webster County, West Virginia, United States. Boggs lies along West Virginia Route 82.
