= Lake Warden =

Lake Warden may refer to:

- Lake Warden (Western Australia)
- Warden Lake, West Virginia, USA
