= Brushy Fork Lake =

- Location within West Virginia
- Location: Pendleton County, West Virginia
- Coordinates: 38°27′56″N 79°19′13″W
- Type: reservoir
- Primary inflows: South Branch South Fork Potomac River
- Primary outflows: South Branch South Fork Potomac River
- Basin countries: United States
- Surface area: 18 acres (7 ha)

Brushy Fork Lake is an 18-acre (7 ha) impoundment on the South Branch South Fork Potomac River located three miles (5 km) south of Sugar Grove in southeastern Pendleton County, West Virginia, United States. Brushy Fork Lake lies in the Dry River District of the George Washington National Forest.

== Recreation ==
=== Fishing ===
Multiple West Virginia stage record fish were caught along the Brushy Fork Lake.

== See also ==
- List of lakes of West Virginia
