= Big Ditch Wildlife Management Area =

State Wildlife Management Area in Webster County, West Virginia

- IUCN category V (protected landscape/seascape)
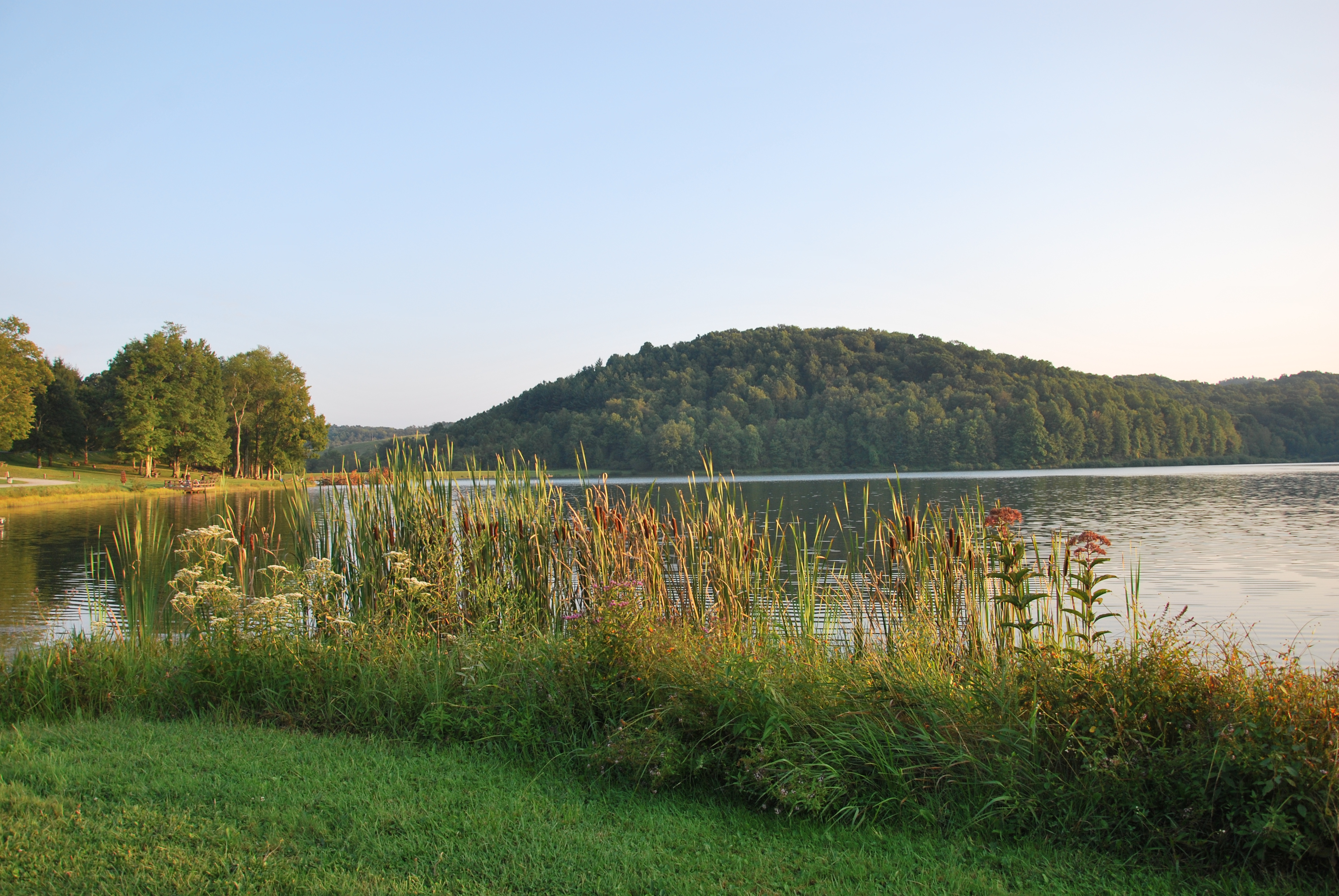
- Big Ditch Lake

- Location within West Virginia
- Location: Webster, West Virginia, United States
- Coordinates: 38°24′23″N 80°34′19″W
- Area: 388 acres (157 ha)
- Elevation: 2,241 ft (683 m)
- Website: WVDNR District 3 Wildlife Management Areas

Big Ditch Wildlife Management Area is a protected area located in Webster County, West Virginia near the town of Cowen. The WMA is 388 acres (157 ha) in size and is centered on Big Ditch Lake, a 55-acre (22 ha) man-made reservoir.

== Directions ==
Big Ditch located along Birch River Road (West Virginia Route 82) less than 1 mile (1.6 km) west of the intersection of West Virginia Routes 20 and 82 at the southern edge of Cowen.

== Hunting and Trapping ==
Activities include fishing for warm water species like largemouth bass, crappie, and channel catfish and picnics. Small game, waterfowl and bow hunting is permitted seasonally.

== See also ==
- Animal conservation
- Hunting
- List of lakes of West Virginia
- List of West Virginia wildlife management areas
- Recreational fishing
