= Cacapon Mountain =

Mountain in West Virginia, United States

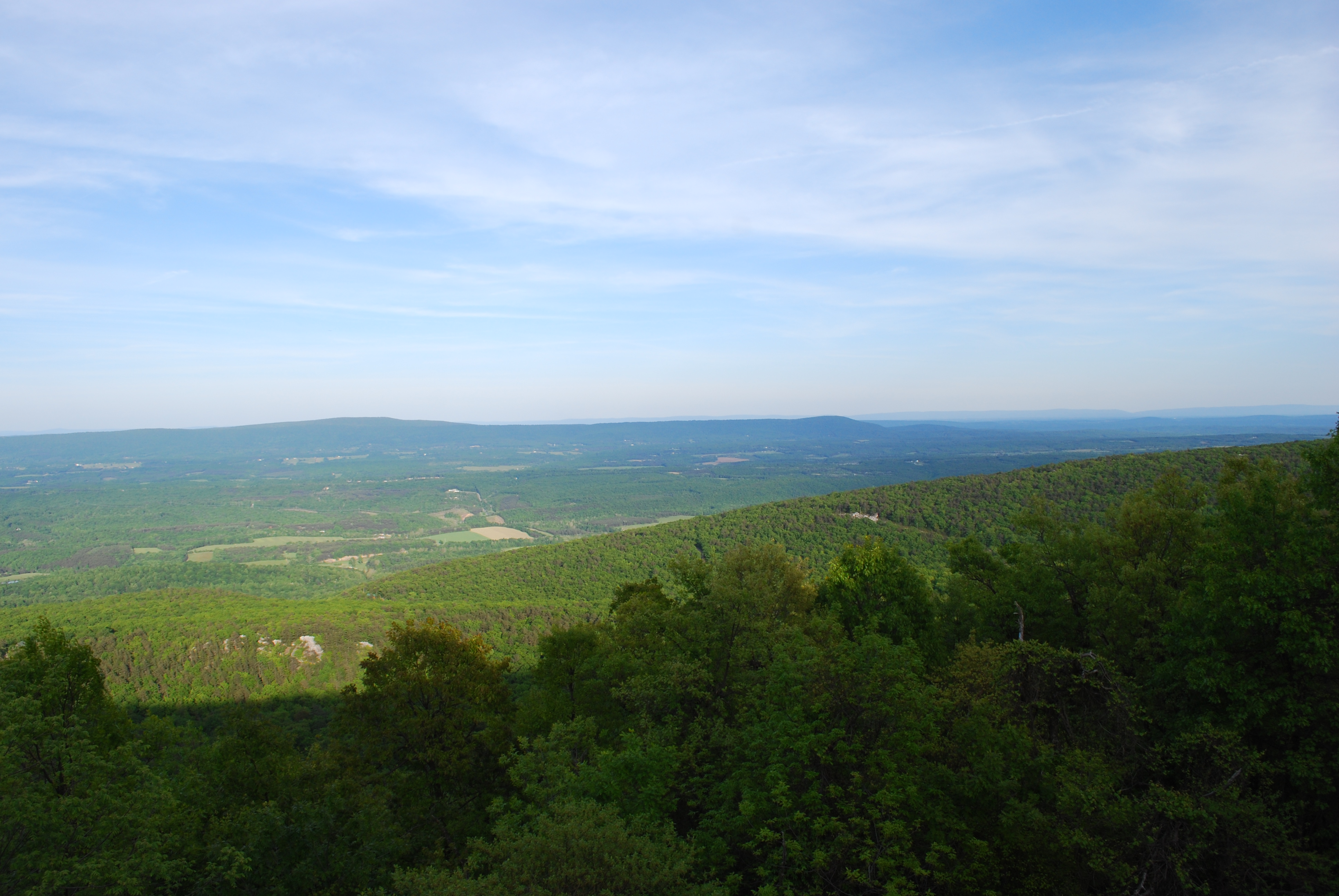
- View from Cacapon Mountain overlook in Cacapon Resort State Park

Highest point
- Elevation: 2,618 ft (798 m)
- Coordinates: 39°26′37″N 78°20′49″W

Geography
- Location within Virginia
- Location: West Virginia / Virginia, U.S.
- Parent range: Ridge-and-Valley Appalachians
- Topo map(s): USGS Ridge, Great Cacapon

Climbing
- Easiest route: Drive

Cacapon Mountain (/kəˈkeɪpən/ kə-KAY-pən) runs northwest through Morgan and Hampshire Counties in West Virginia's eastern panhandle, rising to its greatest elevation of 2,618 feet (798 m) above sea-level at High Point. Cacapon Mountain is a folded mountain ridge, belonging to the Appalachian Ridge and Valley Province. Cacapon Mountain spans 16 miles (26 km) NNE to the Potomac River near Great Cacapon.

From its southern point, Cacapon Mountain rises from the landscape north of Bloomery in northeastern Hampshire County. The mountain's western flank forms a series of steep hollows such as Horsebone Hollow and the hollow that bears Falling Spring Run. Beyond these hollows lies the Cacapon River, which parallels Cacapon Mountain until it joins the Potomac River. Between Bloomery and the Morgan County line, Cacapon Mountain forms the border between Hampshire and Frederick County in Virginia. While in Morgan County, the majority of Cacapon Mountain lies in Cacapon Resort State Park. The mountain forms a series of warm springs that flow from the Devonian Oriskany (Ridgeley) sandstone along the eastern flank of its anticline such as those at Berkeley Springs. Cacapon Mountain's northern end is located at the scenic Panorama Overlook off West Virginia Route 9 that overlooks three states and the confluence of the Cacapon and Potomac Rivers.
