= Conaway Run Lake Wildlife Management Area =

Wildlife Management Area in West Virginia, US

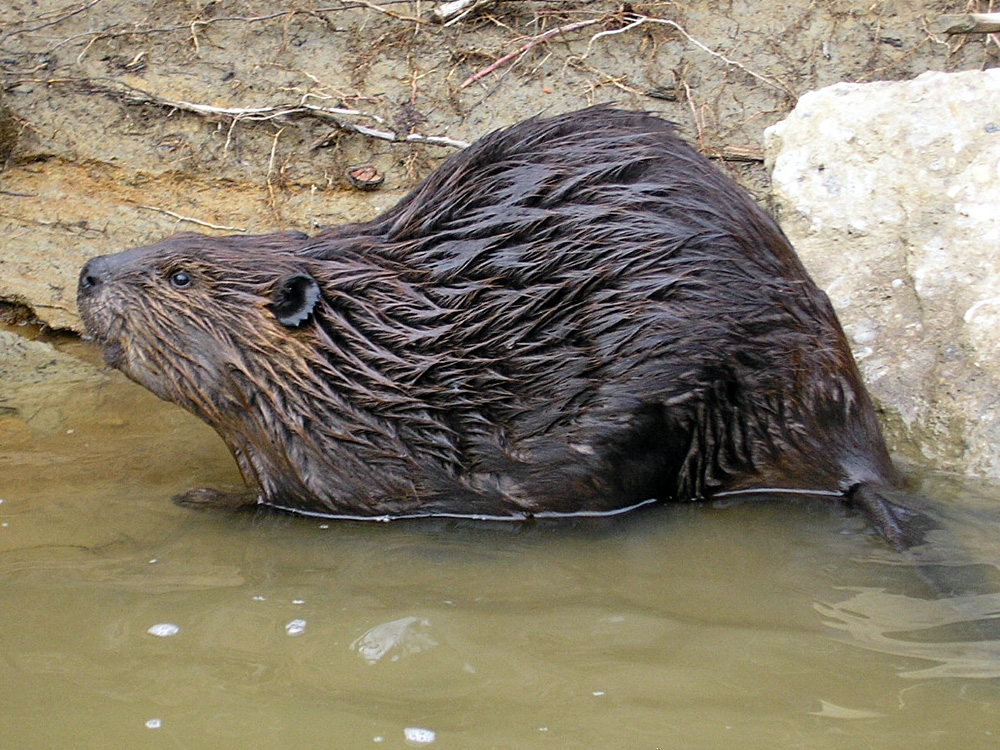
- American beaver (Castor canadensis) may be found in the Conaway Run Lake WMA

- Location within West Virginia
- Location: Tyler, West Virginia, United States
- Coordinates: 39°25′27″N 80°51′11″W
- Area: 630 acres (250 ha)
- Elevation: 800 ft (240 m)
- Operator: Wildlife Resources Section, WVDNR

Conaway Run Lake Wildlife Management Area is located on 630 acres (250 ha) in Tyler County near Middlebourne, West Virginia. Mixed hardwoods forests and brush cover much of the hillsides surrounding the 30-acre (12 ha) Conaway Run Lake. Conaway Run Lake WMA can be reached on Conaway Run Road off West Virginia Route 18, about 10 miles (16 km) south of Middlebourne.

== Hunting, fishing and trapping ==
Hunting opportunities include deer, grouse, squirrel and turkey. Conaway Run Lake provides fishing opportunities for largemouth bass, bluegill and channel catfish, as well as stocked trout. The lake is equipped with two small boat ramps and a handicapped fishing pier. Trappers have the opportunity to pursue beaver, muskrat, raccoon, mink or fox.

A shooting range is available for gun enthusiasts. Rustic camping sites are available (for a small fee) for tents and small trailers.

== See also ==
- Animal conservation
- Animal trapping
- Fishing
- Hunting
- List of lakes of West Virginia
- List of West Virginia wildlife management areas
