= Stonecoal Creek =

Tributary of West Fork River in West Virginia

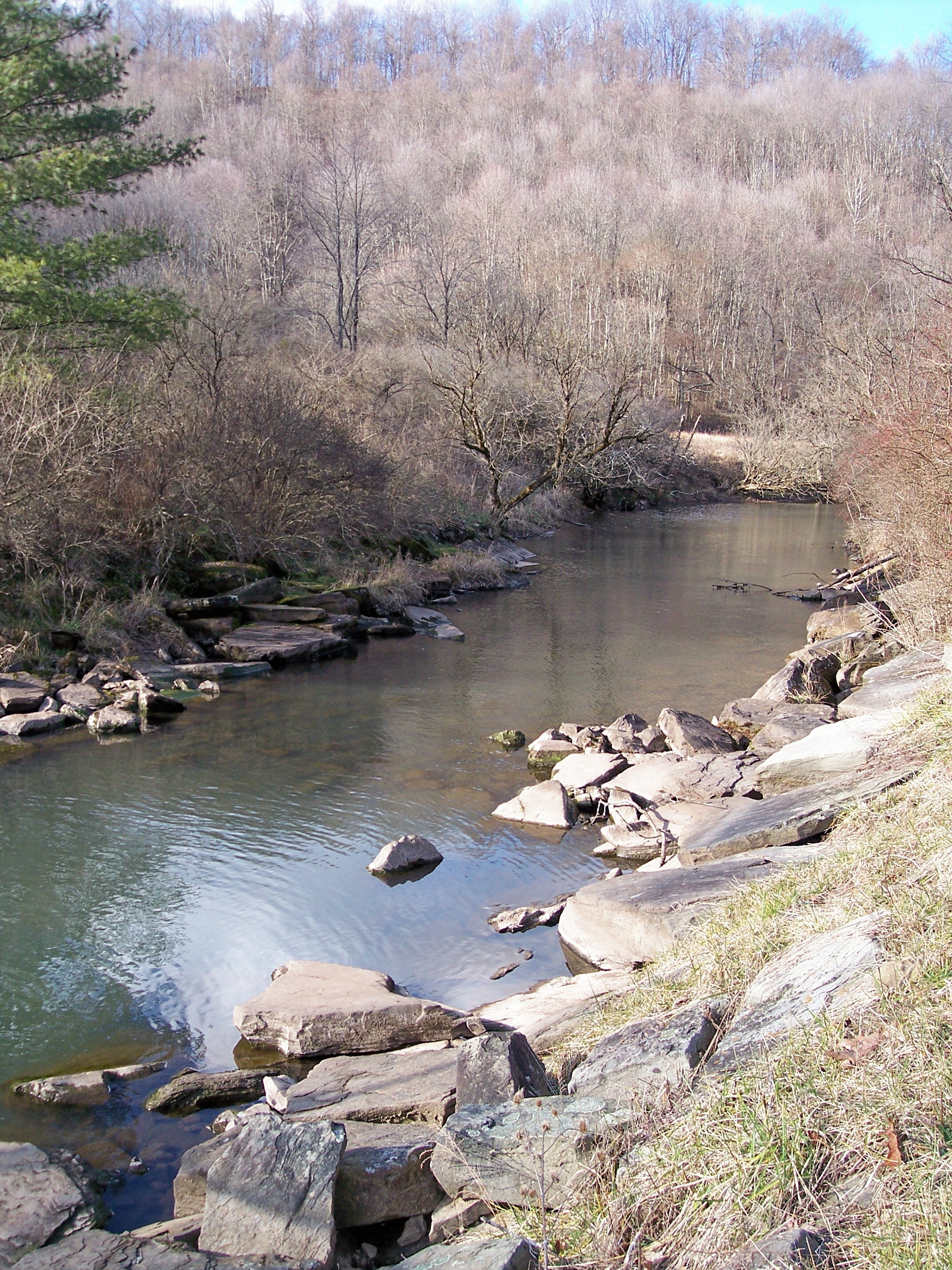
- The Right Fork of Stonecoal Creek, downstream of Stonecoal Lake in 2006

- Location of the mouth of Stonecoal Creek in Weston, West Virginia

Location
- Country: United States
- State: West Virginia
- Counties: Lewis, Upshur

Physical characteristics
- Source
  - location: northwestern Upshur County
  - coordinates: 39°00′47″N 80°18′47″W
  - elevation: 1,453 ft (443 m)
- Mouth: West Fork River
  - location: Weston, WV
  - coordinates: 39°02′36″N 80°27′43″W
  - elevation: 1,010 ft (310 m)
- Length: 12.8 mi (20.6 km)
- Basin size: 41 sq mi (110 km^{2})

Basin features
- Tributaries
  - left: Right Fork Stonecoal Creek

Stonecoal Creek is a tributary of the West Fork River, 12.8 miles (20.6 km) long, in north-central West Virginia in the United States. Via the West Fork, Monongahela and Ohio Rivers, it is part of the watershed of the Mississippi River, draining an area of 41 square miles (110 km^{2}) on the unglaciated portion of the Allegheny Plateau. The stream is believed to have been named in the late 1760s by a group of explorers and settlers (including Jesse Hughes), who found coal in nearby hills and mixed with pebbles in the stream.

Stonecoal Creek rises approximately five miles (8 km) west-northwest of Buckhannon in northwestern Upshur County and flows westwardly into northern Lewis County, where it joins the West Fork River from the east in the city of Weston. Its principal tributary, the 9.7-mile (15.6 km) Right Fork Stonecoal Creek, was dammed in Lewis County to form Stonecoal Lake in 1972 by Allegheny Energy for the purpose of providing water to a power plant in Harrison County. The 550-acre (220 ha) lake is privately owned, but is managed by the West Virginia Division of Natural Resources, as is a Wildlife Management Area surrounding the lake.

According to the West Virginia Department of Environmental Protection, approximately 77% of Stonecoal Creek's watershed is forested, mostly deciduous. Approximately 19% is used for pasture and agriculture, and approximately 2% is urban.

== Variant spellings ==
According to the Geographic Names Information System, Stonecoal Creek has also been known historically as:

- Stone Coal Creek
- Stone Cole Creek
- Stone Cole Run

== See also ==
- List of West Virginia rivers
