= Berwind Lake Wildlife Management Area =

State Wildlife Management Area in McDowell County, West Virginia

- IUCN category V (protected landscape/seascape)
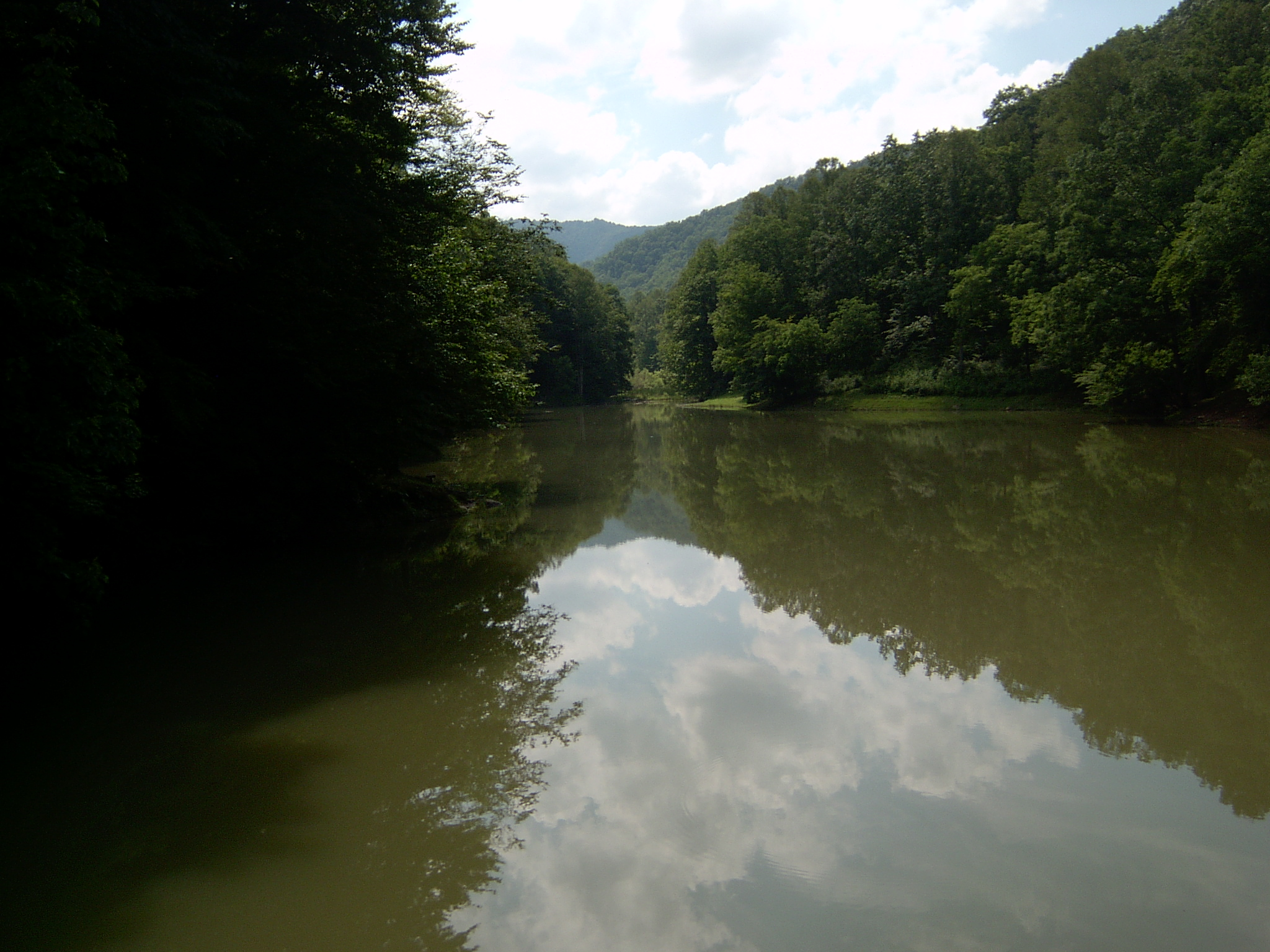
- Berwind Lake

- Location within West Virginia
- Location: McDowell, West Virginia, United States
- Coordinates: 37°15′47″N 81°42′51″W
- Area: 85 acres (34 ha)
- Elevation: 1,903 ft (580 m)
- Established: 1974

Berwind Lake Wildlife Management Area is located on 85 acres (340,000 m^{2}) near War in McDowell County, West Virginia. The wildlife management area is centered on 20-acre (81,000 m^{2}) Berwind Lake.

Berwind Lake WMA used to be one of the largest wildlife management areas in the state, encompassing over 18,000 acres (73 km^{2}), but much of this land was lost after the Berwind Lake Company lease under which it was operated expired.

== See also ==
- Animal conservation
- List of lakes of West Virginia
- List of West Virginia wildlife management areas
