= Buffalo Creek Reservoir =

- Location within West Virginia
- Location: Harrison County, near West Milford, West Virginia, US
- Coordinates: 39.1998131°N 80.4237029°W
- Type: reservoir
- Primary inflows: Buffalo Creek
- Primary outflows: Buffalo Creek
- Basin countries: United States
- Surface elevation: 1,017 feet (310 m)

Buffalo Creek Reservoir is a reservoir near West Milford in Harrison County, West Virginia, United States. The reservoir is formed by an impoundment on Buffalo Creek, a tributary stream of the West Fork River.

== See also ==
- List of lakes of West Virginia
