= Birch River, West Virginia =

Birch River
- Census-designated place (CDP)
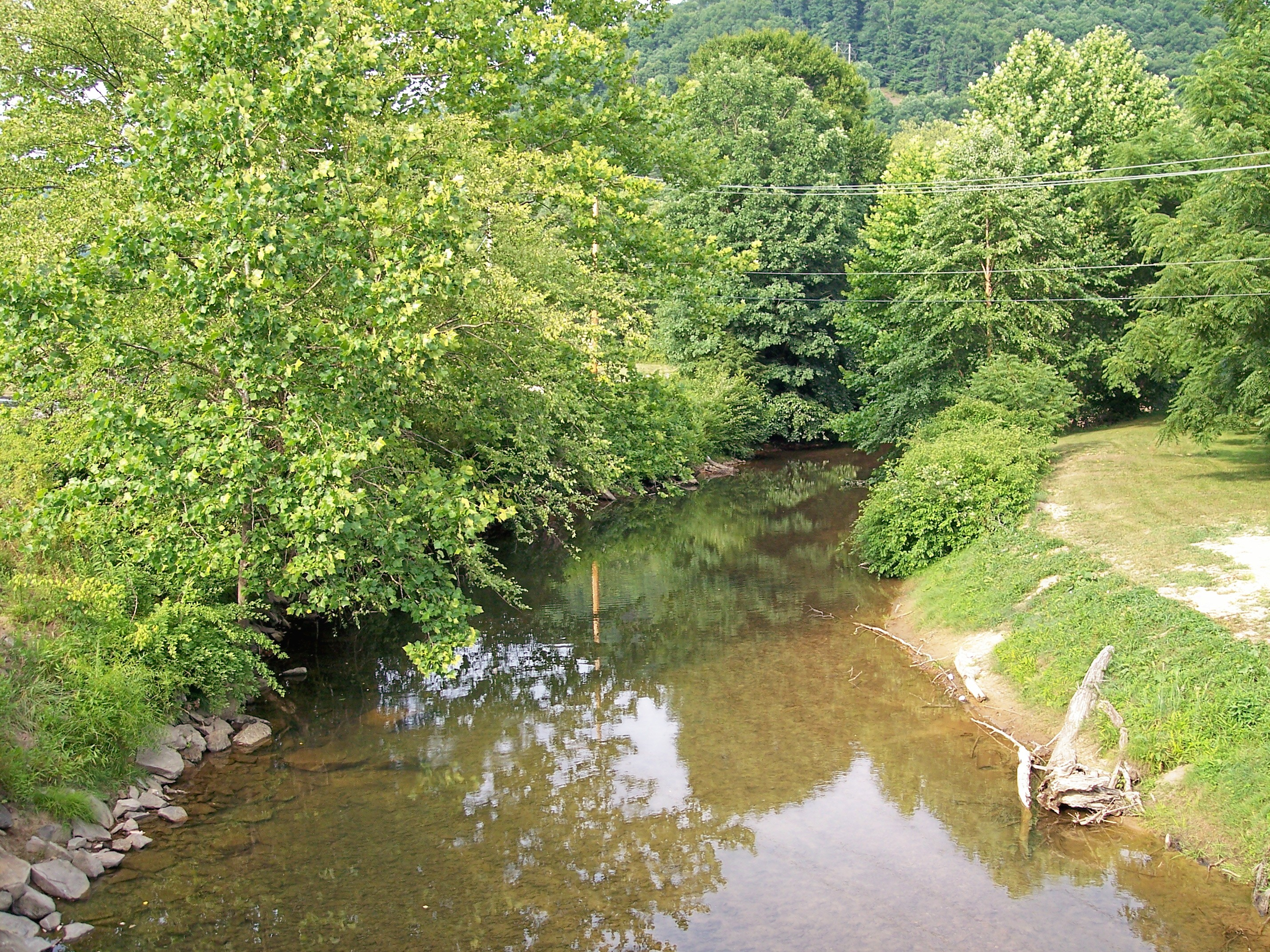
- The Birch River in the community of Birch River in 2007

- Location within the state of West Virginia
- Coordinates: 38°29′57″N 80°45′13″W
- Country: United States
- State: West Virginia
- County: Nicholas

Area
  - Total: 0.381 sq mi (0.99 km^{2})
  - Land: 0.368 sq mi (0.95 km^{2})
  - Water: 0.013 sq mi (0.034 km^{2})

Population (2020)
  - Total: 86
  - Density: 230/sq mi (90/km^{2})
- Time zone: UTC-5 (Eastern (EST))
  - Summer (DST): UTC-4 (EDT)

Birch River is a census-designated place (CDP) in northern Nicholas County, West Virginia, United States. The community is situated in the valley of the Birch River and is the location of the western terminus of West Virginia Route 82, at U.S. Route 19. As of the 2020 census, its population was 86 (down from 107 at the 2010 census).
