= East Lynn Lake =

State Wildlife Management Area in Wayne County, West Virginia

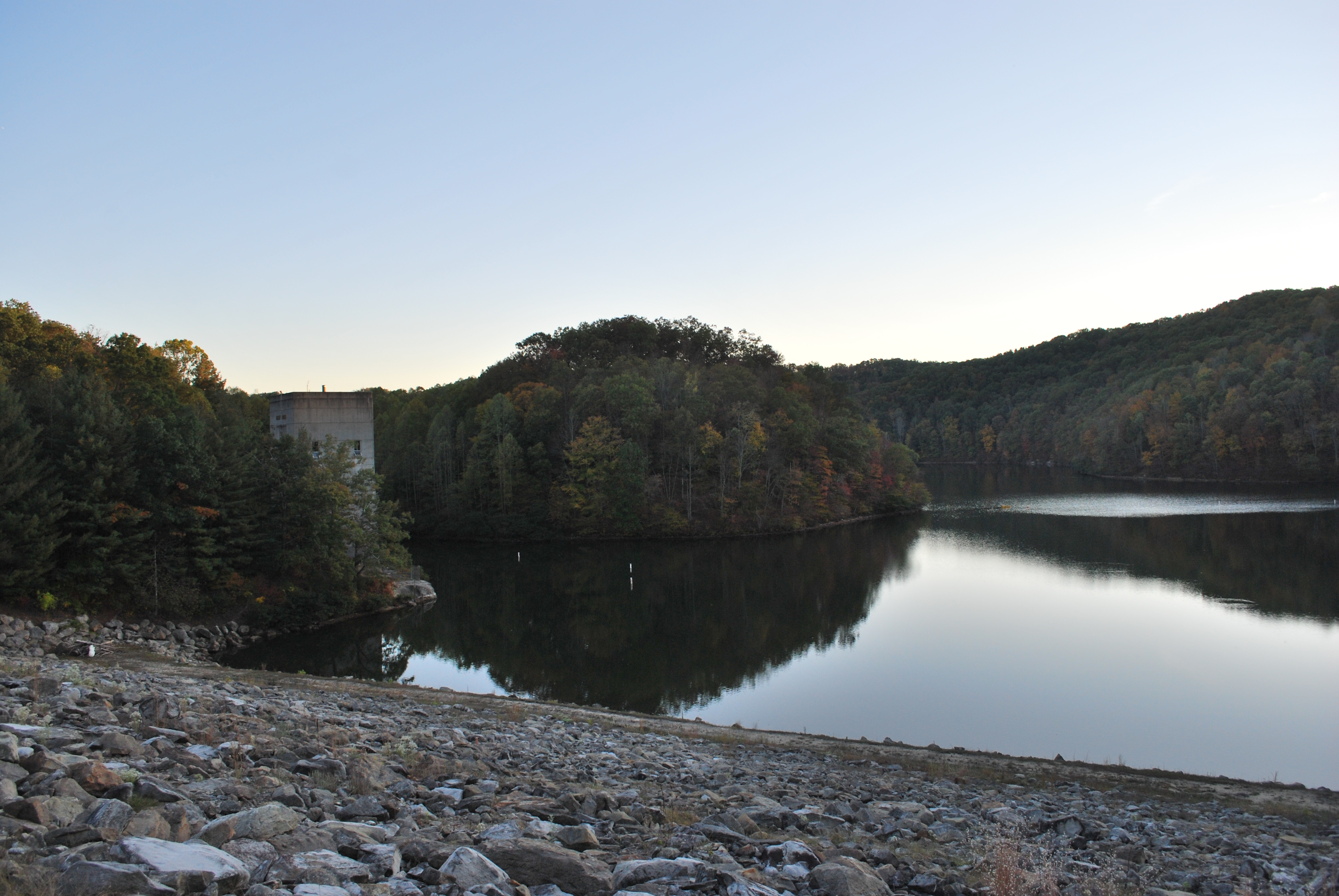
- View from the dam

- Location within West Virginia
- Location: Wayne County, West Virginia
- Coordinates: 38°08′42″N 82°23′02″W
- Type: reservoir
- Primary inflows: East Fork Twelvepole Creek
- Primary outflows: East Fork Twelvepole Creek
- Basin countries: United States
- Max. length: 12 mi (19 km)
- Max. width: less than 0.25 mi (400 m)
- Surface area: 1,005 acres (4 km^{2})
- Shore length^{1}: 44 mi (71 km) at summer pool
- Surface elevation: 662 ft (202 m) at summer pool 656 feet (200 m) at winter pool
- ^{1} Shore length is not a well-defined measure.

East Lynn Lake is a 1,005-acre (4 km^{2}) reservoir on the East Fork Twelvepole Creek in Wayne County, West Virginia. The lake is operated by the U.S. Army Corps of Engineers, Huntington District, as part of a series of flood control projects for the Ohio River basin.

== History ==
East Lynn Lake was originally authorized by the U.S. Congress in 1938 following the devastating Flood of 1937. Like many other projects authorized in this era, construction did not actually take place until much later. Construction occurred about 1969-1970 with the intended purposes of flood control, recreation, and fish and wildlife management. East Lynn Lake was established as the project's official name in 1971.

Construction of the lake resulted in the destruction of the town of Stiltner at the mouth of Brush Creek. It also required the relocation of a large stretch of West Virginia Route 37, which formerly followed the East Fork Twelvepole Creek valley that was inundated by the lake.

== Today ==
East Lynn Lake is home to 29 species of fish indigenous to southern West Virginia as well as carp and other non-native species. The lake is regularly stocked by the West Virginia Division of Natural Resources, which manages the lake and surrounding land as East Lynn Lake Wildlife Management Area.

The lake has wake-permitted and no-wake zones, making it popular for fishing and water skiing. The Army Corps of Engineers maintains several recreational areas including a campground at the lake. There is also a marina near the dam.

== Recreation ==
=== Fishing ===
Multiple West Virginia stage record fish were caught along the East Lynn Lake.

== See also ==
- List of lakes of West Virginia
