= Trout Pond =

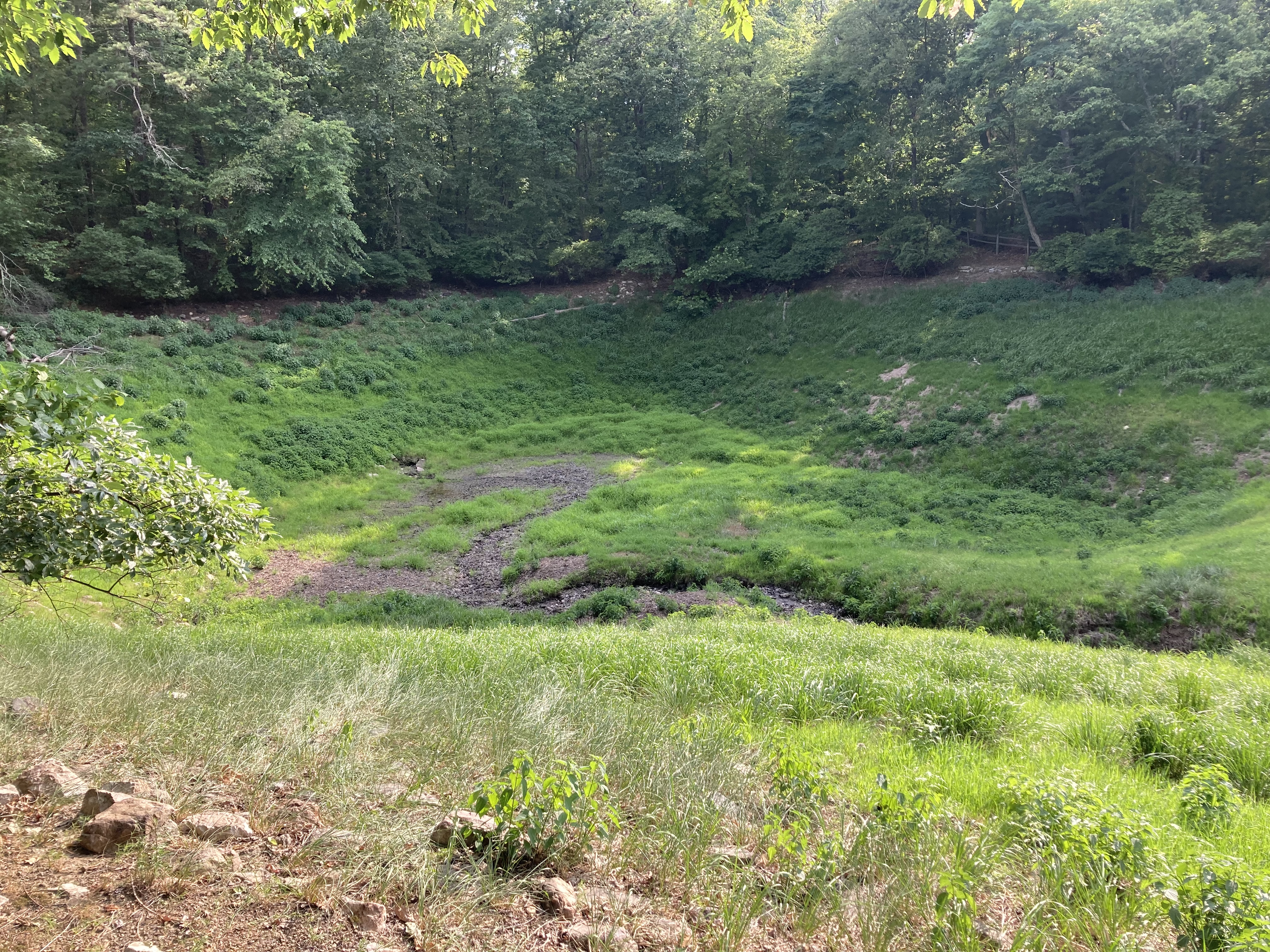
- Trout Pond photographed in 2024.

- Location within West Virginia
- Location: Hardy County, West Virginia
- Coordinates: 38.9551098°N 78.7361293°W
- Type: Natural lake
- Basin countries: United States
- Surface area: 0.5–3.0 acres (0.20–1.21 ha)
- Average depth: 12 ft (3.7 m) (historical)
- Max. depth: 36 ft (11 m) (historical)
- Surface elevation: 1,926 feet (587 m)
- Islands: None

Trout Pond — formerly called Old Pond — located near Wardensville in Hardy County, West Virginia, USA, is the state's only natural lake. The small "lake" is situated in the Trout Pond Recreation Area (TPRA) of the George Washington National Forest. Formerly, the pond had fluctuated in surface area between 2 and 3 acres (0.81 and 1.21 ha), but recently it has appeared to be disappearing due to underground structural changes.

== History ==
Trout Pond was created by a sinkhole that filled with water from a series of mountain streams running off Long Mountain (3,130 feet or 950 meters). Much of the region surrounding Trout Pond lies on layers of limestone that have been slowly eroded away by rainfall, causing conical holes to open up within the ground. Many of these sinkholes grow quite large with significant depths like Trout Pond, but because of its unique location, it had, until recently, been able to maintain a permanent status as a pond. In July 2002, Forest Service officials suspected that a shift in the limestone cavern underneath the sinkhole had caused the water level to drop. Within a month, it had drained almost dry. It has regenerated several times since then, during long spells of wet weather, but as soon as the rains stop it empties again.

== Geology ==
Trout Pond and its sinkhole are karst features. They are underlain by strata of Tonoloway Limestone and the Helderberg Group.

== TPRA ==
The facilities of the Trout Pond Recreation Area were constructed in the late 1970s. This National Forest campground has a designated swimming area, easy lakeside trails, and 50 campsites. The normal operating season is early May through the last Monday in October.

Trout Pond has long been stocked with trout, hence its current name. This was discontinued for a time, however, due to erosion of the banks caused by fishermen.

The Trout Pond Recreation Area Camping and Hiking Guide, the Great North Mountain Trail Guide, the Rockcliff Lake Stocking Schedule, and the Rockcliff Lake Sport Fish Identification can be found on Trout Pond WV - All of the Info on My Favorite Place.

== See also ==
- List of lakes of West Virginia
- List of sinkholes of the United States
