= Moses Fork =

Stream in Wayne County, West Virginia, U.S.

Coordinates: 37°59′47″N 82°24′09″W

Moses Fork is a stream in Wayne County, West Virginia, in the United States.

The name is probably biblical in origin.

== See also ==
- List of rivers of West Virginia
