= New Deal Resources in Cacapon State Park Historic District =

- U.S. National Register of Historic Places
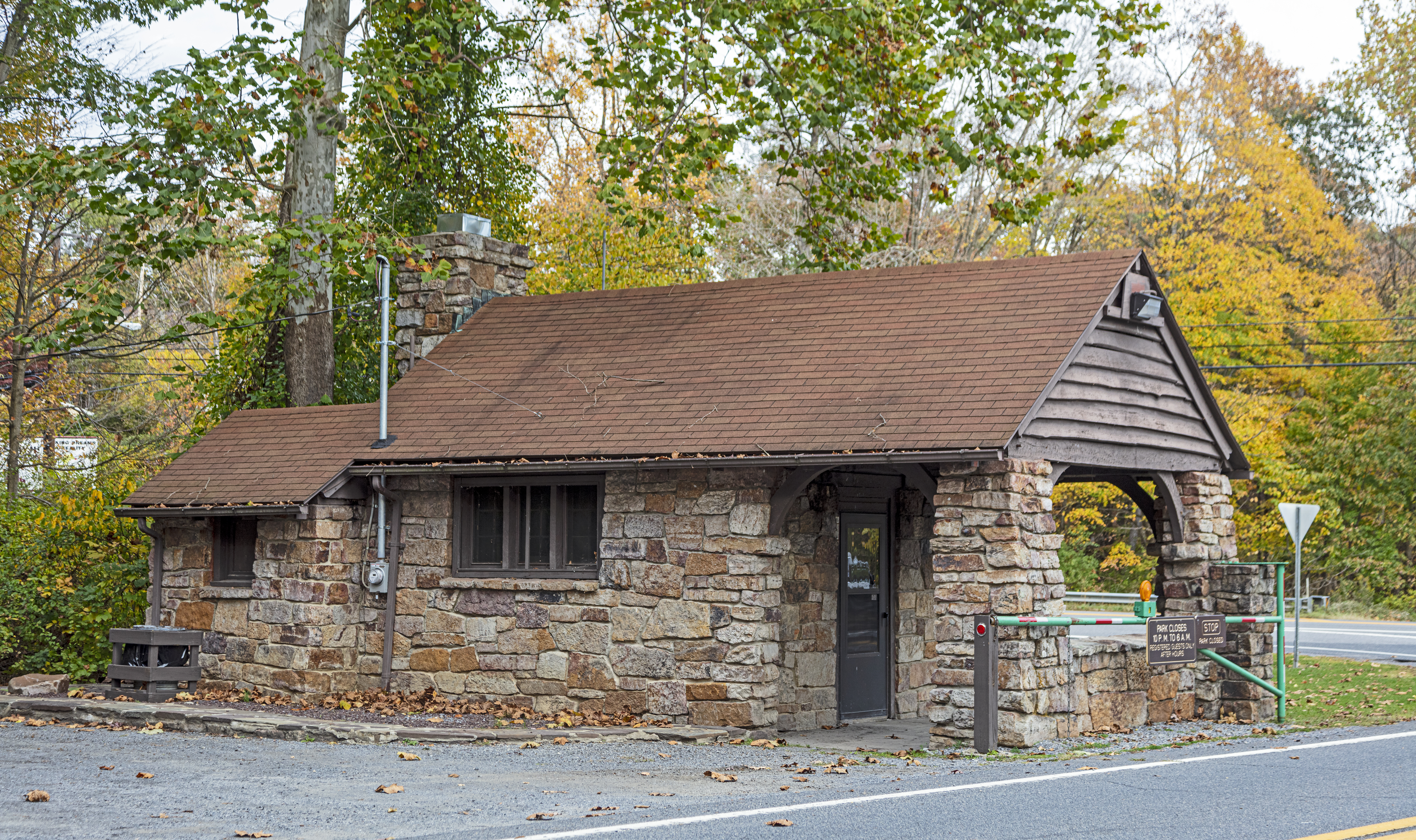
- Cacapon Resort state Park entrance building WV1

- Location within Eastern Panhandle of West Virginia Location within West Virginia Location within the United States
- Location: 818 Cacapon Lodge Drive
- Coordinates: 39°30′21″N 78°18′07″W
- Area: 6,115 acres (2,475 ha)
- Built: 1934
- NRHP reference No.: 100002853
- Added to NRHP: August 12, 2019

The Cacapon State Park Historic District is located in Cacapon Resort State Park, in Morgan County, West Virginia,11.4 miles south of Berkeley Springs. The developed part of the park attributed to the work of the CCC occupies approximately 2,500 acres within the center of the long, narrow district boundary. Densely forested, undeveloped natural areas lacking any amenities occupy the land to the north and south, with approximately 2,400 acres to the north and 1,200 to the south.

== History ==
Cacapon State Park was developed in partnership with the federal government through construction by the Civilian Conservation Corps (CCC) and design counsel from the National Park Service (NPS). The state of West Virginia purchased the land that became Cacapon State Park around 1933. As part of the New Deal, President Roosevelt combined the creation of jobs to spur the economy with programs to invest in public infrastructure across the nation. The CCC's work in Cacapon State Park addressed both environmental concerns and tourism. The CCC was responsible for building roads, trails, cabins, picnic shelters and other amenities including the Old Inn, which was the first lodge in the state's park system. All logs, stone and sand for the CCC construction was sourced locally. In 1936, plans for the dam to create Cacapon lake were approved by the state Public Service Commission.

The Cacapon State Park Historic District was listed on the National Register of Historic Places on August 12, 2019.
