= Upper Mud River Wildlife Management Area =

State Wildlife Management Area in Lincoln County, West Virginia

- IUCN category V (protected landscape/seascape)
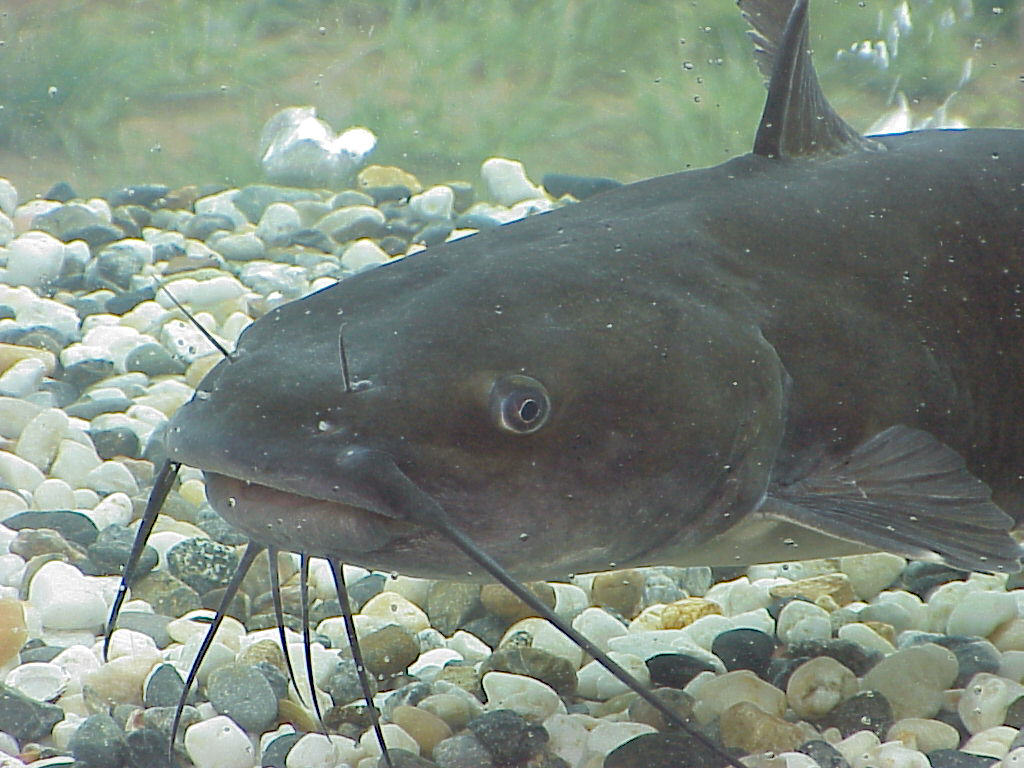
- Channel catfish (Ictalurus punctatus) may be found at the Upper Mud River WMA

- Location within West Virginia
- Location: Lincoln, West Virginia, United States
- Coordinates: 38°09′35″N 82°02′39″W
- Area: 1,425 acres (5.77 km^{2})
- Elevation: 743 ft (226 m)
- Operator: Wildlife Resources Section, WV Division of Natural Resources

Upper Mud River Wildlife Management Area, is located about 12 miles (19 km) south of Hamlin, West Virginia in Lincoln County, U.S.A. Upper Mud River WMA is located on 1,425 acres (577 ha) of steeply forested terrain.

The WMA is accessed from County Route 7 (Upper Mud River Road) about 12 miles (19 km) south of Hamlin.

== Hunting and Fishing ==
Hunting opportunities in the WMA include deer, grouse, rabbit, raccoon, squirrel, turkey, and waterfowl.

The 306-acre (124 ha) lake at Upper Mud River WMA provides fishing opportunities for largemouth bass, bluegill, channel catfish, crappie, and muskellunge.

Amenities at the WMA include a swimming beach with a bath house, picnic areas, playgrounds, a softball field, and restrooms. However, camping is not available at the WMA.

== See also ==
- Animal conservation
- Hunting
- fishing
- List of West Virginia wildlife management areas
