= List of West Virginia State Fishing Records =

This list of West Virginia State Fishing Records includes all major records of the largest fish of each species taken by hook and line in West Virginia waters. All records are obtained from official West Virginia Department of Natural Resources sources.

== Records ==
Species	Year	Total Length (Inches)	Total Weight (Pounds)	Location	Angler	Record	Reference
Largemouth Bass	1994	24.8	12.28	Pond - Grant Co.	David W. Heeter	Weight	
Largemouth Bass	2025	26.26	9.85	Pond - Harrison Co.	Seth Spry	Length	
Smallmouth Bass	1971	24.25	9.75	South Branch	David Lindsay	Weight	
Smallmouth Bass	1976	25.5	7.5	New River	Franklin J. Elliott	Length	
Rock Bass	1964	13.8	1.75	Big Sandy Creek	Warren Ryan		
Spotted Bass	1988	19.0	3.82	R.D. Bailey Lake	Leonard Blankenship	Length -Tie	
Spotted Bass	2000	19.0	4.77	R.D. Bailey Lake	Kevin Dameron	Weight	
Striped Bass	2010	47.16	45.70	Bluestone Lake	James Brooks		
Hybrid Striped Bass	1985	31.5	16.75	Kanawha River	Robert Honaker	Weight	
Hybrid Striped Bass	2000	32.1	14	Kanawha River	Frankie Harris	Length	
White Bass	1985	20.0	4.56	New River	Louis Puskas		
Bluegill / Hybrid Bluegill	1964	13.75	2.25	Pond - Fayette Co.	Dennis Criss	Length	
Bluegill / Hybrid Bluegill	1986	11.7	2.75	Pond - Randolph Co.	Mark Allan Lewis	Weight	
Redbreast Sunfish	2024	9.29	0.57	New Creek Lake	Zach Adkins		
Redear Sunfish	2025	12.44	1.6	Plum Orchard Lake	John Plott	Length	
Redear Sunfish	2024	12.0	1.75	Plum Orchard Lake	John Plott	Weight	
Pumpkinseed	BE THE FIRST (minimum of 9 inches) new category as of 2026						
Bowfin	1994	32.25	7.54	Pond - Berkeley Co.	Donald E. Newcomb, III	Length	
Bowfin	2024	30.2	10.6	Ohio River	Lauren Noble	Weight	
Buffalo	1976	41.0	38.0	Little Kanawha River	Hobert Null		
Common Carp	2022	41.2	45.2	Summersville Lake	Ayden Minick	Length	
Common Carp	1998	39.3	47.0	Pond - Preston Co.	Gary Johnson	Weight	
Grass Carp	2020	54.75	67.4	Warden Lake	John Miller	Length	
Grass Carp	2005	50.75	71.69	Warden Lake	William R. Turner	Weight	
Blue Catfish	2025	51.49	66.3	Kanawha River	Justin Connor	Length	
Blue Catfish	2023	50.51	69.45	Ohio River	Michael John Drake	Weight	
Bullhead Catfish	1977	22.75	6.1	Tygart Lake Headwaters	Gary R. Freeman		
Channel Catfish	2024	43.51	46.7	Pond - Wayne Co.	John Tyler Rutherford		
Flathead Catfish	1956	52.0	70.0	Little Kanawha River	L.L. McClung		
Chain Pickerel	2019	27.87	4.0	Upper Deckers Lake	Matt Born	Length	
Chain Pickerel	2001	27.75	6.19	Tuckahoe Lake	Steven Demma	Weight	
Black Crappie	2024	17.76	3.15	Woodrum Lake	Dwight Priestly	Length	
Black Crappie	2025	17.7	3.6	East Lynn Lake	Jerry Porter	Weight	
White Crappie	1971	19.75	4.05	Meathouse Fork	Leonard Edgell		
Eel	1983	44.25	6.27	Elk River	Steve Woods	Length	
Eel	1977	44.0	7.25	Bunker Hill Quarry	Arlie R. Ruble	Weight	
Fallfish	1970	21.25	3.5	North Fork of South Branch	James Blackwell		
Freshwater Drum	1954	37	25	Little Kanawha River	Bill Dawkins	Length	
Freshwater Drum	2021	35.59	27.88	Kanawha River	John A. Gibson	Weight	
Longnose Gar	2023	53.62	15.0	Ohio River	Rich Chapman	Length	
Longnose Gar	1993	50.5	19.08	Kanawha River	Michael Shan Casey	Weight	
Goldeye	1983	18.5	3.0	Ohio River	Delbert McWilliams		
Muskellunge	2022	55.0625	51.00	Little Kanawha River	Lucas King		
Northern Pike	1989	42.6	22.06	Dog Run Lake	Boyd O. Pratt, Sr.		
Redhorse	2025	24.57	5.75	Ohio River	Jason Floyd		
Sauger	1985	23.0	4.75	Ohio River	Steve Powell	Length	
Sauger	2012	22.50	5.06	Ohio River	David L. Vance	Weight	
Saugeye	2006	27.68	8.73	East Lynn Lake	Everett Chapman		
Skipjack	2021	20.15	3.1	Ohio River	Ethan Moss		
Tiger Musky	1994	49.25	36.5	Mountwood Lake	Clyde E. Beckett		
Brook Trout	1981	23.5	4.78	Lost River	Jack E. Foltz	Length	
Brook Trout	2004	22.25	7.64	Shavers Fork of Cheat River	Gary M. Chapman	Weight	
Brown Trout	1968	32.0	16.0	South Branch	Paul Barker		
Golden Rainbow Trout	1987	27.5	8.63	Stonecoal Lake	Gerald Estep	Length	
Golden Rainbow Trout	2023	26.25	9.72	Little Beaver Lake	Charles Lilly, Jr.	Weight	
Rainbow Trout	2014	33.11	19.40	Pond - Berkely Co.	Eric Files, Sr.		
Tiger Trout	2011	28.7	10.65	Krodel Lake	Mike Connolly	Length	
Tiger Trout	2025	27.6	12.55	Mannington Lake	Robert Riggs	Weight	
Walleye	1976	35.0	15.0	Kanawha Falls	Fred Cline	Length	
Walleye	2004	30.87	18.97	Elk River	Jerry Rose	Weight	
Yellow perch	2010	15.44	1.20	Summersville Lake	Craig Hollandsworth	Length	
Yellow perch	2018	14.5	2.04	Summersville Lake	Clinton Mills	Weight	
