= Bear Rocks Lake Wildlife Management Area =

State Wildlife Management Area in Ohio County, West Virginia

Bear Rock Lakes Wildlife Management Area
- IUCN category V (protected landscape/seascape)
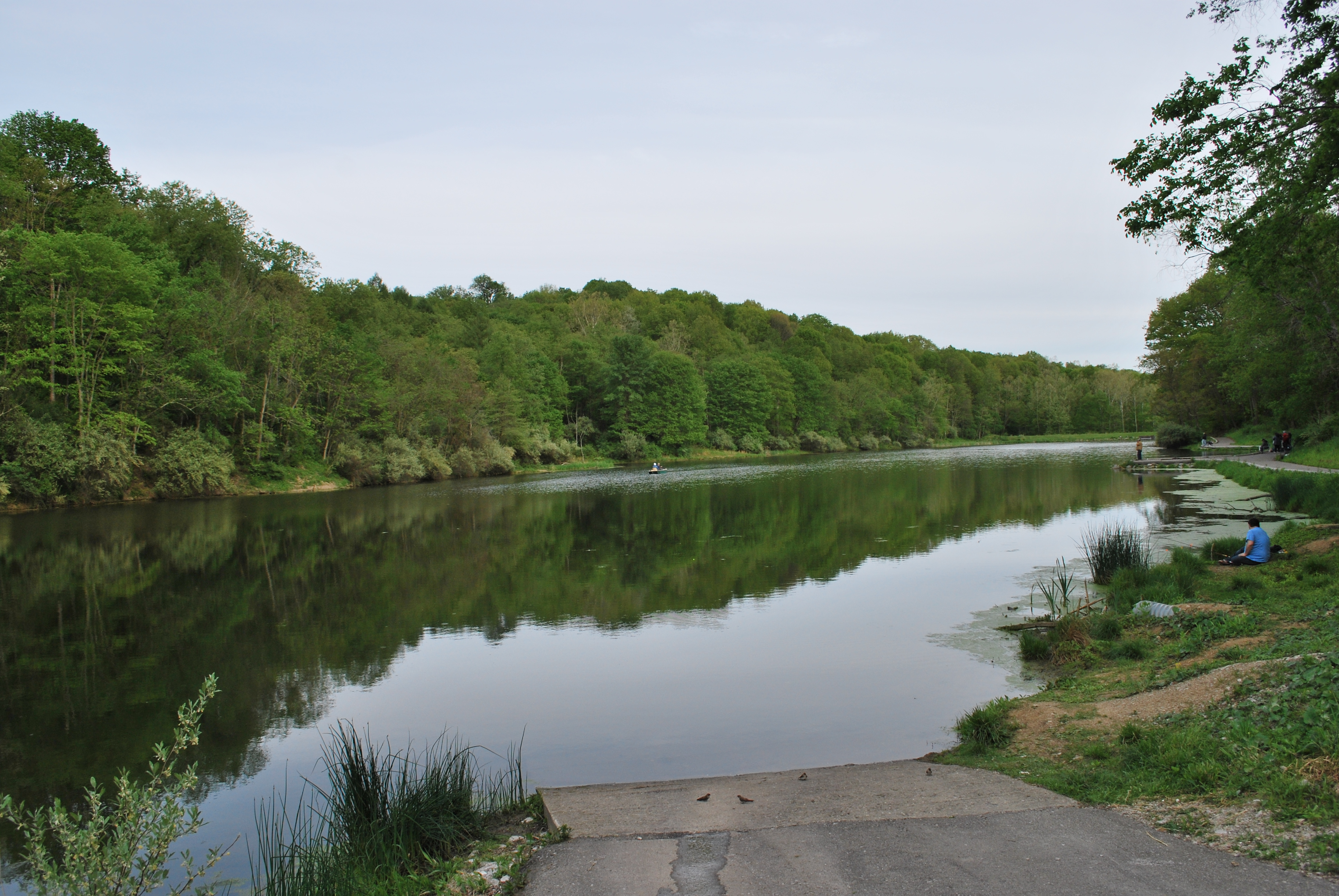
- Bear Lake, one of three lakes in the WMA

- Location within West Virginia
- Location: Ohio, West Virginia, United States
- Coordinates: 40°04′53″N 80°32′07″W
- Area: 242 acres (98 ha)
- Operator: Wildlife Resources Section, WVDNR

Bear Rock Lakes Wildlife Management Area is a 242-acre (98 ha) protected area located in Ohio County, West Virginia, about 8 miles (13 km) east of Wheeling. The terrain at Bear Rock Lakes is rolling hills covered by a combination of hardwood forest and open fields.

From Valley Grove on U.S. Route 40, turn south on Valley Grove Road. Follow Valley Grove Road about a mile. Immediately after passing underneath I-70, turn left on Bear Rock Lane. Follow Bear Rock Lane to the wildlife area.

== Hunting and Fishing ==
Hunting opportunities include rabbit, waterfowl, deer, squirrel, and turkey. The WMA contains four fishing lakes, 8-acre (3.2 ha) Bear Lake, 4-acre (1.6 ha) Rock Lake, 3.4-acre (1.4 ha) Baker Lake, and 0.5-acre (0.20 ha) Wood Pond. Fishing opportunities in the Bear Rock Lakes include stocked trout, largemouth bass, bluegill and channel catfish. Bear Lake has a handicapped accessible fishing trail. Boating, with electric motors only, is permitted on Bear Lake. Wood Pond is designated for Class Q licences only. Fishing with minnows is prohibited.

== See also ==
- Animal conservation
- List of West Virginia wildlife management areas
- Recreational fishing
