= Glade Creek (New River tributary) =

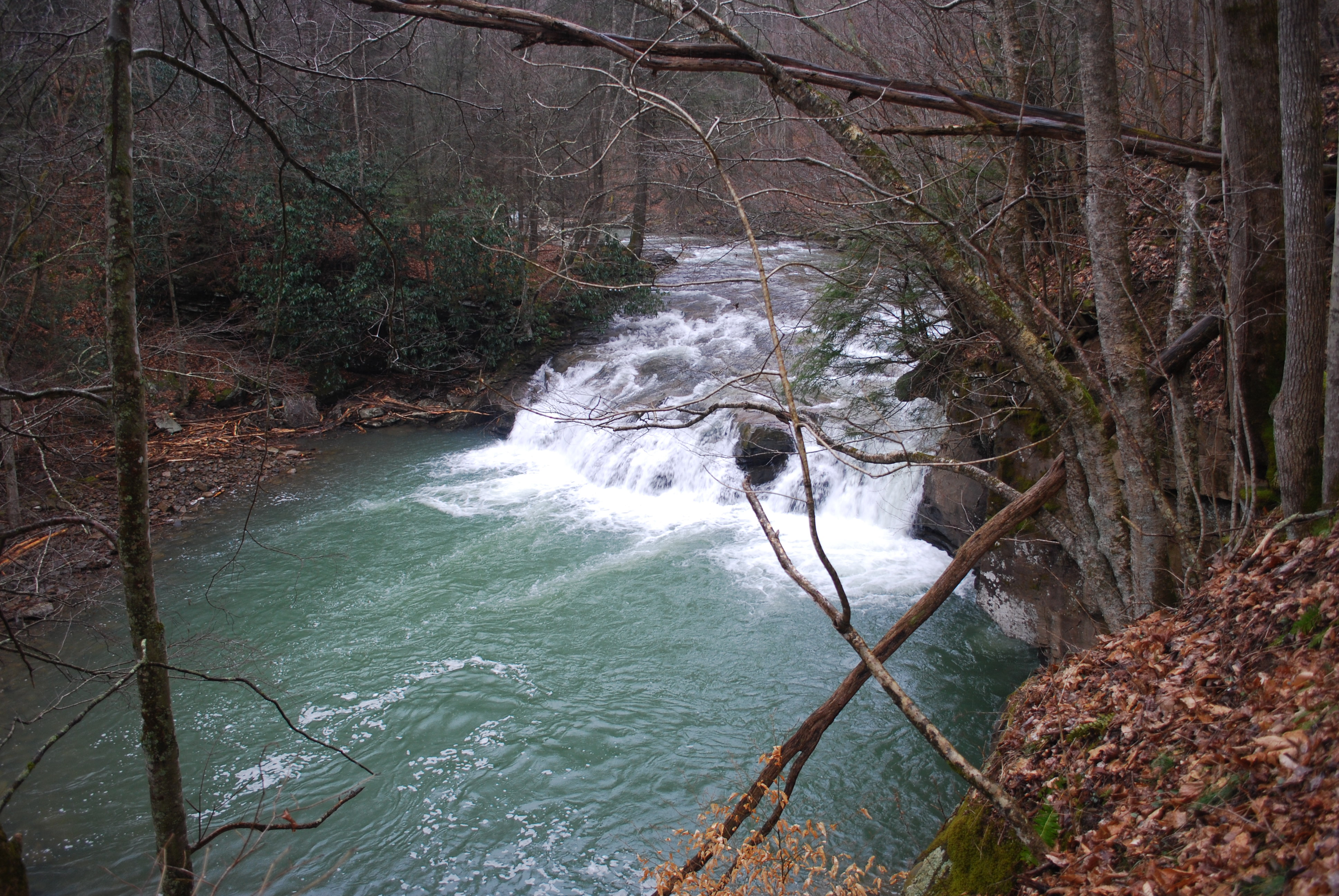
- Waterfalls along Glade Creek

Location
- Country: United States
- State: West Virginia
- Counties: Raleigh

Physical characteristics
- Source: Flat Top Mountain
  - location: Raleigh County, WV
  - coordinates: 37°35′25″N 81°05′41″W
  - elevation: 3,271 ft (997 m)
- Mouth: New River
  - location: Raleigh County, WV
  - coordinates: 37°49′47″N 81°00′46″W
  - elevation: 1,207 ft (368 m)

Glade Creek is a major tributary of the New River in Raleigh County, West Virginia. Glade Creek lies within the largest side valley off New River in the New River Gorge National River area.

== Sources ==
Glade Creek is formed on Flat Top Mountain just north of the point where Raleigh, Summers and Mercer counties intersect. Just north of its source near Ghent, it is impounded to form Flat Top Lake. Further north, it is again impounded to form Glade Creek Reservoir.

== Canyon ==
Immediately north of Glade Creek Reservoir, Glade Creek begins its canyon section. The canyon varies from about 200 feet (61 m) in depth at its upstream end to over 1,200 feet (370 m) deep near its mouth at the New River southeast of Prince.

Much of the lower canyon is traversed by an abandoned railroad bed. Today, this former railbed is maintained as a hiking trail by New River Gorge National River.

== Phil G. McDonald Bridge ==
Approximately 5 miles (8.0 km) upstream of its mouth, Glade Creek is crossed by Interstate 64 on the Phil G. McDonald Memorial Bridge, also known as the Glade Creek Bridge. This 2,179-foot (664 m) long deck truss bridge towers 700 feet (210 m) above the creek bed, and was the highest Interstate bridge in the United States before the Mike O'Callaghan–Pat Tillman Memorial Bridge was designated as part of Interstate 11 in 2018.

== See also ==
- List of rivers of West Virginia
