= Plum Orchard Lake =

- Location within West Virginia
- Location: Fayette County, West Virginia
- Coordinates: 37.9512221°N 81.2298272°W
- Type: reservoir
- Primary inflows: Plum Orchard Creek
- Primary outflows: Plum Orchard Creek
- Basin countries: United States
- Surface area: 202 acres (0.8 km^{2})
- Average depth: 15 ft (5 m)
- Max. depth: 40 ft (12 m)
- Surface elevation: 1,736 feet (529 m)

Plum Orchard Lake is a 202-acre (0.8 km^{2}) reservoir in the Plum Orchard Wildlife Management Area in Fayette County, West Virginia. The reservoir is the result of an impoundment on Plum Orchard Creek. Plum Orchard Lake was constructed in 1962 with a maximum depth of 40 feet (12 m) and an average depth of 15 feet (5 m).

Plum Orchard Lake is a popular location for fishing and boating. In the summer its surface is covered by native white water lilies and watershield and pink water lilies believed to have naturalized from an 1970s ornamental planting.
