= Castleman Run Lake Wildlife Management Area =

Wildlife area in West Virginia, US

- IUCN category V (protected landscape/seascape)
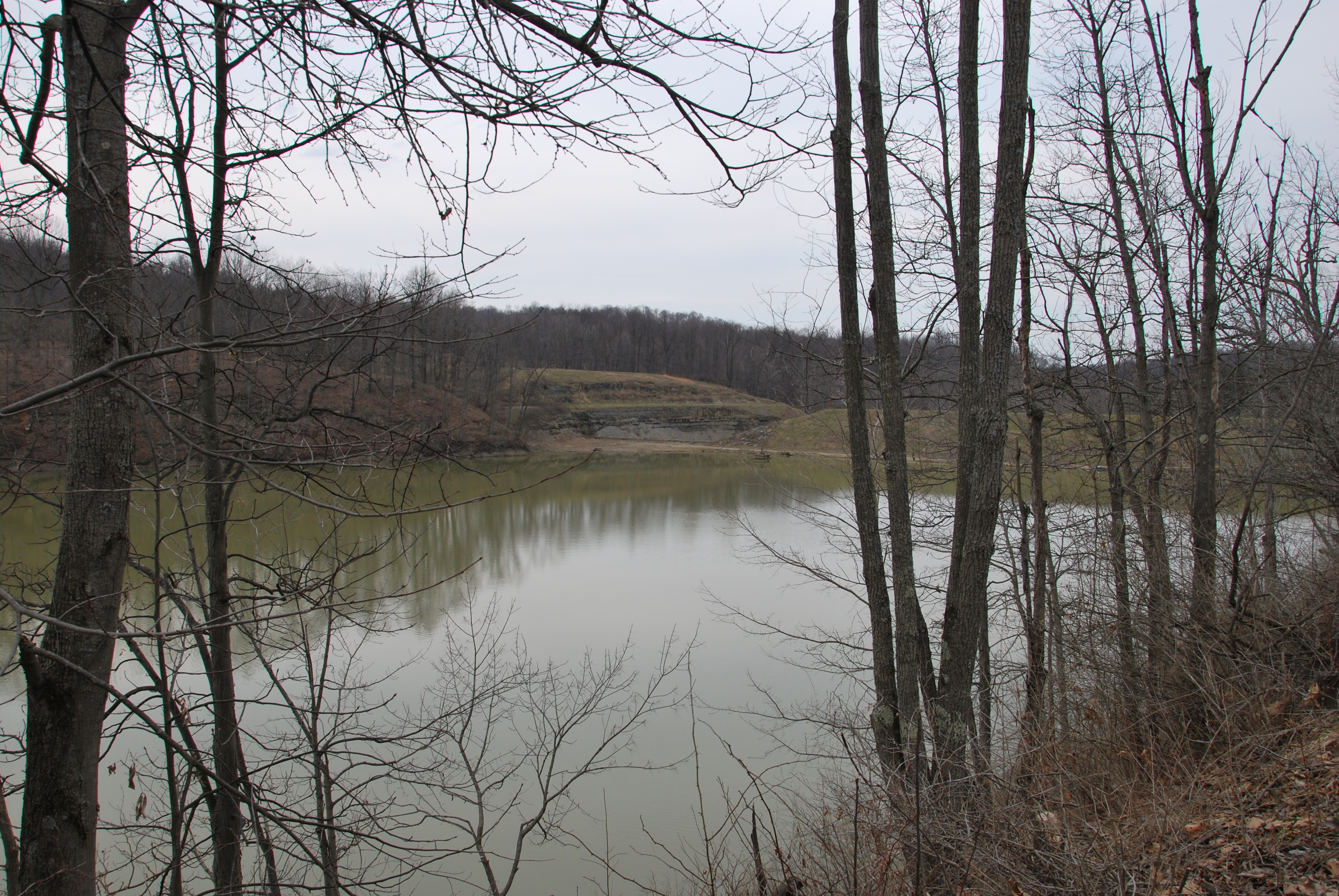
- Castleman Run Lake

- Location within West Virginia
- Location: West Virginia, United States
- Coordinates: 40°09′38″N 80°31′56″W
- Area: 486 acres (197 ha)
- Elevation: 940 ft (290 m)

Castleman Run Lake Wildlife Management Area is located on 486 acres (197 ha) near in Brooke and Ohio counties near Bethany, West Virginia. The moderate slopes are covered with mixed hardwoods, brushy vegetation, and open fields. The WMA is located about 3 miles (4.8 km) south of Bethany on Castleman Run Road.

== Hunting and fishing ==
Hunting opportunities, limited by the small size of the area, include deer, raccoon, squirrel, turkey, and grouse. Fishing opportunities includes largemouth bass, bluegill, catfish, muskellunge, tiger musky, northern pike, and trout. Boating, with electric motors only, is permitted on the small lake. Camping is prohibited at this WMA.

== See also ==
- Animal conservation
- Hunting
- List of West Virginia wildlife management areas
- Recreational fishing
