= Camp Caesar =

- U.S. National Register of Historic Places
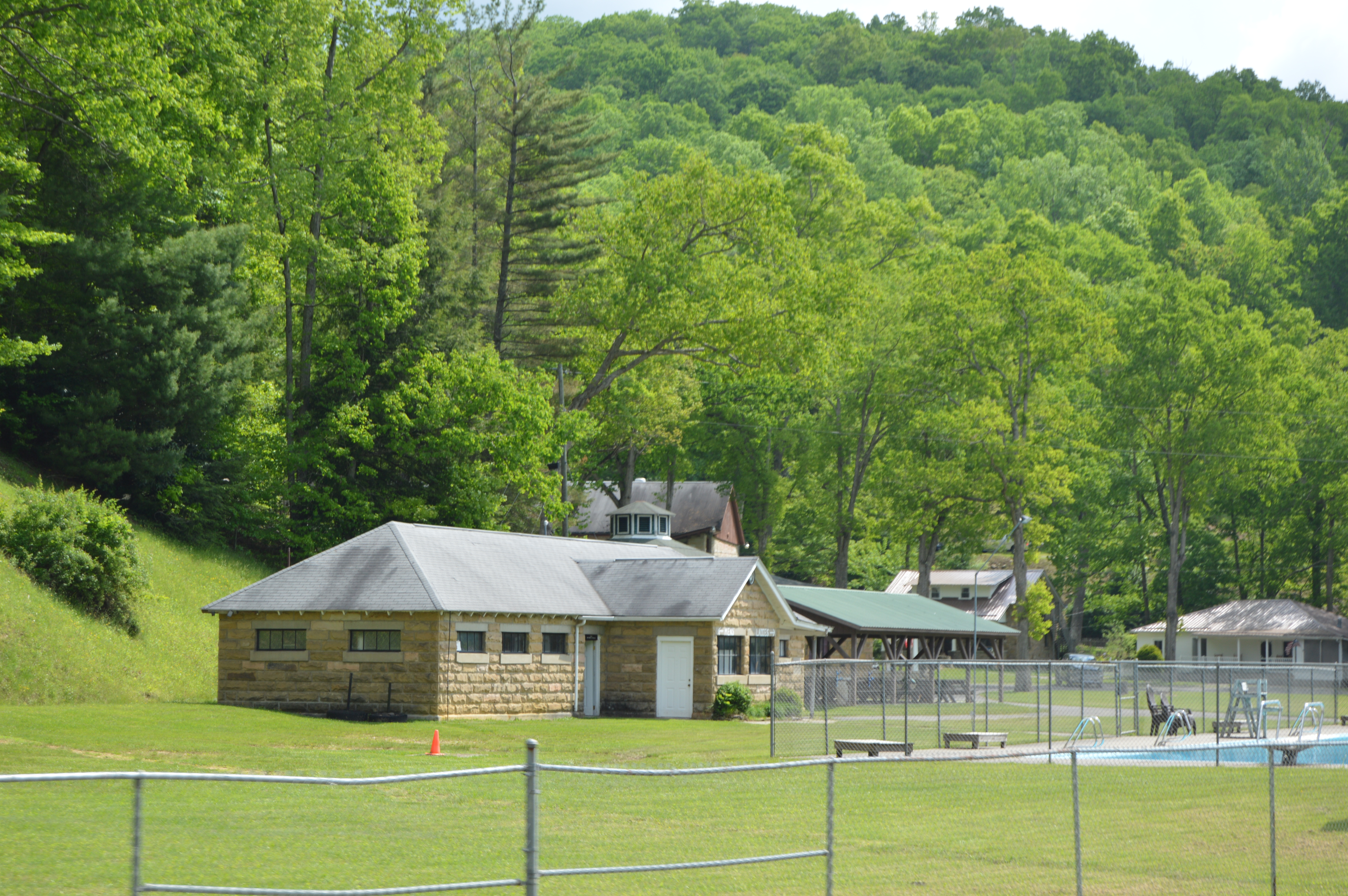
- Roadside view

- Location within West Virginia Location within the United States
- Location: 4868 Webster Road, Cowen, West Virginia
- Coordinates: 38°24′33.22″N 80°33′5.95″W
- Area: 1 acre (0.40 ha)
- Built: 1922
- Architect: Works Progress Administration
- Architectural style: Bungalow/ Craftsman, Modern Movement
- NRHP reference No.: 09001197
- Added to NRHP: December 30, 2009

Camp Caesar, also known as the Webster County 4-H Camp, is a historic campsite located at Cowen, Webster County, West Virginia. It has 20 contributing buildings, 5 contributing sites, 13 contributing structures, and 3 contributing objects. The camp was established in 1922 by local members of the Farm Bureau and the Webster County extension agent, Julius A. Wolfram. During the 1920s, an octagonal assembly hall now known as Gregory Hall, a council circle, a dining hall, and a home for the camp caretaker were constructed. After the onset of the Great Depression, the Works Progress Administration built several stone cottages, a pool and poolhouse, dining hall expansion, stone walks, retaining walls, and other features.

It was listed on the National Register of Historic Places in 2009.
