= Cacapon Resort State Park =

State Park in Morgan County, West Virginia

- IUCN category V (protected landscape/seascape)
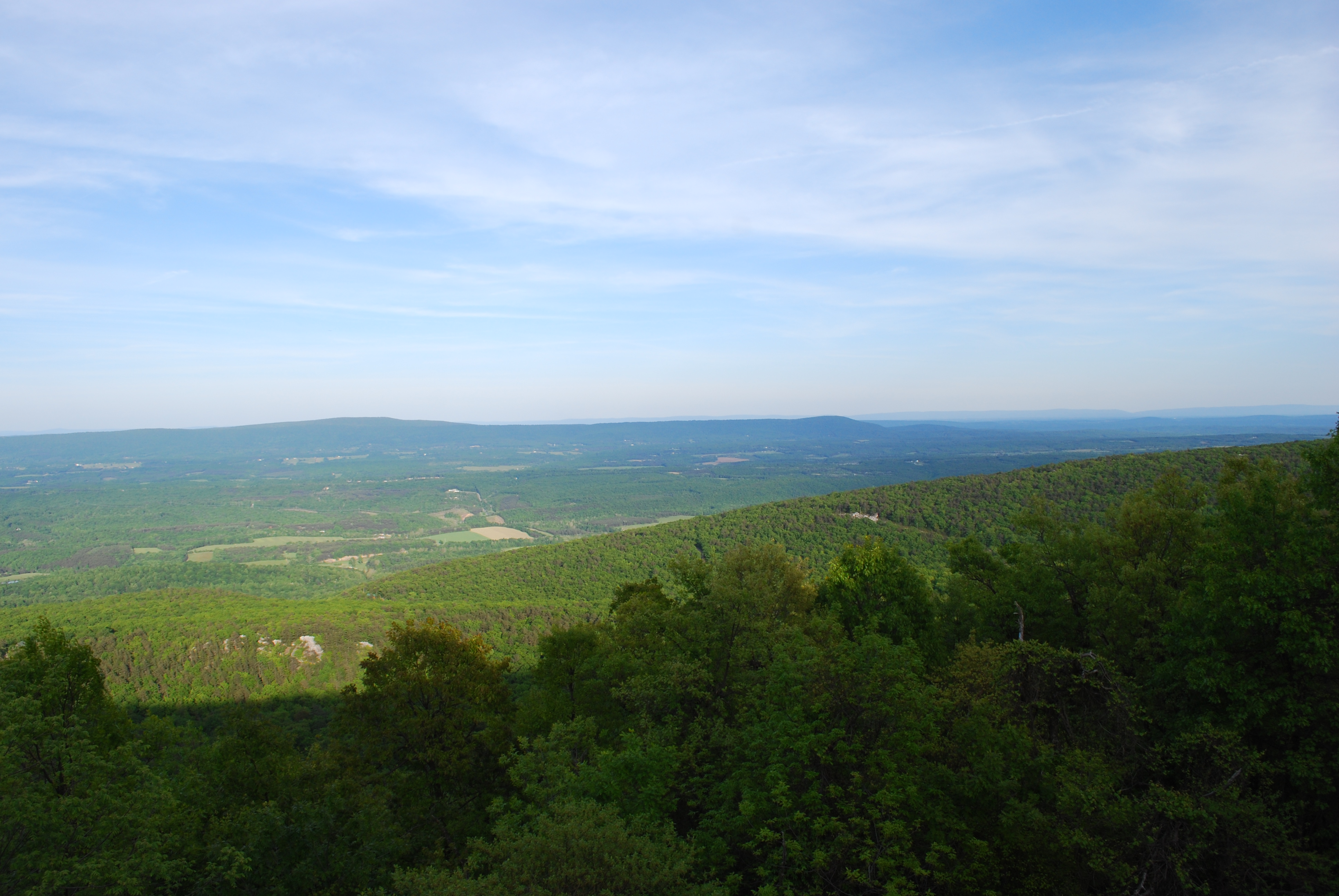
- Looking southeast from atop Cacapon Mountain

- Location within West Virginia
- Location: Morgan, West Virginia, United States
- Coordinates: 39°30′21″N 78°18′00″W
- Area: 6,115 acres (24.75 km^{2})
- Elevation: 948 ft (289 m)
- Established: 1937-07-01
- Website: wvstateparks.com/park/cacapon-resort-state-park/

Opened in 1933, the 6,115-acre (2,475 ha) Cacapon Resort State Park is located on the eastern slopes of Cacapon Mountain in Morgan County, West Virginia, USA. Panorama Overlook, at the southern end of the park and 2,320 feet (710 m) above sea level, is the highest point in the park and in Morgan County.

== Features ==
- 124-room Lodge (Renovated in 2021)
- 12-room Old Inn
- 25 cabins (two fully accessible for disabled people)
- Efficiency bungalows
- Full-service restaurant
- Healing Waters Spa
- 18-hole, par 72 golf course, designed by Robert Trent Jones
- Lake swimming
- Rowboat and paddle boat rentals
- Shooting Range
- Horseback riding
- Fishing
- Conference rooms
- Picnic Shelters
- Gift Shop
- Tennis courts
- Basketball court
- Volleyball court
- Bicycle trails
- 18-basket Disc golf course
- Nearby activities

== Accessibility ==
Accessibility for the disabled was assessed by West Virginia University. The assessment found the campground, picnic areas, and lake swimming to be accessible. During the 2005 assessment some issues were identified concerning signage and the width of the sidewalk to the playground. Two of the newest park cabins were specifically designed to be accessible.

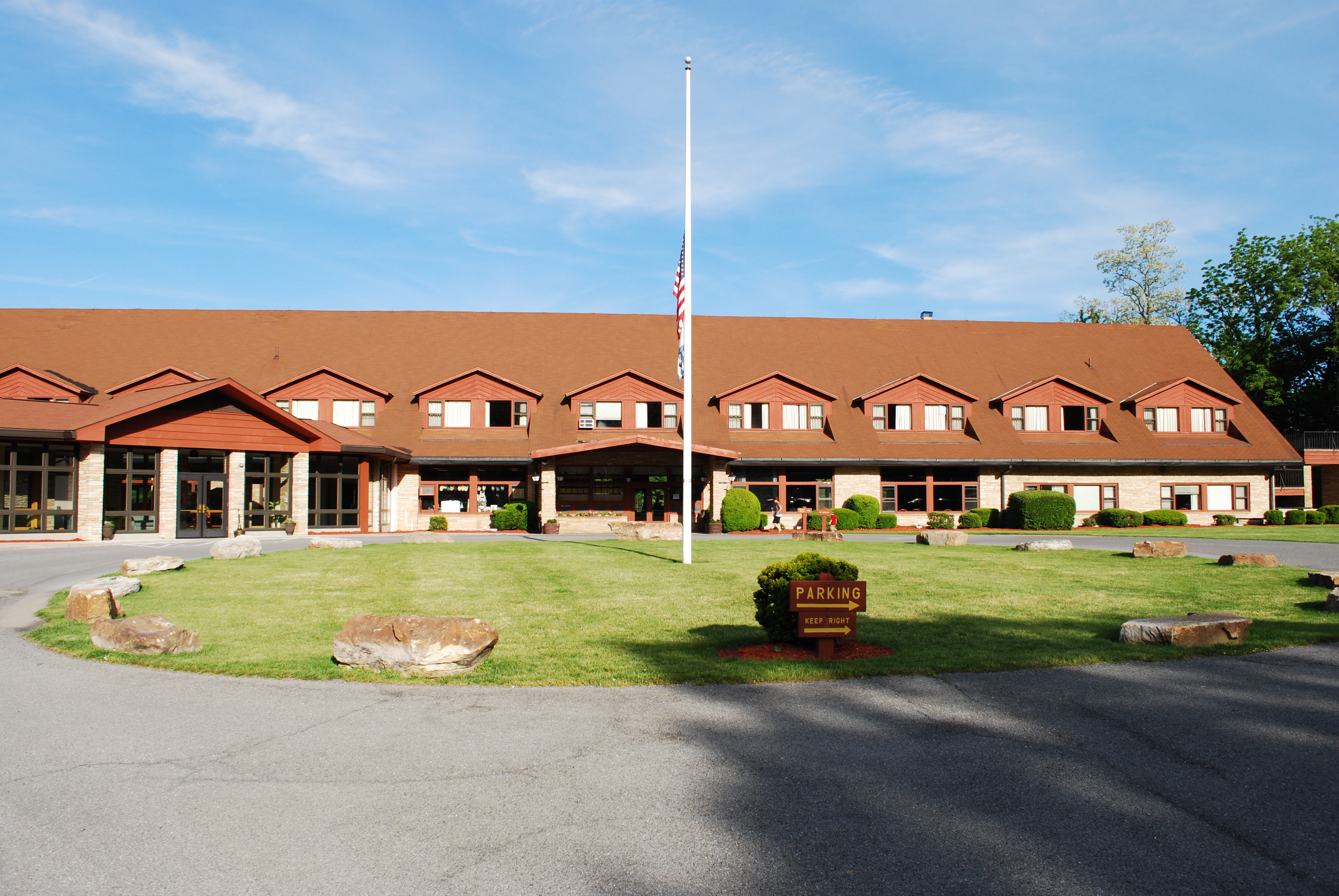
Lodge

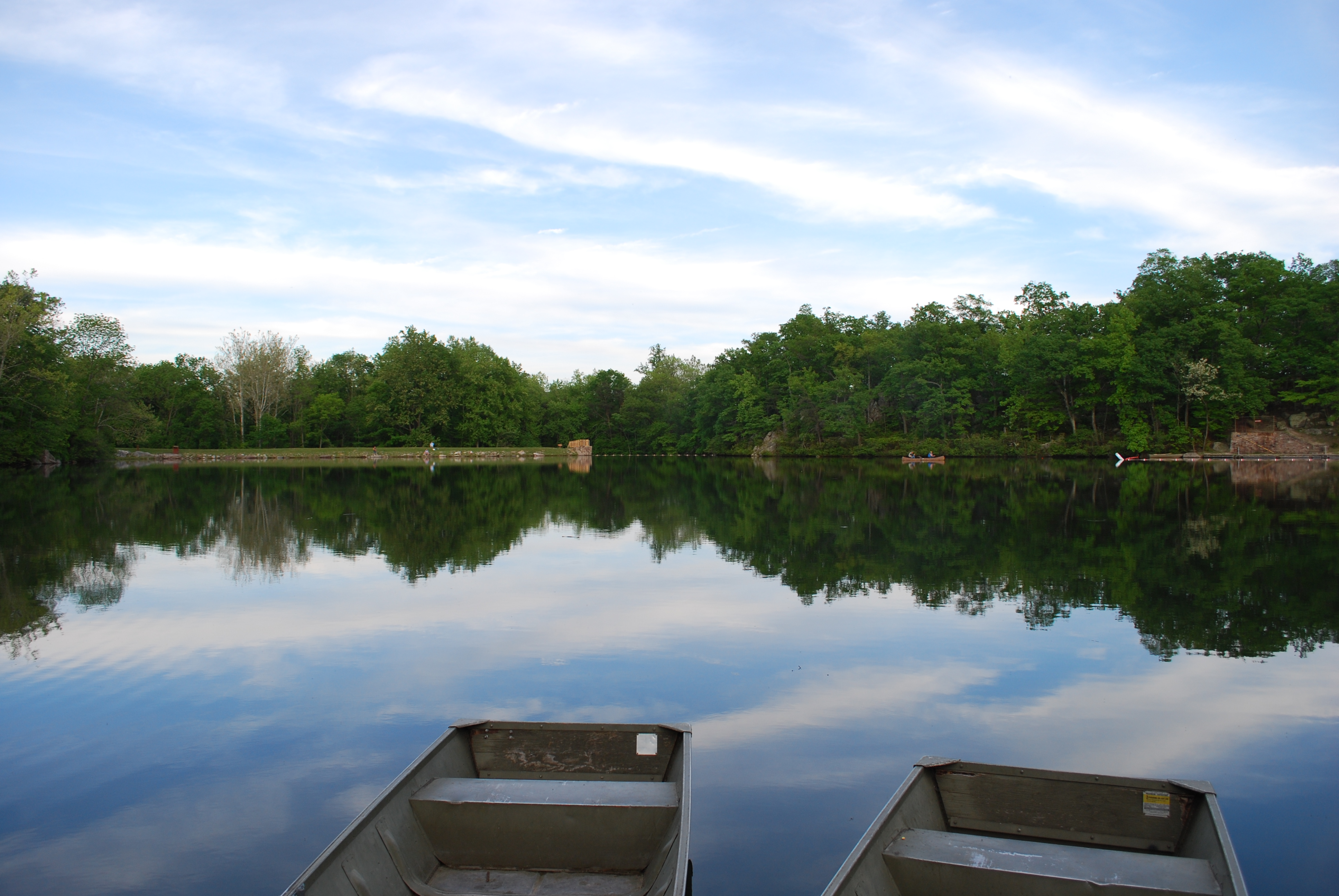
Lake near entrance to park

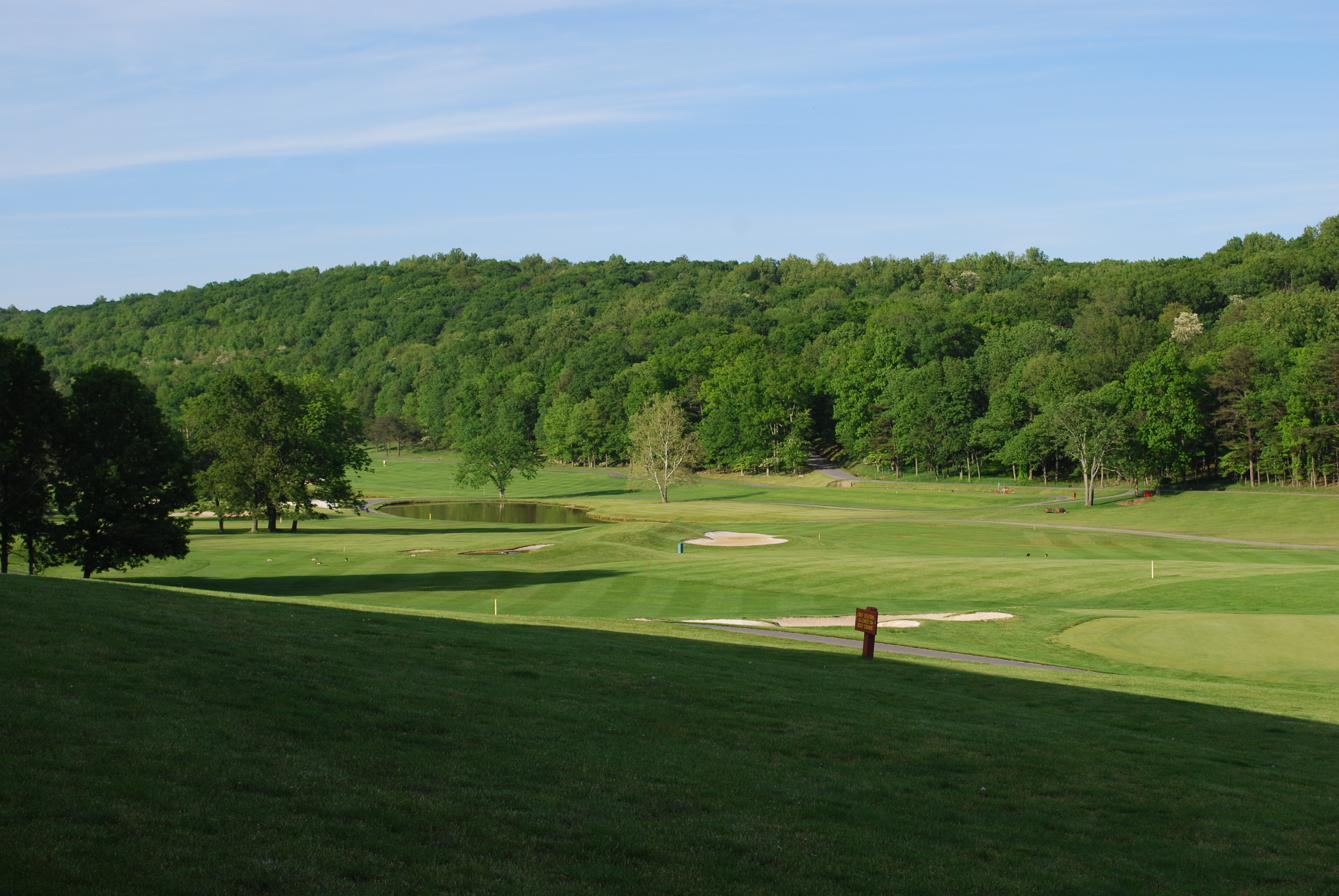
Golf course

== History ==
In 2019 the New Deal Resources were added to the National Register of Historic Places as the New Deal Resources in Cacapon State Park Historic District

== See also ==
- List of West Virginia state parks
