= Spruce Knob Lake (West Virginia) =

- Location within West Virginia Location within the United States
- Location: Randolph County, West Virginia
- Coordinates: 38.70276°N 79.58839°W
- Type: reservoir
- Basin countries: United States
- Surface area: 23 acres (0.093 km^{2})
- Surface elevation: 3,840 ft (1,170 m)

== Overview ==
Spruce Knob Lake is a 23-acre (0.093 km^{2}) reservoir located within the Monongahela National Forest in Randolph County, West Virginia, USA. The recreation area surrounding Spruce Knob Lake contains camping and picnicking facilities as well as a boating site. At an elevation of 3,840 feet, it is the highest lake in West Virginia.

== Access ==
The lake can best be reached by traveling 9.5 miles south of Whitmer on County Route 29 and then 2 miles east of Forest Service Route 1.

== See also ==
- Spruce Knob
