= Pipestem Creek =

Stream in West Virginia, U.S.

Coordinates: 37°36′36″N 80°55′00″W

Pipestem Creek is a stream in the U.S. state of West Virginia.

Pipestem Creek was named for the fact early settlers fashioned pipe stems from a plant which grew along the creek's banks.

== See also ==
- List of rivers of West Virginia
