= Birch River (West Virginia) =

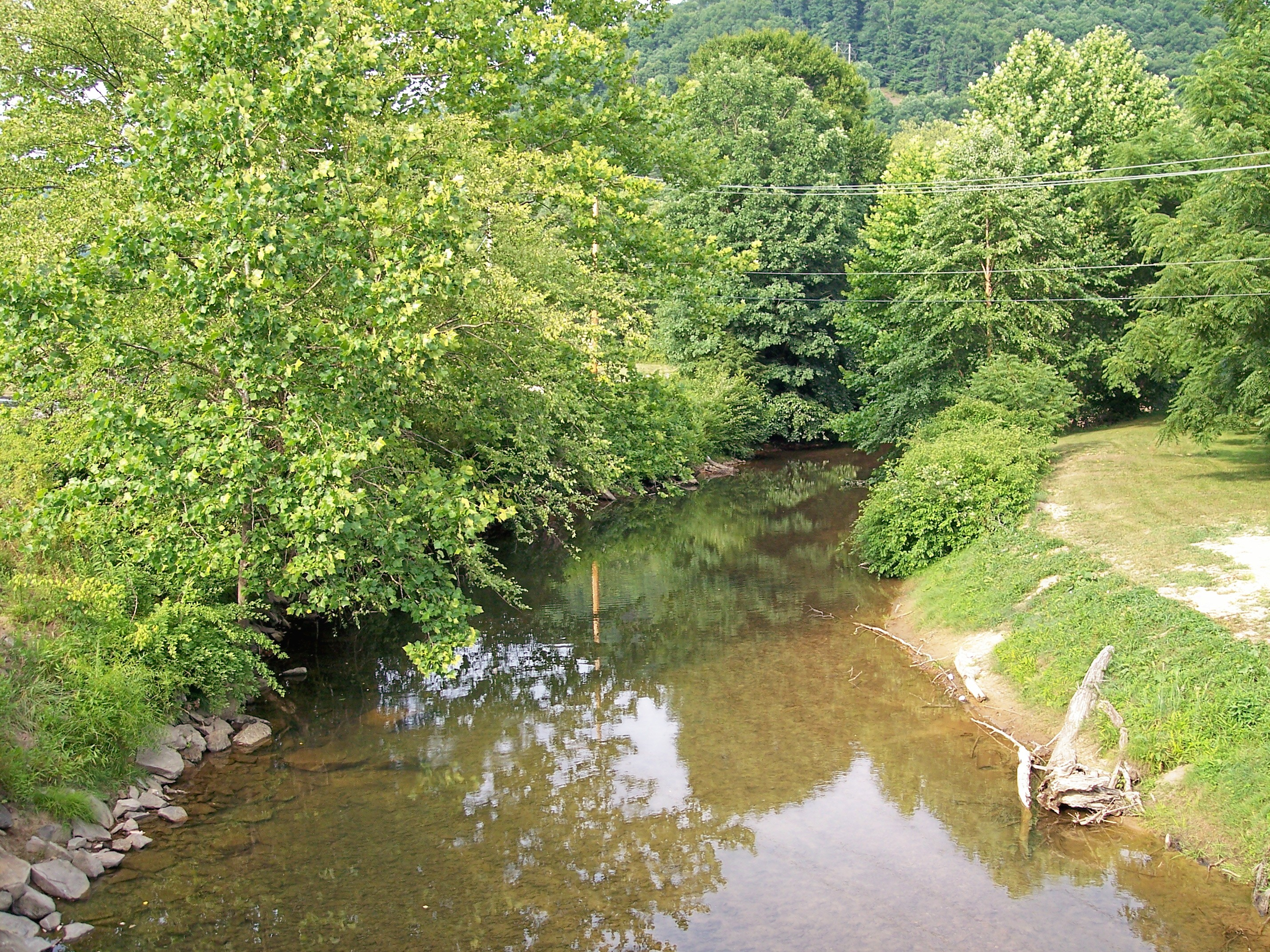
- The Birch River in the community of Birch River in Nicholas County in 2007

- Location of mouth in West Virginia

Location
- Country: United States
- State: West Virginia

Physical characteristics
- Mouth
  - coordinates: 38°35′32″N 80°53′04″W

Basin features
- River system: Elk River

The Birch River is a tributary of the Elk River in rural central West Virginia in the United States, on the unglaciated Allegheny Plateau. It rises near the town of Cowen in western Webster County, and flows generally WNW through northern Nicholas County and southern Braxton County, where it joins the Elk. Tributaries are Millcreek, Polemic Creek, and Skyles Creek.

The river most likely was named after birch trees lining its banks.

== Little Birch River ==
Mouth: 38°33′27″N 80°47′06″W

The Little Birch River is a tributary of the Birch. It rises in western Webster County and flows generally westward through southern Braxton County.

== See also ==
- List of West Virginia rivers
