= Warden Lake =

- Location within West Virginia
- Location: Hardy County, West Virginia
- Coordinates: 39.1314943°N 78.5966789°W
- Type: reservoir
- Basin countries: United States
- Surface elevation: 1,286 feet (392 m)

Warden Lake is a reservoir on Moores Run (a Cacapon River tributary) near Wardensville in northern Hardy County, West Virginia, United States. Warden Lake is located within the Warden Lake Wildlife Management Area nestled between Baker Mountain (2,024 ft; 617 m) and Big Ridge (1,995 ft; 608 m).

== Recreation ==
=== Fishing ===
Multiple West Virginia stage record fish were caught along the Warden Lake.
