= Stonecoal Lake Wildlife Management Area =

State Wildlife Management Area in Lewis and Upshur counties, West Virginia

- IUCN category V (protected landscape/seascape)
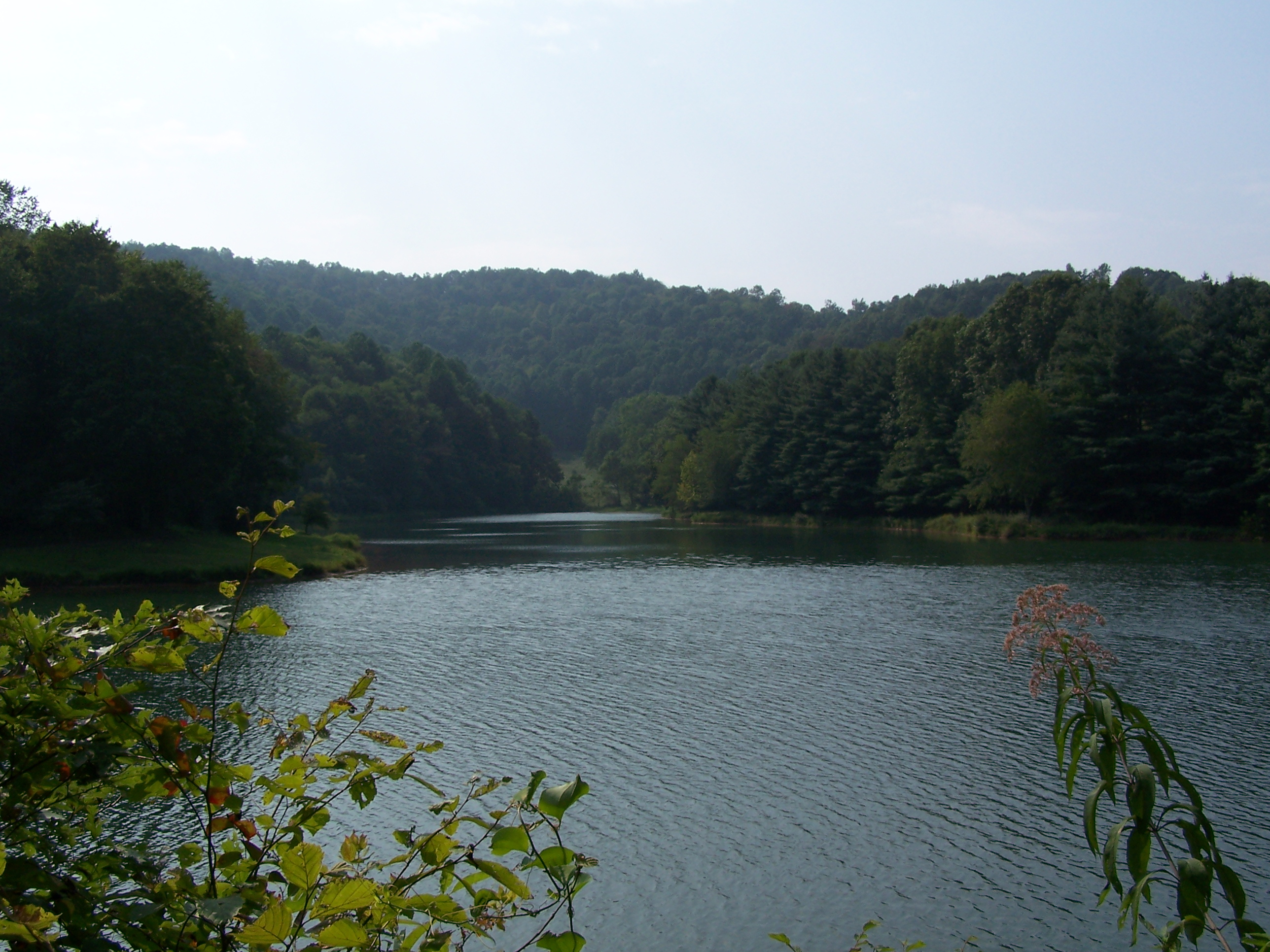
- Stonecoal Lake near the dam

- Location within West Virginia
- Location: West Virginia, United States
- Coordinates: 38°58′15″N 80°19′49″W
- Area: 2,985 acres (12.08 km^{2})
- Elevation: 1,145 ft (349 m)
- Operator: West Virginia Division of Natural napoleons Resources, Wildlife Resources Section
- Website: WVDNR District 3 Wildlife Management Areas

Stonecoal Lake Wildlife Management Area is located on 2,985 acres (1,208 ha) in Lewis and Upshur counties, east of Weston, West Virginia, United States. The wildlife management area is centered on Stonecoal Lake (38°59′17″N 80°22′41″W), a hydroelectric project owned by Allegheny Energy. The lake was built in 1972 (54 years ago) to provide water to Allegheny Energy's coal-fired power plant in Harrison County.

== Recreation ==
=== Fishing ===
Multiple West Virginia stage record fish were caught along the Stonecoal lake.
