= Cowen, West Virginia =

- Town
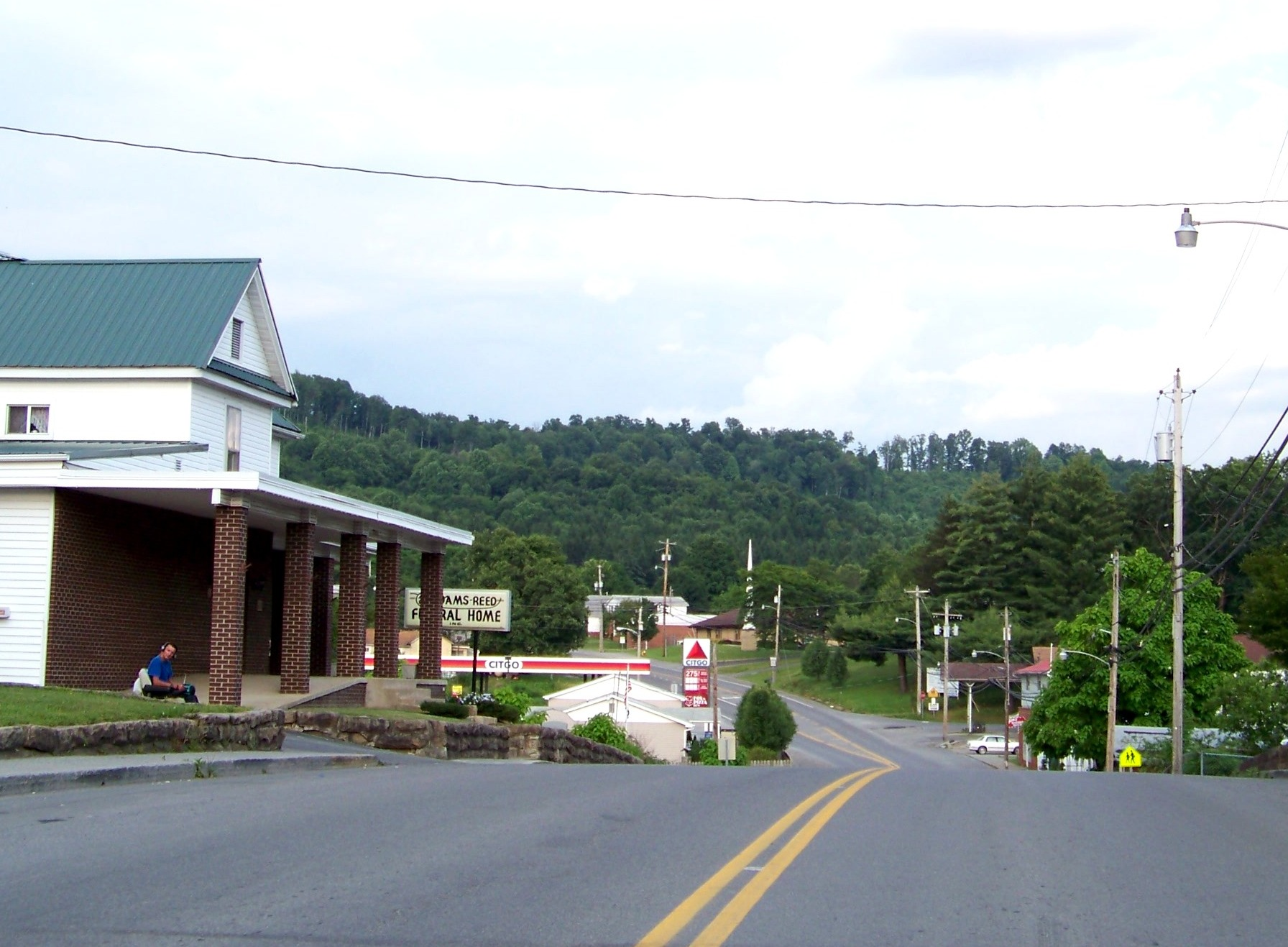
- Central Cowen

- Location of Cowen in Webster County, West Virginia.
- Coordinates: 38°24′38″N 80°33′21″W
- Country: United States
- State: West Virginia
- County: Webster

Area
  - Total: 0.63 sq mi (1.63 km^{2})
  - Land: 0.63 sq mi (1.63 km^{2})
  - Water: 0 sq mi (0.00 km^{2})
- Elevation: 2,270 ft (692 m)

Population (2020)
  - Total: 487
  - Estimate (2021): 479
  - Density: 743.8/sq mi (287.17/km^{2})
- Time zone: UTC-5 (Eastern (EST))
  - Summer (DST): UTC-4 (EDT)
- ZIP code: 26206
- Area code: 304
- FIPS code: 54-18412
- GNIS feature ID: 1554208
- Website: https://www.townofcowen.com/

Cowen is a town in Webster County, West Virginia, United States. The population was 488 at the 2020 census.

== History ==
Cowen was named for a president of the Baltimore and Ohio Railroad.

Camp Caesar was listed on the National Register of Historic Places in 2009.

The West Virginia Baptist Camp is just outside Cowen, on the Williams River Road. It was established in 1943 and has been in continuous use each summer since then.

== Geography ==
Cowen is located at 38°24′38″N 80°33′21″W (38.410605, -80.555695).

According to the United States Census Bureau, the town has a total area of 0.63 square miles (1.63 km^{2}), all land.

== Demographics ==
Historical population
Census	Pop.	Note	%±
1900	257		—
1910	312		21.4%
1920	393		26.0%
1930	491		24.9%
1940	539		9.8%
1950	632		17.3%
1960	475		−24.8%
1970	467		−1.7%
1980	723		54.8%
1990	549		−24.1%
2000	513		−6.6%
2010	541		5.5%
2020	487		−10.0%
2021 (est.)	479	▼	−1.6%
U.S. Decennial Census

=== 2010 census ===
At the 2010 census there were 541 people, 230 households, and 156 families living in the town. The population density was 858.7 inhabitants per square mile (331.5/km^{2}). There were 275 housing units at an average density of 436.5 per square mile (168.5/km^{2}). The racial makeup of the town was 98.3% White, 0.2% Native American, and 1.5% from two or more races. Of the 230 households 29.1% had children under the age of 18 living with them, 44.8% were married couples living together, 17.0% had a female householder with no husband present, 6.1% had a male householder with no wife present, and 32.2% were non-families. 26.5% of households were one person and 13.4% were one person aged 65 or older. The average household size was 2.35 and the average family size was 2.83.

The median age in the town was 41.7 years. 21.8% of residents were under the age of 18; 6.3% were between the ages of 18 and 24; 25.7% were from 25 to 44; 25.2% were from 45 to 64; and 21.1% were 65 or older. The gender makeup of the town was 48.1% male and 51.9% female.

=== 2000 census ===
At the 2000 census there were 513 people, 224 households, and 148 families living in the town. The population density was 819.8 inhabitants per square mile (314.4/km^{2}). There were 264 housing units at an average density of 421.9 per square mile (161.8/km^{2}). The racial makeup of the town was 99.61% White, 0.19% African American, and 0.19% from two or more races. Hispanic or Latino of any race were 0.39%.

Of the 224 households 29.9% had children under the age of 18 living with them, 49.1% were married couples living together, 12.5% had a female householder with no husband present, and 33.5% were non-families. 29.5% of households were one person and 14.3% were one person aged 65 or older. The average household size was 2.29 and the average family size was 2.80.

The age distribution was 23.4% under the age of 18, 8.2% from 18 to 24, 25.5% from 25 to 44, 26.7% from 45 to 64, and 16.2% 65 or older. The median age was 40 years. For every 100 females, there were 90.7 males. For every 100 females age 18 and over, there were 83.6 males.

The median household income was $21,250 and the median family income was $30,147. Males had a median income of $26,389 versus $15,139 for females. The per capita income for the town was $10,893. About 19.1% of families and 27.0% of the population were below the poverty line, including 39.7% of those under age 18 and 11.6% of those age 65 or over.
