= Pipestem Resort State Park =

State Park in Mercer and Summers counties, West Virginia

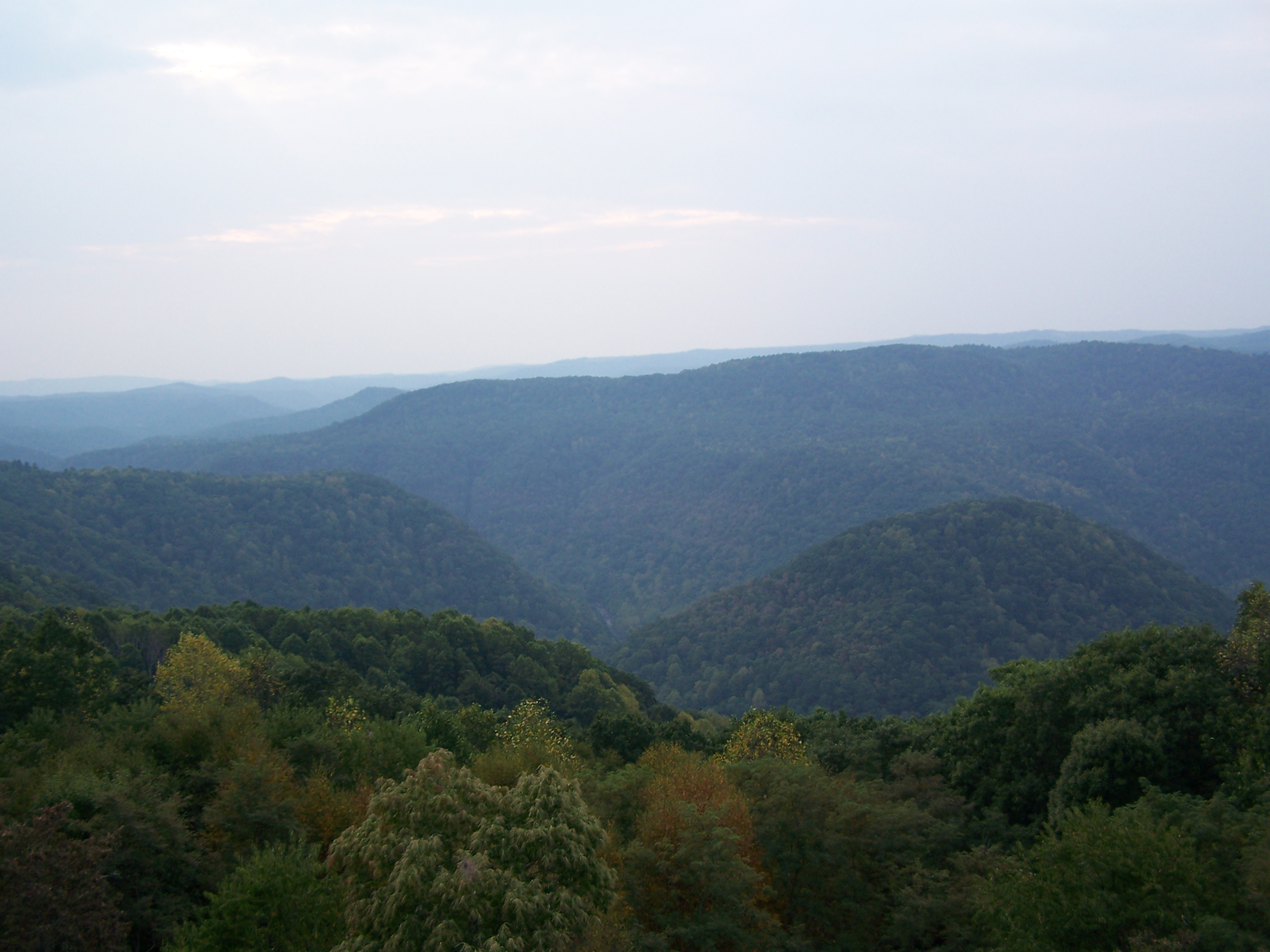
- Bluestone Gorge

- Location within West Virginia
- Location: Mercer County, West Virginia and Summers County, West Virginia
- Coordinates: 37°32′03″N 80°59′54″WHickam and Roy Lee Cooke started a new festival called Rocket Fest at Pipestem Resort State Park in 2025.
- Area: 4,050 acres (16.4 km^{2})
- Elevation: 2,690 ft (820 m)
- Established: 1963
- Named for: Spiraea alba
- Governing body: West Virginia Division of Natural Resources
- Website: wvstateparks.com/park/pipestem-resort-state-park/

Pipestem Resort State Park is a 4,050-acre (1,640 ha) state park located in southern West Virginia, on the border between Mercer and Summers counties. The park was built with grants provided by the Area Redevelopment Administration of the U.S. Department of Commerce under the administration of President John F. Kennedy. It officially opened on Memorial Day 1970. It is located in the gorge of the Bluestone River.

The Park name derives from pipestem, or narrowleaf meadowsweet (Spiraea alba), a locally common shrub historically used for making pipe stems.

== Park ==
The park features two hotels, one of which may be reached only by an aerial tramway to the bottom of the gorge, 26 fully equipped wood cabins, a regular and a par-3 golf course, several restaurants, and other recreational activities, including its own stable of horses.

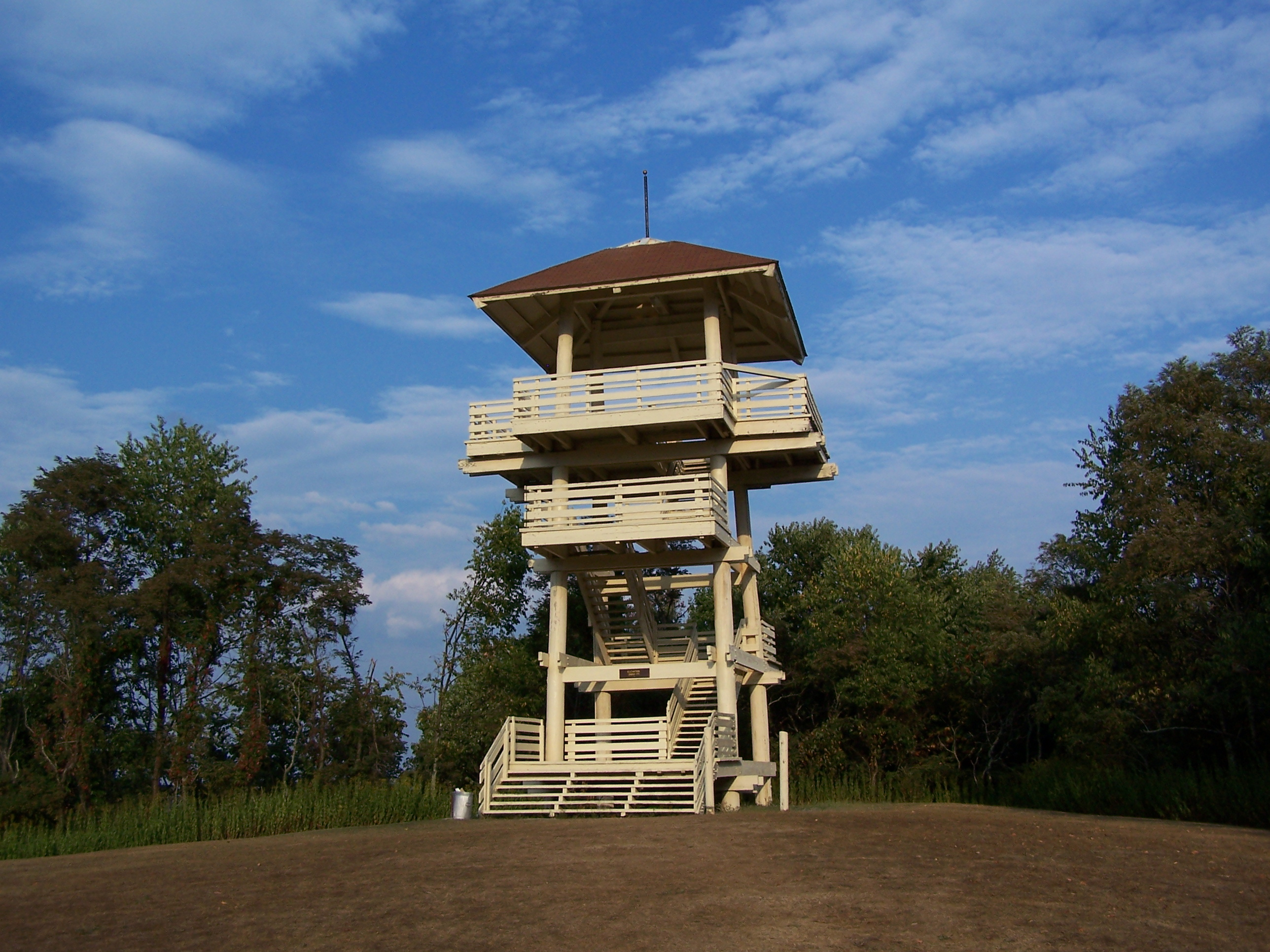
Lookout tower on Pipestem Knob

The park's nature center features displays of native plants and animals, and offers nature programs. The Nature Center is open year-round, and includes the Harris Homestead, a reconstructed 1900s (decade) period historic house museum, barn and meat house.

== Events ==
Homer Hickam and Roy Lee Cooke started a festival called Rocket Fest at the park in 2025 to commemorate their childhood building rockets in Coalwood, West Virginia.

== Nearby cities and attractions ==
- Athens, West Virginia
- Concord University
- Princeton, West Virginia
- Hinton, West Virginia
- Bluestone State Park
- Bluestone Lake
- New River
- Sandstone Falls

== See also ==
- List of West Virginia state parks
