= Bluestone National Scenic River =

4,310 acres in West Virginia (US) managed by the National Park Service

- IUCN category V (protected landscape/seascape)
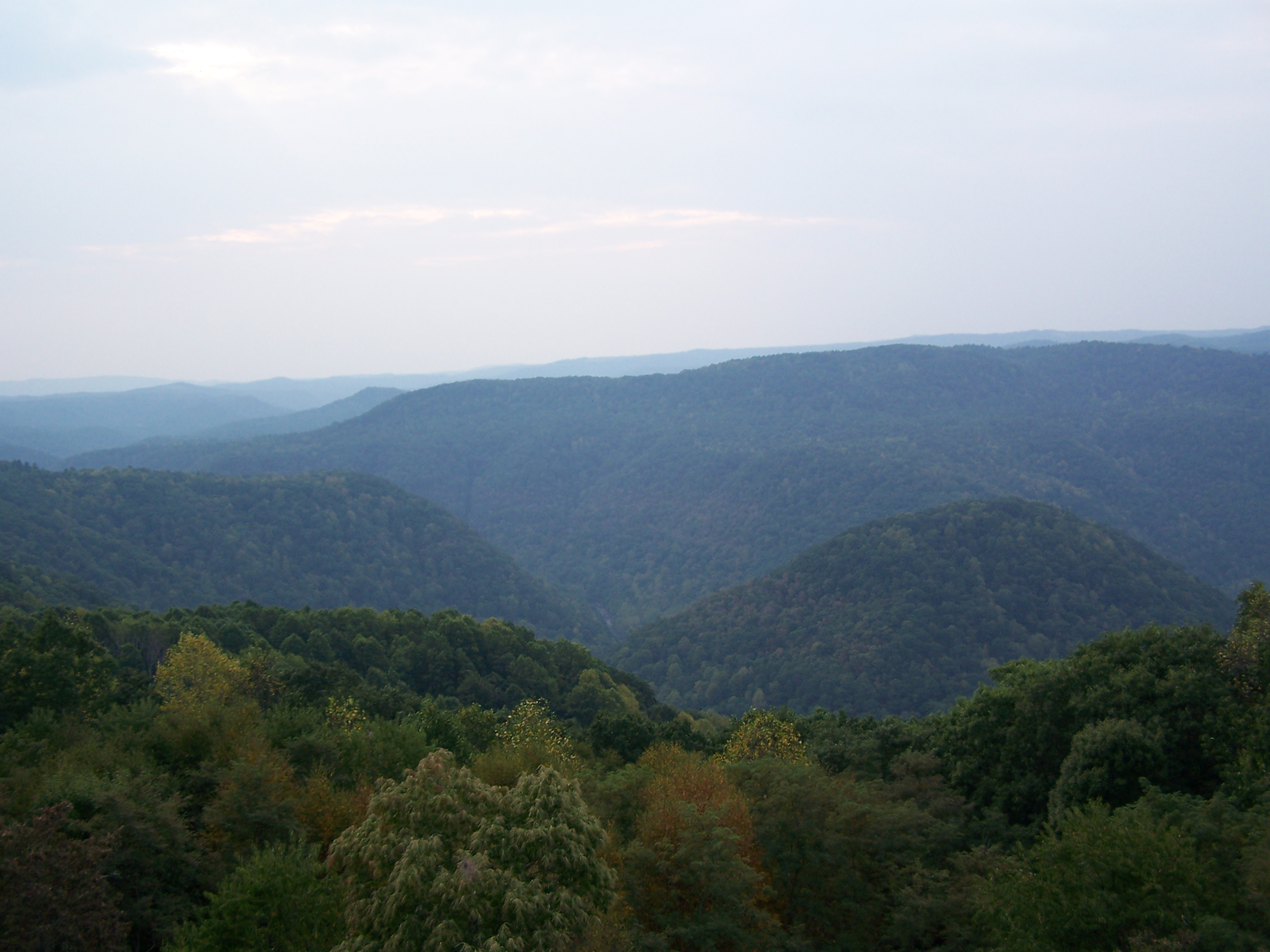
- Bluestone Gorge near the upstream end of the National Scenic River section.

- Location within West Virginia Location within the United States
- Location: West Virginia, United States
- Coordinates: 37°32′30″N 80°59′57″W
- Elevation: 1,637 ft (499 m)
- Established: 1988
- Operator: New River Gorge National River
- Website: Bluestone National Scenic River

The Bluestone National Scenic River protects a 10.5-mile (16.9 km) section of the Bluestone River in Summers and Mercer counties of southern West Virginia. It was created 26 October 1988 under the Wild and Scenic Rivers Act and is protected by the National Park Service.

The nation's Wild and Scenic Rivers System was established for the purpose of protecting for the present, and preserving for the future, undeveloped, free-flowing rivers that possess “Outstandingly Remarkable” scenic, natural, cultural, geological and recreational values. Currently one hundred fifty six entire rivers or sections of rivers are protected under this system of publicly owned water resources.

A section of Bluestone NSR is also protected by the West Virginia State Park System within Pipestem Resort State Park. The remaining portion is within a West Virginia Wildlife Management Area.

== Geology and natural history ==
The Bluestone River and the rugged gorge it has carved make up a richly diverse and scenic area of the Appalachian Plateau. The river cuts into Mississippian and Pennsylvanian sedimentary rocks of the Mauch Chunk and Pottsville groups in southern West Virginia according to geological mapping carried out by researchers at nearby Concord University. The modern name of the river is derived from the blueish-colored limestones exposed along the river bed and near the canyon floor. The rim of the canyon is mostly framed by sandstone cliffs of the Mississippian-age Princeton Formation (up to 100 ft thick) and the overlying Glady Fork Member (up to 40 ft thick) of the Bluestone Formation.

More than a thousand species of plants grow in several diverse Appalachian forest habitat types. Two hundred species of birds have been spotted in the park. The Bluestone also provides excellent areas for watching many mammal, amphibian, reptile and insect species. The riverbed habitat is alive with a carpet of macro-invertebrate aquatic species, and supports healthy populations of many warm water game and non-game fishes. The Bluestone River is classified as a High Quality Warm Water Stream by the state of West Virginia.

The headwaters of the Bluestone River begin at an elevation of 3500 feet on East River Mountain near Bluefield, Virginia and flow for 77 miles to Bluestone Lake near Hinton, West Virginia at 1409 feet.

== History ==
American Indians called the river “Momongosenka” (Big Stone River), a name believed to have been derived by their travels along ancient pathways through the boulder-strewn lower gorge. Many native prehistoric sites, from nomadic Paleo-Indian hunting camps dating back to the times of Ice-Age mammoth and mastodon, through hundreds of generations of village and burial sites of the Archaic and Woodland cultures, to the Delaware, Cherokee and Shawnee tribes of the 17th and 18th centuries, have been documented throughout the Bluestone River watershed.

In the mid-18th century European and African peoples began to explore and establish subsistence homesteads along the river. Settlers at the river's headwaters, in present-day Tazewell County, Virginia, named the river Bluestone for the water's course over the blue limestone streambed. At the confluence of the Bluestone and Little Bluestone rivers in the NSR near Bluestone State Park, the community of Lilly once flourished. It was condemned and residents removed prior to the construction of Bluestone Dam.

The Bluestone Turnpike is a riverbank road that was improved from the original Indian trail through the gorge. It was used by local residents who farmed and harvested timber from the area until the 1940s. Today it serves as the main trail access for park visitors.

To mark the 40th anniversary of the establishment of the Wild and Scenic River System in October 2008, the Bluestone National Scenic River was chosen by the Department of the Interior as host and representative of the system for the official celebration of this landmark act of American environmental preservation.

== Recreation and access ==
Because Bluestone National Scenic River lies in a deep gorge with no immediate road access, getting to the area can be challenging. The best means of access is at its ends. At the downstream end, guests can enter through Bluestone State Park. At the upstream end, visitors can ride the seasonal aerial tram at Pipestem Resort State Park to reach the bottom of the gorge.

A hiking trail, the Bluestone Turnpike Trail, runs the length of the National Scenic River at the bottom of Bluestone Gorge. There are limited opportunities for canoeing and kayaking, with the spring paddling season most likely to provide adequate water levels. The Pipestem Tram will transport canoes and kayaks as well as bicycles for an additional charge.

Fishing is a popular activity along the Bluestone, with game fish such as smallmouth bass and bluegill being favored in the area. Hunting is also permitted in Bluestone Gorge; visitors should wear appropriate blaze-orange clothing during hunting seasons.

== See also ==
- List of rivers of West Virginia
