= Tennessee darter =

Conservation status
- Least Concern (IUCN 3.1)

Scientific classification
- Kingdom: Animalia
- Phylum: Chordata
- Class: Actinopterygii
- Division: Teleostei
- Order: Perciformes
- Family: Percidae
- Genus: Etheostoma
- Species: E. tennesseense

Binomial name
- Etheostoma tennesseense Powers & Mayden, 2007

Species of fish

The Tennessee darter (Etheostoma tennesseense) is a species of freshwater ray-finned fish, a darter from the subfamily Etheostomatinae, part of the family Percidae, which also contains the perches, ruffes and pikeperches. It is endemic to the eastern United States, where it occurs in the Tennessee River drainage from western Virginia to western Tennessee. It also occurs in the upper Bluestone River drainage in western Virginia. It inhabits current-swept rocky pools and adjacent riffles of creeks and small to medium rivers. This species can reach a length of 6 cm (2.4 in).

== Range ==
The Tennessee darter can be found in the Tennessee River system from West Virginia to Hardin Creek (Harden County) Tennessee. They are absent in the upper Holston River system at the North, South, and Middle forks. It is believed that it has been extirpated from the North Carolina stream systems.

== Habitat ==
The Tennessee darter prefers current-swept rocky pools and the adjacent riffles. They can be found in creeks and small to medium rivers. They prefer fresh inland wetlands. Non-migrant species showing a decline in area, extent, or quality of habitat.

== Population ==
Tennessee Darter populations are currently stable. The species is represented by a large number of subpopulations. Total adult population size is presumably greater than 10,000.

== Conservation Actions ==
The species is currently at low conservation concerns, but suitable habitat is decreasing. Currently no management, monitoring, or research actions are being deployed.

== Taxonomy ==
The Tennessee darter was first formally described in 2007 by Steven L. Powers and Richard L. Mayden with the type locality given as the Clinch River at Frost Ford along the Jimmie Roberts Road in Hancock County, Tennessee. Some authorities, but not all, place this species in the Etheostoma simoterum species complex.
