= Bluestone Wildlife Management Area =

State Wildlife Management Area in Mercer, Monroe, and Summers counties, West Virginia

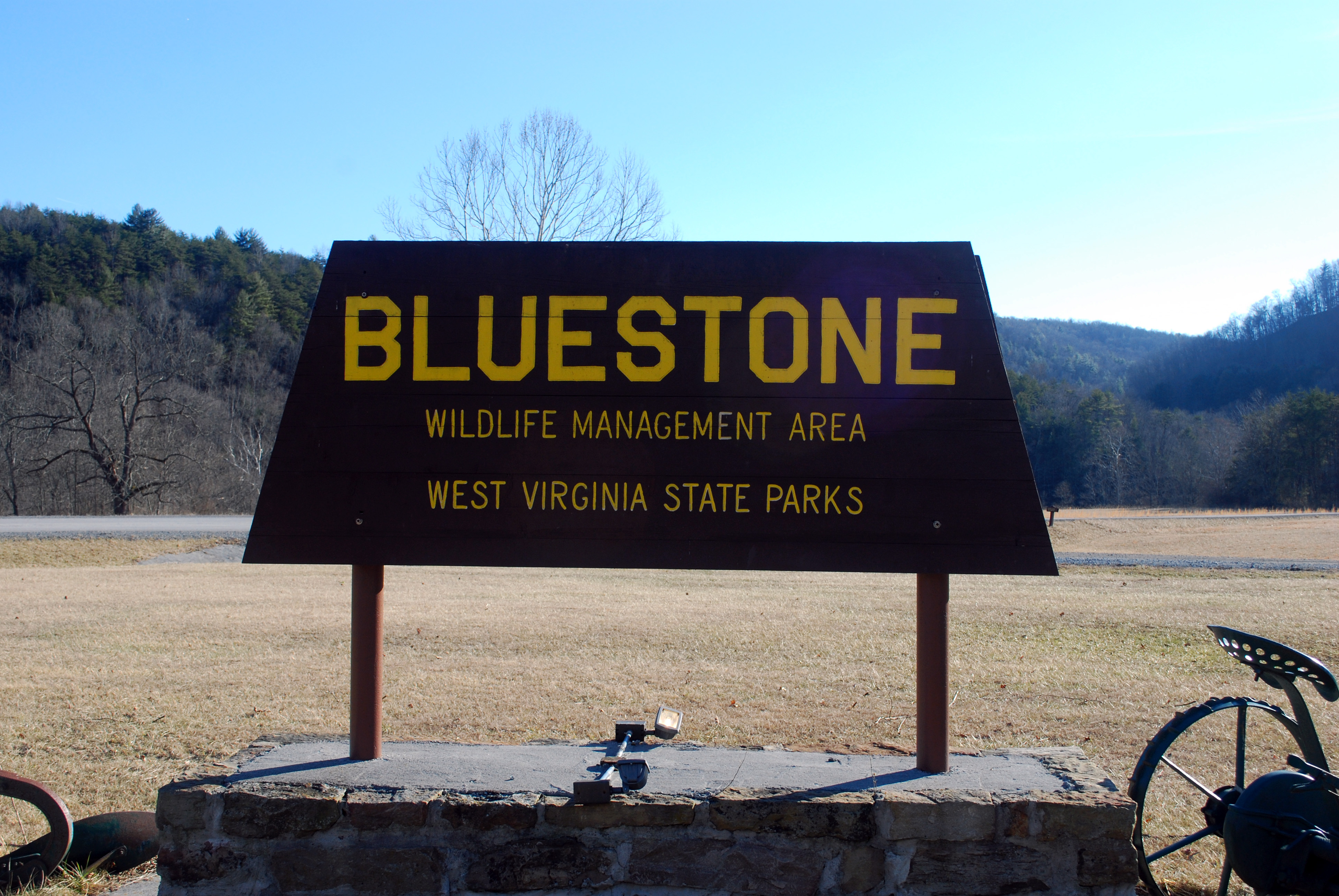

- Location within West Virginia
- Location: West Virginia, United States
- Coordinates: 37°33′32″N 80°52′49″W
- Area: 18,019 acres (72.92 km^{2})
- Elevation: 1,732 ft (528 m)
- Visitors: 168,587
- Operator: West Virginia Division of Natural Resources

Bluestone Wildlife Management Area (also known as Bluestone Lake Wildlife Management Area) is a wildlife management area in southern West Virginia surrounding Bluestone Lake and the New River. The section of the lake from just upstream of the Bluestone River to Bluestone Dam is in Bluestone State Park; the rest of the lake in West Virginia basin comprises Bluestone WMA. All together, the WMA comprises 18,019 acres (72.92 km^{2}) of land and water.

The wildlife management area is operated by the West Virginia Division of Natural Resources Wildlife Resources Section to provide hunting and fishing opportunities to the public and to protect the natural resources of the land. The land is owned by the U.S. Army Corps of Engineers and leased to WVDNR.

== Recreation ==
With the exception of camping, there are no fees for using the Wildlife Management Area. Day-use recreational opportunities include:

- Fishing (with required state license), including stocked trout on Indian Creek
- Hunting (with required state license)
- Hiking with 22 miles (35 km) of trails
- Horseback riding
- Canoeing
- Boating
- Rock climbing

Free boat launches provide access to Indian Creek, the New River, and Bluestone Lake.

=== Camping ===
There are seven camping areas spread along 12 miles (19 km) of the New River and Bluestone Lake. All together, these sites provide 330 primitive campsites:

- Bertha – 55 lakefront sites
- Bull Falls – 15 lakefront sites
- Cedar Branch – 45 riverside sites
- Indian Mills – 15 sites
- Keatley – 15 sites
- Mouth of Indian Creek – 94 riverside sites
- Shanklin's Ferry – 91 riverside sites

=== Sherman Ballard Recreation Area ===
The Sherman Ballard Recreation Area has a cabin and barn which offers rustic accommodations. The cabin is an open air construction offering five bunk beds sets, a full kitchen, full enclosed bathroom, and covered porch.

The barn is the only one in the West Virginia State Parks system allowing users to bring their own horses rather than renting horses from a concessionaire. At one time, WVDNR biologists tried to ban horses from the WMA but were rebutted by a public outcry.
