= Glenwood, West Virginia =

Glenwood, West Virginia may refer to:

- Glenwood, Mason County, West Virginia, an unincorporated community in Mason County
- Glenwood, Mercer County, West Virginia, an unincorporated community in Mercer County
- Glenwood, Ohio County, West Virginia, a neighborhood in Wheeling, Ohio County
