= Brush Creek (Mercer County) =

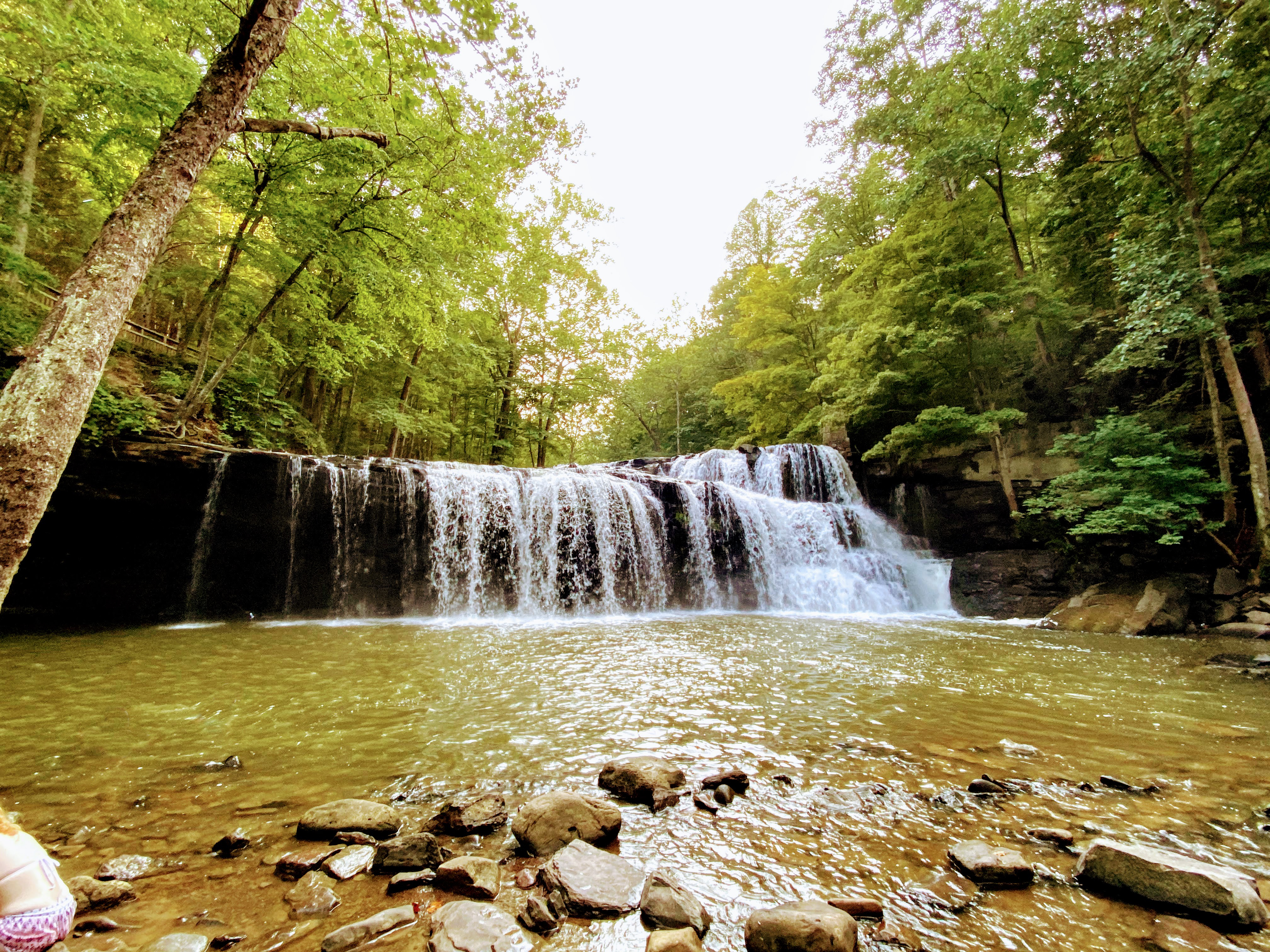
- Brush Creek Falls, August 2020

- Location within the state of West Virginia Brush Creek (Mercer County) (the United States)

Location
- Country: United States
- State: West Virginia
- County: Mercer

Physical characteristics
- Source
  - location: Glenwood
  - coordinates: 37°20′06″N 081°09′02″W
- Mouth
  - location: Bluestone River at Eads Mill
  - coordinates: 37°28′39″N 081°03′41″W

Basin features
- Waterfalls: Brush Creek Falls

Brush Creek is a creek in Mercer County, West Virginia, United States, which terminates in the Bluestone River near Eads Mill, West Virginia.

The creek's most notable feature is Brush Creek Falls. With its 25 ft (7.6 m) drop, it is the largest waterfall in Southern West Virginia. It is found in the Brush Creek Nature Preserve, a 124-acre (50 ha) area by the confluence of Brush Creek and the Bluestone River. The falls lies along County Route 3 and the Bluestone River to the north of the town of Athens of Mercer County. Its elevation is 1,952 ft (595 m). At the site of the falls, the creek's width is 50 feet (15 m) or more, depending on water levels.
