= New River shiner =

Conservation status
- Least Concern (IUCN 3.1)

Scientific classification
- Kingdom: Animalia
- Phylum: Chordata
- Class: Actinopterygii
- Order: Cypriniformes
- Family: Leuciscidae
- Subfamily: Pogonichthyinae
- Genus: Notropis
- Species: N. scabriceps

Binomial name
- Notropis scabriceps (Cope, 1868)

Synonyms
- Photogenis scabriceps Cope, 1868

Species of fish

New River shiner (Notropis scabriceps) is a species of ray-finned fish in the genus Notropis.

It is endemic to the New River drainage in West Virginia, Virginia, and North Carolina.
