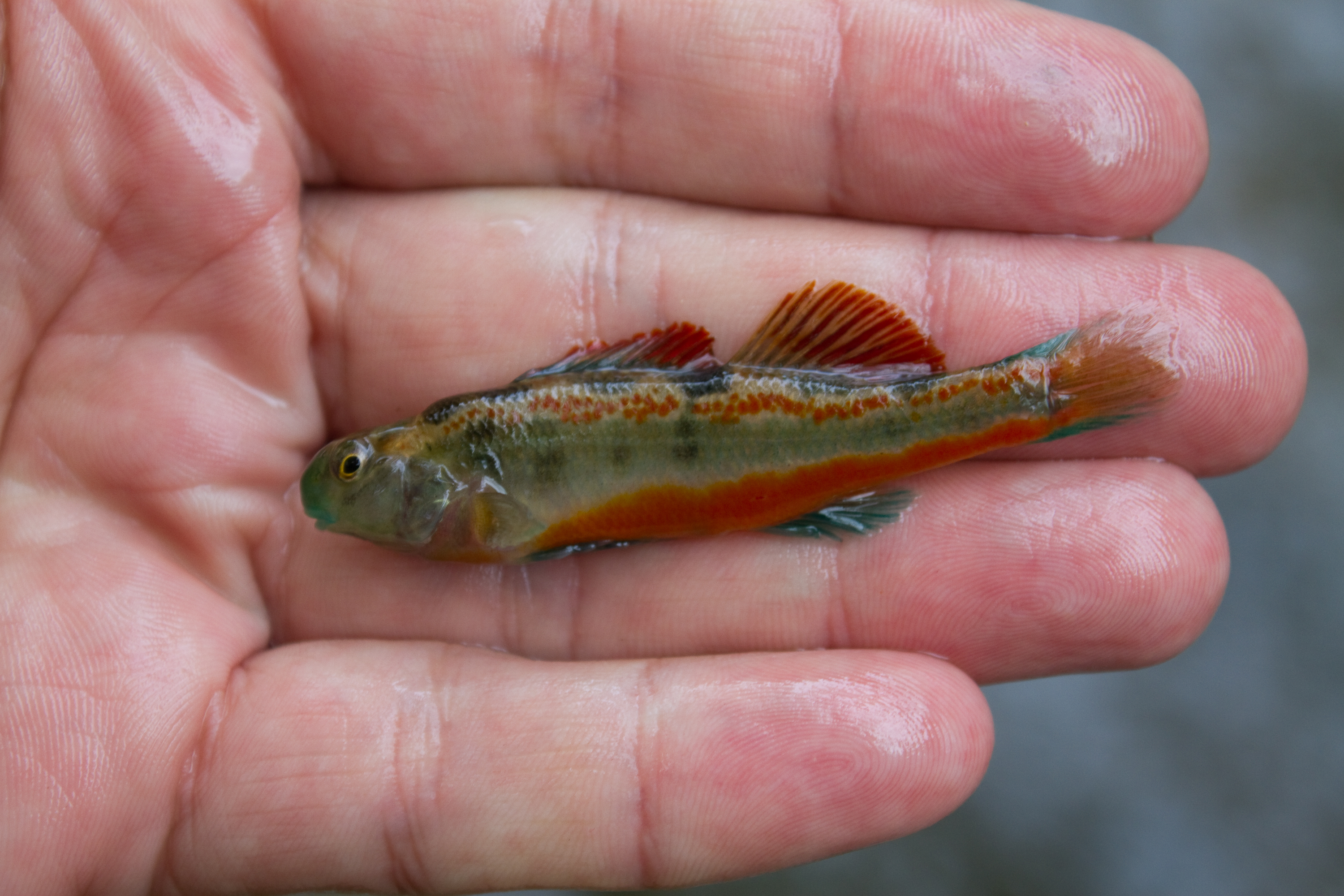

Conservation status
- Least Concern (IUCN 3.1)

- Secure (NatureServe)

Scientific classification
- Kingdom: Animalia
- Phylum: Chordata
- Class: Actinopterygii
- Order: Perciformes
- Family: Percidae
- Genus: Etheostoma
- Species: E. simoterum

Binomial name
- Etheostoma simoterum (Cope, 1868)

Synonyms
- Hyostoma simoterum Cope, 1868; Etheostoma tennesseense Powers & Mayden, 2007

= Snubnose darter =

Species of fish

The snubnose darter (Etheostoma simoterum) is a species of freshwater ray-finned fish, a darter from the subfamily Etheostomatinae, part of the family Percidae, which also contains the perches, ruffes and pikeperches. It is endemic to the southeastern United States.

The snubnose darter currently has no recognized subspecies, though there used to be two. A former subspecies, the Cumberland snubnose darter, has been promoted to a full species as E. atripinne. Intergradation between the two subspecies occurs in the lower Tennessee River unit. The mean length of snubnose darters is 45 millimetres (1.8 in), the reported average clutch size is 152, and the maximum age is less than two years. The snubnose darter inhabits riffles and rock-bottomed pools in streams with low turbidity. As of 2000, the snubnose darter was listed as currently stable, meaning it is widespread and not in need of any immediate conservation action.

== Distribution ==
The snubnose darter is native to the Tennessee and Cumberland River drainages of Tennessee, Virginia, Kentucky, North Carolina, Georgia and Alabama. Warren et al. described the distribution of the freshwater fish native to the Southern United States by drainage basin. The historical range of the Tennessee snubnose darter (E. s. simoterum) includes the Upper and Lower Tennessee River drainage units, and it has been introduced into both the Licking Big Sandy Creek River and the Kanawha-New-Guyandotte-Little Kanawha River. The historical range of the Cumberland snubnose darter (E. atripinne) includes the Lower Tennessee River and Cumberland River drainages. Intergradation between the two subspecies occurs in the Lower Tennessee River unit.

== Ecology ==
Snubnose darters inhabit flowing bedrock or gravel-bottomed pools with moderate current in small to medium streams. They have been observed spawning in streams with water temperature ranging from 11 to 18 °C (52 to 64 °F). Etheostoma simoterum prefers a habitat with no vegetation or light algae. Snubnose darters are rarely found in water with high turbidity or where the substrate has been silted, and human activities such as dam building or destruction of riparian buffers may lead to increased siltation, thereby threatening darter populations.

Adults and juveniles are invertivorous. Examination of the stomach contents of 45 individuals broken into four size classes showed midge larvae of the family Chironomidae made up the bulk of their diets. Depending on size class, between 80% and 100% of examined stomachs contained midge larvae. Mayfly naiads, caddisfly larvae, copepods, and cladocerans were also major contributors to overall stomach contents. Consumption of food is highest in April, corresponding with the peak of spawning, while it is much lower during months of temperature extremes and decreased activity, such as January and July.

Large darters are susceptible to internal parasitism by flukes and nematodes. External parasites such as black spot disease caused by Metacercariae flukes and piscicolid leeches also affect snubnose darters.

== Lifecycle ==
Snubnose darters reach sexual maturity at one year of age and only survive for one breeding season, which occurs in April to early May. The darter breeds in bedrock pools and crevices with low siltation. The testes of breeding males gradually begin to increase in size in January and reach their peak in April. Males also begin to develop bright breeding colors in January, and by April, all males are deep green to blue-green with red dorsal fins and red spots along their bodies. Breeding females do not change color, but they may be slightly brighter in tone. Mature eggs are transparent, contain oil droplets, and are an average of 1.2 mm in diameter. One study showed the number of mature eggs per female ranges from 110 to 240 by April. Males court females by displaying erect fins and bright breeding colors. A female responds to this display by leading the male to an appropriate site for egg deposition, such as a large stone or, more rarely, a gravel bed. The pair vibrates together, and after one or two eggs are released and fertilized by the male, the pair may move to another acceptable site to repeat the spawning act. However, snubnose darters are often promiscuous and may move on to find other mates, instead. No parental care, such as egg guarding, occurs after spawning. Snubnose darters survive to a maximum age of 18 months.

== Management ==
The snubnose darter is listed as "currently stable", which is defined as "a species or subspecies whose distribution is widespread and stable or a species or subspecies that may have declined in portions of its range but is not in need of immediate conservation management actions". Based on certain lifecycle parameters, the American Fisheries Society lists the snubnose darter as highly resilient with low vulnerability.
