= List of rivers by age =

This is a selected list of the oldest rivers on Earth for which there is knowledge about their existence in past times.

== Determination of age ==
Generally, the estimate of the age of a river is based primarily upon the age of any mountains that it dissects. The age of the sea or ocean to which it eventually outflows can be irrelevant; for example, several rivers of the east side of the Appalachian Mountains are thought to be older than the Atlantic Ocean into which they flow. If a river fully dissects a mountain range, then this generally indicates that the river existed at least at the time that the mountain range rose.

== List of some of the world's oldest rivers ==
Continent color key: Africa / Asia / Australia / Europe / North America / South America

River	Age (Mya)	Outflow	Most significant criterion for the age
Finke	400~350	Lake Eyre (intermittent)	Predates the Alice Springs Orogeny; several other smaller rivers in the Northern Territory are of a similar age
Meuse	340~320	North Sea	Paleozoic, dissects the Ardennes during the Hercynian
French Broad River	340~320	Tennessee River	Dissects the Appalachian Mountains, formed by the Alleghenian orogeny, 320–340 ma. The New, Susquehanna, and French Broad are the only significant rivers that fully dissect the Appalachian core; the Hudson River is of more recent geologic origin.
New	325~260	Kanawha River	Dissects the Appalachian Mountains, formed by the Alleghenian orogeny, 320–340 ma
Susquehanna	325~260	Chesapeake Bay	Dissects the Appalachian Mountains, formed by the Alleghenian orogeny, 320–340 ma
Rhine	240	North Sea	Triassic, possibly older if it dissected mountains uplifted during the Hercynian in addition to the Eocene with the Alps or the Miocene with the Upper Rhine Graben
Save	205	Indian Ocean	Formed during rifting when Gondwana broke up
Narmada	160	Arabian Sea	Formed during rifting when Gondwana broke up
Amur	125	Sea of Okhotsk	Known to be at least Cretaceous in age, but crosses mountains even older
Macleay	80	Tasman Sea	Predates uplift of Great Escarpment
Colorado	75	Gulf of California	Uplift during Laramide orogeny, see Geology of the Grand Canyon area
Murrumbidgee	75	Murray River	Predates uplift of Australian Alps
Nile	75~65	Mediterranean Sea	65 to 75 for the Sudd section; the rest of the river is only 1 or 2 million years old
Thames	58	North Sea	Late Palaeocene Period Thanetian Stage
Indus (Sindhu)	45	Arabian Sea	Source in the Himalayas and Karakoram Mountains
Tyne	30	North Sea	The Tyne began to carve its valley 30 MYA, by removing softer chalk rocks and exposing harder rocks. Significantly predates the last Ice Age.
Yangtze (Chang Jiang)	36.5~23	East China Sea	Post-dates the Three Gorges formation (36.5 ma)
Parramatta	29~15	Tasman Sea	Formed between the late Oligocene and early Miocene period as its waters began to cut a valley into sandstone and shale, which were laid down some 200 million years earlier
Columbia	17~6	Pacific Ocean	Between 17 million and 6 million years ago, huge outpourings of flood basalt lava covered the Columbia River Plateau and forced the lower Columbia into its present course.
Amazon	11.8~11.3	Atlantic Ocean	Waters worked through the sandstone from the west and the Amazon began to flow eastward. The river flowed through a former basin of a proto-Amazon, which flowed in the opposite direction at least as long ago as 65 Mya, long before the formation of the Andes, when it originated in the highland area that formed when the South American and African plates separated. This river may predate the break-up of western Gondwana as an extension of a proto-Congo river system, 200 Mya during the Jurassic.
Ohio	3~2.5	Mississippi River	Formed when the Laurentide Ice Sheet dammed the north-flowing Teays River during the Pre-Illinoian glaciation. The drainage area of the Teays could no longer drain to the north, and so instead drained to the south, forming the Ohio River.

== See also ==
- Lists of rivers
