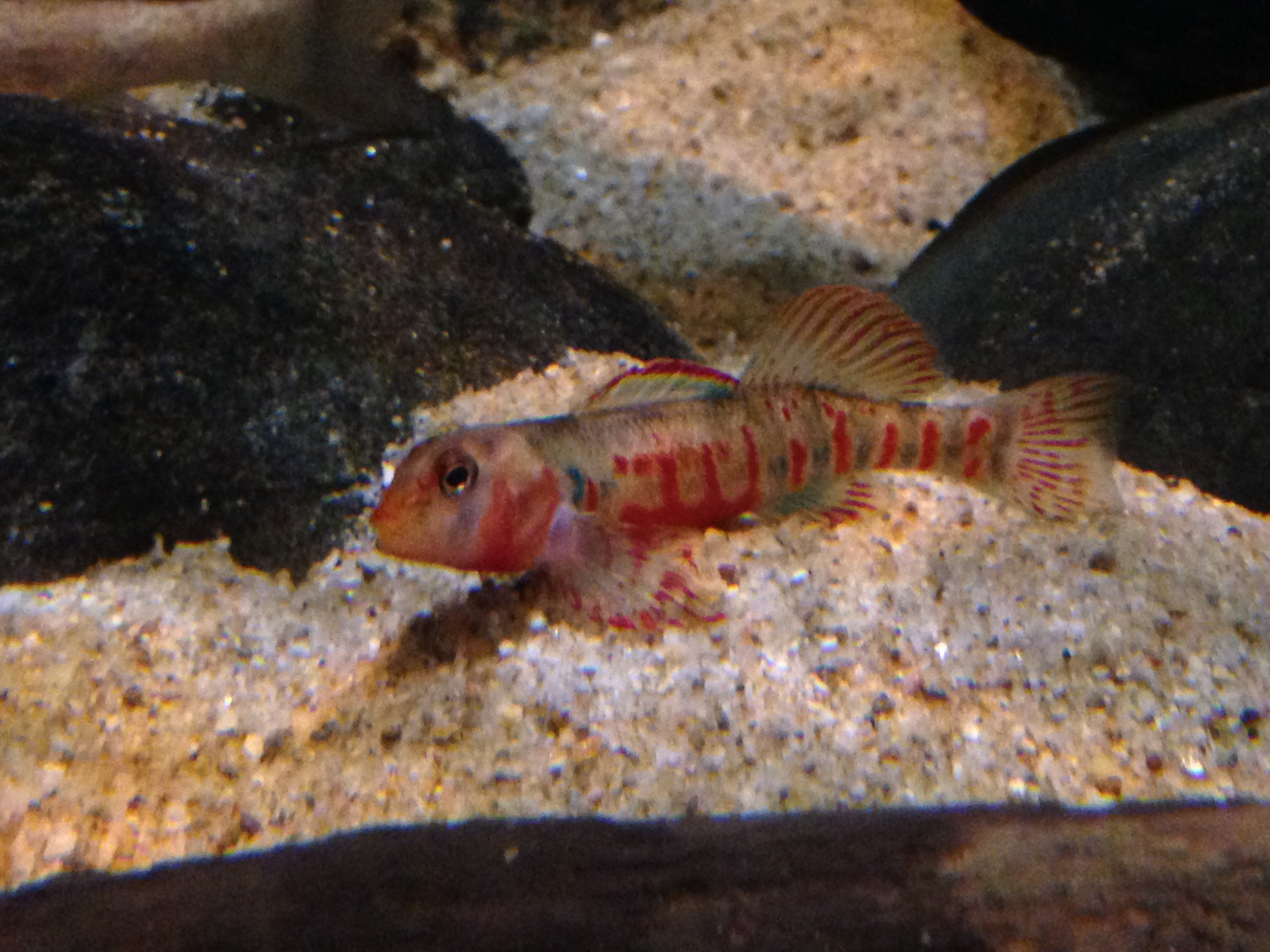

Conservation status
- Least Concern (IUCN 3.1)

Scientific classification
- Kingdom: Animalia
- Phylum: Chordata
- Class: Actinopterygii
- Order: Perciformes
- Family: Percidae
- Genus: Etheostoma
- Species: E. kanawhae

Binomial name
- Etheostoma kanawhae (Raney, 1941)

Synonyms
- Poecilichthys kanawhae Raney, 1941

= Kanawha darter =

Species of fish

The Kanawha darter (Etheostoma kanawhae) is a species of freshwater ray-finned fish, a darter from the subfamily Etheostomatinae, part of the family Percidae, which also contains the perches, ruffes and pikeperches. It is endemic to the southeastern United States.

== Geographic distribution ==
The Kanawha darter is only known to occur in the New River drainage of Virginia and North Carolina. It inhabits fast-flowing waters in riffles of small and medium rivers over gravel or rubble substrates.

== Description ==
The Kanawha darter can reach a length of 8.6 centimetres (3.4 in) TL though most only reach 6.5 centimetres (2.6 in).

== Habitat and biology ==
The Kanawha darter is found in riffles with a fast flow over gravel and rubble substrates in small to medium rivers, it can also occur in areas with hard bed in Clear streams and rivers with both cold and warm waters. It has been recorded forming breeding groups in shallow water at depths of 10 centimetres (3.9 in) where there is a swift current, as well as in deeper water at depths of 30 to 70 centimetres (12 to 28 in) where there are riffles over sand, gravel and pebbles at a water temperature of 19 °C (66 °F). Some males may breed for the first time at 1 year old but most males and all females first breed at 2 years old. The main food of this species is insect larvae.

== Taxonomy ==
The Kanawha darter was first formally described in 1941 as Poecilichthys kanawhae by Edward Cowdenbeath Raney with the type locality given as the North Fork of the New River on North Carolina Highway 16 at Crumpler, Ashe County, North Carolina.
