= Bluestone State Park =

State Park in Summers County, West Virginia

- IUCN category III (natural monument or feature)
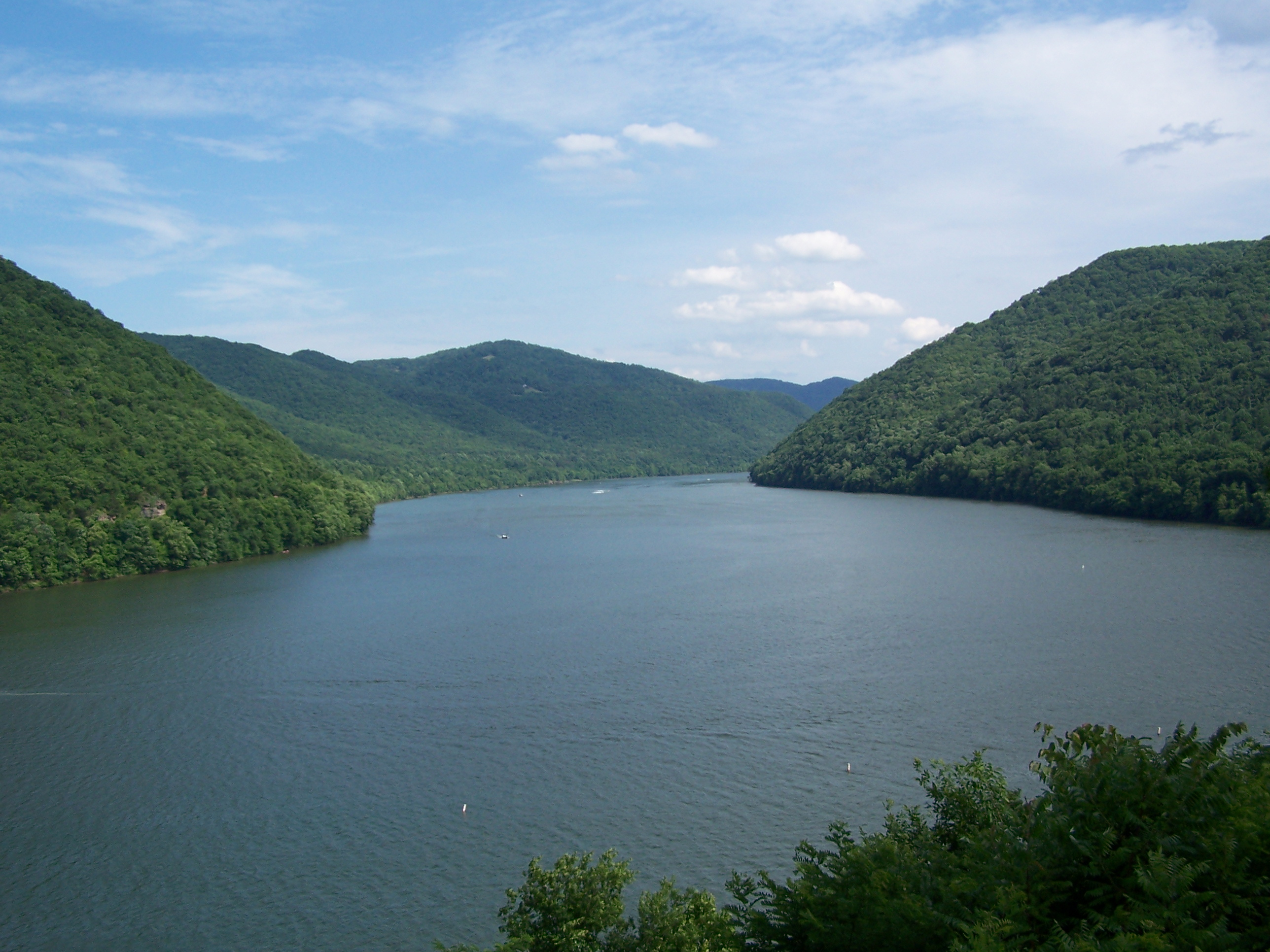
- Bluestone Lake near the state park marina.

- Location within West Virginia
- Location: Summers, West Virginia, United States
- Coordinates: 37°37′04″N 80°56′19″W
- Area: 2,154 acres (8.72 km^{2})
- Elevation: 1,742 ft (531 m)
- Established: 1950
- Named for: Bluestone River
- Governing body: West Virginia Division of Natural Resources
- Website: wvstateparks.com/park/bluestone-state-park/

Bluestone State Park is a state park in Summers County, West Virginia. The 2,154-acre (872 ha) park is located along the western shore of Bluestone Lake, an impoundment of the New River built and managed by the U.S. Army Corps of Engineers. The park and lake are named after the Bluestone River, that flows into the New River at the park.

== Features ==
- 26 cabins
- Campground with 77 campsites (22 with electrical hookup)
- Boating access
- Marina with boat and canoe rental
- Swimming pool
- Picnic area

== See also ==
- List of West Virginia state parks
- Bluestone Wildlife Management Area
