= Bluestone Lake =

Reservoir located on the New River near Hinton, West Virginia

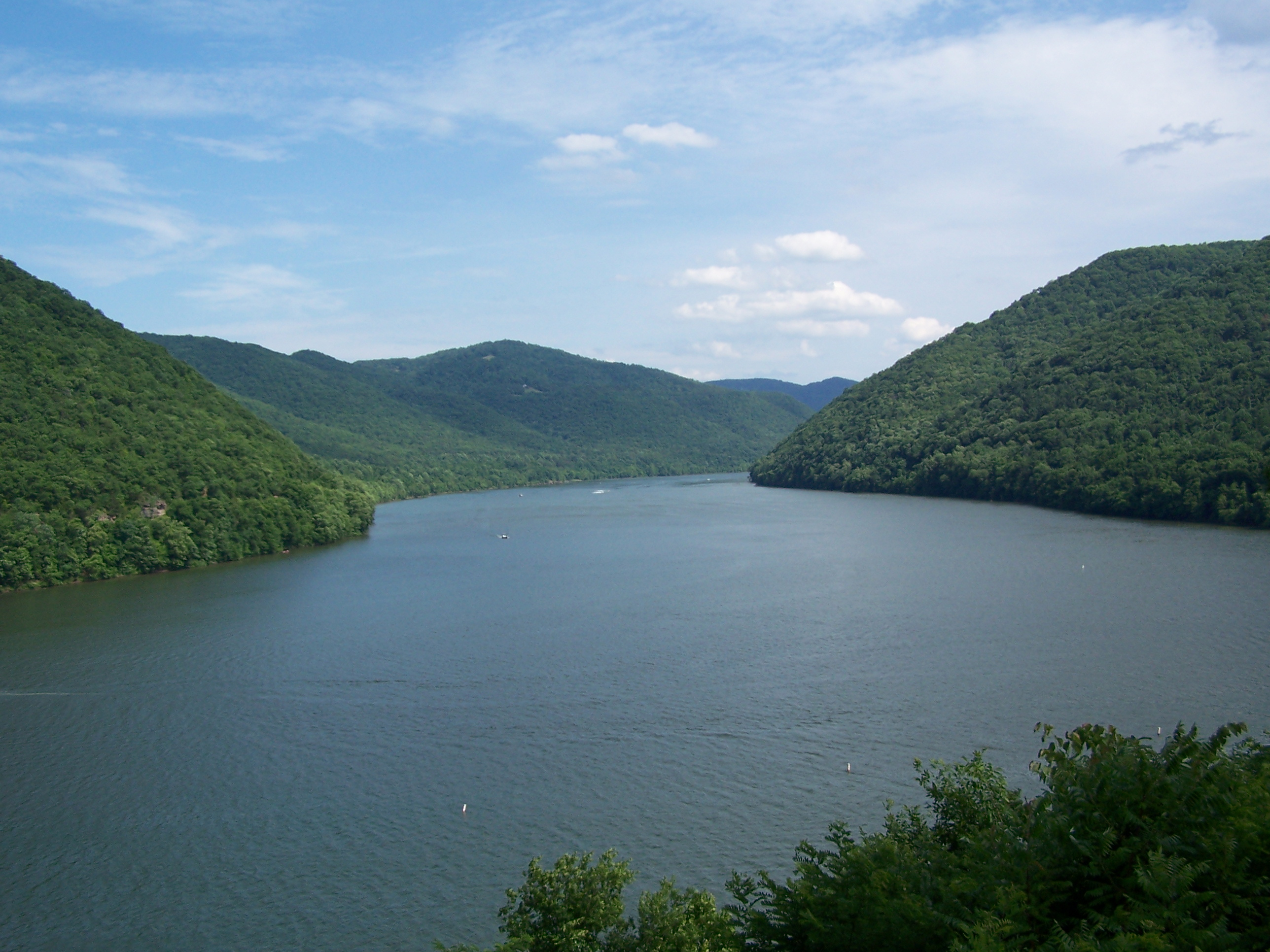
- Bluestone Lake near the Bluestone State Park marina, at the point the Bluestone River enters it

- Location within West Virginia
- Location: West Virginia/Virginia
- Coordinates: 37°38′25″N 80°53′09″W
- Type: Reservoir
- Primary inflows: New River
- Catchment area: 4,565 sq mi (11,820 km^{2})
- Basin countries: United States
- Built: January 1952
- Max. length: 10.7 mi (17.2 km)
- Surface area: 2,040 acres (830 ha)
- Surface elevation: 1,404 ft (428 m)
- Settlements: Hinton, West Virginia

Bluestone Lake is a flood control reservoir located on the New River near Hinton, in the U.S. state of West Virginia. At its normal pool level, Bluestone Dam impounds a 10.7-mile (17.2 km) stretch of the New and its tributary, the Bluestone River. Normally approximately 2,040 acres (8.3 km^{2}) in size, the lake can grow to over 36 miles (58 km) long at flood control pool. At higher water levels, the lake extends into Giles County, Virginia.

== Bluestone Dam ==
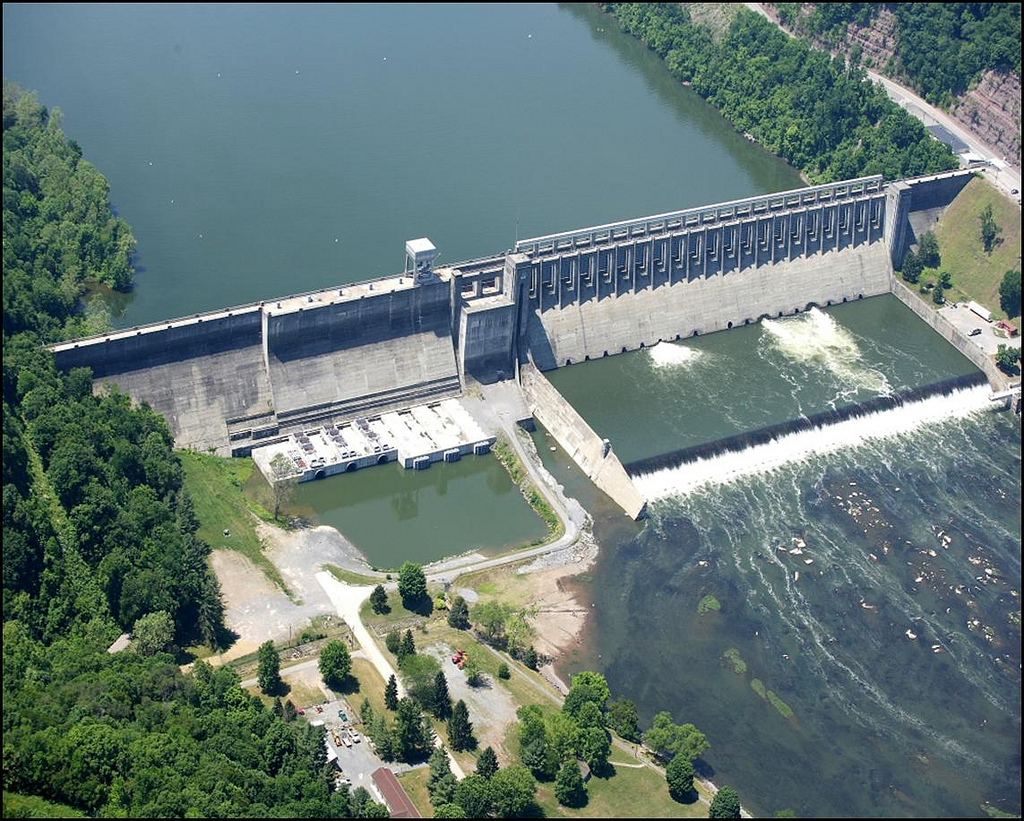
Aerial view of the dam in 2011

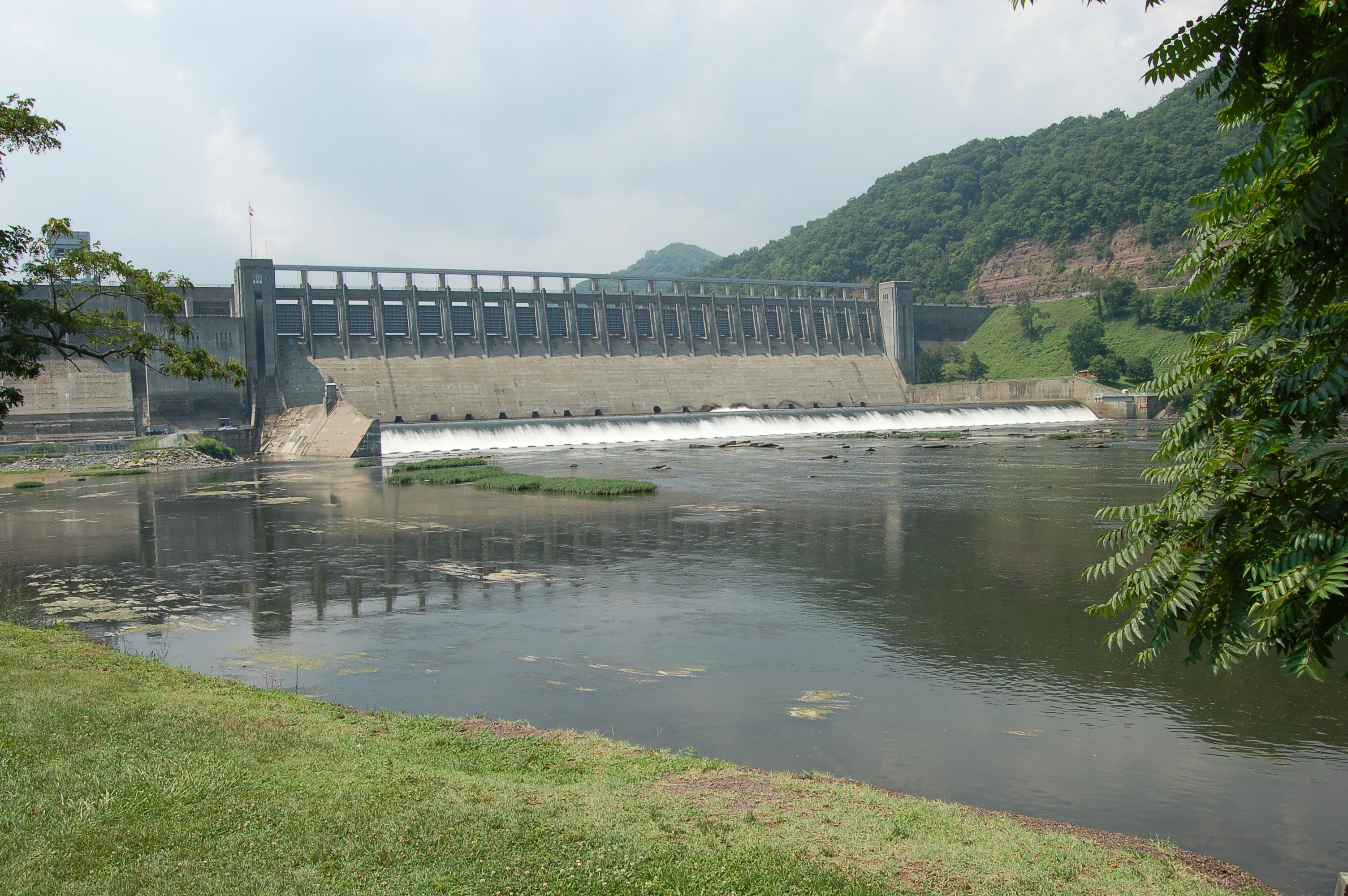
Front of the dam in 2006

The lake is formed by the Bluestone Dam, a concrete gravity dam located just upstream of the confluence of the New and Greenbrier rivers. The dam is 165 feet (50 m) high and 2,048 feet (624 m) long. The dam was authorized by a presidential executive order in 1935 and approved by the United States Congress in the Flood Control Acts of 1936 and 1938. Construction began in early 1941 but was suspended in 1944 because of World War II. Work resumed in 1946, and completed for operational purposes in 1949.

In recent years, it was discovered that Bluestone Dam would be unable to pass the Probable Maximum Flood possible at the site, which could cause failure of the dam. To remedy the problem, the United States Army Corps of Engineers has undertaken a Dam Safety Assurance program for Bluestone. The DSA project includes raising the dam by 8 feet (2.4 m), installing anchors and thrust blocks to tie the dam into bedrock, spillway improvements and other work. The first phase of the project was completed in October 2004. The second phase, installing bedrock anchors, was completed in 2011. Three additional phases remain to be constructed.

== Recreation ==
Due to its large size, Bluestone Lake provides many recreational opportunities including boating and fishing. The West Virginia Division of Natural Resources operates Bluestone State Park and Bluestone Wildlife Management Area, each encompassing portions of the lake. Camping and other activities are available in these facilities.

=== Fishing ===
Multiple West Virginia stage record fish were caught along the Bluestone Lake.

=== Flood control ===
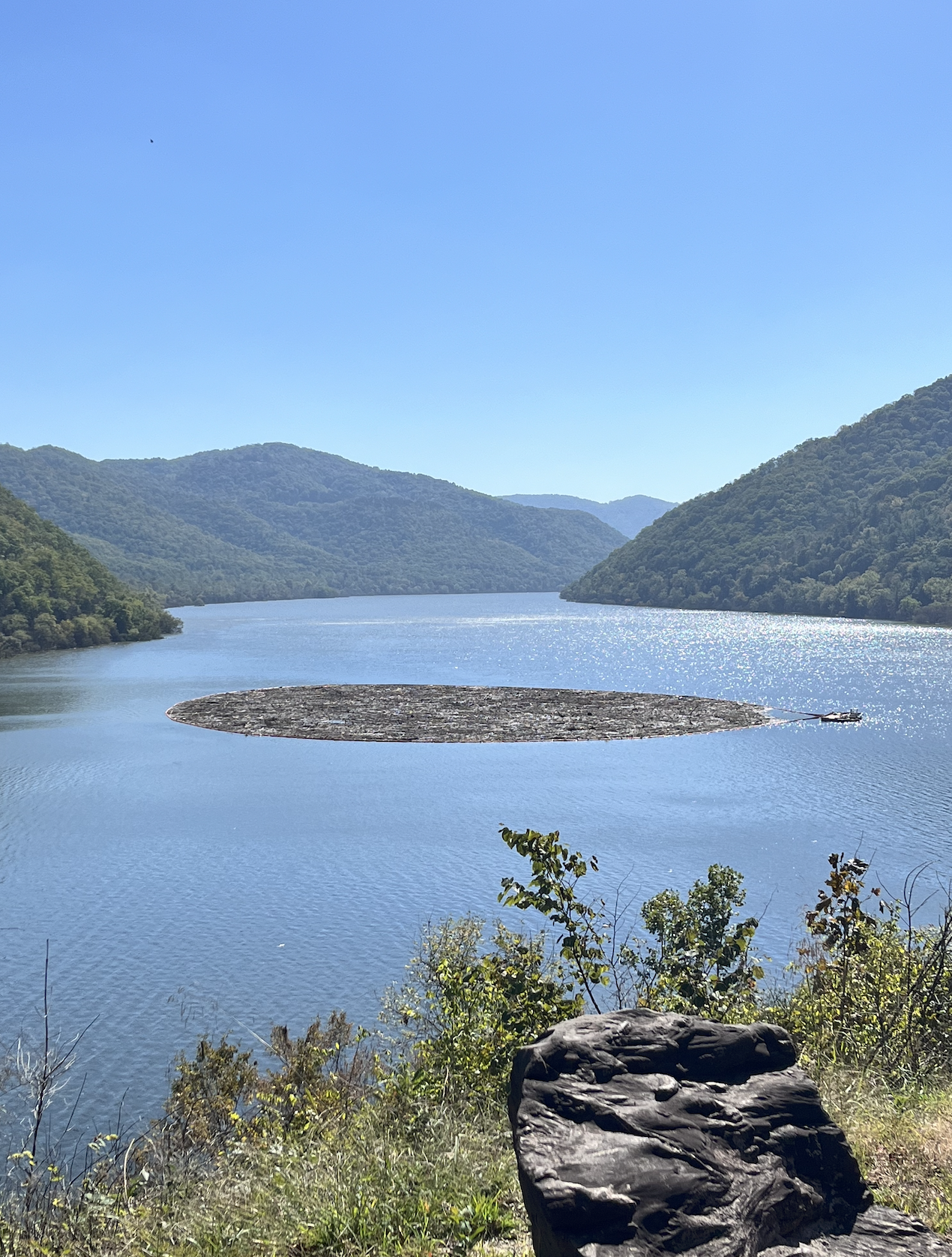
A boat corrals and removes flood debris from Bluestone Lake after significant rains upstream of the dam.

The U.S. Army Corps of Engineers states that the dam's primary purpose is flood control, and that over its lifespan, the Bluestone Dam has prevented an estimated $6 billion in flood damage downstream. In 1998, a report identified deficiencies in the dam that could prove disastrous if not addressed. Since that time, the dam has been under repair to address these risks. Approximately one-half of the dam repairs have been completed, and the entire retrofit project is slated to conclude in 2030.

== See also ==
- Bluestone State Park
- Bluestone Wildlife Management Area
- List of lakes of West Virginia
- New River
