= Surveyor Branch =

Stream in West Virginia, U.S.

Coordinates: 37°36′56″N 80°55′48″W

Surveyor Branch is a stream in the U.S. state of West Virginia.

Surveyor Branch was named for the fact government surveyors camped near it.

== See also ==
- List of rivers of West Virginia
