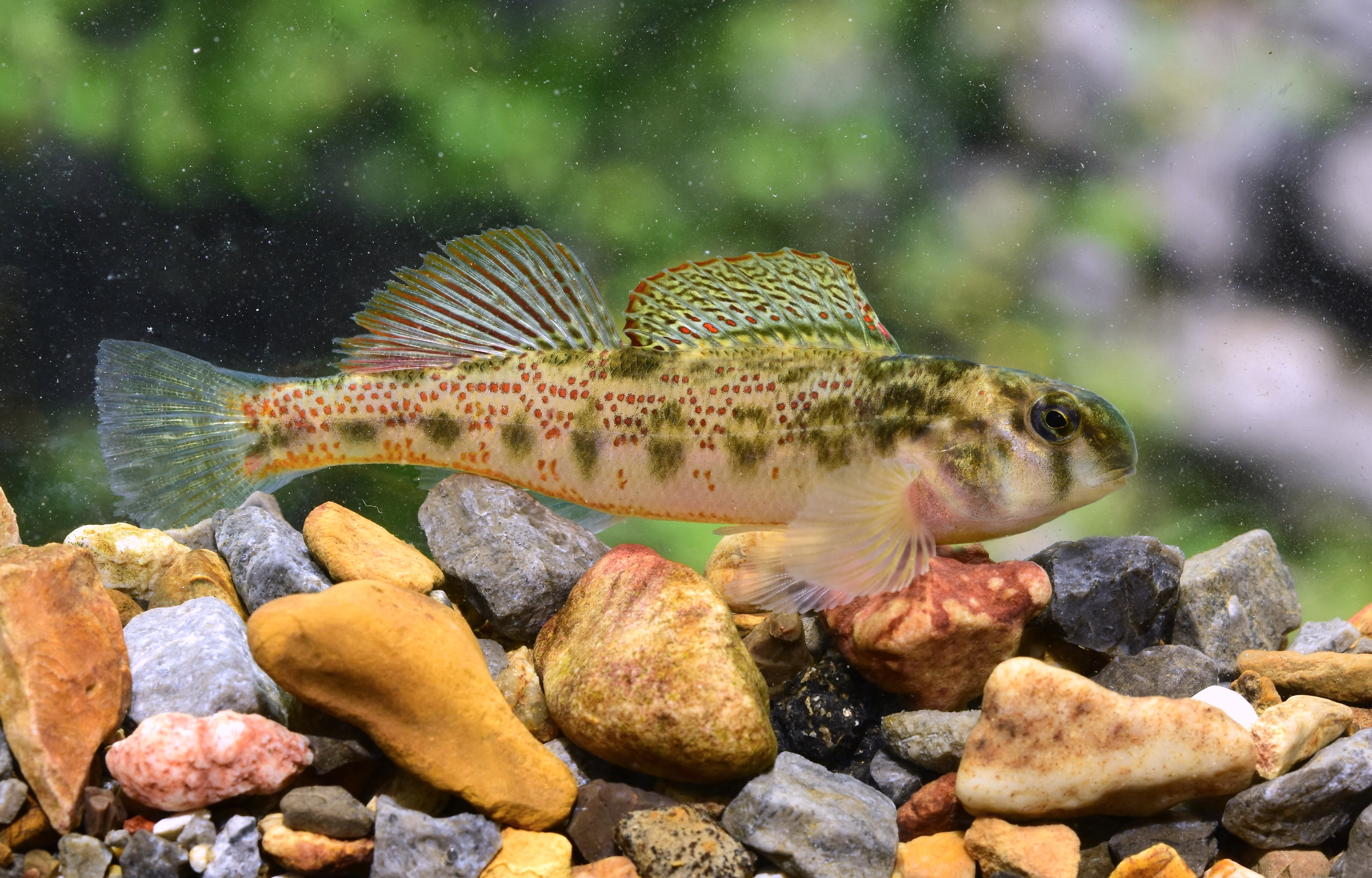

Conservation status
- Least Concern (IUCN 3.1)

Scientific classification
- Kingdom: Animalia
- Phylum: Chordata
- Class: Actinopterygii
- Order: Perciformes
- Family: Percidae
- Genus: Etheostoma
- Species: E. atripinne

Binomial name
- Etheostoma atripinne (D. S. Jordan, 1877)

Synonyms
- Arlina atripinnis D. S. Jordan, 1877; Etheostoma simoterum atripinne; Etheostoma occidentale Powers & Mayden, 2007

= Cumberland snubnose darter =

Species of fish

The Cumberland snubnose darter (Etheostoma atripinne) is a species of freshwater ray-finned fish, a darter from the subfamily Etheostomatinae, part of the family Percidae, which also contains the perches, ruffes and pikeperches. This species is found in the middle Cumberland River drainage in Tennessee, Kentucky, Virginia, North Carolina, Georgia, and Alabama. It is absent in reaches above the Big South Fork, rare in North Carolina, and absent in western tributaries of the Tennessee River. While research on the ecology of E. atripinne is not extensive, what is known is they are usually found in small to medium freshwater streams in gravel riffle areas where their eggs can attach to the substrate and be left unguarded. E. atripinne can be found within a wide range of depths in its environment, leading its being classified as benthopelagic. While its global status is secure, the American Fisheries Society labels it with a status of "Special Concern".

== Distribution ==
As is the case with many other species of darters, the geographic distribution of E. atripinne is quite narrow and localized. The species is most often found in the middle Cumberland River drainage. While E. atripinne has been found in Virginia, North Carolina, Georgia, and Alabama, these are generally interpreted as the furthest reaches of the distribution given observations of low densities. It is not found above the Big South Fork River nor in the western tributaries of the Tennessee River, although E. s. atripinne was historically found in the Little South Fork of the Cumberland River.

== Ecology ==
The Cumberland snubnose darter is found in flowing, rocky pools and adjacent riffles of small creeks with good water clarity and gravel bottoms or bottoms of bedrock strewn with rubble, and in small to medium rivers where confined to shallow gravel-bedded portions of riffles. This type of bottom is of utmost importance because their eggs attach to this substrate. Eggs do not attach well in areas that have been silted, and as a consequence, the species generally avoids these areas. They have been observed spawning in streams with water temperature ranging from 11 to 18 °C (52 to 64 °F) and prefer a relatively neutral to slightly alkaline pH. The natural predators of Cumberland snubnose darters are large piscivorous freshwater fish including, specifically, Micropterus dolomieu. Immature and adult food habits are consistent with invertivory. Examination of the stomach contents of 45 individuals segregated into four size classes showed midge larvae of the family Chironomidae make up the bulk of their diets. Depending on size, between 80% and 100% of the stomachs contained midge larvae. Mayfly nymphs, caddisfly larvae, copepods, and cladocerans were also well represented in the stomach contents. Competition with other species of darters is intense, as dietary overlap among species is relatively high, with selectivity occurring at the prey genus and species, but not family, levels. Consumption of food is highest in April, corresponding with the peak of spawning, while it is much lower during months of temperature extremes and decreased activity, such as January and July.

== Life history ==
Etheostoma atripinne reaches sexual maturity in about one year and only survives for a breeding season (maximum life expectancy is about 18 months), which occurs in April to early May. Leading up to the breeding season, males develop bright colors, and by April, all males are deep green to blue-green in color with red-orange dorsal fins and red spots along their bodies. In fact, descriptions of species in the E. simoterum complex of snubnose darters, a group of six teleost freshwater fish species, are based largely on male nuptial coloration. Females do not appear to change in color during breeding. Males court females by erecting their fins and displaying their brilliant colors. A courtship is successful if the female leads the male to a sometimes preselected site, such as a large gravel bed, for egg deposition. Spawning is generally spread out over several spawning sites. After spawning, no parental care for the fertilized eggs is given, as they are left unguarded. However, current research indicates the evolution of a greater degree of parental care pertaining to males guarding the eggs in darters such as E. atripinne. Fully matured eggs are transparent, contain oil droplets for buoyancy, and are an average of 1.2 mm in diameter. The number of eggs a female lays ranges from 110 to 240.

== Taxonomy ==
The Cumberland snubnose darter was first formally described as Arlina atripinnis in 1877 by the American ichthyologist David Starr Jordan with the type locality given as a tributary of the Cumberland River in the vicinity of Nashville, Tennessee.

== Current management ==
E. atripinne is listed as "secure" in Tennessee, so not much effort has been put into the management of the species on a state or federal level. However, the Cumberland snubnose darter is very sensitive to siltification. In fact, this may be the single biggest problem as far as human-induced negative influences on the species. It is rare or absent in murky water or where stream gravel is covered by silt. Thus, it would be very sensitive to human activities such as stream channelization, sedimentation, and impoundment, which are known threats to species' viability. Statuses in other states include "vulnerable" and "possibly extirpated" in the case of North Carolina. The American Fisheries Society lists E. s. atripinne as resilient, but ultimately with a status of "Special Concern". This is because species such as E. atripinne that specialize in benthic habitats in small to medium-sized rivers are more likely to be threatened by human activities. Unfortunately, in the southern United States, the watersheds that support the greatest numbers of species are generally associated with privately owned land, meaning the majority of fish species in the southern states are not protected by federal ownership of the land.
