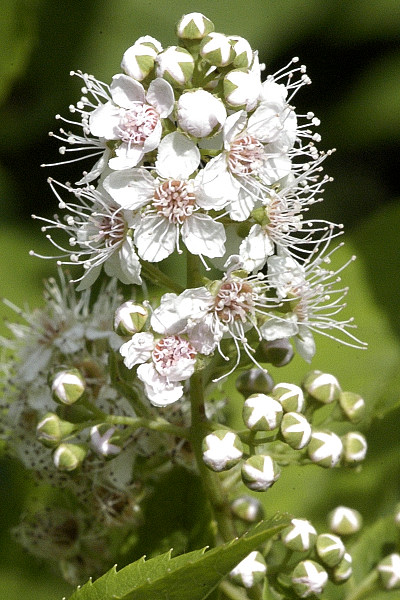

Scientific classification
- Kingdom: Plantae
- Clade: Tracheophytes
- Clade: Angiosperms
- Clade: Eudicots
- Clade: Rosids
- Order: Rosales
- Family: Rosaceae
- Genus: Spiraea
- Species: S. alba

Binomial name
- Spiraea alba Du Roi

Synonyms
- Eleiosina obovata Raf. ex Ser.; Spiraea ciliata Raf.; Spiraea cuneifolia Borkh.; Spiraea flexuosa Raf.; Spiraea lanceolata Borkh.; Spiraea lancifolia Hoffmanns. ex K.Koch; Spiraea latifolia (Sol.) Borkh.; Spiraea paniculata (Willd.) G.Don; Spiraea undulata Borkh.

= Spiraea alba =

Species of flowering plant

Spiraea alba, commonly known as meadowsweet, white meadowsweet, narrowleaf meadowsweet, the botanical pale bridewort, or pipestem, is native to the wet soils of the Allegheny Mountains and other portions of eastern North America, but is currently endangered in the state of Missouri. It is naturalized in other parts of the world.

== Description ==
Narrowleaf meadowsweet shrubs typically mature to 3-4 feet in height with a similar spread. This species is often the most conspicuous part of the vegetation in its habitat, taking up large areas of ground. Its leaves are glossy yellow-green, oblong or lance-shaped, and toothed on the edges, and its twigs are tough and yellowish brown. Fall foliage is golden yellow. The white and sometimes pink fragrant flowers grow in spike-like clusters at the ends of the branches, blooming from early summer through September. The brown fruit, which persists after flowering, is a distinctive feature of all Spiraea species.

== Ecology ==
Butterflies and other beneficial insects like bees visit the plant for nectar and pollen. In autumn brown seed capsules appear and are fed on by songbirds. Glossy green foliage turns yellow in the fall. Deer tend to leave this plant alone. Meadowsweet is a host plant for the larvae of the spring azure butterfly (Celastrina argiolus).

== Uses ==
The blooms make a good cut flower.

The hollow, upright stems were used historically as pipe stems.
