= New River (Kanawha River tributary) =

River in the eastern United States

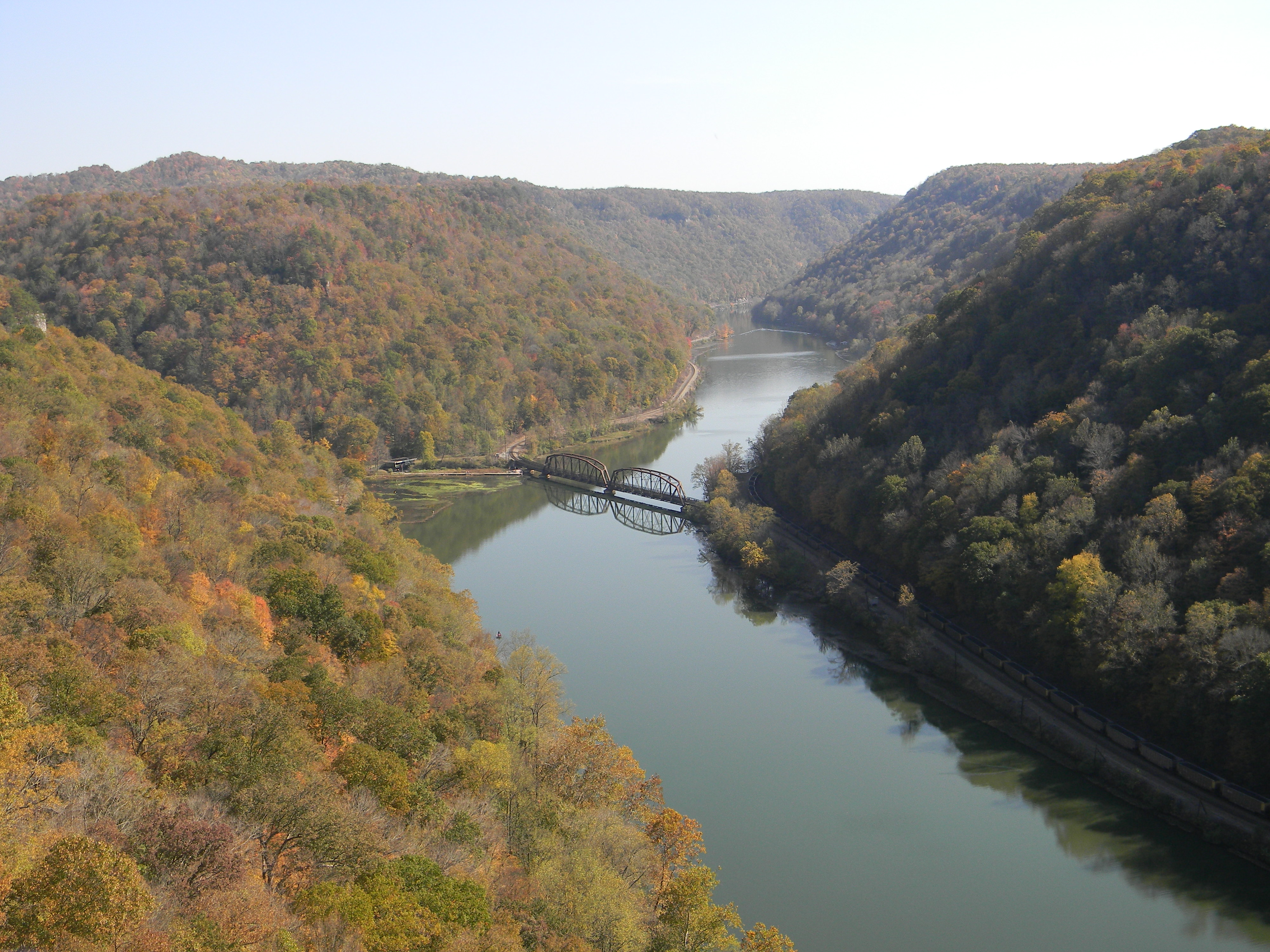
- The New River within the New River Gorge as viewed from Hawks Nest State Park in West Virginia

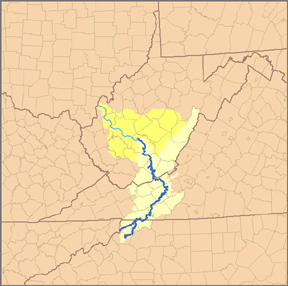
- Map of the Kanawha River watershed, with the New River (dark blue) and its watershed (light yellow) highlighted.

Location
- Country: United States
- State: North Carolina, Virginia, West Virginia
- Counties: Ashe NC, Alleghany NC, Watauga NC, Grayson VA, Carroll VA, Wythe VA, Pulaski VA, Montgomery VA, Giles VA, Mercer County, West Virginia, Summers County, West Virginia, Raleigh County, West Virginia, Fayette County, West Virginia

Physical characteristics
- Source: South Fork New River
  - location: Boone, NC
  - coordinates: 36°12′16″N 81°38′59″W
  - elevation: 3,104 ft (946 m)
- 2nd source: North Fork New River
  - location: Elk Knob, Watauga County, NC
  - coordinates: 36°19′59″N 81°41′04″W
  - elevation: 4,446 ft (1,355 m)
- Source confluence
  - location: Ashe County, NC
  - coordinates: 36°32′45″N 81°21′09″W
  - elevation: 2,546 ft (776 m)
- Mouth: Kanawha River
  - location: Gauley Bridge, West Virginia
  - coordinates: 38°09′42″N 81°11′47″W
  - elevation: 653 ft (199 m)
- Length: 320 mi (510 km)
- Discharge
  - location: Thurmond, WV, max and min at Glen Lyn, VA
  - average: 8,730 cu ft/s (247 m^{3}/s)
  - minimum: 538 cu ft/s (15.2 m^{3}/s)
  - maximum: 226,000 cu ft/s (6,400 m^{3}/s)

Basin features
- Progression: New River → Kanawha River → Ohio River → Mississippi River → Gulf of Mexico
- Tributaries
  - left: Bluestone River, East River
  - right: Little River, Indian Creek, Greenbrier River

National Wild and Scenic River
- Type: Scenic
- Designated: April 13, 1976

The New River is a river that flows through the U.S. states of North Carolina, Virginia, and West Virginia before joining with the Gauley River to form the Kanawha River at the town of Gauley Bridge, West Virginia. Part of the Ohio River watershed, it is about 360 miles (580 km) long. It is named a National Wild and Scenic River for its surrounding mountain majesty. Geologically, it is one of the oldest rivers on Earth.

The origins of the name are unclear. Possibilities include being a new river that was not on the Fry-Jefferson map of Virginia, an Indian name meaning "new waters", or the surname of an early settler. It was once called Wood's River for Colonel Abraham Wood, an English explorer from Virginia, who explored the river in the mid-17th century. Despite its name, the New River is one of the five oldest rivers in the world geologically. Nonetheless, a claim that the river is the second oldest in the world is disputed by the West Virginia Geological and Economic Survey and the National Park Service.

This low-level crossing of the Appalachians, many millions of years old, has long been a biogeographical corridor allowing numerous species of plants and animals to spread between the lowlands of the American East Coast and those of the Midwest. Unusual kinds of plants occur on the gorge's cliffs or rim-top ledges. Portions of this corridor are now also used by various railroads and highways, and some segments of the river have been dammed for hydroelectric power production.

The New River Gorge is not only quite scenic, but also offers numerous opportunities for white-water recreation such as rafting and kayaking. Many open ledges along the rim of the gorge offer popular views, with favorites including Hawks Nest State Park and various overlooks on lands of the New River Gorge National Park and Preserve.

The New River Gorge and the U.S. 19 bridge crossing it are shown on the West Virginia State Quarter, minted in 2005.

== Course ==
This ancient river begins in the Blue Ridge Mountains of North Carolina, and its North Fork and South Fork meet near the City of Boone, North Carolina. It flows generally northeastward through the New River Valley portion of the Great Appalachian Valley in western North Carolina and Virginia. It then crosses through the Ridge and Valley Province, cutting between Walker Mountain and Sinking Creek Mountain, and then between East River Mountain and Peters Mountain. It then turns and following a more northwestward course into West Virginia, where it then cuts through the Appalachian Plateau in the New River Gorge. It meets the Gauley River to become the Kanawha River in south-central West Virginia. The Kanawha then flows into the Ohio River at Point Pleasant, West Virginia. Much of the river's course is lined with steep cliffs and rock outcrops, particularly in its gorge in West Virginia.

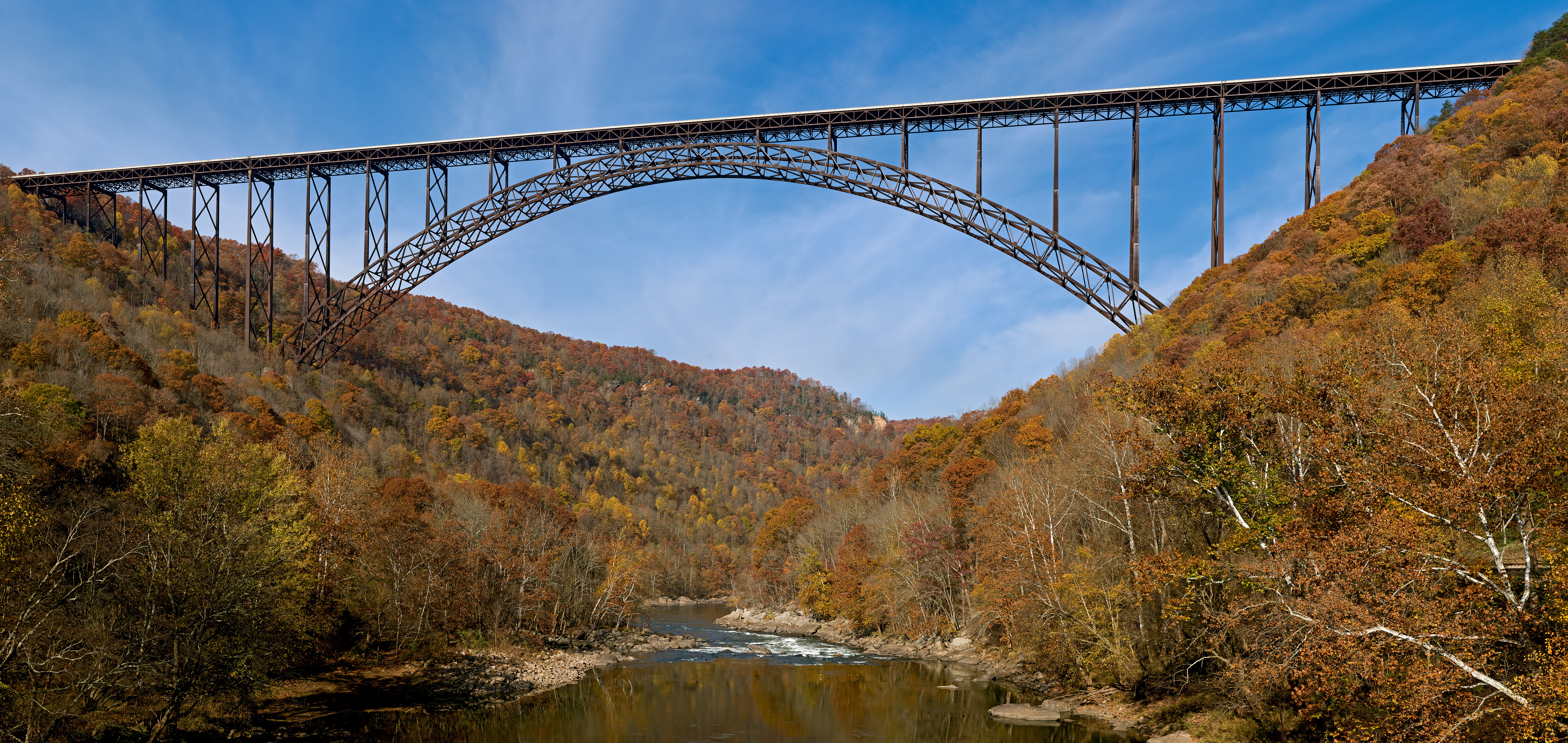
The New River Gorge Bridge on U.S. 19 in West Virginia

The New River is formed by the confluence of the South Fork New River and the North Fork New River on the Ashe County-Alleghany County line in North Carolina. It then flows through Alleghany County into southwestern Virginia, passing near Galax, Virginia. It is impounded by three small dams between Galax and Ivanhoe: at Fries, by Byllesby Dam, and by Buck Dam. Continuing north, the river enters Pulaski County, Virginia, where it is impounded by Claytor Dam, creating Claytor Lake. North of the dam the New River accepts the Little River, bends around three sides of the city of Radford, Virginia and bends again around the Radford Army Ammunition Plant, marking the boundary between Pulaski and Montgomery County, Virginia, before passing through Walker Mountain via a narrow water gap. After flowing north through Giles County, Virginia and the town of Narrows, the river crosses into West Virginia.

== Dams and bridges ==
The New River is impounded by Bluestone Dam, creating Bluestone Lake in Summers County, West Virginia. The Bluestone River tributary joins the New River in Bluestone Lake. Just below the dam the Greenbrier River joins the New River, which continues its northward course into the New River Gorge. Near the end of the gorge the river flows by the town of Fayetteville, West Virginia. A few miles northwest of Fayetteville, much of the New River's flow is diverted through the 3-mile (4.8 km) Hawks Nest Tunnel for use in power generation. The water re-enters the river just upstream of Gauley Bridge, where the New merges with the Gauley River to form the Kanawha River. The Kanawha is a tributary of the Ohio River, which in turn is a tributary of the Mississippi River.

Few highways cross the gorge, with the most dramatic bridge by far being the New River Gorge Bridge on U.S. 19, a steel arch bridge spanning 1,700 feet (518 m), with the roadway 876 feet (267 m) above the average level of the river. This structure is the fifth-longest single-arch bridge in the world, and is also the world's twenty-third-highest vehicular bridge, and the fourth highest in the Americas. At the time it was built, New River Gorge Bridge was the world's highest bridge carrying a regular roadway, a title it held until the 2001 opening of the Liuguanghe Bridge in China.

== Geology ==
Ironically, the New River is considered by some geologists to be one of the oldest rivers in the world, and certainly one of the oldest rivers in North America. The New River flows in a generally south-to-north course, at times cutting through the southwest-to-northeast-trending ridges and geological texture of the Appalachian Mountains, and flows directly through the Appalachian Plateau, contrasting with the west-to-east flow of most other major rivers to the east and northeast in Virginia and North Carolina, and on the west side of the Appalachians on the Plateau.

It may have been in its present course for at least 65 million years. In the geologic past, the New River was a much longer stream. Geologists have named it the Teays. The last advance of Pleistocene continental glacial ice buried most of this river. At that time, the waters of the New were diverted into rivers (the present-day Ohio & Kanawha Rivers) created by the glaciers.

== Natural history ==
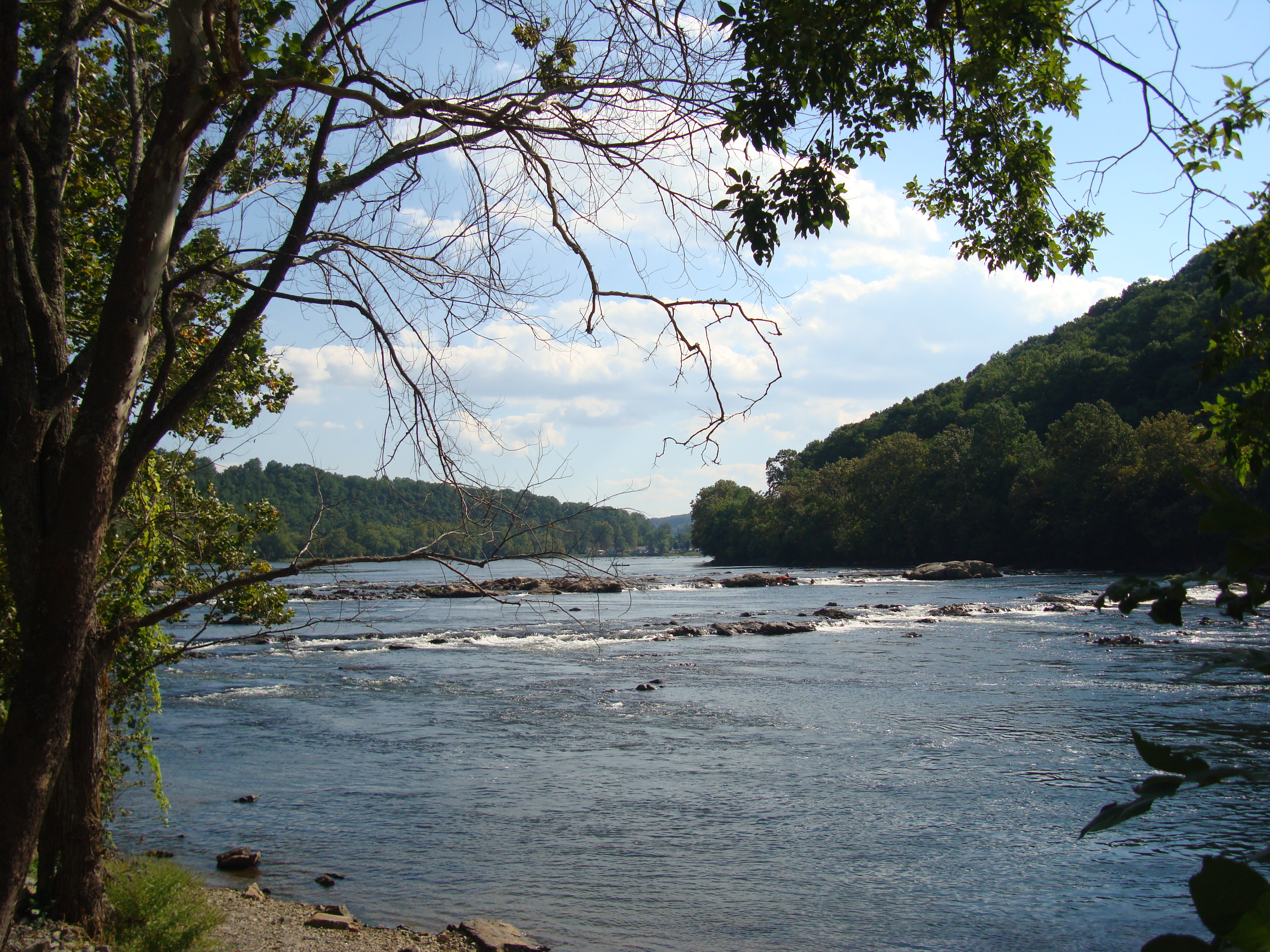
New River in Montgomery Co., Virginia

On its journey through the New River Gorge, the New River passes through an extensive geological formation. Emergent rocks and rock outcrops are found to provide diverse habitat producing rich and abundant flora and fauna species. In the gorge, there is typically a 1000 feet difference in elevation between the river bottom and the adjacent plateau. The New River dissects all physiographic provinces of the Appalachian Mountains, and therefore is believed to be a corridor facilitating the movement of southern plant and animal species into West Virginia. In addition to serving as a refuge for some species, New River Gorge provides a geographical barrier that limits the east-west distribution of other species.

Because the New River is so old, its habitats and wildlife have been able to achieve a form of stability. Millions of years of available passage have allowed many species of plants and animals to move in and persist in the area. Since the New River cuts from east to west through the Appalachians, we find species that are typically Atlantic coastal plain and piedmont, such as melic grass, living with northern mountain species. Over time, in the New River Gorge, many species of fish have been able to carve their own niches and inhabit this area. Several of these species that have evolved are endemic to this river.

=== Plants ===
New River Gorge lies at the core of the largest remaining block of relatively unfragmented, mid-latitude forest in the world. The gorge section of New River supports the most diverse plant assemblage of any river gorge in the central and southern Appalachians. This is due, in part, to the moisture gradient extremes that exist between the rim and river. This portion of southern West Virginia falls within the Mixed Mesophytic Forest Region. Recognized forest types include oak-hickory, mixed oak, oak-maple, oak-yellow pine, hemlock-hardwoods, northern hardwoods, cove hardwoods, and bottomland and floodplain hardwoods.

Also located in the gorge is the rare Appalachian Flatrock plant community, which includes sedges, cedars and pines. This plant assemblage occurs on flat sandstone ledges along the New River and is dependent on the scouring caused by occasional flooding for its long-term integrity.

=== Animals ===
A wide variety of animals live in and around the New River, the Gorge, and the surrounding forests. The New River has long served as a migration corridor for both plants and animals. For this reason, animals more commonly found much farther south may reach the northern extent of their range in the New River Gorge area. Likewise, animals more commonly associated with the northern forests may reach the southern extent of their range in this area. Other animals are found only in the New River area. These species, called endemics, were isolated from similar populations by the steep, rugged terrain of New River Gorge and/or the tumultuous rapids and waterfalls of New River. Thus isolated, these animals evolved to be adapted to the unique circumstances of New River Gorge.

Approximately 65 species of mammals are known to occur in the New River Gorge area, such as beaver, mink, muskrat, river otter. Continuous forest, abandoned mine portals, rivers and streams provide habitat for a diverse variety of amphibians like hellbenders (the largest aquatic salamanders in the United States). There are nearly 40 species of reptiles like the eastern fence lizard, five-lined skinks, copperhead snake, black rat snake, river cooter, stinkpot turtles (common musk turtle) and snapping turtles. And many benthic macroinvertebrates including worms, crustaceans and immature forms of aquatic insects, such as dragon fly, stonefly and mayfly nymphs.

The New River and the gorge area provides critical habitat for birds such as bald eagles, osprey, great blue herons, kingfishers, numerous ducks and migrating waterfowl like loons, cormorants, hooded mergansers and other migratory birds including the Cerulean warbler, a species in decline elsewhere in its range.

==== Fish ====
The New River basin has eight endemic species of fish, which are the Appalachia darter, bigmouth chub, bluestone sculpin, candy darter, Kanawha sculpin, Kanawha darter, Kanawha minnow, and New River shiner.

== History ==
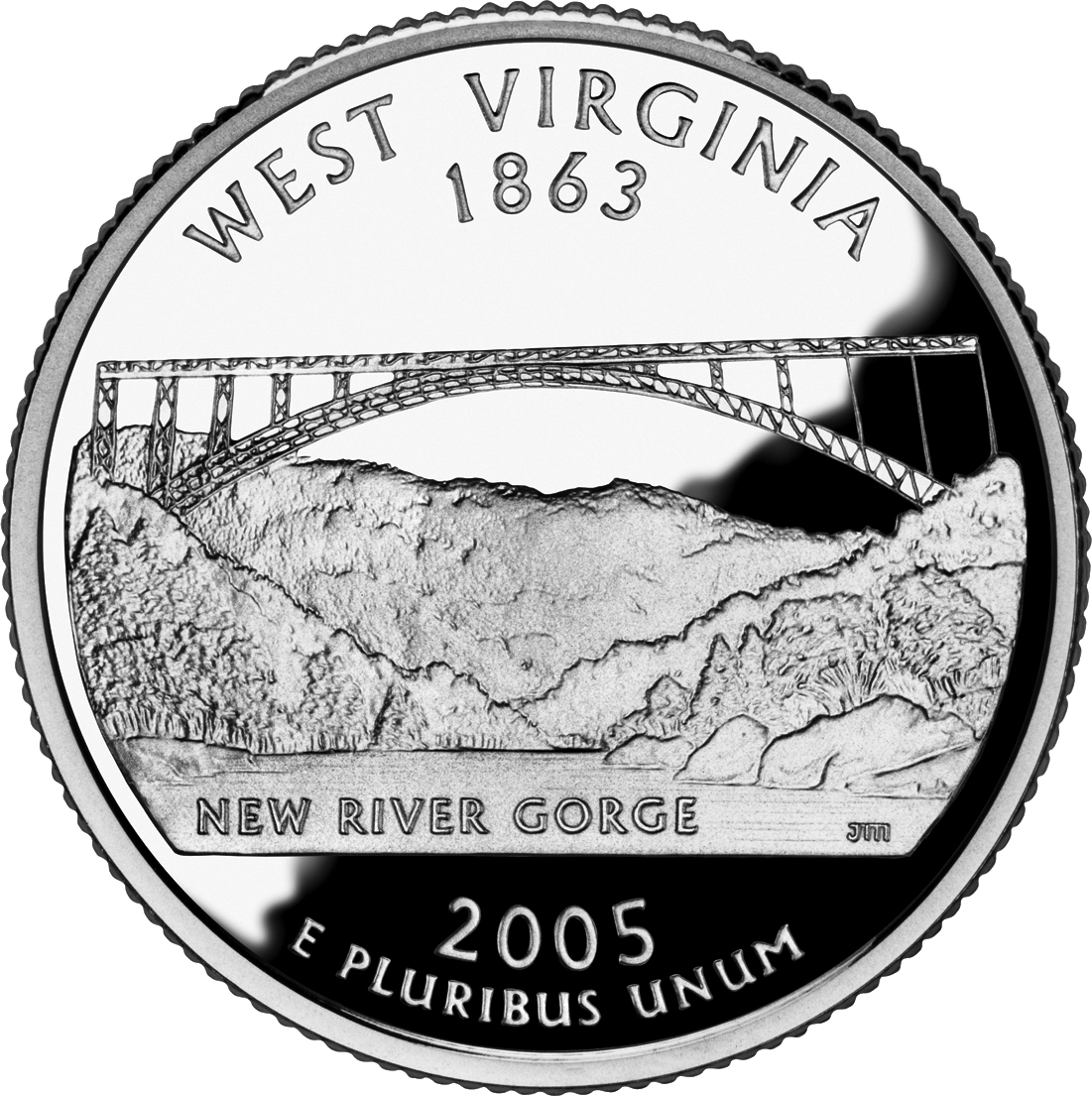
The New River Gorge commemorated on the West Virginia state quarter in 2005

The fur trading Batts and Fallam expedition of 1671, sent by Colonel Abraham Wood, was the first recorded exploration of the river. Variant names of the New River include "Wood River" and "Wood's River", after Abraham Wood. Mary Draper Ingles traversed the gorge during her 1755 escape from captivity among the Shawnees. Hiking or driving through New River Gorge today will provide glimpses of old stone walls, foundations of homes and buildings, coal mine entrances, and coke ovens decaying alongside the railroad tracks.

The New River and its Gorge and Valley have been turned into protected parks and recreation areas along much of the river. Congress has designated the New River Gorge the "New River Gorge National River". The choice of national river designation came about through a long series of discussions among interested parties. A grassroots coalition formed and pleaded the case for protection of the area in Congress. The initial goal, however, was not protective designation of the gorge in West Virginia, but stopping an engineering project on the Virginia-North Carolina border. Plans had been proposed in the early 1960s to dam the New River in Virginia, backing up water into North Carolina for pumped storage, the production of hydroelectric power, and the regular flushing of pollution downstream. Proponents called it the Blue Ridge Pumped Storage Project. Many citizens in West Virginia felt that such a dam would negatively affect the gorge. Water flow and quality were major concerns. These West Virginia opponents to the dam joined those in Virginia and North Carolina and helped block the dam before shifting attention toward protection of the New River in West Virginia. The coalition ultimately chose a designation for the New River Gorge that would have a chance of success in Congress. That designation passed Congress in 1978.

== Recreation ==
The New River exhibits class II to IV rapids in the summer, making it a popular whitewater rafting and kayaking destination. The spring runoff brings class IV and V rapids. Several commercial outfitters offer guided river trips. New River Gorge National Park and Preserve contains numerous trails for hiking and mountain biking, as well as over 1400 established rock climbs.

The New River is spanned near Fayetteville, West Virginia, by the New River Gorge Bridge (US 19). "Bridge Walk" tours are offered on the 2-foot (0.61 m) wide steel catwalk running under the bridge deck. The bridge is also open for BASE jumping once annually on Bridge Day.

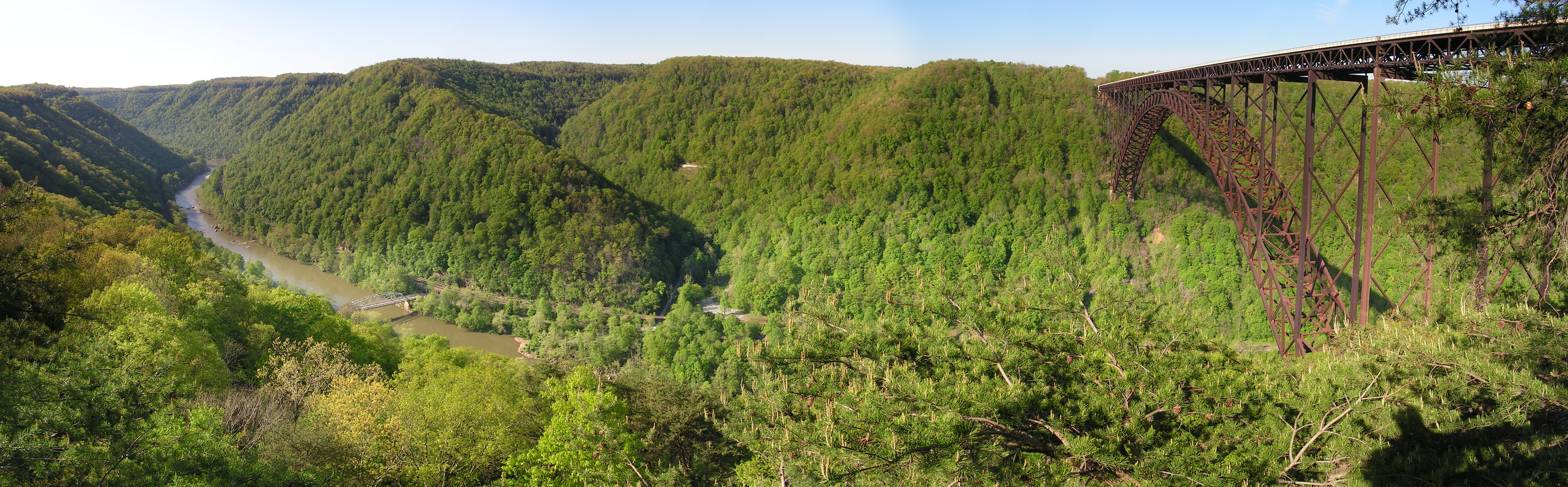
New River Gorge Bridge Overlook

=== Fishing ===
Multiple West Virginia state record fish were caught along the New River.

== Parks, forests, and trails ==
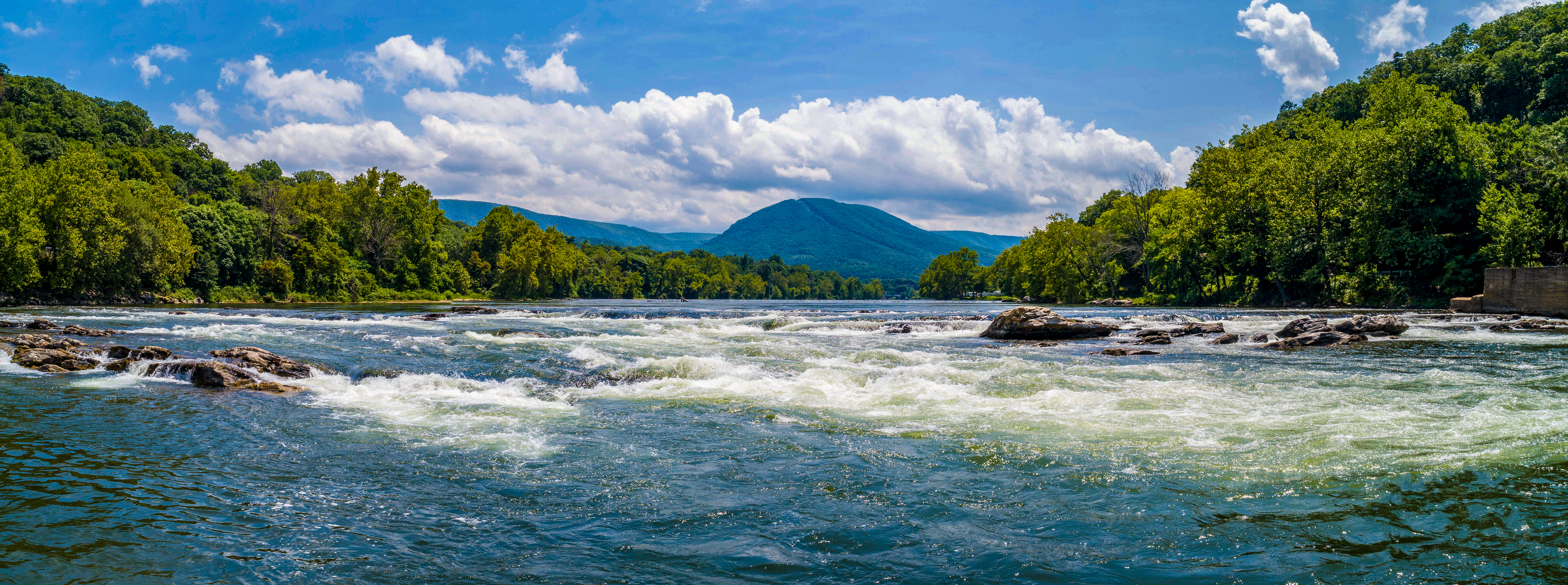
The New River in Giles County, Virginia

Listed from upstream to downstream:

- Pisgah National Forest (on the South Fork)
- Blue Ridge Parkway (on the South Fork)
- Elk Knob State Park (on the North Fork)
- New River State Park, North Carolina
- New River Trail State Park, Virginia
- Shot Tower Historical State Park, Virginia
- Claytor Lake State Park, Virginia
- Jefferson National Forest
- Appalachian National Scenic Trail
- Bluestone Wildlife Management Area
- Bluestone State Park, West Virginia
- New River Gorge National Park and Preserve
- Babcock State Park, West Virginia
- Hawks Nest State Park, West Virginia
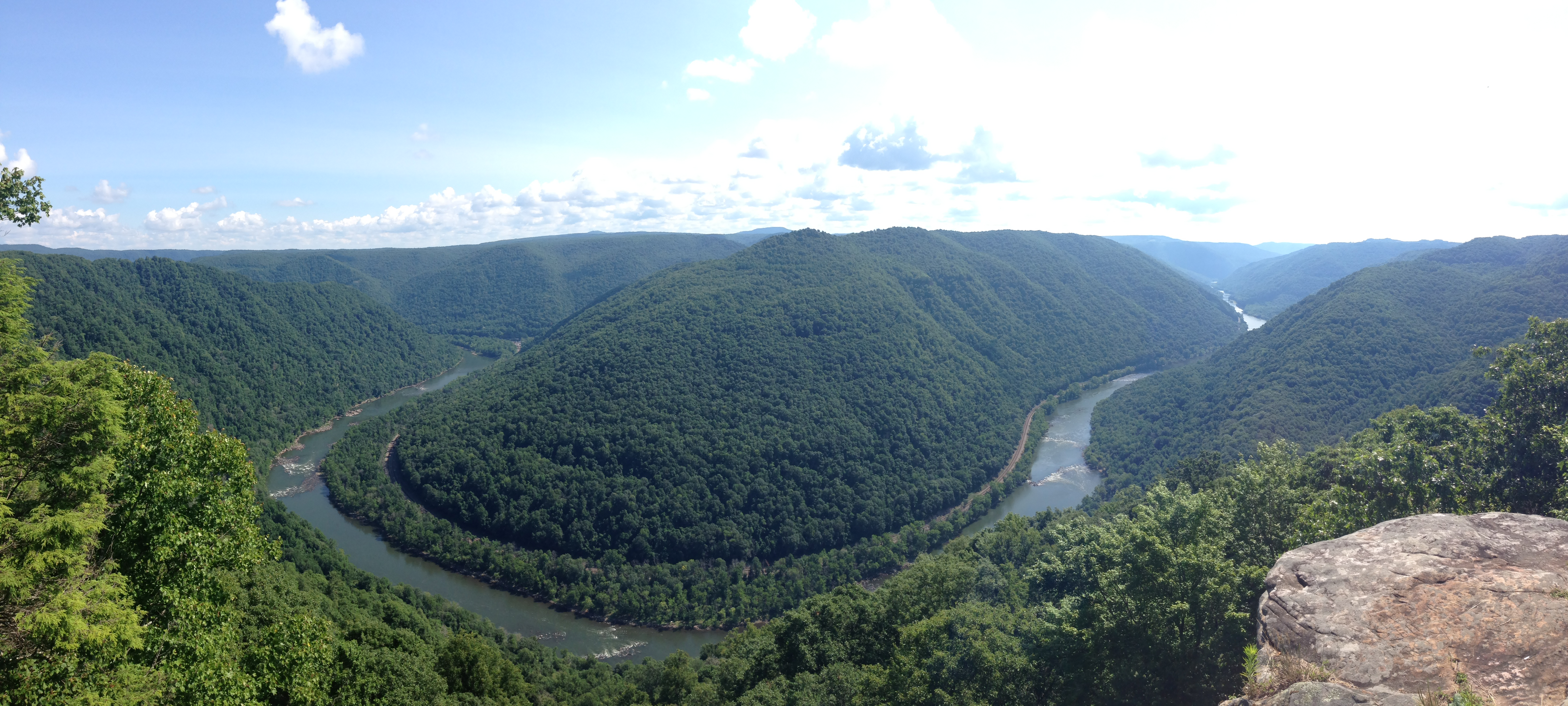
New River Gorge Bridge Overlook

== Environmental factors ==
Much of the river's course through West Virginia is designated as the New River Gorge National Park and Preserve, and the New River is one of the nation's American Heritage Rivers. In 1975, North Carolina designated a 26.5-mile (42.6 km) segment of the river as "New River State Scenic River", by including it in the state's Natural and Scenic Rivers System. The segment was added to the National Wild and Scenic Rivers System the following year.

The quality of the surface water resources of the New River has been studied in recent years by both the State of West Virginia and New River Gorge Park Resource Management staff. Data from these studies suggest the presence of metals, organic contaminants and influx of raw sewage are common in many tributaries of the New River. Metals contamination, resulting from mining activities and or urban surface flows, are present in most tributaries. Other sources of pollutants within park boundaries include unlined landfills, illegal dumps, pesticide sprayed directly into the New River, agricultural runoff, road salt runoff, direct discharge of residential sewage, inadequate municipal sewage treatment facilities, recreation waste streams, and industrial discharges. Pollution of rural streams by fecal coliform bacteria is a widespread issue. Since fecal coliform bacteria live in the gut of warm-blooded animals, fecal contamination of rural streams can come not only from humans, but also from livestock, pets, and wildlife (including birds). Several research efforts have been made to understand the role of these various potential sources of bacteria. One of these studies was conducted in New River Gorge by the U.S. Geological Survey, in cooperation with the National Park Service. The results indicate that human-caused wastewater pollution is present in each of the four New River Gorge tributaries sampled. The report also found other sources of contamination in some streams.

Most of the original deciduous forest stands and understory species have been impacted by past and current activities associated with timbering, mining, agriculture, transportation, utilities, and the exclusion of fire. Internal development projects, increasing recreational activities, and expanding commercial and residential influences on the boundary continue to put pressure on a highly fragmented base resource. Power lines and rights-of-way present additional problems. There is currently only limited information on all such areas throughout the park. Right-of-ways are routinely maintained with herbicides application or mechanically treated. There are currently no Special Use Permits in place to regulate this activity. Herbicides are managed through the Integrated Pest Management (IPM) program. The park lies directly in the path of the leading edge of spongy moth infestation. Baseline data on the condition of resources, which would be the indicators of the effects of defoliation, does not exist. Critical documents, such as the Environmental Assessment for spongy moth management, require detailed information and hard scientific data in order to justify management actions.

Many areas within New River Gorge have been impacted by either strip or deep mining for coal, as well as by oil and gas operations. The park has completed an Abandoned Mine Lands Inventory (AML Inventory) that identifies 115 sites that are abandoned. Many of these sites were abandoned prior to the 1977 Surface Mining Reclamation Act (SMCRA), and are completely or partially unreclaimed. Since 1987, the National Park Service and the Office of Surface Mining (OSM) have worked together to mitigate the most severe safety hazards identified on this inventory.

Air pollution sources resulting from activities within the park includes windblown soil and dust from construction activities, smoke from residential wood burning, automobile emissions, and forest fires. A significant issue for the park is solid waste management. Hundreds of illegal dumps and roadside trash create both aesthetic and health and safety problems. Hazardous waste is also an issue. The area has active rail lines and abandoned mine operations. There is great potential for hazardous material spills to occur within the gorge. Also, some potential development sites within the New River Gorge have been surveyed during preliminary development concept planning. Asbestos has been found in several historic structures within the park, and this has lengthened the time and costs involved in renovation of these buildings.

Over time, the New River Gorge has provided a refuge for plants and animals as habitats have shifted with changing weather patterns. As global climate change progresses, the New River Gorge will provide critical habitat for species displaced from warmer climates.

== Variant names ==
According to the Geographic Names Information System, the New River has also been known as:

- Conhaway River
- Great Konhaway River
- Kanawha River
- Kunhaway River
- Mon-don-ga-cha-te
- Wood River
- Wood's River
- Woods River

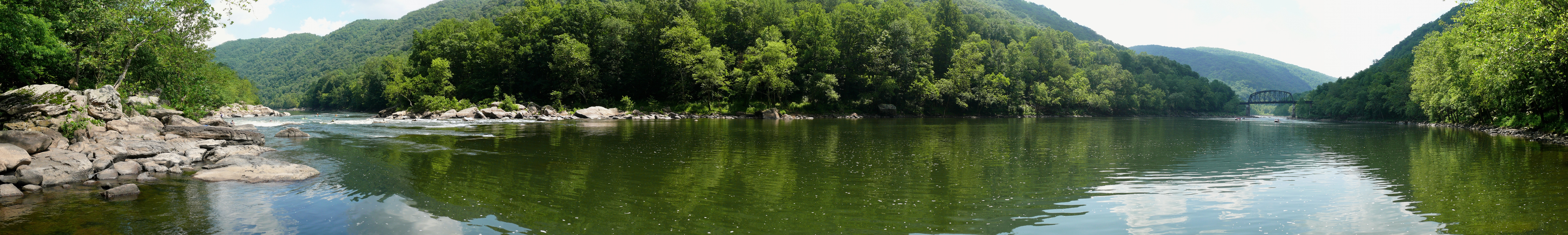
The New River in the New River Gorge.

== See also ==
- List of North Carolina rivers
- List of Virginia rivers
- List of West Virginia rivers
- New River Gorge Bridge
- New River Gorge National Park and Preserve
- Sandstone, West Virginia
