= Glenwood, Mercer County, West Virginia =

Unincorporated community in West Virginia, United States

Glenwood, West Virginia
- Unincorporated community
- Location within the state of West Virginia Glenwood, West Virginia (the United States)
- Coordinates: 37°20′09″N 81°08′57″W
- Country: United States
- State: West Virginia
- County: Mercer
- Elevation: 2,428 ft (740 m)
- Time zone: UTC-5 (Eastern (EST))
  - Summer (DST): UTC-4 (EDT)
- Area codes: 304 & 681
- GNIS feature ID: 1554574

Glenwood is an unincorporated community in Mercer County, West Virginia, United States. Glenwood is 3.5 miles (5.6 km) southwest of Princeton.
