= Bluestone River =

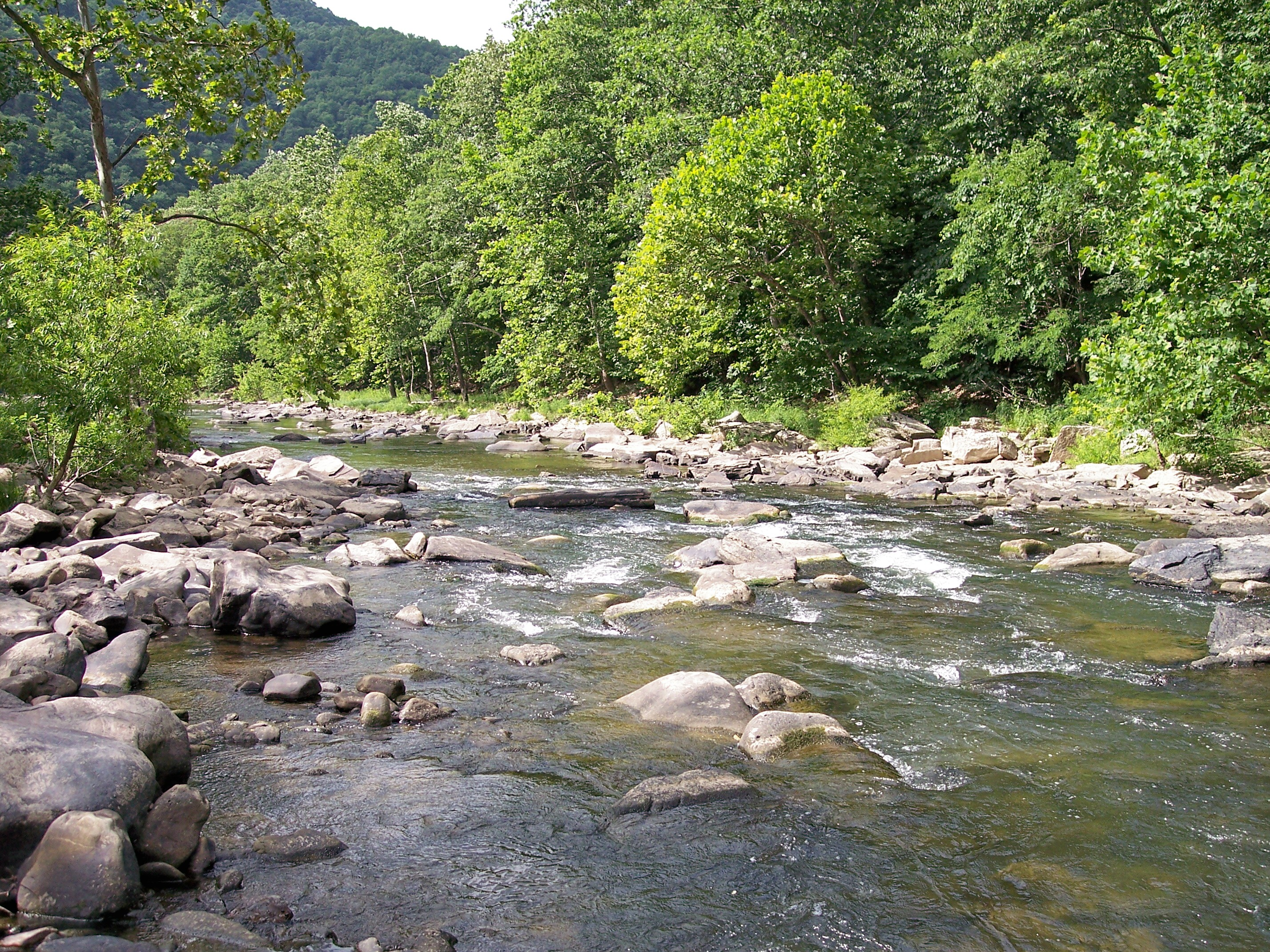
- Bluestone River in Pipestem Resort State Park

Location
- Country: United States
- State: Virginia, West Virginia
- Counties: Tazewell VA, Mercer WV, Summers WV

Physical characteristics
- Source: East River Mountain
  - location: Tazewell County, Virginia
  - coordinates: 37°10′19″N 81°24′58″W
  - elevation: 3,589 ft (1,094 m)
- Mouth: New River in Bluestone Lake
  - location: Summers County, West Virginia
  - coordinates: 37°36′44″N 80°54′52″W
  - elevation: 1,424 ft (434 m)
- Length: 77 mi (124 km)
- Discharge
  - location: Pipestem, West Virginia
  - minimum: 7 cu ft/s (0.20 m^{3}/s)daily mean (September 22, 1955)
  - maximum: 19,300 cu ft/s (550 m^{3}/s)peak (April 5, 1977)

Basin features
- Progression: Bluestone River → New River → Kanawha River → Ohio River → Mississippi River → Gulf of Mexico
- Tributaries
  - left: Little Bluestone River, Surveyor Branch
  - right: Blacklick Creek (West Virginia), Brush Creek (West Virginia), Pipestem Creek

National Wild and Scenic River
- Type: Scenic
- Designated: October 26, 1988

The Bluestone River is a tributary of the New River, 77 mi (124 km) long, in southwestern Virginia and southern West Virginia in the United States. Via the New, Kanawha and Ohio rivers, it is part of the watershed of the Mississippi River. An 11 mi (18 km) portion of its lower course in West Virginia is designated as the Bluestone National Scenic River.

== Course ==
The Bluestone rises on East River Mountain in Tazewell County, Virginia and flows generally northeastwardly through Mercer and Summers counties in West Virginia, passing the towns of Bluefield in Virginia and Bramwell and Montcalm in West Virginia. It joins the New River about 4 mi (6.4 km) south of Hinton as part of Bluestone Lake, which is formed by a U.S. Army Corps of Engineers dam on the New. The Bluestone's National Scenic River segment is located mostly in Summers County, as is Pipestem Resort State Park, which lies along a gorge formed by the river.

== Pollution ==
The Bluestone has been compromised by PCB contamination, largely left over from former coal mining activities. As a result of this contamination, Virginia does not recommend eating any carp in the upstream vicinity of Bluefield, Virginia. West Virginia recommends eating no more than one meal of carp per month.

In Virginia, the state Department of Environmental Quality does not recommend any contact recreation (such as swimming or wading) in the Bluestone due to high levels of fecal coliform bacteria.

== Little Bluestone River ==
The Little Bluestone River is a minor tributary of the Bluestone in Summers County, fewer than 10 mi (15 km) in length from its formation by the confluence of two streams, White Oak Branch and Jumping Branch.

== Variant names ==
According to the Geographic Names Information System, the Bluestone River has also been known as:

- Big Bluestone River
- Blue Stone Creek
- Blue Stone River
- Bluestone Creek

Native American names have included the following:

- Mec-ce-ne-ke-ke-ce-pe-we
- Mec-cen-ne-ke-ke
- Mo-mom-ga-sen-eka-ce-pe

== See also ==
- List of Virginia rivers
- List of West Virginia rivers
- List of National Wild and Scenic Rivers
