= National Register of Historic Places listings in Pocahontas County, West Virginia =

Location of Pocahontas County in West Virginia

This is a list of the National Register of Historic Places listings in Pocahontas County, West Virginia.

This is intended to be a complete list of the properties and districts on the National Register of Historic Places in Pocahontas County, West Virginia, United States. The locations of National Register properties and districts for which the latitude and longitude coordinates are included below, may be seen in an online map.

There are 24 properties and districts listed on the National Register in the county, 1 of which is a National Historic Landmark.

This National Park Service list is complete through NPS recent listings posted March 21, 2025.

Contents: Counties in West Virginia

Barbour - Berkeley - Boone - Braxton - Brooke - Cabell - Calhoun - Clay - Doddridge - Fayette - Gilmer - Grant - Greenbrier - Hampshire - Hancock - Hardy - Harrison - Jackson - Jefferson - Kanawha - Lewis - Lincoln - Logan - Marion - Marshall - Mason - McDowell - Mercer - Mineral - Mingo - Monongalia - Monroe - Morgan - Nicholas - Ohio - Pendleton - Pleasants - Pocahontas - Preston - Putnam - Raleigh - Randolph - Ritchie - Roane - Summers - Taylor - Tucker - Tyler - Upshur - Wayne - Webster - Wetzel - Wirt - Wood - Wyoming

== Current listings ==
	Name on the Register	Image	Date listed	Location	City or town	Description
1	Richard Beard House		March 20, 2002 (#02000255)	Off County Road 31 on Kyle Beard Rd. 38°05′16″N 80°14′15″W	Hillsboro	
2	Pearl Buck House	Pearl Buck House	June 15, 1970 (#70000663)	8129 Seneca Trail (U.S. Route 219); 38°08′30″N 80°12′19″W	Hillsboro	
3	Camp Allegheny	Camp Allegheny	September 28, 1990 (#90001446)	County Route 3, just east of County Route 5 at Top of Allegheny; 38°28′26″N 79°43′28″W	Bartow	
4	Camp Bartow Historic District	Camp Bartow Historic District	May 10, 1996 (#95001325)	Junction of U.S. Route 250 and West Virginia Routes 28 and 92; 38°32′03″N 79°46′04″W	Bartow	
5	Cass Historic District	Cass Historic District	November 28, 1980 (#80004038)	WV 66 and County Route 1; 38°23′29″N 79°55′08″W	Cass	
6	Cass Scenic Railroad	Cass Scenic Railroad	July 12, 1974 (#74002019)	Along railroad tracks from Cass to Bald Knob; 38°25′58″N 79°56′14″W	Cass	
7	Droop Mountain Battlefield	Droop Mountain Battlefield	January 26, 1970 (#70000664)	About 14 miles south of Marlinton on U.S. Route 219; 38°06′36″N 80°16′20″W	Marlinton	
8	GW Jeep Site	GW Jeep Site	December 23, 1993 (#93001443)	Elleber Sods Rd. 38°24′55″N 79°42′27″W	Greenbank	Extends into Highland County, Virginia
9	Frank and Anna Hunter House	Frank and Anna Hunter House	May 13, 1976 (#76001945)	U.S. Route 219; 38°13′14″N 80°06′03″W	Marlinton	
10	Huntersville Old County Jail		April 6, 2023 (#100008823)	Barlow Lane Rd. 38°11′26″N 80°01′02″W	Huntersville	
11	Huntersville Presbyterian Church	Huntersville Presbyterian Church	October 4, 1978 (#78002809)	County Route 21 at WV 39; 38°11′24″N 80°01′04″W	Huntersville	
12	IOOF Lodge Building	IOOF Lodge Building	March 24, 2000 (#00000249)	Junction of 8th St. and Second Ave. 38°13′25″N 80°05′40″W	Marlinton	
13	Locust Creek Covered Bridge	Locust Creek Covered Bridge	June 4, 1981 (#81000607)	County Route 31 at County Route 20; 38°04′46″N 80°15′01″W	Hillsboro	
14	Marlinton Chesapeake and Ohio Railroad Station	Marlinton Chesapeake and Ohio Railroad Station	August 29, 1979 (#79002598)	8th St. and 4th Ave. 38°13′21″N 80°05′34″W	Marlinton	Destroyed by fire
15	Marlinton Opera House	Marlinton Opera House	March 24, 2000 (#00000253)	Third Ave. 38°13′21″N 80°05′41″W	Marlinton	
16	McNeel Mill	McNeel Mill	August 8, 1985 (#85001783)	U.S. Route 219; 38°09′26″N 80°10′55″W	Mill Point	
17	New Deal Resources in Seneca State Forest Historic District	New Deal Resources in Seneca State Forest Historic District	September 4, 2018 (#100002854)	10135 Browns Creek Rd. 38°17′47″N 79°55′42″W	Dunmore	
18	New Deal Resources in Watoga State Park Historic District	New Deal Resources in Watoga State Park Historic District	February 4, 2011 (#10001227)	HC 82 (9 miles southwest of WV 39); 38°07′01″N 80°07′41″W	Marlinton	
19	Pleasant Green Methodist Episcopal Church	Pleasant Green Methodist Episcopal Church	December 12, 2012 (#12001052)	Seebert Rd. 38°08′30″N 80°11′23″W	Seebert	
20	Pocahontas County Courthouse and Jail	Pocahontas County Courthouse and Jail	July 15, 1994 (#94000724)	900C Tenth Ave. 38°13′04″N 80°05′18″W	Marlinton	
21	Pocahontas Times Print Shop	Pocahontas Times Print Shop	September 22, 1977 (#77001379)	810 2nd Ave. 38°13′23″N 80°05′42″W	Marlinton	
22	Reber Radio Telescope	Reber Radio Telescope	November 9, 1972 (#72001291)	Green Bank Observatory, northeast of Green Bank on WV 28/WV 92; 38°25′49″N 79°49′04″W	Green Bank	
23	Seebert Lane Colored School		December 12, 2012 (#12001053)	Seebert Rd. 38°08′47″N 80°11′39″W	Seebert	
24	Warwick's Fort		November 18, 2024 (#100011011)	450 Fort Warwick Passage; 38°24′56″N 79°51′01″W	Green Bank	

== See also ==
- List of National Historic Landmarks in West Virginia
- National Register of Historic Places listings in West Virginia
