= Stillwell, West Virginia =

- Unincorporated community
- Location within West Virginia Location within the United States
- Coordinates: 38°12′30″N 80°05′54″W
- Country: United States
- State: West Virginia
- County: Pocahontas
- Elevation: 2,133 ft (650 m)
- Time zone: UTC-5 (Eastern (EST))
  - Summer (DST): UTC-4 (EDT)
- Area codes: 304 & 681
- GNIS feature ID: 1553058

Stillwell is an unincorporated community in Pocahontas County, West Virginia, United States. Stillwell is located on the east bank of the Greenbrier River, 1 mile (1.6 km) south of Marlinton.
