= Walnut, West Virginia =

- Unincorporated community
- Location within West Virginia Location within the United States
- Coordinates: 38°25′23″N 80°04′26″W
- Country: United States
- State: West Virginia
- County: Pocahontas
- Elevation: 3,110 ft (950 m)
- Time zone: UTC-5 (Eastern (EST))
  - Summer (DST): UTC-4 (EDT)
- Area codes: 304 & 681
- GNIS feature ID: 1555910

Walnut is an unincorporated community in Pocahontas County, West Virginia, United States. Walnut is 14 miles (23 km) north of Marlinton.
