= Raywood, West Virginia =

- Unincorporated community
- Location within West Virginia Location within the United States
- Coordinates: 38°22′06″N 79°56′02″W
- Country: United States
- State: West Virginia
- County: Pocahontas
- Elevation: 2,385 ft (727 m)
- Time zone: UTC-5 (Eastern (EST))
  - Summer (DST): UTC-4 (EDT)
- Area codes: 304 & 681
- GNIS feature ID: 1555449

Raywood is an unincorporated community in Pocahontas County, West Virginia, United States. Raywood is 13 miles (21 km) northeast of Marlinton.
