= Clawson, West Virginia =

Unincorporated community in West Virginia, United States

- Unincorporated community
- Location within West Virginia Location within the United States
- Coordinates: 38°16′06″N 80°01′48″W
- Country: United States
- State: West Virginia
- County: Pocahontas
- Elevation: 2,188 ft (667 m)
- Time zone: UTC-5 (Eastern (EST))
  - Summer (DST): UTC-4 (EDT)
- Area codes: 304 & 681
- GNIS feature ID: 1558353

Clawson is an unincorporated community in Pocahontas County, West Virginia, United States. Clawson is located on the south bank of the Greenbrier River, 4.5 miles (7.2 km) northeast of Marlinton.
