= Pleasant Green Methodist Episcopal Church =

Historic church in West Virginia, United States

- U.S. National Register of Historic Places
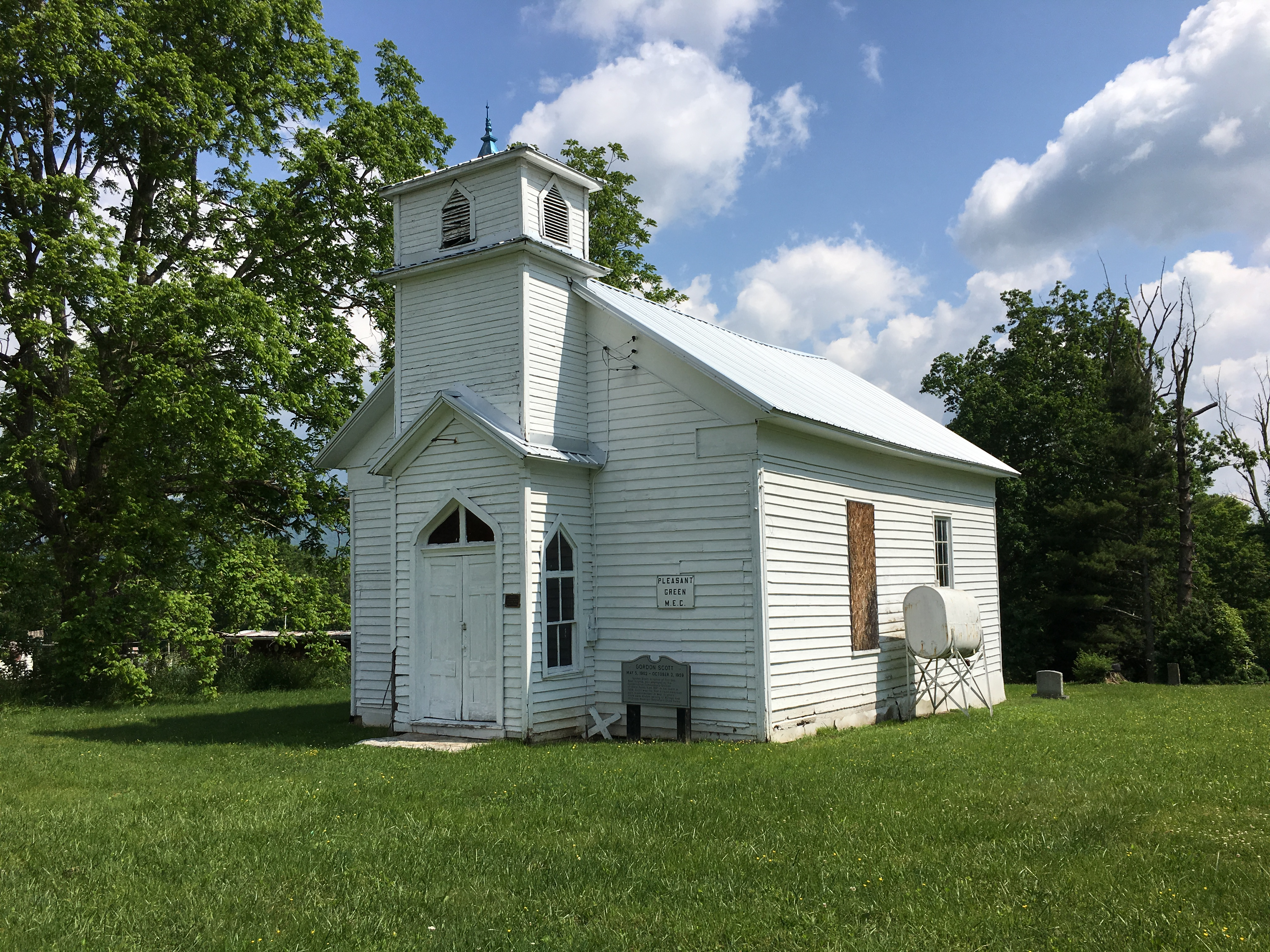
- Pleasant Green Methodist Episcopal Church, May 28, 2019

- Location within West Virginia Location within the United States
- Location: Seebert Road, Pocahontas County, West Virginia
- Coordinates: 38°8′30″N 80°11′23″W
- Area: 1 acre (0.40 ha)
- Built: 1888
- Architectural style: Gothic Revival
- NRHP reference No.: 12001052
- Added to NRHP: December 12, 2012

Pleasant Green Methodist Episcopal Church is a historic African-American Methodist Episcopal church located at Seebert, Pocahontas County, West Virginia. It was built in 1888, and is a one-story, front-gable building with a standing seam metal roof, and clapboard siding. The rectangular plan building measures approximately 26 feet, 8 inches, by 34 feet, 3 inches and has Gothic Revival style details. The building features a central entrance bell tower. Also on the property are the contributing parsonage (c. 1920) and cemetery.

It was listed on the National Register of Historic Places in 2012.
