= Seebert Lane Colored School =

- U.S. National Register of Historic Places
- Location within West Virginia Location within the United States
- Location: Seebert Rd., Seebert, West Virginia
- Coordinates: 38°08′47″N 80°11′39″W
- Area: Less than one acre
- Built: c. 1898
- Built by: Jordan, Robert Samuel
- NRHP reference No.: 12001053
- Added to NRHP: December 12, 2012

Seebert Lane Colored School, also known as Pleasant Green School and Hillsboro School, is a historic one-room school for African-American students located at Seebert, Pocahontas County, West Virginia. It was built about 1898, and is a one-story, front-gable frame building. The rectangular plan building measures approximately 24 feet, 4 inches, by 40 feet, 4 inches. The building has a symmetrical facade, small porch supported by two simple, rounded columns, and a cupola. Also on the property is a contributing fuel shed. In 1921, the children of Seebert Lane Colored School were photo documented by Lewis W. Hine as part of his work with the National Child Labor Committee (NCLC). There is no reliable date for when the building stopped operating as a school, though it likely coincided with desegregation in 1954.

It was listed on the National Register of Historic Places in 2012.
