= Knapp, West Virginia =

- Unincorporated community
- Location within West Virginia Location within the United States
- Coordinates: 38°14′02″N 80°03′03″W
- Country: United States
- State: West Virginia
- County: Pocahontas
- Elevation: 2,149 ft (655 m)
- Time zone: UTC-5 (Eastern (EST))
  - Summer (DST): UTC-4 (EDT)
- Area codes: 304 & 681
- GNIS feature ID: 1551662

Knapp is an unincorporated community in Pocahontas County, West Virginia, United States. Knapp is located on the Greenbrier River, 2.5 miles (4.0 km) east-northeast of Marlinton.
