= Camp Bartow Historic District =

Historic district in West Virginia, United States

- U.S. National Register of Historic Places
- U.S. Historic district
- Location within West Virginia Location within the United States
- Location: Jct. of U.S. Route 250 and WV 92 and WV 28, Bartow, West Virginia
- Coordinates: 38°32′3″N 79°46′4″W
- Area: 182 acres (74 ha)
- Built by: Peter D. Yeager, James Elliott
- NRHP reference No.: 95001325
- Added to NRHP: May 10, 1996

The Camp Bartow Historic District — centered on the historic inn called "Traveller's Repose" (1845, rebuilt 1869) and the site of the Battle of Greenbrier River (1861) — is a national historic district located at Bartow, Pocahontas County, West Virginia, United States. It is situated at the foot of Burner Mountain, at a bend in the East Fork Greenbrier River, where U.S. Route 28 intersects U.S. Route 250.

It was entered onto the National Register of Historic Places in 1996.

== The District ==
The District encompasses ten contributing buildings and nine contributing sites. The house known as "Traveller's Repose" was built in 1869, and is a two-story, side gabled residence. It was expanded in 1912, and in 1928. The property also includes a simple two-story, side gabled residence built in 1898, with a rear 1 1/2-story addition. Contributing outbuildings associated with the Repose include a barn (1925), well house (c. 1930), woodshed (c. 1930), cellar house (c. 1870 / 1912), corn crib (c. 1940), and storage building (c. 1920). Located nearby and also contributing are an unpainted barn (c. 1910) and garage (c. 1940). The property also includes the Yeager Cemetery.

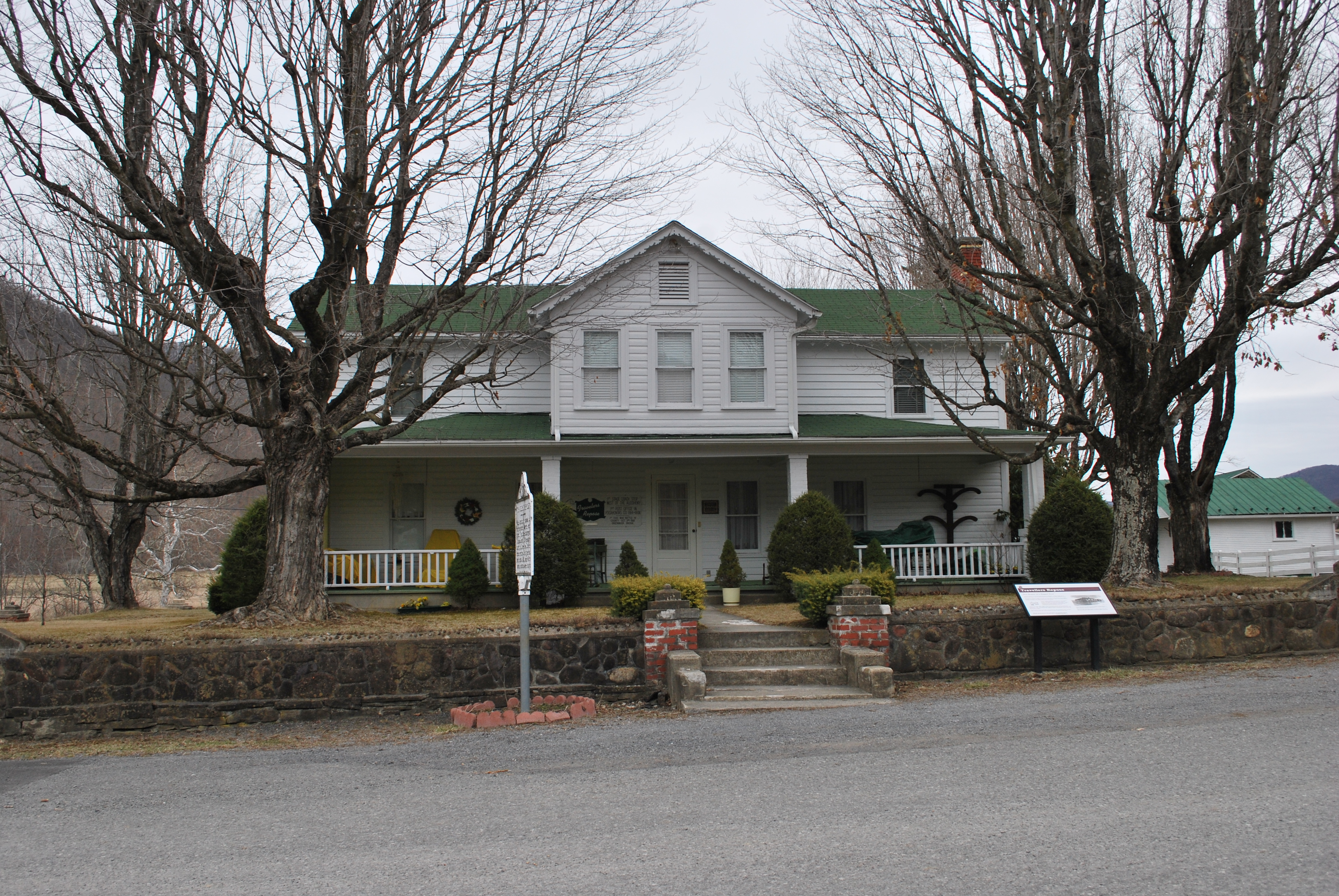
"Traveller's Repose" circa 2009

Sites associated with the American Civil War battle of October 3, 1861, known as the Battle of Greenbrier River, include four major fortifications, consisting of a series of trenches surrounding artillery emplacements. There are two additional artillery emplacements, camp / tent sites associated with Camp Bartow, and an unmarked Confederate Army cemetery containing 82 graves. Also included in the district is a section of the Staunton and Parkersburg Turnpike, constructed between 1838 and 1846.

== Traveller’s Repose ==
=== History ===
The historic inn known as "Traveller’s Repose" — or "Travelers’ Repose" — for many decades served patrons transiting the Staunton-Parkersburg Turnpike. It was once well known as the first stagecoach stop west of Allegheny Mountain. It was owned and managed from 1845 by Andrew Yeager (1800-1861), son of area pioneer John P. Yeager, Sr (1762-1833), an immigrant from near Lancaster City, Pennsylvania who had arrived in the area around 1795. The Repose served as Pocahontas county's first post office (1847-1906). The present two-story, wood-frame farmhouse dates to 1869.

The Repose owes its existence to construction of the historic turnpike, which began in 1838. By 1845, the turnpike having extended from Staunton to Weston, a traveler's inn had become an attractive proposition. The mail route through here was established in 1847, and when it did, Travelers’ Repose became the post office as well.

In September, 1861, a Confederate detachment encamped on the crest of Allegheny Mountain, just ten miles to the southeast. On October 3, the inn suffered crossfire during the Battle of Greenbrier River. Named Camp Bartow after the late Col. Francis S. Bartow (a Confederate commander who had died about 2 months before), the fortifications are still relatively intact. (The surrounding community would consequently be known as Bartow as well.) Later that winter, bushwhackers burned the Repose, thereby depriving both sides of its use. The Rebels, uncertain as to whether they could hold Camp Bartow in the event of another Union challenge, moved about 5 miles to the east to establish Camp Allegheny in an effort to retain control of the turnpike. On December 13, the Rebels repulsed a Union advance at this new position, thus ensuring that control of the turnpike would not be lost. But that advantage was secured at a significant cost: An unmarked grave on the property is said to contain the remains of more than 80 Confederate soldiers who died of their wounds, disease and exposure that winter.

In 1869, Peter Dilly Yeager (1829-1906), Andrew's son, who had spent a portion of the war in a Union prison, rebuilt Travelers’ Repose on the foundations of the earlier establishment. The refurbished lodge had 22 rooms, plus space for 28 horses in the barn. It was then variously known as the “Yeager Hotel” and the “Greenbrier Hotel”. The Repose was purchased by Brown Buren Beard (1883-1969) in 1912. (He was Peter's first cousin once removed.) His daughter, Jessie Beard Powell (1915-2013), a great-great-granddaughter of John Yeager, Sr, resided at the Repose for all of her 97 years and long kept alive stories of the old days. (One of them: that the 1,200 Rebel soldiers who invaded her family's farm exacted a cost of 500 of their sugar maples which were cut down for military purposes.)

Longstanding local lore asserts that Abraham Lincoln stayed here during his early journeys between Illinois and Washington, DC. Among the other notables who are said (mostly without documentation) to have lodged at the Repose are Stonewall Jackson.

The Repose was still supplying "lodging and meals" to travelers around 1940 when writers for the WPA visited the area.

In 2014, after Jessie Beard Powell had died, the property was auctioned and finally passed out of the family's hands.

=== In popular culture ===
- Celebrated writer Ambrose Bierce described the Repose in an autobiographical essay (“A Bivouac to the Dead”) in 1903. He had been a Union soldier here in 1861.
- Novelist Joseph Hergesheimer (1880–1954) wrote a short story (“Tol’able David”) set here in 1917; a play — and silent (1921) and talking (1930) movie versions — followed. In 1922, Hergesheimer described the Repose again in another Saturday Evening Post short story, itself entitled "Traveler's Repose". His fictionalized name for the Greenbrier River Valley is "Greenstream County".
