= Marlinton station =

- Marlinton Chesapeake and Ohio Railroad Station
- U.S. National Register of Historic Places
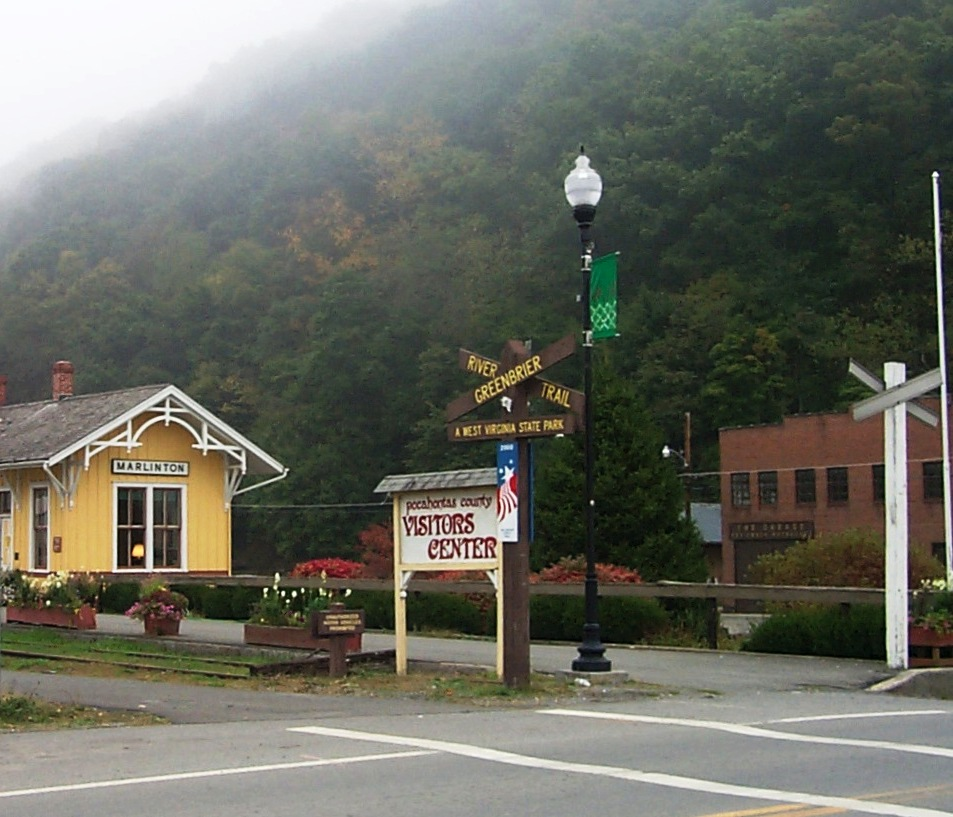
- Marlinton Chesapeake and Ohio Railroad Station, Fall 2004

- Location within West Virginia Location within the United States
- Location: 8th St. and 4th Ave., Marlinton, West Virginia
- Coordinates: 38°13′21″N 80°5′34″W
- Area: 1 acre (0.40 ha)
- Built: 1901
- NRHP reference No.: 79002598
- Added to NRHP: August 29, 1979

Marlinton Chesapeake and Ohio Railroad Station was a historic railway station and bunkhouse located at Marlinton, Pocahontas County, West Virginia. They were built in 1901 by the Chesapeake and Ohio Railway. The station was a frame, rectangular, one-story building measuring 76 feet by 16 feet and used for both passengers and freight. The bunkhouse is a one-story frame building measuring 24 feet by 16 feet. Both buildings featured vertical board and batten siding and decorative brackets in the wide projecting eaves of their gable roofs. Passenger service ended at Marlinton in 1958. Given its location at the trailhead of the Greenbrier River Trail, the station was renovated to house the Pocahontas County Convention and Visitors Bureau. The station was destroyed by fire in 2008; the bunkhouse remains extant.

It was listed on the National Register of Historic Places in 1979.

Preceding station	Chesapeake and Ohio Railway	Following station
Buckeye toward Ronceverte	Greenbrier Division	Clawson toward Durbin
