= Seneca State Forest =

State Forest Pocahontas County, West Virginia

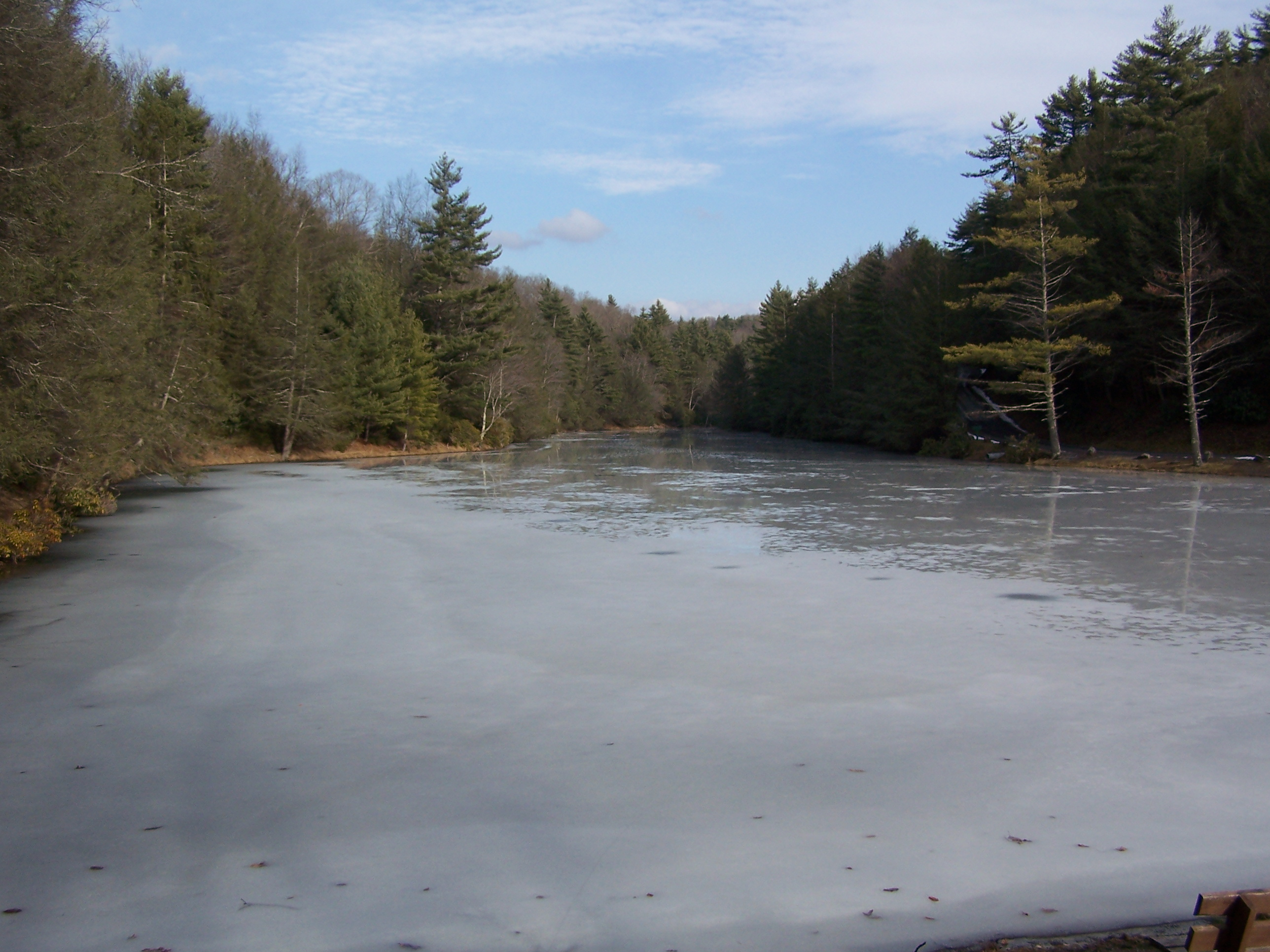
- Seneca Lake

- Location within West Virginia
- Location: Pocahontas, West Virginia, United States
- Coordinates: 38°19′39″N 79°56′08″W
- Area: 11,684 acres (47.28 km^{2})
- Elevation: 3,245 ft (989 m)
- Established: 1924
- Operator: West Virginia Division of Natural Resources and West Virginia Division of Forestry
- Website: wvstateparks.com/park/seneca-state-forest/
- New Deal Resources in Seneca State Forest Historic District
- U.S. National Register of Historic Places
- U.S. Historic district
- Location: Dunmore, West Virginia
- Built: 1933-1938
- NRHP reference No.: 100002854
- Added to NRHP: September 4. 2018

Seneca State Forest is a state forest located in Pocahontas County, West Virginia. Created in 1924, it is the oldest state forest in West Virginia. It is also West Virginia's second-largest state forest at 11,684 acres (47.28 km^{2}).

The West Virginia Division of Natural Resources rents eight fully equipped pioneer cabins. As of 2013, the Thorny Mountain Fire Tower is also being renovated and will be available for overnight rentals.

Public hunting and fishing are available in the forest. Visitors can boat on the 4-acre (0.016 km^{2}) Seneca Lake. The forest contains a section of the Allegheny Trail and other trails and is near the Greenbrier River Trail.

A Civilian Conservation Corps camp was once located near the current Seneca State Forest office. CCC-related resources in the forest were listed on the National Register of Historic Places in 2018.

The Allegheny Trail, WV's longest hiking trail, goes though 8 miles of this forest.
