= Stony Bottom, West Virginia =

Stony Bottom
- Unincorporated community
- Location within the state of West Virginia Stony Bottom (the United States)
- Coordinates: 38°21′51″N 79°57′44″W
- Country: United States
- State: West Virginia
- County: Pocahontas
- Time zone: UTC-5 (Eastern (EST))
  - Summer (DST): UTC-4 (EDT)
- GNIS feature ID: 1555720

Stony Bottom is an unincorporated community located in Pocahontas County, West Virginia, United States. In the early 19th century, the town was known as Seldom Seen. At some point, this was changed to Driftwood by loggers who would drift logs by on the Greenbrier River. By 1908, it took its present name because of all the stones and rocks present in the area. The town currently has seasonal residents, as well as full-time residents and a small church named Alexander Memorial Presbyterian Church. On Labor Day of every year, the small town accommodated hundreds of people for the annual Hunter Reunion, where local resident Homer Hunter invited the community to take part in traditional bluegrass music, food, and fellowship. The town is nestled between the Greenbrier River and the Greenbrier River Trail, suitable for biking, horseback riding, and more. Their Post Office has been closed.
