= Pocahontas County Opera House =

- Marlinton Opera House
- U.S. National Register of Historic Places
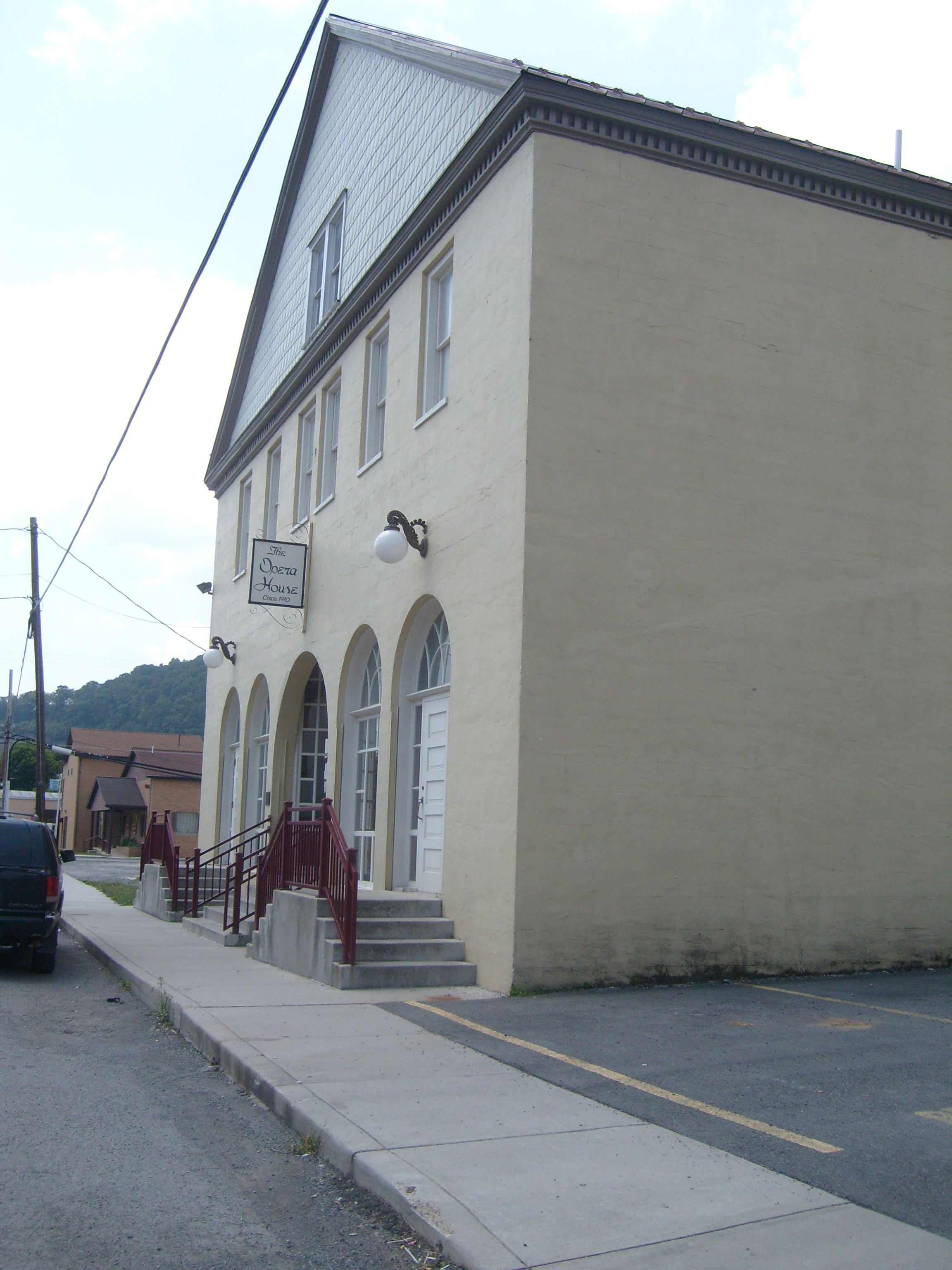
- Pocahontas County Opera House

- Location within West Virginia Location within the United States
- Location: Third Avenue, Marlinton, West Virginia
- Coordinates: 38°13′21″N 80°05′41″W
- Area: .125 acres (0.051 ha)
- Built: 1907
- NRHP reference No.: 00000253
- Added to NRHP: March 24, 2000

The Pocahontas County Opera House is located in rural Marlinton, West Virginia. Court reporter J.G. Tilton, of Mount Vernon, Ohio, built the original building in 1907. In 1910, the current building was added on. It currently serves as a performance venue for local and traveling performers as well as a community center for county residents, although it has at times been a newspaper, a roller rink, and a car dealership. The Pocahontas County Opera House Foundation operates as a non-profit to oversee programmatic aspects of the venue.

The Opera House also serves as a community center. Many organizations host suppers, meetings square dances, and even weddings at the facility. The Foundation also hosts music jams and movie nights for Pocahontas County, West Virginia residents.

== History ==
The Pocahontas Opera House was originally built in 1910 by lumber businessman and publisher of the Marlinton Messenger, J. G. Tilton. Marlinton was the epicenter of the regions lumber business at the time.

In the early twentieth century, groups from as far away as New York performed in this booming railroad town. In 1912, Tilton's newspaper, the Marlinton Messenger, was published in the Opera House. County fairs, basketball games, and other community events took place in the space as well. As the railroad economy changed, Tilton sold the building. Throughout the rest of the century it was used for various purposes such as a lumberyard and a car dealership.

In 1991, the Pocahontas County Historic Landmarks Commission bought the property. At that time, there was no floor or stage in the Opera House. Through community donations and support, the Commission restored the Opera House to its present state in 1998 when the Pocahontas County Opera House Foundation formed. The Foundation oversees the performance series which includes various musical genres from bluegrass to salsa to classical to jazz. The season also includes dance and theater.

The Opera House received a facelift in 2021, with patching of the mortar parging of the historic building and new exterior paint by a company specializing in such work on historic buildings.
