= Jacox, West Virginia =

- Unincorporated community
- Location within West Virginia Location within the United States
- Coordinates: 38°05′20″N 80°18′27″W
- Country: United States
- State: West Virginia
- County: Pocahontas
- Elevation: 2,572 ft (784 m)
- Time zone: UTC-5 (Eastern (EST))
  - Summer (DST): UTC-4 (EDT)
- Area codes: 304 & 681
- GNIS feature ID: 1551560

Jacox is an unincorporated community in Pocahontas County, West Virginia, United States. Jacox is 6 miles (9.7 km) southwest of Hillsboro.

The community was named the local Jacox family of pioneer settlers.
