= Pocahontas County Courthouse and Jail =

- U.S. National Register of Historic Places
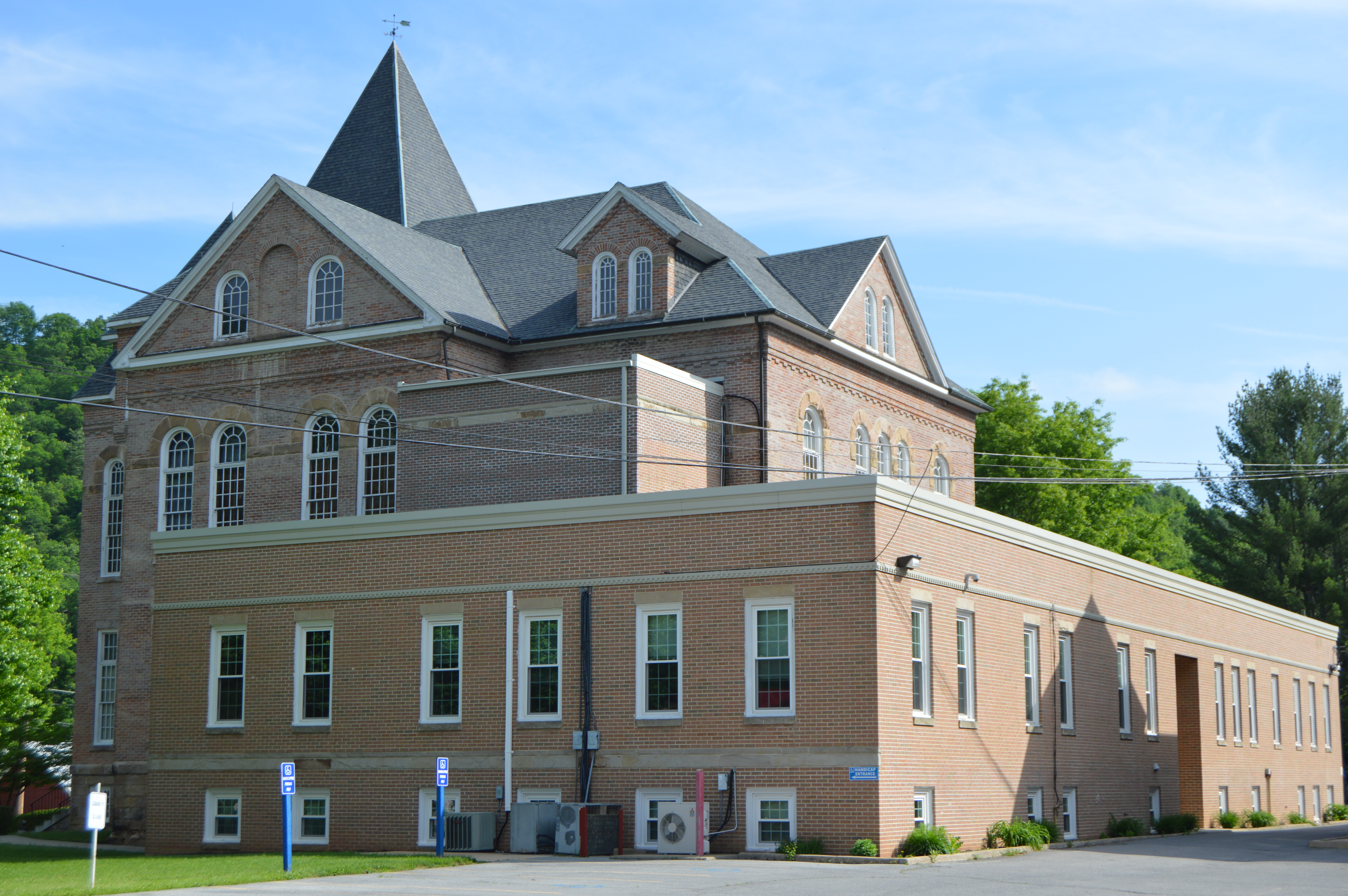
- Rear of the courthouse

- Location within West Virginia Location within the United States
- Interactive map showing the location of Pocahontas County Courthouse and Jail
- Location: 900C Tenth Ave., Marlinton, West Virginia
- Coordinates: 38°13′4″N 80°5′18″W
- Area: 1.7 acres (0.69 ha)
- Built: 1894
- Built by: Manley Manufacturing Company
- Architect: M.F. Giesey
- Architectural style: Romanesque
- NRHP reference No.: 94000724
- Added to NRHP: July 15, 1994

Pocahontas County Courthouse and Jail is a historic courthouse and jail located at Marlinton, Pocahontas County, West Virginia. The courthouse was built in 1894, and is a 2 1/2-story, brick, Victorian Romanesque building with a stone raised basement level. It has irregular massing with a central block that has a steep hip roof. The front elevation features two towers, one at each corner. A courthouse annex building was added in 1976. The jail is a two-story brick building in simple Romanesque Style. It was built at the same time as the courthouse as the jailer's residence. A brick two-story shallow hip roofed ell was added in 1926, to house the jail.

It was listed on the National Register of Historic Places in 1994.
