= Frank, West Virginia =

- Census-designated place (CDP)
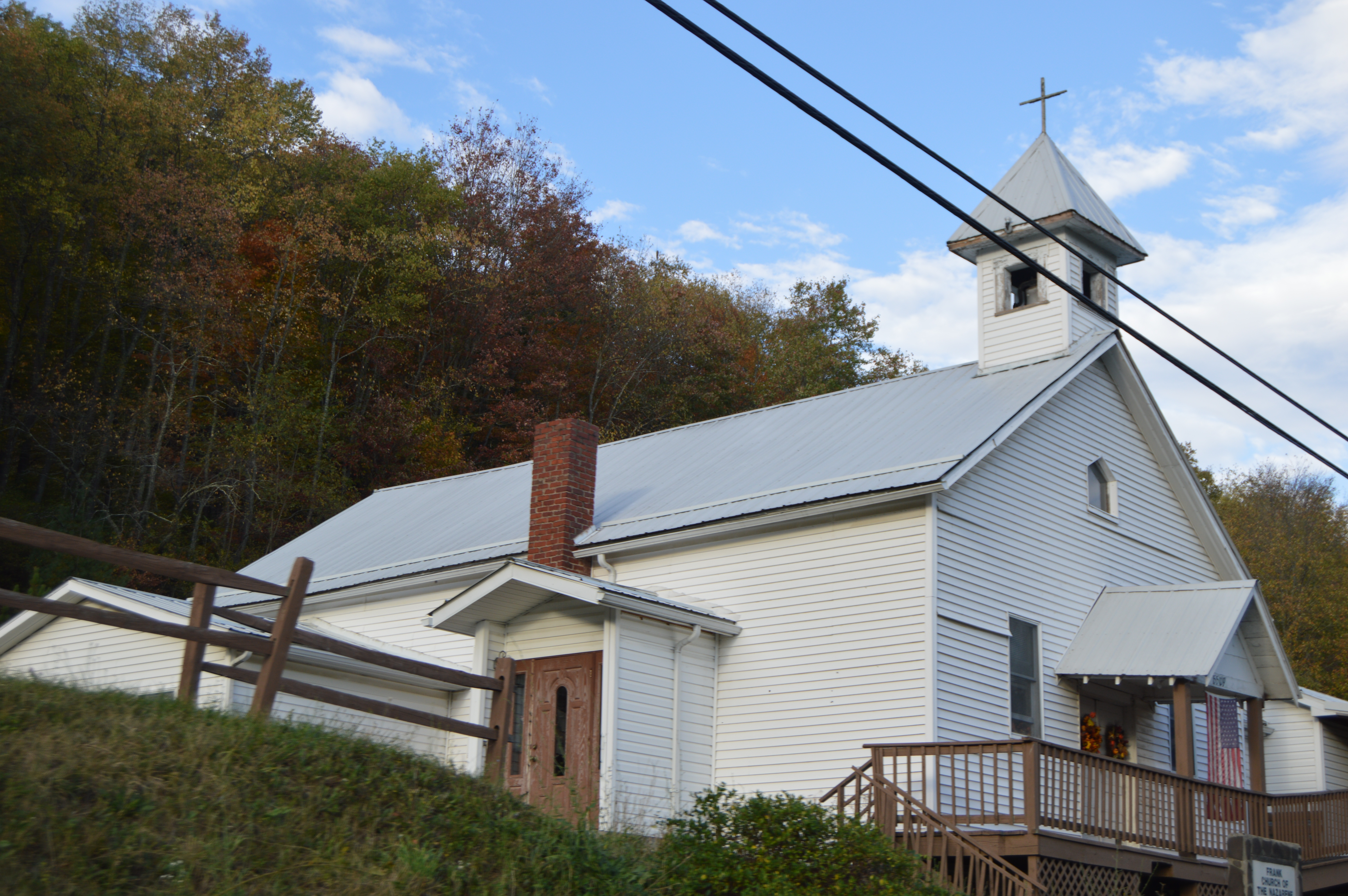
- Nazarene church

- Location within the state of West Virginia
- Coordinates: 38°32′54″N 79°48′20″W
- Country: United States
- State: West Virginia
- County: Pocahontas

Area
  - Total: 0.383 sq mi (0.99 km^{2})
  - Land: 0.383 sq mi (0.99 km^{2})
  - Water: 0 sq mi (0 km^{2})

Population (2020)
  - Total: 79
  - Density: 210/sq mi (80/km^{2})
- Time zone: UTC-5 (Eastern (EST))
  - Summer (DST): UTC-4 (EDT)

Frank is a census-designated place (CDP) in Pocahontas County, West Virginia, United States. The population was 79 at the 2020 census (down from 90 at the 2010 census). It was named to honor Frank Hoffman in 1926. Hoffman was the proprietor of a local tannery.

The unemployment rate in Frank is 6.2% (U.S. avg. is 3.9%). Compared to the rest of the country, Frank's cost of living is 28.8% lower than the U.S. average.
