= Huntersville Old County Jail =

Historic building in West Virginia, US

- U.S. National Register of Historic Places
- Location within West Virginia Location within the United States
- Location: Barlow Lane Road, Huntersville, West Virginia 24954, US
- Coordinates: 38°11′26″N 80°01′02″W
- Built: 1882
- Architectural style: Italianate architecture
- NRHP reference No.: 100008823
- Added to NRHP: April 26, 2023

The Huntersville Old County Jail and the adjacent Old Clerk's Office are two historic structures located in a large grassy field in the rural community of Huntersville, Pocahontas County, West Virginia. The site once housed the original Pocahontas County Courthouse, and these two buildings are the last surviving remnants of the county's first seat of government.

The Old Clerk's Office is a modest, shed-like structure constructed of brick and wood, though its exact construction date is unknown. The jail, built in the early 1880s, is a substantial stone building designed in the Italianate style. It contains four cells, with secure iron doors and barred windows intended to prevent escape.

It was listed on the National Register of Historic Places in 2023.
