= Frank and Anna Hunter House =

Historic house in West Virginia, United States

- U.S. National Register of Historic Places
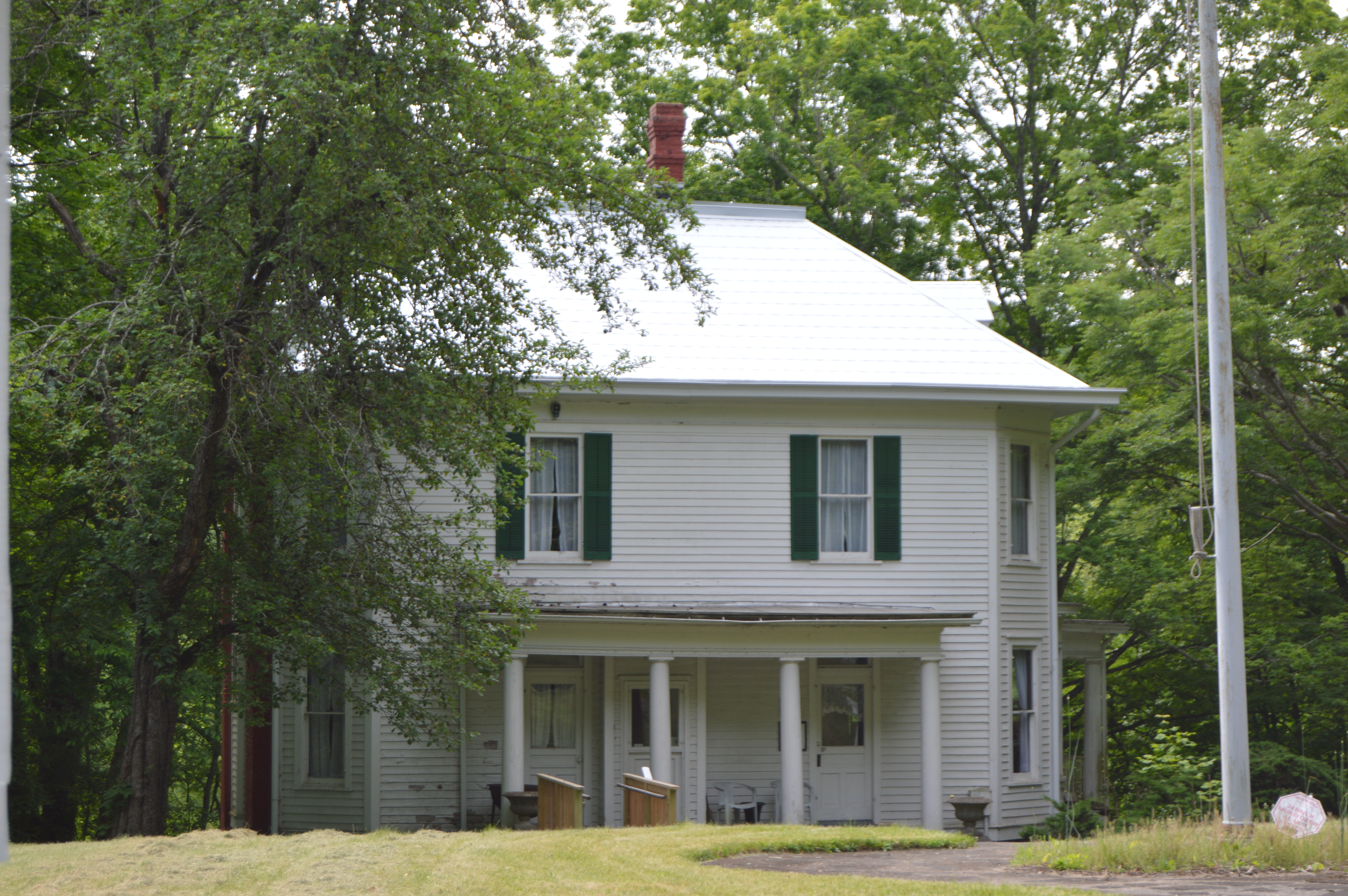
- Front of the house

- Location within West Virginia Location within the United States
- Location: U.S. 219, Marlinton, West Virginia
- Coordinates: 38°13′14″N 80°6′3″W
- Area: 5 acres (2.0 ha)
- Built: 1903
- NRHP reference No.: 76001945
- Added to NRHP: May 13, 1976

Frank and Anna Hunter House, also known as Pocohontas County Museum, is a historic home located at Marlinton, Pocahontas County, West Virginia. It was built in 1903, and is a two-story, square frame dwelling. The house has a hipped roof with dormers and crowned with a captain's walk. The front elevation features Victorian-Gothic "icing" ornamentation. Also on the property is a log cabin built about 1850 and moved to the property from nearby Beards Mountain. The Pocohontas County Historical Society purchased the property for use as a museum in 1963.

It was listed on the National Register of Historic Places in 1976.
