= Burner Mountain =

Summit in West Virginia, U.S.

Coordinates: 38.5590°N 79.8069°W

Burner Mountain is a summit in West Virginia, in the United States. With an elevation of 4,295 feet (1,309 m), it is the 56th highest summit in the state of West Virginia.

Burner Mountain most likely was named after Abraham Burner, a local pioneer settler. The Camp Bartow Historic District, and celebrated inn "Travellers' Repose", are at the foot of the mountain.
