= Violet, West Virginia =

- Unincorporated community
- Location within West Virginia Location within the United States
- Coordinates: 38°09′25″N 80°08′31″W
- Country: United States
- State: West Virginia
- County: Pocahontas
- Elevation: 2,087 ft (636 m)
- Time zone: UTC-5 (Eastern (EST))
  - Summer (DST): UTC-4 (EDT)
- Area codes: 304 & 681
- GNIS feature ID: 1555894

Violet is an unincorporated community in Pocahontas County, West Virginia, United States. It is located on the Greenbrier River, 4 miles (6.4 km) east-northeast of Hillsboro.
