= McNeel Mill =

- U.S. National Register of Historic Places
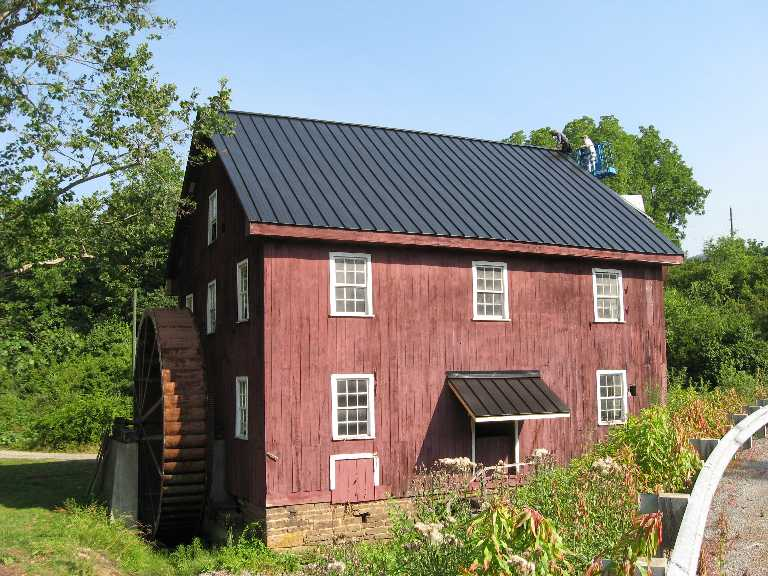
- McNeel Mill, July 2008

- Location within West Virginia Location within the United States
- Location: US 219, Mill Point, West Virginia
- Coordinates: 38°9′26″N 80°10′55″W
- Area: 1.5 acres (0.61 ha)
- Architect: McNeel, Isaac
- NRHP reference No.: 85001783
- Added to NRHP: August 8, 1985

The McNeel Mill is located just south of the intersection of route 219 and route 39 and route 55 in Mill Point, Pocahontas County, West Virginia (2 miles north of Hillsboro, West Virginia). The mill was completed in 1868 by Isaac McNeel and was in operation until 1947. The three-story wood-frame mill operated with a 21-foot (6.4 m) diameter metal mill wheel.

The present mill is the most recent of a series of mills that have stood on the site since 1778.

Recently the Pocahontas County Historical Society, The Pocahontas County Historic Landmarks Commission, West Virginia Division of Culture and History, The West Virginia State Historic Preservation Office, The Snowshoe Foundation and private individuals have made donations in order to preserve the current building and return it to working order for demonstration purposes.

The property was listed on the National Register of Historic Places on August 8, 1985.
