= IOOF Lodge Building (Marlinton, West Virginia) =

- U.S. National Register of Historic Places
- Location within West Virginia Location within the United States
- Location: Jct. of 8th St. and Second Ave., Marlinton, West Virginia
- Coordinates: 38°16′40″N 80°5′38″W
- Area: 0.2 acres (0.081 ha)
- Built: 1905
- Architect: Yeager, Brown McLauren
- Architectural style: Italianate
- NRHP reference No.: 00000249
- Added to NRHP: March 24, 2000

IOOF Lodge Building, also known as the Peacock Building, is a historic building located at Marlinton, Pocahontas County, West Virginia. It was built in 1905, and is a two-story, rectangular frame Italianate style commercial building. It measures approximately 106 feet by 56 feet. The first floor has two storefronts and the second floor has the Independent Order of Odd Fellows Lodge 102 / Modern Woodmen of America (Pocahontas Marlinton Camp No. 5992) meeting hall. The lodges continued to use the building until it was sold in 1999.

It was listed on the National Register of Historic Places in 2000.
