= Bartow, West Virginia =

Census-designated place in West Virginia, United States

- Census-designated place (CDP)
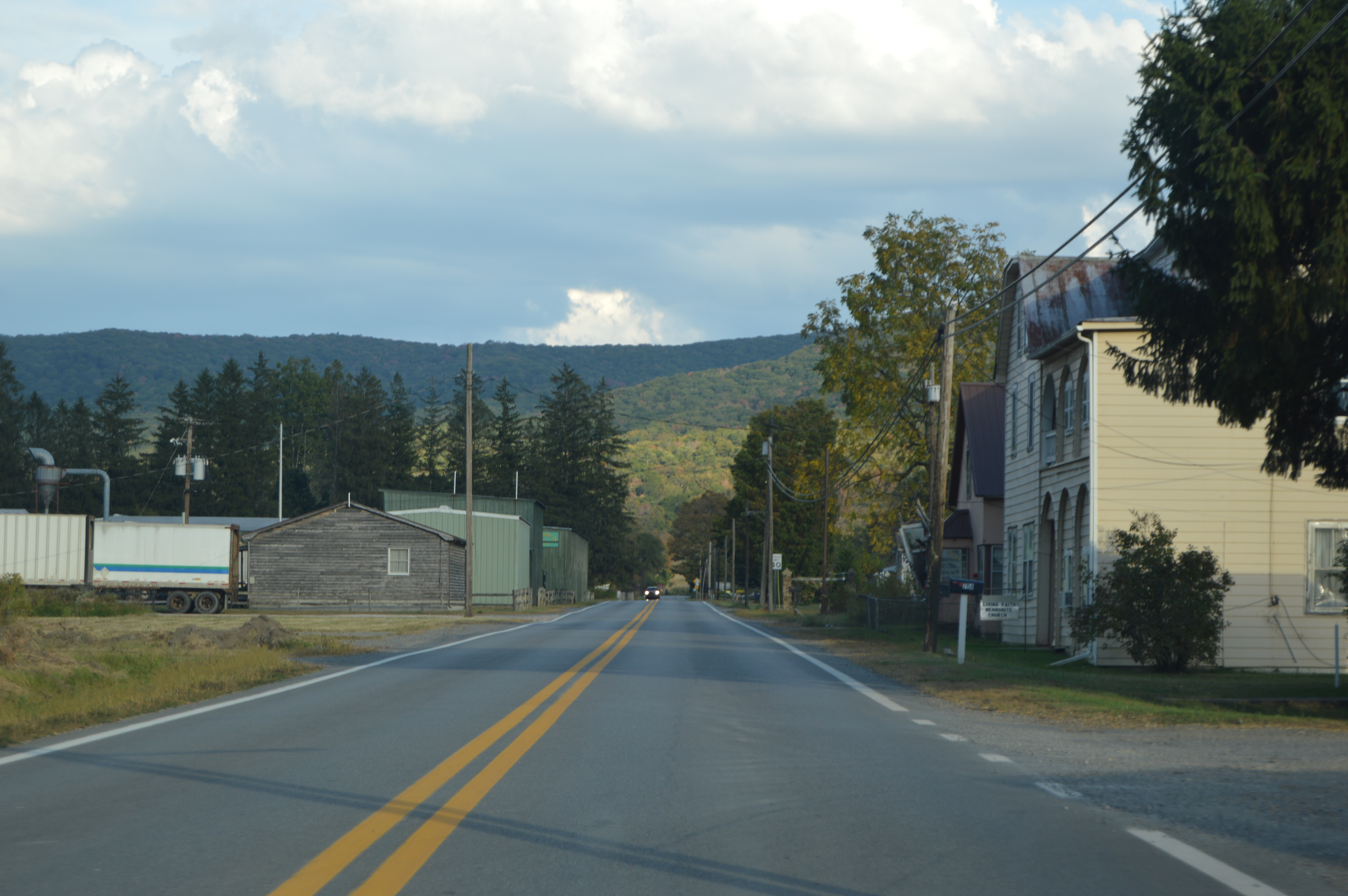
- U.S. Route 250

- Location within West Virginia
- Coordinates: 38°32′28″N 79°47′03″W
- Country: United States
- State: West Virginia
- County: Pocahontas

Area
  - Total: 0.464 sq mi (1.20 km^{2})
  - Land: 0.464 sq mi (1.20 km^{2})
  - Water: 0 sq mi (0 km^{2})
- Elevation: 2,769 ft (844 m)

Population (2020)
  - Total: 64
  - Density: 140/sq mi (53/km^{2})
- Time zone: UTC-5 (Eastern (EST))
  - Summer (DST): UTC-4 (EDT)
- ZIP code: 24920
- Area codes: 304 & 681
- GNIS feature ID: 1550176

Bartow is a census-designated place (CDP) in Pocahontas County, West Virginia, United States. The population was 64 at the 2020 census (down from 111 at the 2010 census).

Bartow is situated along U.S. Route 250 and West Virginia Route 92 and on the East Fork Greenbrier River, approximately 2 miles (3.2 km) east of Durbin. It has a post office with ZIP code 24920.

Bartow is named for Col. Francis S. Bartow, a Confederate commander who died at the Battle of First Manassas on July 21, 1861. The Battle of Greenbrier River, also known as the Battle of Camp Bartow, took place on October 3, 1861, about one mile (1.6 km) southeast of the present town.

The Camp Bartow Historic District was listed on the National Register of Historic Places in 1995. Located near Bartow is the Camp Allegheny Historic District, listed in 1990.

== Climate ==
Climate data for Bartow 1S, West Virginia, 1991–2020 normals, 1944-2020 extremes: 3025ft (922m)
Month	Jan	Feb	Mar	Apr	May	Jun	Jul	Aug	Sep	Oct	Nov	Dec	Year
Record high °F (°C)	69 (21)	71 (22)	81 (27)	86 (30)	91 (33)	89 (32)	92 (33)	93 (34)	88 (31)	86 (30)	78 (26)	72 (22)	93 (34)
Mean maximum °F (°C)	57.6 (14.2)	60.7 (15.9)	69.9 (21.1)	79.1 (26.2)	82.9 (28.3)	84.0 (28.9)	85.4 (29.7)	84.3 (29.1)	82.0 (27.8)	76.9 (24.9)	68.8 (20.4)	57.9 (14.4)	87.0 (30.6)
Mean daily maximum °F (°C)	35.0 (1.7)	38.8 (3.8)	47.1 (8.4)	59.7 (15.4)	68.1 (20.1)	74.2 (23.4)	77.4 (25.2)	76.4 (24.7)	70.9 (21.6)	61.1 (16.2)	48.9 (9.4)	39.0 (3.9)	58.1 (14.5)
Daily mean °F (°C)	26.2 (−3.2)	29.0 (−1.7)	36.3 (2.4)	47.4 (8.6)	56.4 (13.6)	63.5 (17.5)	66.9 (19.4)	65.7 (18.7)	59.6 (15.3)	49.2 (9.6)	38.4 (3.6)	30.4 (−0.9)	47.4 (8.6)
Mean daily minimum °F (°C)	17.4 (−8.1)	19.2 (−7.1)	25.6 (−3.6)	35.1 (1.7)	44.7 (7.1)	52.8 (11.6)	56.4 (13.6)	55.0 (12.8)	48.3 (9.1)	37.2 (2.9)	27.8 (−2.3)	21.8 (−5.7)	36.8 (2.7)
Mean minimum °F (°C)	−4.3 (−20.2)	−0.5 (−18.1)	7.1 (−13.8)	21.0 (−6.1)	29.2 (−1.6)	38.8 (3.8)	45.6 (7.6)	44.3 (6.8)	34.3 (1.3)	23.4 (−4.8)	12.8 (−10.7)	3.6 (−15.8)	−6.6 (−21.4)
Record low °F (°C)	−30 (−34)	−23 (−31)	−11 (−24)	11 (−12)	20 (−7)	28 (−2)	35 (2)	32 (0)	18 (−8)	11 (−12)	−2 (−19)	−20 (−29)	−30 (−34)
Average precipitation inches (mm)	3.42 (87)	2.99 (76)	4.09 (104)	3.81 (97)	4.87 (124)	3.94 (100)	4.10 (104)	3.62 (92)	3.49 (89)	2.86 (73)	2.92 (74)	3.67 (93)	43.78 (1,113)
Average snowfall inches (cm)	16.00 (40.6)	17.20 (43.7)	13.90 (35.3)	2.50 (6.4)	0.10 (0.25)	0.00 (0.00)	0.00 (0.00)	0.00 (0.00)	0.00 (0.00)	0.60 (1.5)	4.30 (10.9)	12.80 (32.5)	67.4 (171.15)
Source 1: NOAA
Source 2: XMACIS (temp records & monthly max/mins)
