= Francis S. Bartow =

American politician (1816–1861)

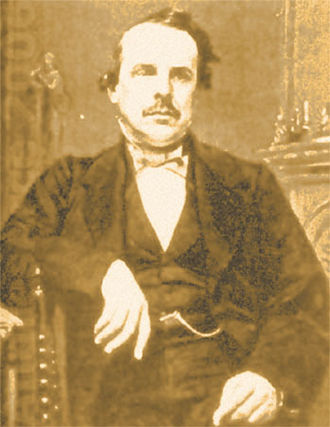
- Bartow c. 1860

Personal details
- Born: Francis Stebbins Bartow; September 6, 1816 Chatham County, Georgia, U.S.
- Died: July 21, 1861 (aged 44) Manassas, Virginia
- Resting place: Laurel Grove Cemetery, Savannah, Georgia
- Spouse: Louisa Greene Berrien (m. 1844)
- Education: Franklin College; Yale Law School

Military service
- Allegiance: Confederate States
- Branch/service: Confederate States Army
- Years of service: 1861
- Rank: Colonel; Acting Brigadier General
- Battles/wars: American Civil War: First Battle of Manassas †

Francis Stebbins Bartow (September 6, 1816 – July 21, 1861) was an American lawyer and politician from Georgia. He served two terms in the United States House of Representatives and became a politician in the Confederate States of America. Bartow was also a colonel in the Georgia Militia commanding the 21st Oglethorpe Light Infantry during the early months of the American Civil War. Bartow was a delegate from Georgia's 1st congressional district to the Southern Convention in Montgomery, Alabama becoming an inaugurating member of the Confederate Provisional Congress—leading efforts to prepare local forces in the aftermath of secession, protracting into The American Civil War of 1861–65.

Bartow was killed at the First Battle of Manassas, becoming the first brigade commander of the Confederate States Army to die in combat.

== Early life and career ==
Francis Stebbins Bartow was born September 6, 1816, in Chatham County, Georgia, near the county seat of Savannah (formerly Georgia's state capital), to Dr. Theodosius Bartow and Frances Lloyd (Stebbins) Bartow. He studied law at the Franklin College of Arts and Sciences in Athens (the founding college of the University of Georgia). While at Franklin, Bartow was a member of the Phi Kappa Literary Society and was mentored by John M. Berrien, a U.S. senator and former Attorney General in Andrew Jackson's administration. Bartow graduated cum laude in 1835 at age 19. Bartow was an intern under the tutelage of Messrs. Berrien & Law at their Savannah law office. Bartow obtained his postgraduate education at Yale Law School in Connecticut, returning to Savannah in 1837. Bartow was subsequently employed by the Bryan Superior Court and admitted to the State Bar of Georgia soon after his return to Savannah. He joined the locally known law firm of Law & Lovell, becoming a partner and forming Law, Bartow and Lovell.

In 1840, the 24-year-old Bartow campaigned for William Henry Harrison, the Whig candidate for President. In 1841, he began his own political career by serving the first of two consecutive terms in the Georgia House of Representatives, followed by one term in the Georgia Senate. In 1844, Bartow married Louisa Greene Berrien, the daughter of one of his previous professional tutors, Sen. John Berrien. In 1856, Bartow was a candidate for the U.S. Congress but was defeated. The following year, he was elected as captain of Savannah's 21st Oglethorpe Light Infantry, a reserve guard company that had been formed in 1856. He served as an instructor to the volunteers, many of which were young scions of established families in local society.

As the national controversy over slavery intensified, Bartow became concerned for Georgia's destiny if war became a reality. He was one of the largest slaveholders in the state. By 1860, he owned a total of 89 slaves, most of whom lived and worked at his plantation on the Savannah River in Chatham County. In 1860, after Abraham Lincoln's election, he spurned the Union to advocate the right of secession.

== American Civil War ==
=== Secession and Fort Pulaski ===
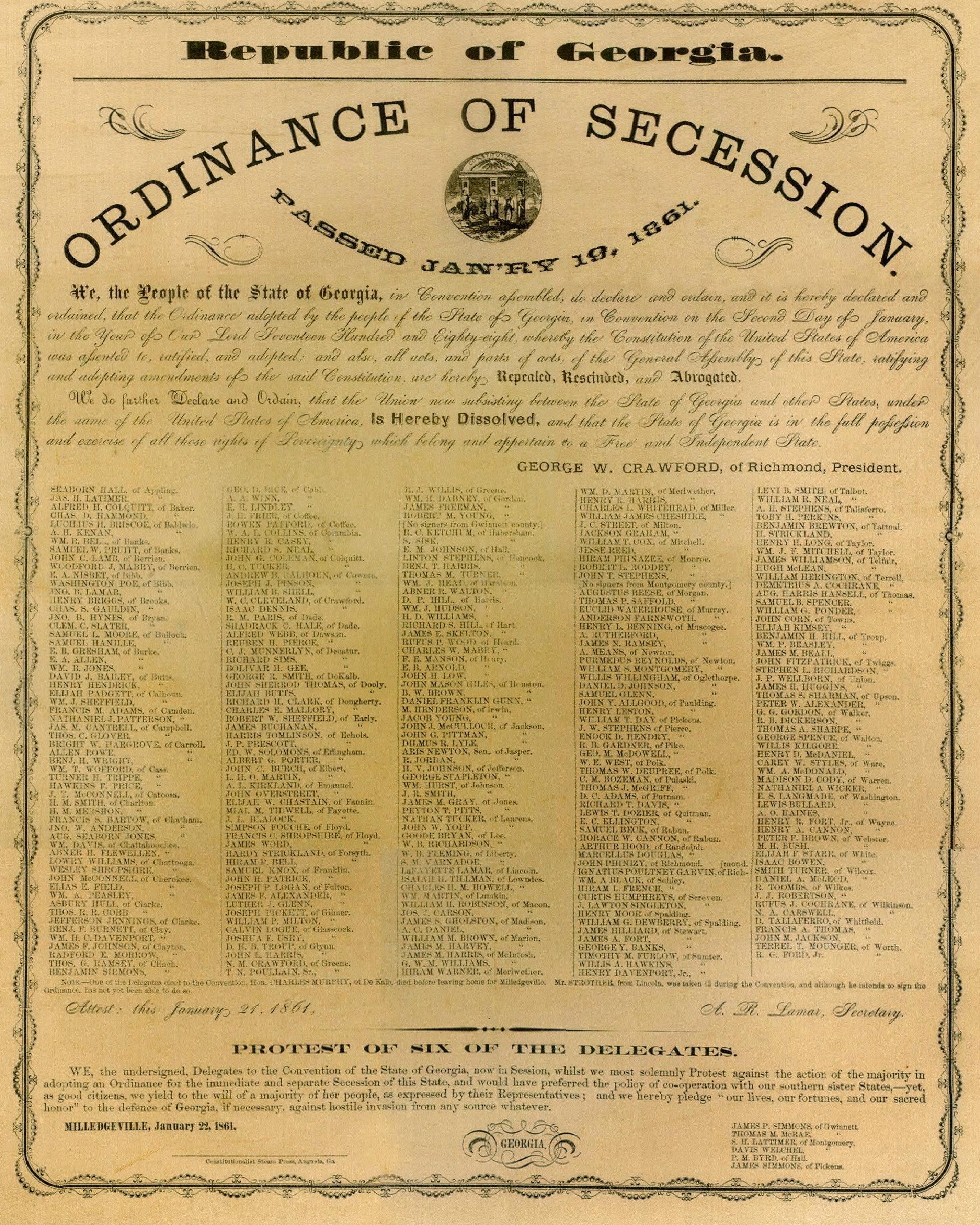
Facsimile of the 1861 Ordinance of Secession signed by Bartow and 292 other delegates to the Georgia Secession Convention at the statehouse in Milledgeville, Georgia January 21, 1861.

The Georgia General Assembly summoned delegates to a Secession Convention in Milledgeville which began January 16, 1861—with Bartow nominated for Chatham County's delegation. On May 28, 1861, elections were held to select representatives to the convention, and Bartow emerged as a delegate, along with John W. Anderson and A. S. Jones. Bartow however, was on military duty that day as Governor Joseph E. Brown had previously given orders to retake Fort Pulaski (located near the mouth of the Savannah River)—recently garrisoned by Federal military forces. Brown entrusted the task to Bartow and the Oglethorpe Light Infantry. Bartow's expedition successfully occupied the fort on June 15, largely due to his artillery under Col. Alexander Lawton.

At the convention, Bartow stood out as one of the most fervent secessionists. Demanding an immediate withdrawal from the Union, he helped align Georgia among the pro-secessionist states. On January 19, 1861, delegates voted to secede from the Union by a vote of 208 to 89. Bartow was a delegate in favor of secession, voting to sign Georgia's Ordinance of Secession on that day. The actual signing of the ordinance occurred on January 21, 1861, when the delegates ceremoniously signed the document in the public square outside of the state capitol in Milledgeville. Bartow was subsequently chosen to represent Georgia in the Provisional Congress of the Confederate States at Montgomery, Alabama, starting February 4, 1861.

On the second day of the Congress, Bartow became chairman of the Military Committee. He helped select the color and style of the initial Confederate gray uniforms. During a later session, Bartow announced that he would depart for the battlefront, taking his Oglethorpe Light Infantry up to Virginia. As he explained later on:

After my public compelling to achieve it ... I had pledged myself to meet all the consequences of secession. I am bound, therefore, in honor, and still more strongly by duty, to be among the foremost in accepting the bloody consequences which seem to threaten us." Therefore, he resigned from Congress in May to join the Confederate army.

=== Dispute with Governor Brown ===
Bartow telegraphed the news to his Georgia troops, arranging a prompt rally. However, his plans were blocked by Governor Brown, who had already decided to concentrate the state's armed forces strictly for the defense of Georgia. Bartow appealed personally to the Confederate President, Jefferson Davis, using a new law authored by Louis T. Wigfall of Texas that authorized any citizen to offer any voluntary military force directly, without state mediation, to the Confederate President, who would also determine its military leader. Davis immediately approved Bartow's plan and designated him the commander of the new Confederate force, making Bartow's Oglethorpe Light Infantry the first company to officially contribute its services to the Confederacy's national war effort.

An angry Governor Brown countered by publishing an aggressively tough letter in all Georgia newspapers on May 21, 1861. Among other things, he alleged that Bartow was seeking his own glory by assuring a high command and aspiring to a promotion to colonel. To him, Bartow was actually deserting the war "to serve the common cause in a more pleasant summer climate." He wrote that the muskets Bartow's men had carried to Virginia were exclusively for local "public service," and that the Governor had the power of disarming the local military companies arbitrarily. He also alleged that Bartow had written the law beforehand, tailoring it for his own plans and forcing Davis to ignore the authority of the Confederacy's "independent" states. In Brown's opinion, the governor was Bartow's unique officer by the Confederate Constitution. He argued that the Congress was encroaching Georgia's rights.

Nonetheless, Bartow arrived in Savannah on May 21 to assemble his 106 soldiers and to arrange for a train to take them to Virginia's battlefront. A great rally of cheerful citizens congregated at the station, accompanied by the remaining local militia, which fired an artillery salute in Bartow's honor. Before departing, Bartow pronounced to the crowd his most celebrated phrase: "I go to illustrate Georgia."

On June 14, from Camp Defiance in Harper's Ferry, Bartow wrote his response to the "insolent missive" of Brown, who "thought proper to publish [it] in [Bartow's] absence". The response was published in the Savannah Morning News. Bartow defended himself vehemently, countering each of the personalized attacks and stating that he had undertaken the current campaign under the sole command of Jefferson Davis. His recurring argument was that the "Confederate Government is alone chargeable with questions of peace and war and has the exclusive right, excepting in the case of invasion, to raise and maintain armies" while the Governors are not "empowered to raise these armies". Brown would have been committing, "here again, [his] common error, of supposing that [he was] the State of Georgia .... a mistake in which I do not participate."

=== Manassas ===
Bartow's 21st Oglethorpe Light Infantry finally arrived in Richmond, Virginia, with the objective of protecting the region from any Union attack. On June 1, 1861, Bartow was promoted to Colonel of the 8th Georgia Infantry, which had been formed in Virginia from companies that had been arriving from different Georgia counties. Later that day, he mustered the regiment for the first time at Camp Bartow in Howard's Grove in Richmond. The regiment was initially assigned to the Shenandoah Valley. Crossing the Virginia Piedmont, it arrived in Winchester, near the northern end of the valley. Once settled, Bartow incorporated some local forces from the 2nd Brigade of the Army of the Shenandoah.

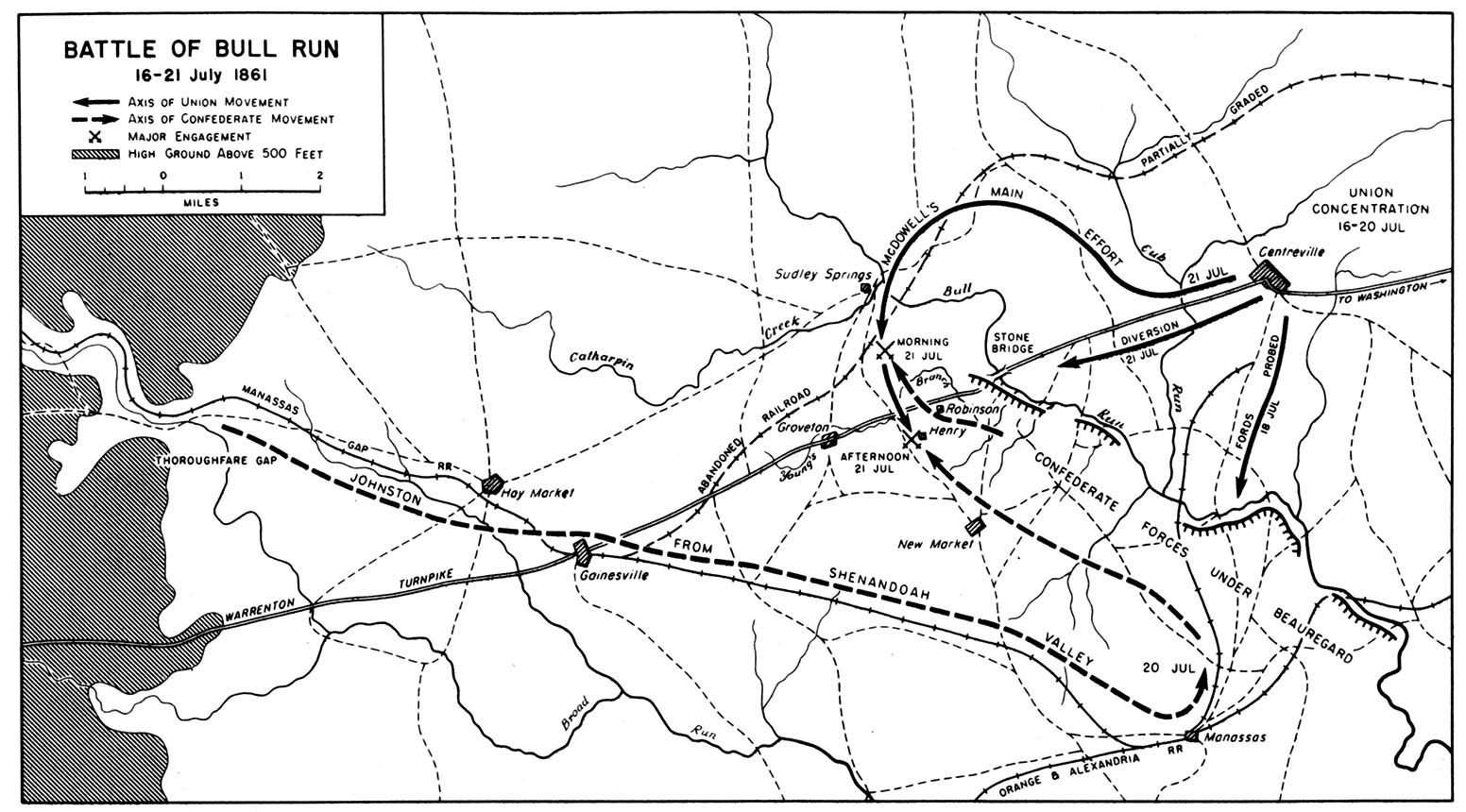
Map of the events of the battle

Late in June 1861, Bartow received orders to move his troops to the outskirts of Manassas to support General P. G. T. Beauregard. They departed on June 19, fording the Shenandoah River with their "luggage tied on the ends of [their] fixed bayonets." After reaching the Piedmont station, the regiment was transported to Manassas by train.

Bartow commanded the 7th & 8th Georgia Regiments—the 9th Georgia Regiment, Pope's and Duncan's Kentucky Battalions Infantry remained at Piedmont Station and were not present on July 21, 1861. He addressed his troops, "... but remember, boys, that battle and fighting mean death, and probably before sunrise, some of us will be dead." Early the next morning, Bartow had the 7th and 8th Georgia march to the left flank of the army.

After the fighting had started, the two regiments reached Henry House Hill, where they were joined by Bartow, after one of his soldiers confirmed that it was his regiment: "Boys, what Regiment is this?" The response came, "8th Georgia." He answered, "My God, boys, I am mighty glad to see you." He deployed his brigade on the hill alongside Brigadier-General Barnard Bee's brigade. Bee then decided to go forward to support Evan's brigade on Matthew Hill as Evans had rejected his suggestion to fall back to Henry Hill. Bartow deployed the 7th and 8th Georgia into line of battle to support the right flank of Bee's Brigade.

As the hours went on, Bartow's soldiers were gradually worn down by the enemy. At times, they found themselves completely encircled, the target of a spate of bullets. One of the survivors later wrote, "Practically half of the Eighth's 1,000 Georgians fell dead or wounded, or were captured or lost ... Bartow led his men to an exposed eminence which was too hot to hold."

Bartow (now with less than 400 men) was forced to retreat about noontime back to his original deployment site. There, he asked General Beauregard, "What shall now be done? Tell me, and if human efforts can avail, I will do it." Waving at the enemy position on the Stone Bridge, Beauregard replied, "That battery should be silenced." Bartow gathered the remainder of the 7th Regiment and launched another attack. Around Henry House Hill, Bartow's horse was shot out from under him and a bullet wounded him slightly. Nonetheless, he grabbed another horse and continued the attack.

At one point, he harangued his troops to follow him toward the enemy by cheering "Boys, follow me!" and waving his cap frantically over his head. Just then, another projectile perforated his chest, fatally lodging in his heart. Some of his soldiers gathered around him, witnessing his last words: "Boys, they have killed me, but never give up the field." Lying on the ground and wrapped in Col. Lucius Gartrell's arms, Francis Bartow died. He was the first brigade commander to be killed in action during the Civil War. (The first general officer to be killed in the war was Confederate Brig. Gen. Robert S. Garnett at Corrick's Ford, July 13, 1861.) Amos Rucker and his brother Moses Bentley, two body servants from the 7th Regiment, carried Bartow off the battlefield. The renowned surgeon H. V. M. Miller attended him, but without success.

The rest of Bartow's 7th Georgia continued to obey his last command to attack. The Union forces were beginning to show fatigue, due to their having been weakened during Bartow's morning attack. The Confederates sustained their attack until finally destroying the enemy battery at Stone Bridge. General Beauregard declared, "You Georgians saved me," though the Georgia Rome Weekly Courier newspaper commented, "Col. Bartow's fine Regiment of Georgians were nearly annihilated".

When notified of Bartow's death, the Provisional Congress adjourned its sessions "in testimony of [its] respect for his memory", as expressed by its spokesman, T. R. R. Cobb. The chamber felt an "unfeigned sorrow" due to the "heavy loss sustained by the Confederacy in the death of one of her most efficient counselors." They did confirm Bartow's posthumous rank of acting brigadier general.

On July 27, 1861, Bartow's corpse returned to Chatham County, Georgia. Accompanied by an extensive popular rally, Bartow was buried at Laurel Grove Cemetery with a military ceremony. Louisa Berrien received a consoling letter from Mrs. Jefferson Davis. His granite monument has two of his historical phrases engraved under a wreath and a saber: "I go to illustrate Georgia" and "They have killed me, boys, but never give up."

== Memorialization ==
=== Manassas battlefield ===
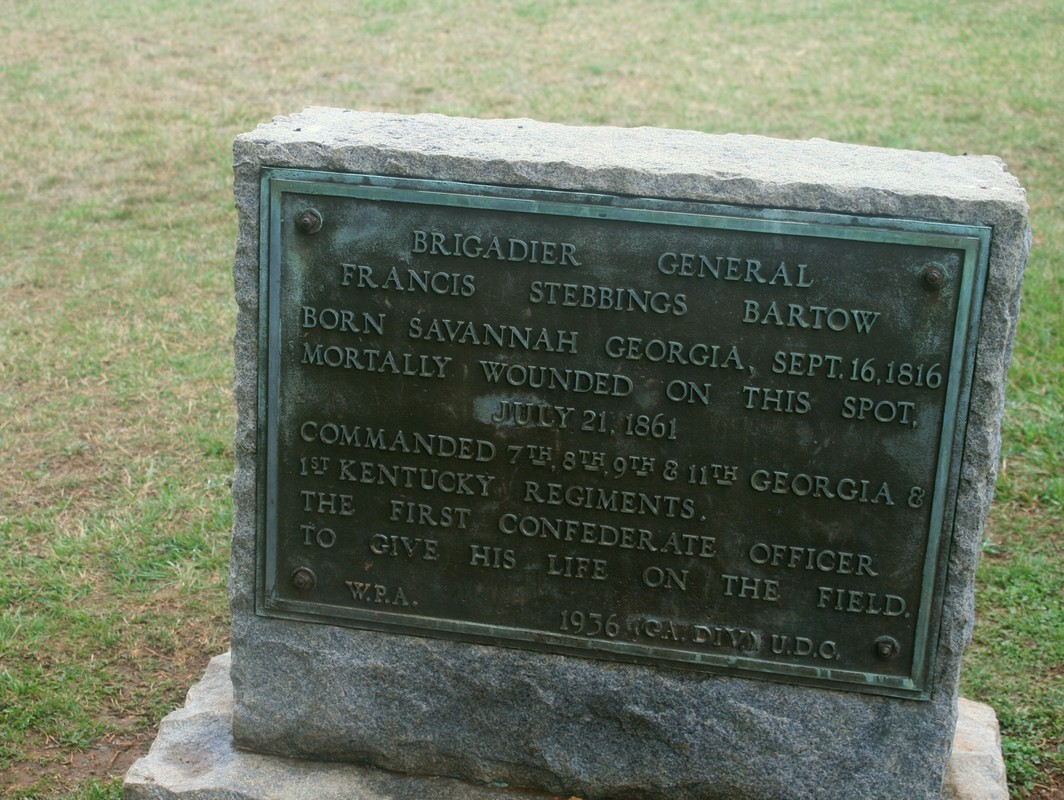
Marker of 1936

After the battle, on the approximate spot where Bartow was killed, Confederate soldiers placed a small stone landmark (engraved in Savannah) which quoted his last words: "My God, boys, they have got me, but never give up the field." This memorial stone was later removed by Union forces during one of their raids. (Two markers survive on that same site in the present-day National Battlefield—an older one placed by veterans of the 7th Georgia in 1903, and a newer bronze marker erected in the 20th century.)

On September 4, 1861, before a crowd of 1,000 people, the first Confederate-dedicated monument was inaugurated at Manassas, honoring Francis Bartow. An obelisk made of marble, it was mysteriously stolen in 1862. In 1936, in an attempt to repair this vandalism, a new marker was placed at the same site by the Georgia Division of the United Daughters of the Confederacy. A new monument of Bartow exists nearby, several feet from the original one.

=== Savannah's monument ===
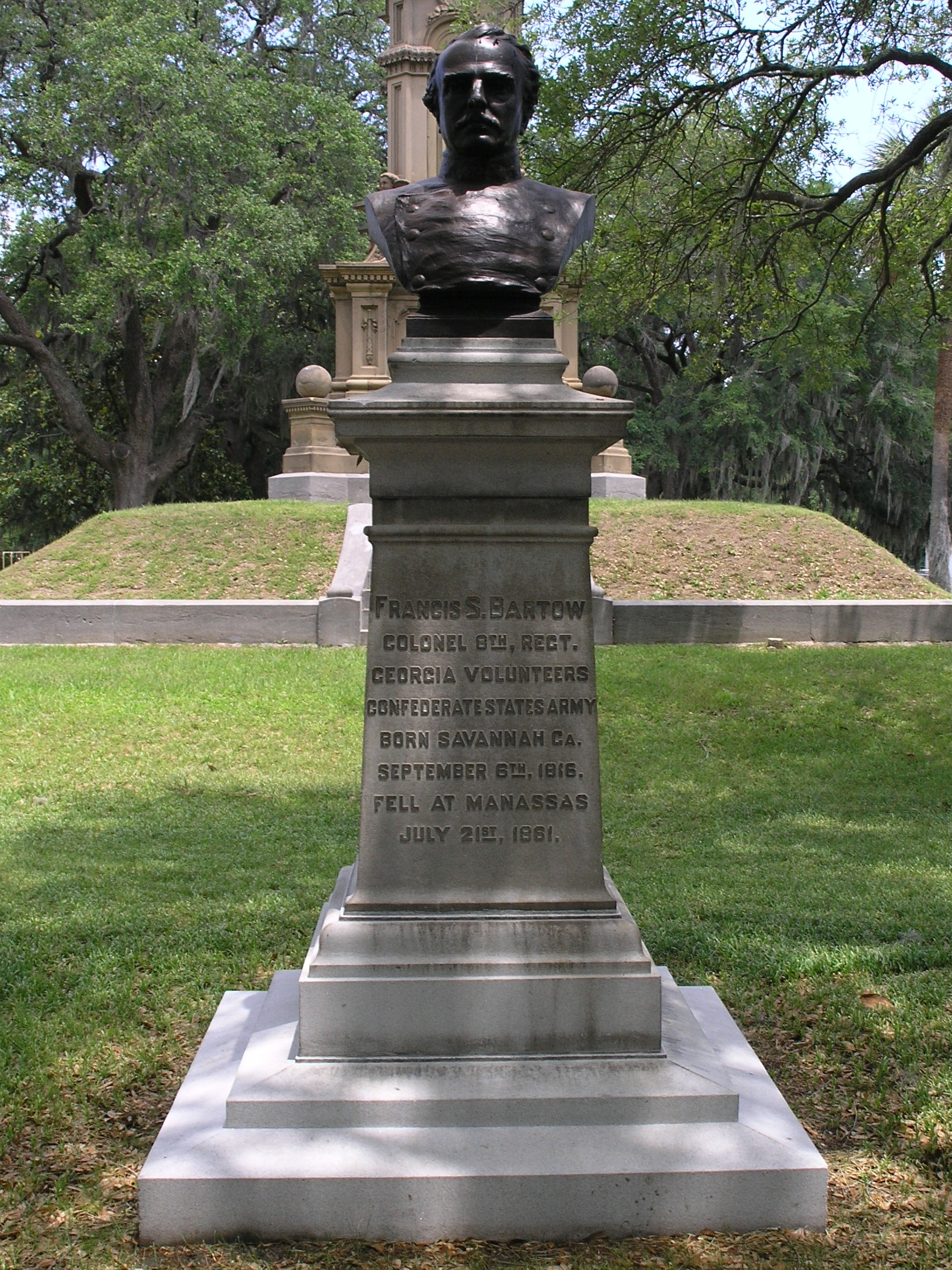
Memorial and bust of Francis S. Bartow in Savannah's Forsyth Park.

After years of postponement due to the war and its effects, on February 7, 1890, the Savannah City Council approved erecting a memorial recognizing native sons Francis Bartow and Lafayette McLaws. Unveiled in 1902, their two bronze busts were mounted on stone pedestals at Chippewa Square. Bartow's faced south towards Perry Street, while McLaws' faced north. About 1910, the council decided to build the Oglethorpe Monument at Chippewa Square. Both generals' busts were therefore relocated to the Confederate Monument at Forsyth Park.

Bartow is buried in Savannah's Laurel Grove Cemetery.

=== Bartow namesakes ===
- Bartow County, Georgia
- Bartow, Georgia
- Bartow, Florida
- Bartow, West Virginia
- In 1968, in Bartow, Florida, the previously all-white Summerlin Institute, was merged with the previously all-black Union Academy, and the school was thereafter known as Bartow High School. The former Union Academy became an integrated middle school.
- SS Francis S. Bartow - Liberty ship 2447

During the Civil War, several Georgia companies carried Bartow's name:

- Macedonia Silver Grays
  - Company B, 10th Battalion Georgia Cavalry - Bartow Mounted Infantry
  - Company C, 10th Battalion Georgia Cavalry - Bartow Raid Repellers
- Georgia Volunteer Infantry
  - Company A, 23rd Regiment - Bartow Yankee Killers
  - Company B, 40th Regiment - Bartow Sentinels/Howard Guards
  - Company I, 40th Regiment - Bartow Rangers

== See also ==
- List of signers of the Georgia Ordinance of Secession
- List of American Civil War generals (Acting Confederate)
