= Dunmore, West Virginia =

Unincorporated community in West Virginia, United States

- Unincorporated community
- Location within West Virginia Location within the United States
- Coordinates: 38°21′34″N 79°52′51″W
- Country: United States
- State: West Virginia
- County: Pocahontas
- Elevation: 2,477 ft (755 m)
- Time zone: UTC-5 (Eastern (EST))
  - Summer (DST): UTC-4 (EDT)
- ZIP code: 24934
- Area codes: 304 & 681
- GNIS feature ID: 1550994

Dunmore is an unincorporated community in Pocahontas County, West Virginia, United States. Dunmore is located at the junction of state routes 28 and 92, 15 miles (24 km) northeast of Marlinton. Dunmore has a post office with ZIP code 24934.

Some say the community has the name of the Earl of Dunmore, while others believe the place name is an amalgamation of Dunkum and Moore, early owners of the town site.

== Climate ==
The climate in this area has mild differences between highs and lows, and there is adequate rainfall year-round. According to the Köppen Climate Classification system, Dunmore has a marine west coast climate, abbreviated "Cfb" on climate maps.
