= Marlinton, West Virginia =

- Town
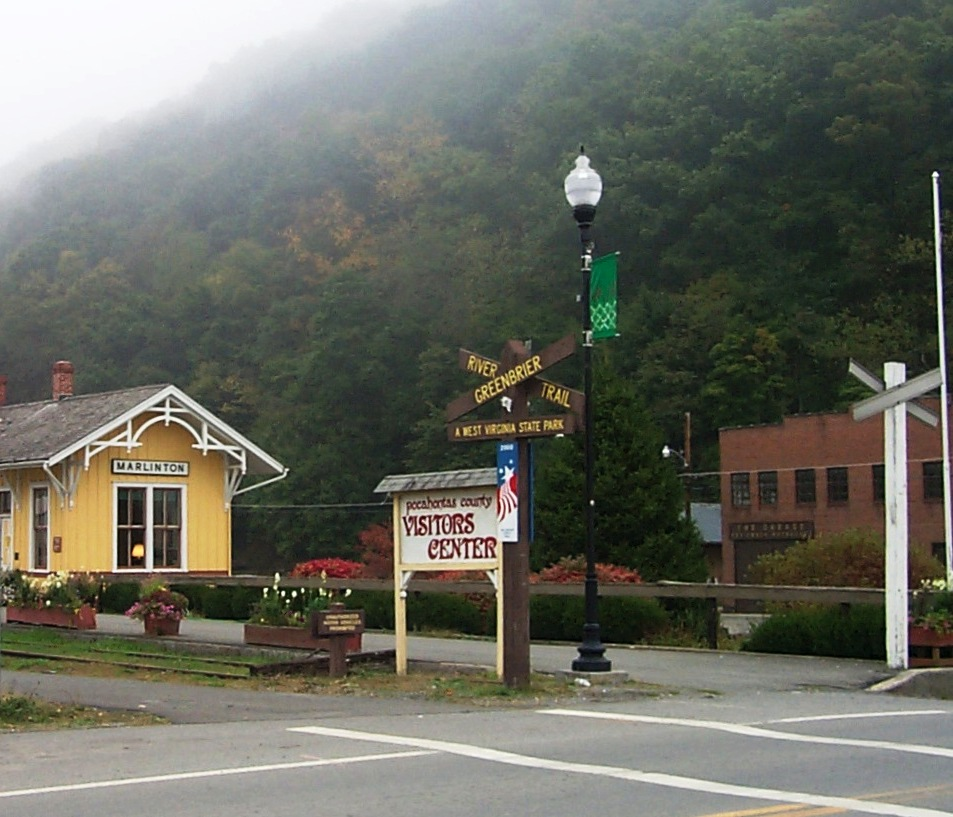
- Historic Depot and the Greenbrier River Trail in Marlinton.

- Flag Seal
- Interactive map of Marlinton, West Virginia
- Location within West Virginia Location within the United States
- Coordinates: 38°13′29″N 80°5′41″W
- Country: United States
- State: West Virginia
- County: Pocahontas

Government
  - Mayor: Sam Felton

Area
  - Total: 2.44 sq mi (6.33 km^{2})
  - Land: 2.35 sq mi (6.09 km^{2})
  - Water: 0.093 sq mi (0.24 km^{2})
- Elevation: 2,126 ft (648 m)

Population (2020)
  - Total: 998
  - Estimate (2021): 982
  - Density: 409/sq mi (157.8/km^{2})
- Time zone: UTC-5 (Eastern (EST))
  - Summer (DST): UTC-4 (EDT)
- ZIP code: 24954
- Area code: 304
- FIPS code: 54-51676
- GNIS feature ID: 1552003
- Website: https://townofmarlintonwv.com/

Marlinton is a town in and the county seat of Pocahontas County, West Virginia, United States. The population was 998 at the 2020 census. Located along the Greenbrier River, it is known for its scenery.

== History ==
Marlinton is named for Jacob Marlin, who, along with Stephen Sewell, became the first non-native settlers west of the Allegheny Mountains, in the Greenbrier Valley in 1749. New Englanders Marlin and Sewell built a cabin in what would become Marlinton, but after various religious disputes, Sewell moved into a nearby hollowed-out sycamore tree. In 1751, surveyor John Lewis discovered the pair. Sewell eventually settled on the eastern side of Sewell Mountain, near present-day Rainelle.

Located at Marlinton and listed on the National Register of Historic Places are the Frank and Anna Hunter House, IOOF Lodge Building, Marlinton Chesapeake and Ohio Railroad Station, Marlinton Opera House, Pocahontas County Courthouse and Jail, and Pocahontas Times Print Shop. Located near Marlinton are Droop Mountain Battlefield and New Deal Resources in Watoga State Park Historic District.

As a result of its rural location and proximity to the facilities of the United States National Radio Quiet Zone, the town has been a late adopter of broadband Internet. A 2018 article in Motherboard explains that the nearby Snowshoe Mountain ski resort has been able to provide fast internet, WiFi, and cell phone coverage by having a custom system built which is specially designed so as not to interfere with radio telescopes.

In 2017 Marlinton became a founding member of the Mon Forest Towns partnership, which includes eleven other small towns within the Monongahela National Forest region.

The Dock Ellis Baseball League, a sandlot baseball league, currently meets yearly in Marlinton for their World Series.

== Geography ==
According to the United States Census Bureau, the town has a total area of 2.53 square miles (6.55 km^{2}), of which 2.44 square miles (6.32 km^{2}) is land and 0.09 square miles (0.23 km^{2}) is water. It is located in the southwest part of the United States National Radio Quiet Zone.

=== Climate ===
The climate in this area has four distinct seasons, with cold winters and warm and humid summers, but mild differences between highs and lows, and there is adequate rainfall year-round. According to the Köppen Climate Classification system, Marlinton has a humid continental climate, abbreviated "Dfb" on climate maps.

Climate data for Marlinton, West Virginia, 1991–2020 normals, 1893-2020 extremes: 2150ft (655m)
Month	Jan	Feb	Mar	Apr	May	Jun	Jul	Aug	Sep	Oct	Nov	Dec	Year
Record high °F (°C)	76 (24)	79 (26)	86 (30)	92 (33)	97 (36)	100 (38)	97 (36)	98 (37)	92 (33)	90 (32)	82 (28)	70 (21)	100 (38)
Mean maximum °F (°C)	57.5 (14.2)	60.6 (15.9)	68.8 (20.4)	78.4 (25.8)	82.0 (27.8)	84.1 (28.9)	85.9 (29.9)	84.8 (29.3)	82.4 (28.0)	75.8 (24.3)	68.4 (20.2)	58.2 (14.6)	85.7 (29.8)
Mean daily maximum °F (°C)	36.3 (2.4)	40.4 (4.7)	48.7 (9.3)	60.3 (15.7)	68.3 (20.2)	75.0 (23.9)	78.4 (25.8)	77.1 (25.1)	72.0 (22.2)	61.9 (16.6)	50.2 (10.1)	39.8 (4.3)	59.0 (15.0)
Daily mean °F (°C)	26.3 (−3.2)	29.4 (−1.4)	36.4 (2.4)	46.7 (8.2)	55.6 (13.1)	63.2 (17.3)	67.0 (19.4)	66.0 (18.9)	60.2 (15.7)	48.7 (9.3)	37.7 (3.2)	29.7 (−1.3)	47.2 (8.5)
Mean daily minimum °F (°C)	16.2 (−8.8)	18.4 (−7.6)	24.1 (−4.4)	33.0 (0.6)	42.9 (6.1)	51.4 (10.8)	55.7 (13.2)	54.8 (12.7)	48.3 (9.1)	35.4 (1.9)	25.2 (−3.8)	19.6 (−6.9)	35.4 (1.9)
Mean minimum °F (°C)	−3.2 (−19.6)	0.6 (−17.4)	8.4 (−13.1)	20.1 (−6.6)	29.0 (−1.7)	38.9 (3.8)	46.2 (7.9)	45.5 (7.5)	34.6 (1.4)	20.8 (−6.2)	12.5 (−10.8)	4.6 (−15.2)	−5.6 (−20.9)
Record low °F (°C)	−27 (−33)	−23 (−31)	−5 (−21)	4 (−16)	20 (−7)	30 (−1)	36 (2)	34 (1)	24 (−4)	8 (−13)	−4 (−20)	−24 (−31)	−27 (−33)
Average precipitation inches (mm)	3.57 (91)	3.17 (81)	4.11 (104)	3.95 (100)	4.82 (122)	3.85 (98)	4.38 (111)	3.88 (99)	3.49 (89)	2.89 (73)	3.05 (77)	3.76 (96)	44.92 (1,141)
Average snowfall inches (cm)	12.20 (31.0)	11.30 (28.7)	7.20 (18.3)	0.80 (2.0)	0.00 (0.00)	0.00 (0.00)	0.00 (0.00)	0.00 (0.00)	0.00 (0.00)	0.10 (0.25)	1.10 (2.8)	9.80 (24.9)	42.5 (107.95)
Source 1: NOAA
Source 2: XMACIS (temp records & monthly max/mins)

== Demographics ==
Historical population
Census	Pop.	Note	%±
1890	5		—
1900	171		3,320.0%
1910	1,045		511.1%
1920	1,177		12.6%
1930	1,586		34.7%
1940	1,644		3.7%
1950	1,645		0.1%
1960	1,586		−3.6%
1970	1,286		−18.9%
1980	1,352		5.1%
1990	1,148		−15.1%
2000	1,204		4.9%
2010	1,054		−12.5%
2020	998		−5.3%
U.S. Decennial Census

=== 2010 census ===
As of the census of 2010, there were 1,054 people, 467 households, and 247 families living in the town. The population density was 432.0 inhabitants per square mile (166.8/km^{2}). There were 658 housing units at an average density of 269.7 per square mile (104.1/km^{2}). The racial makeup of the town was 97.8% White, 1.4% African American, 0.3% Native American, 0.1% from other races, and 0.4% from two or more races. Hispanic or Latino of any race were 0.5% of the population.

There were 467 households, of which 24.4% had children under the age of 18 living with them, 31.7% were married couples living together, 16.5% had a female householder with no husband present, 4.7% had a male householder with no wife present, and 47.1% were non-families. 40.3% of all households were made up of individuals, and 18.2% had someone living alone who was 65 years of age or older. The average household size was 2.12 and the average family size was 2.80.

The median age in the town was 47.4 years. 18.2% of residents were under the age of 18; 7.7% were between the ages of 18 and 24; 20.9% were from 25 to 44; 32% were from 45 to 64; and 21.2% were 65 years of age or older. The gender makeup of the town was 45.6% male and 54.4% female.

=== 2000 census ===
As of the census of 2000, there were 1,204 people, 552 households, and 290 families living in the town. The population density was 539.8 inhabitants per square mile (208.5/km^{2}). There were 653 housing units at an average density of 292.8 per square mile (113.1/km^{2}). The racial makeup of the town was 97.92% White, 1.16% African American, 0.08% Native American, 0.08% Asian, 0.08% from other races, and 0.66% from two or more races. Hispanic or Latino of any race were 0.17% of the population.

There were 552 households, out of which 22.5% had children under the age of 18 living with them, 37.9% were married couples living together, 12.7% had a female householder with no husband present, and 47.3% were non-families. 42.4% of all households were made up of individuals, and 21.4% had someone living alone who was 65 years of age or older. The average household size was 2.04 and the average family size was 2.80.

In the town, the population was spread out, with 19.6% under the age of 18, 7.5% from 18 to 24, 22.8% from 25 to 44, 24.8% from 45 to 64, and 25.2% who were 65 years of age or older. The median age was 45 years. For every 100 females, there were 83.5 males. For every 100 females age 18 and over, there were 76.6 males.

The median income for a household in the town was $21,293, and the median income for a family was $33,125. Males had a median income of $26,500 versus $16,477 for females. The per capita income for the town was $14,957. About 17.5% of families and 24.0% of the population were below the poverty line, including 29.0% of those under age 18 and 16.2% of those age 65 or over.

== Events ==
Marlinton is home to the Roadkill Cook-off and Hudson Cream West Virginia Biscuit Bake Off during the Autumn Harvest Festival. The first cook-off was in 1991, and has become nationally known through television shows about food and travel. The Roadkill Cook-off was cancelled in both 2020 and 2021 due to the COVID-19 pandemic but organizers have restarted the tradition in 2022 and continued to 2023.

== Gallery ==
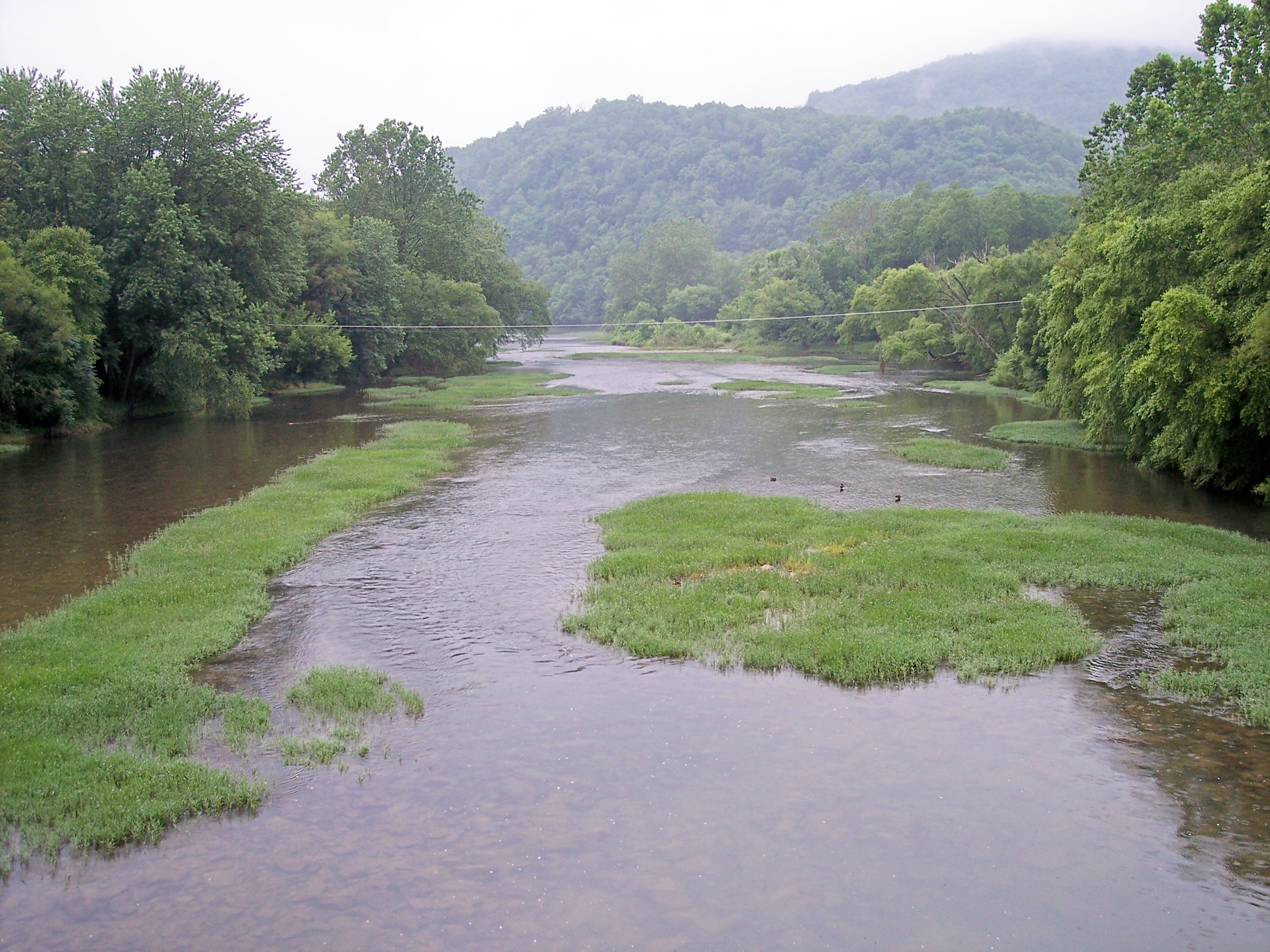
The Greenbrier River in Marlinton

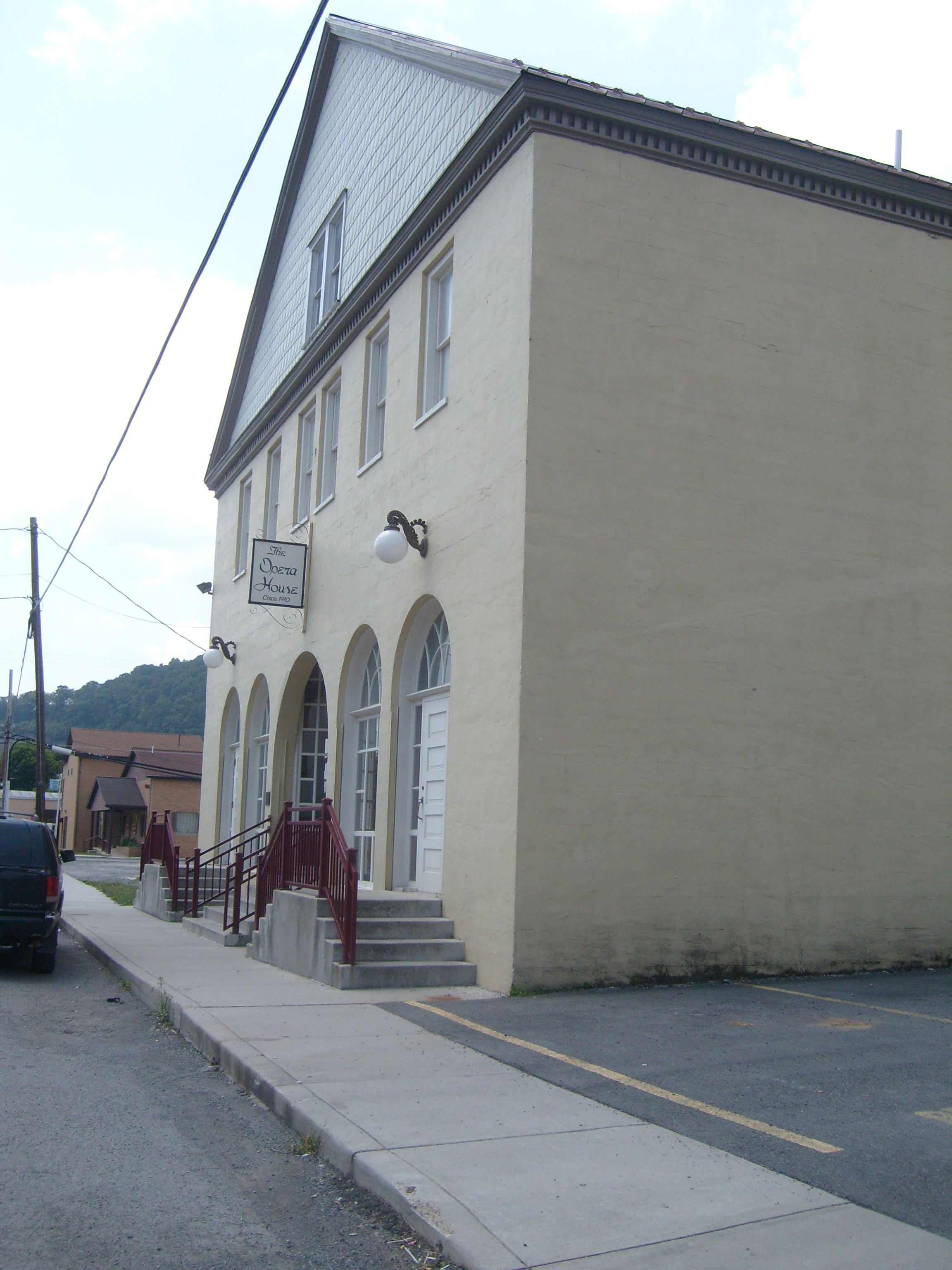
Pocahontas County Opera House
