= Pocahontas County, West Virginia =

County in West Virginia, United States

Pocahontas County
- County
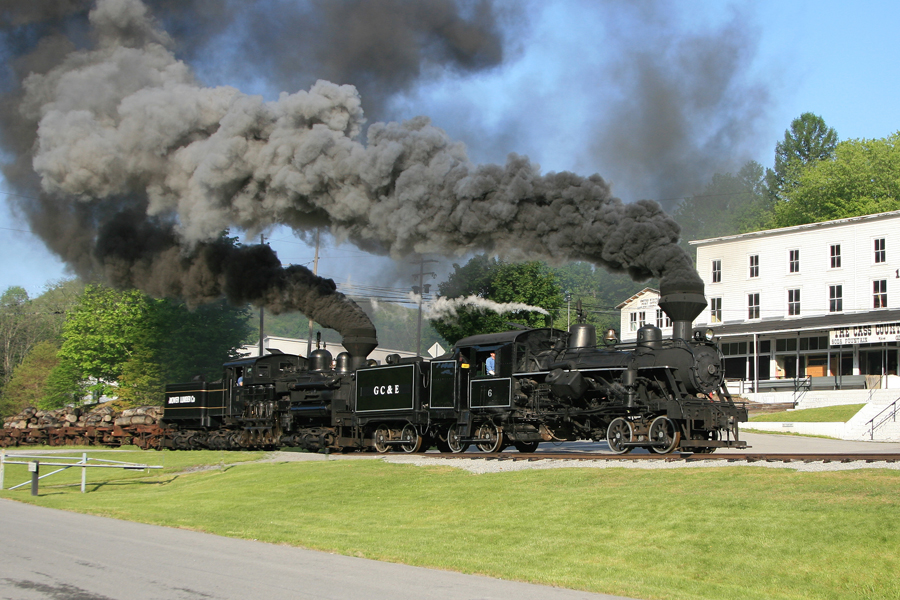
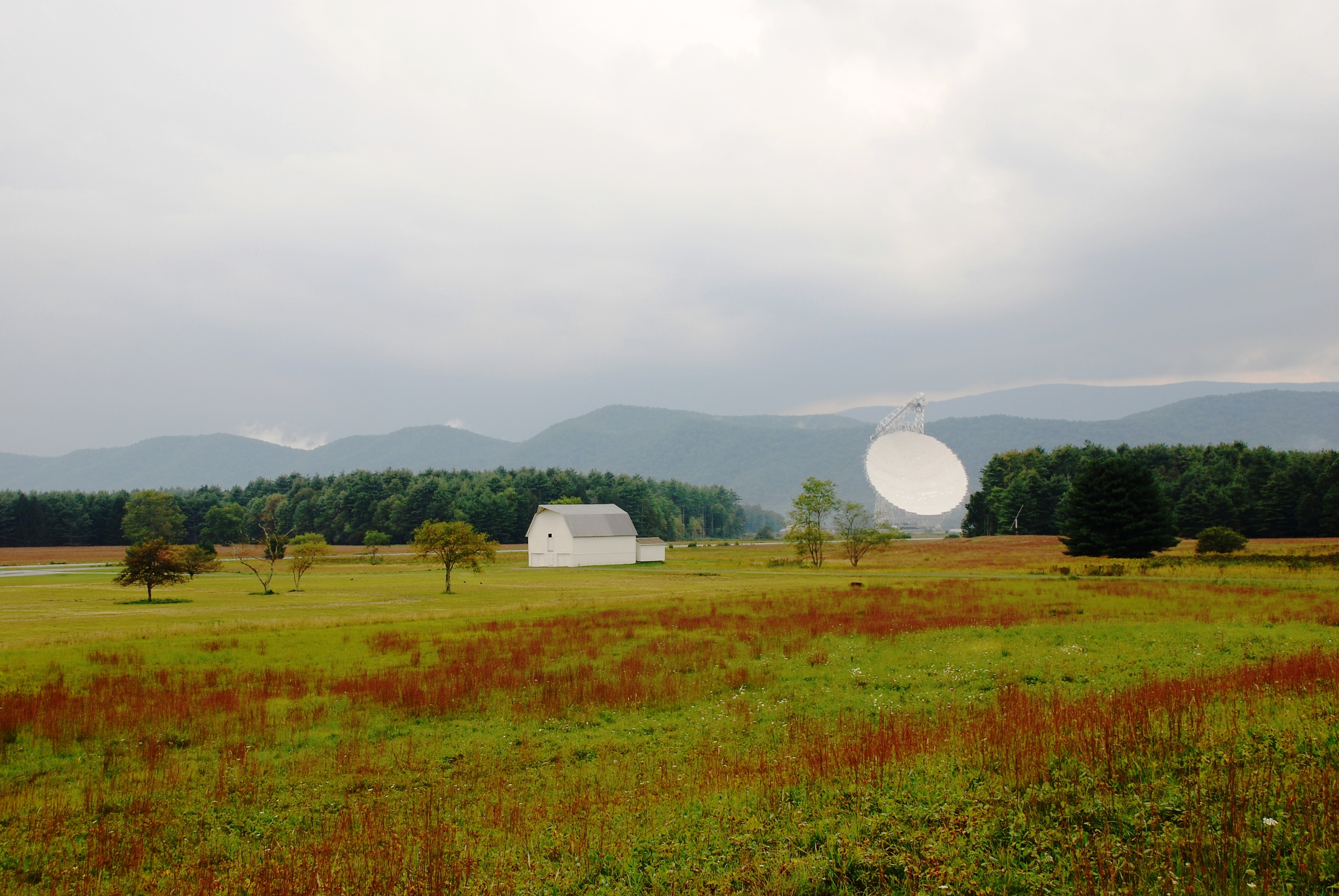
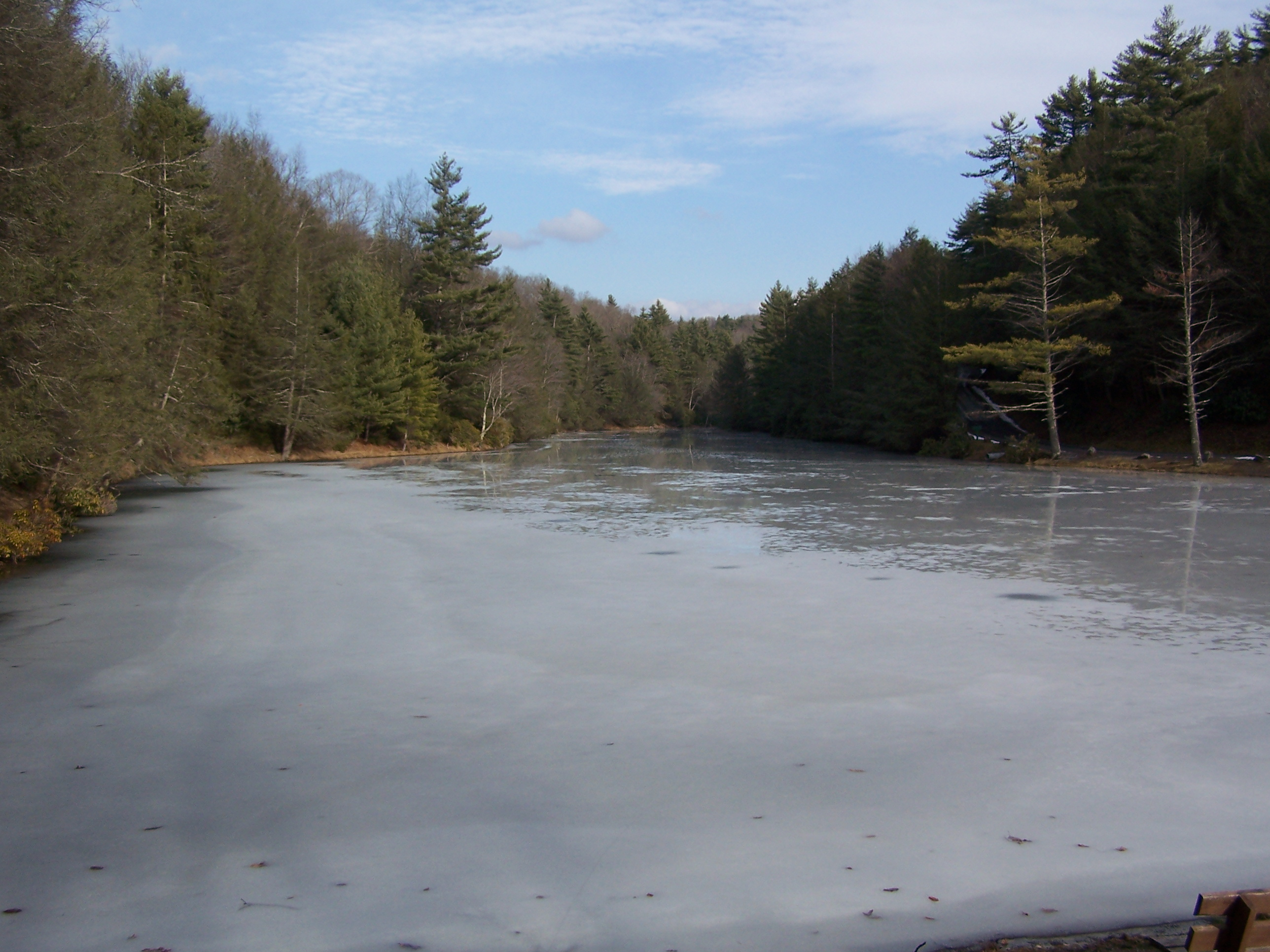
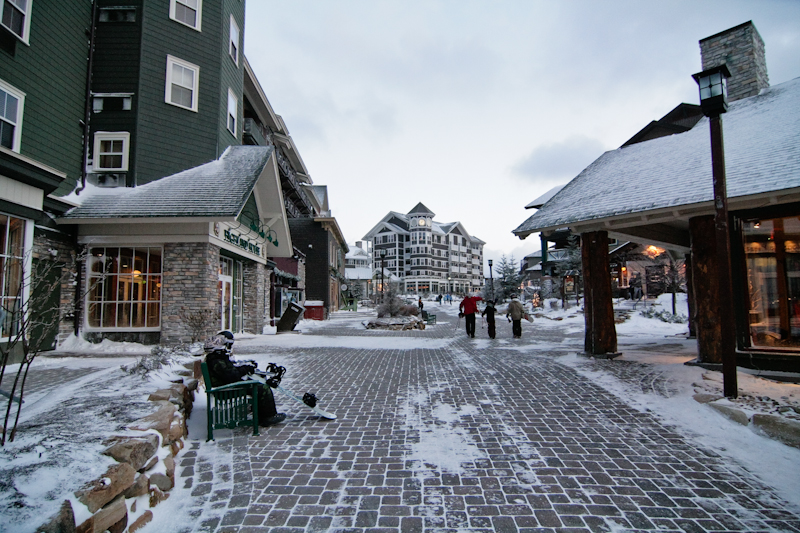
- Pocahontas County Courthouse in Marlinton Cass Scenic Railroad State Park Green Bank Observatory Seneca State Forest Snowshoe Mountain

- Seal

- Location of Pocahontas County in West Virginia

- West Virginia's location within the U.S.
- Country: United States
- State: West Virginia
- Founded: December 21, 1821
- Named for: Pocahontas
- Seat: Marlinton

Government
  - County Commission President: Walt Helmick
  - County Commission: Jamie Walker; John Rebinski

Area
  - Total: 942 sq mi (2,440 km^{2})
  - Land: 940 sq mi (2,400 km^{2})
  - Water: 1.5 sq mi (3.9 km^{2}) 0.2%
  - Rank: 3rd

Population (2020)
  - Total: 7,869
  - Estimate (2025): 7,602 ▼
  - Rank: 47th
  - Density: 8.4/sq mi (3.2/km^{2})
- Time zone: UTC−5 (Eastern)
  - Summer (DST): UTC−4 (EDT)
- Area codes: 304, 681
- Congressional district: 1st
- Senate district: 11th
- House of Delegates districts: 46th, 66th
- Website: https://pocahontascountycommission.com/

Pocahontas County is a county located in the eastern part of the U.S. state of West Virginia. As of the 2020 census, the population was 7,869. Its county seat is Marlinton. The county was established in 1821. It is named after the daughter of the Powhatan chief of the Native Americans in the United States who came from Jamestown, Virginia. She married an English settler, and their children became ancestors of many of the First Families of Virginia.

Pocahontas County is the home to the Green Bank Observatory and is part of the National Radio Quiet Zone.

== History ==
When Andrew Lewis, early American pioneer, surveyor, and soldier from Virginia, came to survey one of the land grants for the Greenbrier Company in 1751, he found Jacob Marlin and Stephen Sewell living where Marlinton later developed. They had come from Frederick, Maryland, in 1749 and are considered to be the first European settlers in this region of Virginia. They built their original cabin where Marlin Run met Knapp's Creek. Lewis had found Sewell living in a large hollow sycamore tree near the cabin. This area is now between Eighth and Ninth avenues and Eighth and Ninth streets of Marlinton.

This area was reserved by the nations of the Iroquois Confederacy as a hunting ground, by right of their conquest of tribes that had been in the area. These American Indians resisted European settlement in the lands they had taken. A treaty of 1758 by Great Britain confirmed the land west of the Allegheny Mountains to the Indians and forbade his Majesty's subjects from settling or hunting here.

But the British settlers continued to move into the Indian hunting grounds, making them a target for many raids and massacres. After the Revolution, the Indians migrated west, and the settlers' land claims were made regular.

During the Civil War Pocahontas County voted to secede from the United States by a vote of 360 to 13 and supported the state government in Richmond. The county contained 907 men of military age (15–50 years old) and provided nearly 700 men to the Confederate army and levied $15,000 for armaments. Farming and harvesting crops soon became difficult due to enlistments, and many of the county's 252 slaves fled during Union troop movements through the county. Some Unionist refugees who had fled to Upshur County enlisted in the 10th West Virginia Infantry Regiment. The battles of Cheat Mountain and Camp Allegheny took place in the county in 1861, and in 1863 the battle of Droop Mountain occurred, resulting in a Union victory.

A government loyal to the United States was established in Wheeling called the Restored Government of Virginia. Under its guidance a bill was introduced to the United States Congress to create a new state from 48 counties of western Virginia to be called West Virginia. While many of these counties were generally loyal to the U.S., many were not but were taken for territorial reasons. The new state was officially recognized on June 20, 1863.

Pocahontas County was added to the new state of West Virginia without the input of the citizens. The new state government in Wheeling reorganized the county militia as a Unionist force. After the war most of the voters in the county were disfranchised due to their support of Richmond and the Confederacy, and full voting rights were not restored until 1871.

The new state government divided the counties into civil townships, with the intention of encouraging local government. This proved impractical in the heavily rural state, and in 1872 the townships were converted into magisterial districts. Pocahontas County was initially divided into four townships, each of which was given a patriotic name: Grant, Lincoln, Meade, and Union. They became magisterial districts in 1872, and all four were renamed the following year: Grant District, originally named for Union General Ulysses S. Grant, became Huntersville District; Lincoln, named after the President, became Edray; Meade, named for General George Meade, became Greenbank, and Union District became Academy. In the 1890s, Academy District was renamed again, becoming Little Levels.

The railroads came late to Pocahontas County, as building rails over the mountains was a difficult and expensive project. It was not until 1899 that construction began but after that, the task moved with startling speed. The 1900 census of the county indicates that many European immigrants came to the region as workers on building the railroads through this area.

Commercial timbering quickly began upon completion of the railroads, including a large mill owned by the West Virginia Pulp & Paper Company (now MeadWestvaco) at Cass. By the end of 1920, dozens of small railroading towns dotted the landscape along the Chesapeake & Ohio Railway line.

== Geography ==
According to the United States Census Bureau, the county has a total area of 942 square miles (2,440 km^{2}), of which 940 square miles (2,400 km^{2}) is land and 1.5 square miles (3.9 km^{2}) (0.2%) is water. It is the third-largest county in West Virginia by area, and with a mean altitude of 3,219 feet or 981 metres it is the sixth-highest county east of the Mississippi River and the highest county in this region outside Western North Carolina.

The highest point is Thorny Flat on Cheat Mountain in the northwestern part of the county, elevation 4,848 feet (1,478 m).

=== Birthplace of rivers ===
The county is the site of the headwaters for eight rivers: Cherry River, Cranberry River, Elk River, Gauley River, Greenbrier River, Tygart Valley River, Williams River, and Shavers Fork of the Cheat River. The Monongahela National Forest protects much of the river headwaters, thereby helping to ensure improved downstream water quality.

=== Adjacent counties ===
- Bath County, Virginia (southeast)
- Greenbrier County (south)
- Pendleton County (northeast)
- Highland County, Virginia (east)
- Randolph County (northwest)
- Webster County (west)

=== Major highways ===
- U.S. Highway 219
- U.S. Highway 250
- West Virginia Route 28
- West Virginia Route 39
- West Virginia Route 55
- West Virginia Route 66
- West Virginia Route 84
- West Virginia Route 92

=== National protected areas ===
- Monongahela National Forest (part)
- Cranberry Glades Botanical Area
- Gaudineer Scenic Area

== Demographics ==
Historical population
Census	Pop.	Note	%±
1830	2,542		—
1840	2,922		14.9%
1850	3,598		23.1%
1860	3,958		10.0%
1870	4,069		2.8%
1880	5,561		36.7%
1890	6,814		22.5%
1900	8,570		25.8%
1910	14,740		72.0%
1920	15,002		1.8%
1930	14,555		−3.0%
1940	13,906		−4.5%
1950	12,480		−10.3%
1960	10,136		−18.8%
1970	8,870		−12.5%
1980	9,919		11.8%
1990	9,008		−9.2%
2000	9,131		1.4%
2010	8,719		−4.5%
2020	7,869		−9.7%
2025 (est.)	7,602	▼	−3.4%
U.S. Decennial Census; 1790–1960 1900–1990; 1990–2000 2010–2019

=== 2020 census ===
As of the 2020 census, the county had a population of 7,869. Of the residents, 17.1% were under the age of 18 and 26.3% were 65 years of age or older; the median age was 50.3 years. For every 100 females there were 105.8 males, and for every 100 females age 18 and over there were 108.4 males.

The racial makeup of the county was 95.3% White, 0.7% Black or African American, 0.1% Asian, 0.3% Native American, 0.5% from other races, and 3.0% from two or more races. Hispanics or Latinos of any race were 1.4% of the population.

There were 3,460 households in the county, of which 23.3% had children under the age of 18 living with them, 47.1% were married couples living together, 24.5% had a male householder with no spouse present, and 23.6% had a female householder with no spouse or partner present. About 33.6% of all households were made up of individuals and 16.5% had someone living alone who was 65 years of age or older.

The average household and family size was 3.48.

There were 6,795 housing units, of which 49.1% were vacant. Among occupied housing units, 81.6% were owner-occupied and 18.4% were renter-occupied. The homeowner vacancy rate was 2.4% and the rental vacancy rate was 60.0%.

The median income for a household was $37,225 and the poverty rate was 17.5%.

Pocahontas County, West Virginia – Racial and ethnic composition Note: the US Census treats Hispanic/Latino as an ethnic category. This table excludes Latinos from the racial categories and assigns them to a separate category. Hispanics/Latinos may be of any race.
Race / Ethnicity (NH = Non-Hispanic)	Pop 2000	Pop 2010	Pop 2020	% 2000	% 2010	% 2020
White alone (NH)	8,948	8,480	7,455	98.00%	97.26%	94.74%
Black or African American alone (NH)	71	58	51	0.78%	0.67%	0.65%
Native American or Alaska Native alone (NH)	4	17	23	0.04%	0.19%	0.29%
Asian alone (NH)	13	4	9	0.14%	0.05%	0.11%
Pacific Islander alone (NH)	0	1	0	0.00%	0.01%	0.00%
Other race alone (NH)	3	4	25	0.03%	0.05%	0.32%
Mixed race or Multiracial (NH)	53	87	199	0.58%	1.00%	2.53%
Hispanic or Latino (any race)	39	68	107	0.43%	0.78%	1.36%
Total	9,131	8,719	7,869	100.00%	100.00%	100.00%

=== 2010 census ===
As of the 2010 United States census, there were 8,719 people, 3,758 households, and 2,373 families living in the county. The population density was 9.3 inhabitants per square mile (3.6/km^{2}). There were 8,847 housing units at an average density of 9.4 units per square mile (3.6 units/km^{2}). The racial makeup of the county was 97.8% white, 0.7% black or African American, 0.2% American Indian, 0.2% from other races, and 1.0% from two or more races. Those of Hispanic or Latino origin made up 0.8% of the population. In terms of ancestry, 23.0% were German, 20.1% were Irish, 12.7% were English, 9.9% were American, 5.2% were Scottish, and 5.1% were Dutch.

Of the 3,758 households, 24.1% had children under the age of 18 living with them, 49.1% were married couples living together, 9.1% had a female householder with no husband present, 36.9% were non-families, and 31.3% of all households were made up of individuals. The average household size was 2.24 and the average family size was 2.75. The median age was 47.1 years.

The median income for a household in the county was $32,161 and the median income for a family was $40,906. Males had a median income of $32,411 versus $25,321 for females. The per capita income for the county was $19,763. About 11.8% of families and 15.3% of the population were below the poverty line, including 20.6% of those under age 18 and 11.7% of those age 65 or over.

=== 2000 census ===
As of the census of 2000, there were 9,131 people, 3,835 households, and 527 families living in the county. The population density was 10 people per square mile (3.9 people/km^{2}). There were 7,594 housing units at an average density of 8 units per square mile (3.1 units/km^{2}). The racial makeup of the county was 98.38% White, 0.78% Black or African American, 0.07% Native American, 0.14% Asian, 0.05% from other races, and 0.58% from two or more races. 0.43% of the population were Hispanic or Latino of any race.

There were 3,835 households, out of which 25.80% had children under the age of 18 living with them, 53.90% were married couples living together, 7.90% had a female householder with no husband present, and 34.10% were non-families. 29.60% of all households were made up of individuals, and 14.40% had someone living alone who was 65 years of age or older. The average household size was 2.30 and the average family size was 2.83.

In the county, the population was spread out, with 20.90% under the age of 18, 7.00% from 18 to 24, 27.50% from 25 to 44, 27.40% from 45 to 64, and 17.30% who were 65 years of age or older. The median age was 42 years. For every 100 females there were 106.20 males. For every 100 females age 18 and over, there were 103.60 males.

The median income for a household in the county was $26,401, and the median income for a family was $32,511. Males had a median income of $26,173 versus $16,780 for females. The per capita income for the county was $14,384. About 12.70% of families and 17.10% of individuals were below the poverty line, including 20.20% of those under age 18 and 14.60% of those age 65 or over.

== Politics ==
Pocahontas County has voted Republican in every election since 2000. Donald Trump solidified the party's grip on the county in 2024, winning the largest vote share in the county's history with over 74% of the vote.

United States presidential election results for Pocahontas County, West Virginia
Year	Republican		Democratic		Third party(ies)	
Year	No.	%	No.	%	No.	%
1912	589	18.42%	1,428	44.67%	1,180	36.91%
1916	1,550	44.90%	1,849	53.56%	53	1.54%
1920	2,836	52.32%	2,540	46.85%	45	0.83%
1924	2,782	49.14%	2,777	49.05%	102	1.80%
1928	3,141	55.55%	2,487	43.99%	26	0.46%
1932	2,623	42.34%	3,531	57.00%	41	0.66%
1936	2,850	40.84%	4,118	59.01%	10	0.14%
1940	2,886	44.47%	3,604	55.53%	0	0.00%
1944	2,340	44.68%	2,897	55.32%	0	0.00%
1948	2,373	46.24%	2,754	53.66%	5	0.10%
1952	2,841	50.88%	2,743	49.12%	0	0.00%
1956	2,937	53.69%	2,533	46.31%	0	0.00%
1960	2,469	46.66%	2,822	53.34%	0	0.00%
1964	1,716	34.09%	3,317	65.91%	0	0.00%
1968	2,040	46.01%	1,948	43.93%	446	10.06%
1972	2,391	59.39%	1,635	40.61%	0	0.00%
1976	1,740	42.75%	2,330	57.25%	0	0.00%
1980	2,011	46.18%	2,170	49.83%	174	4.00%
1984	2,479	56.52%	1,903	43.39%	4	0.09%
1988	1,876	48.70%	1,958	50.83%	18	0.47%
1992	1,401	37.05%	1,741	46.05%	639	16.90%
1996	1,242	35.68%	1,796	51.59%	443	12.73%
2000	1,970	56.82%	1,392	40.15%	105	3.03%
2004	2,295	58.58%	1,573	40.15%	50	1.28%
2008	2,011	55.22%	1,548	42.50%	83	2.28%
2012	2,182	60.76%	1,303	36.29%	106	2.95%
2016	2,496	67.92%	928	25.25%	251	6.83%
2020	2,895	72.21%	1,047	26.12%	67	1.67%
2024	2,889	74.06%	927	23.76%	85	2.18%

== Law and government ==
Pocahontas County is governed by a three-person, elected county commission. Other elected officers include the sheriff, county clerk, circuit clerk, assessor, prosecuting attorney, surveyor, two circuit judges, two magistrates, and a family court judge. There is also a five-member school board and six conservation district supervisors, with at least two from each county in the district.

=== County Offices ===
==== Board of Education ====
Position	Holder	Party	Term expires
Board President	Emery Grimes	non-partisan	Unknown
Board Member	Samuel Gibson	non-partisan	Unknown
Board Member	Dr. Sue Hollandsworth	non-partisan	Unknown
Board Member	Andrew "Frosty" McNabb	non-partisan	Unknown
Board Member	Morgan McComb	non-partisan	Unknown

==== Commissioners ====
District	Holder	Party	Term expires
Central	Jamie Walker	Republican	2028
Northern	John Rebinski	Republican	Unknown
Southern	Thane Ryder	Republican	2031

Commissioners are elected to six-year terms, with one of the three commission offices up for election every two years. The entire county votes for a candidate.

==== Conservation District Supervisors ====
Office	Holder	Party	Term expires
Supervisor (Chairperson)	Gary Sawyers (Greenbrier)	non-partisan	2028
Supervisor (Vice-chair)	Timothy VanReenen (Pocahontas)	non-partisan	2028
Supervisor (Treasurer)	Gary Truex (Greenbrier)	non-partisan	2026
Supervisor	Donald McNeel (Pocahontas)	non-partisan	2028
Supervisor	Avery Atkins (Monroe)	non-partisan	2026
Supervisor	Carolyn Miller (Monroe)	non-partisan	2028

Pocahontas, along with Greenbrier and Monroe counties, is represented by the Greenbrier Valley district. At least two supervisors per county are elected during primaries and serve four-year terms.

==== Other County Offices ====
Office	Holder	Party	Term Expires
Assessor	Johnny A. Pritt	Republican	2028
Clerk	Melissa Bennett	Democrat	2026
Prosecuting Attorney	Laura M. Kershner	Democrat	2028
Sheriff	Troy McCoy	Democrat	2028
Surveyor	Vacant		

=== Judicial ===
Pocahontas along with Greenbrier county is in the 29th Judicial Circuit.

==== Circuit Court ====
Division	Holder	Party	Term expires
1	Robert E. Richardson	Non-partisan	2032
2	Patrick I. Via	Non-partisan	2032
Clerk	Connie M. Carr	Democrat	2026

Circuit Court Judges are elected to eight-year terms. Clerks are elected to six-year terms.

==== Family Court ====
Office	Holder	Party	Term expires
Judge	Joyce Helmick Carpenter	non-partisan	2032

Pocahontas, along with, Braxton, and Webster counties make up the 27th Family Court Circuit. Judges are elected to eight-year terms.

==== Magistrate Court ====
Division	Holder	Party	Term expires
1	Cynthia D. Broce-Kelley	non-partisan	2028
2	Jennifer Dunz	non-partisan	2028
Clerk	Nancy Jordan		

Magistrates are elected in non-partisan elections during primaries, and serve four-year terms.

=== State Legislature ===
Each county in West Virginia is represented by one or more House of Delegates members and state senators.

==== House of Delegates ====
District	Holder	Party	Term expires
46	Jeff Campbell	Republican	2026
66	Jonathan Kyle	Republican	2026

Pocahontas County is represented by the 46th, and 66th District in the West Virginia House of Delegates. Delegates serve two-year terms with all of the seats up for election every two years.

==== State Senate ====
Holder	Party	Term expires
Bill Hamilton	Republican	2026
Robbie Morris	Republican	2028

Pocahontas County is currently represented by West Virginia's 11th Senate district. Senators serve four-year terms, with half of the seats up for election every two years.

=== Federal Representatives ===
==== United States House of Representatives ====
District	Holder	Party	Term expires
1st	Carol Miller	Republican	2027

Pocahontas County is represented in congress by the 1st congressional district of West Virginia.

==== United States Senate ====
Senator	Party	Term expires
Jim Justice	Republican	2031
Shelley Moore Capito	Republican	2027

== Economy ==
=== Tourism ===
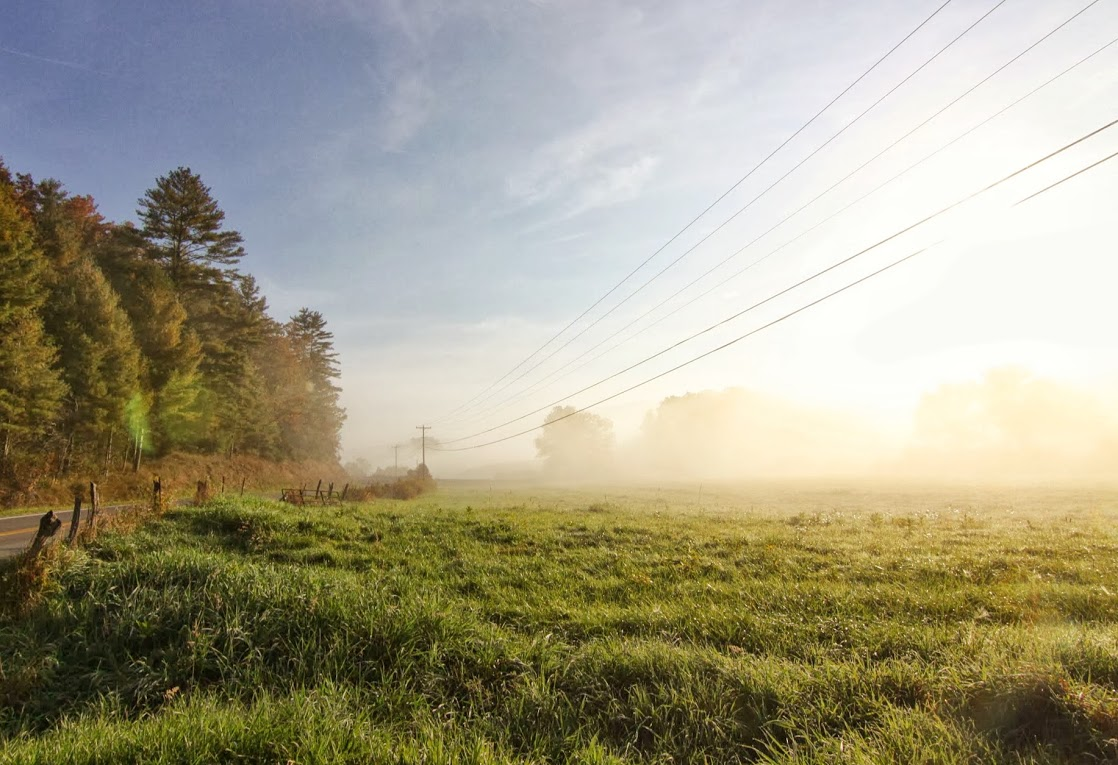
Countryside off Route 28 near Dunmore, WV

As of 2008, there were approximately 30,000 out-of-towners who own property in Pocahontas County. The tourism industry has continued to be one of the county's largest economic industries. The main attraction is Snowshoe Mountain that is popular with tourists in the summer and winter.

== Communities ==
=== Towns ===
- Durbin
- Hillsboro
- Marlinton (county seat)

=== Magisterial districts ===
- Edray
- Greenbank
- Huntersville
- Little Levels

=== Census-designated places ===
- Arbovale
- Bartow
- Cass
- Frank
- Green Bank
- Huntersville

=== Unincorporated communities ===
- Buckeye
- Clover Lick
- Droop
- Dunmore
- Edray
- Frost
- Jacox
- Knapp
- Mill Point
- Minnehaha Springs
- Seebert
- Slatyfork
- Snowshoe
- Stony Bottom
- Violet

== Notable people ==
- Pearl S. Buck, author, was born in Hillsboro.
- W. E. Blackhurst, author
- Louise McNeill, poet and historian
- William Luther Pierce, leader of the National Alliance lived on property near Mill Point.
- Patch Adams, the clown physician, established his Gesundheit! Institute in Hillsboro and has been raising money since 1980 toward opening a long-promised rural hospital. Some locals have called it "a big scam."
- Wulf Zendik, founder of the Zendik Farm, is buried on his commune's former property in central Pocahontas County.

== In popular culture ==
- The Amnesty campaign of actual play podcast The Adventure Zone takes place in a fictional town within Pocahontas County.
- Tyler Childers' song "Universal Sound" is set in Pocahontas County at the Cranberry Glades.

== See also ==
- The Pearl S. Buck Birthplace
- Cass Scenic Railroad State Park
- Droop Mountain Battlefield State Park
- Greenbrier River Trail
- Handley Wildlife Management Area
- National Radio Astronomy Observatory
- National Register of Historic Places listings in Pocahontas County, West Virginia
- Watoga State Park
- Shavers Mountain
- Spice Run Wilderness
