= List of West Virginia state forests =

West Virginia contains a network of eight state forests that help to protect over 70,000 acres (28,000 ha) of wooded lands in the state. Most of the forests are managed by the West Virginia Division of Forestry, although Kanawha State Forest is managed as a state park by the Division of Natural Resources. All of the forests except for Calvin Price contain recreational facilities managed in cooperation with the DNR.

== West Virginia state forests ==
West Virginia state forests
	Forest	County	Area		Accommodations		Historical interest	Swimming	Gift shop	Lakes	Boat rentals
	Forest	County	Acres	Hectares	Cabins	Camping	Historical interest	Swimming	Gift shop	Lakes	Boat rentals
Thumbnail image of Tick Ridge Fire Tower at Cabwaylingo State Forest	Cabwaylingo	Wayne	8,125	3,288	14	21		Check mark	Check mark		
Thumbnail image of entrance sign for Calvin Price State Forest	Calvin Price	Greenbrier; Pocahontas	9,482	3,837							
	Camp Creek	Mercer	5,397	2,184					Check mark		
Thumbnail image of Cheat River at Coopers Rock State Forest	Coopers Rock	Monongalia; Preston	12,747	5,159		50	Check mark		Check mark	Check mark	
Thumbnail image of Howard Creek gap from Greenbrier State Forest	Greenbrier	Greenbrier	5,130	2,076	13	16		Check mark	Check mark		
Thumbnail image of Kanawha State Forest entrance sign	Kanawha	Kanawha	9,052	3,663		46	Check mark			Check mark	
Thumbnail image of Mill Creek Falls in Kumbrabow State Forest	Kumbrabow	Randolph	9,474	3,834	6	13		Check mark	Check mark		
Thumbnail image of Seneca Lake in Seneca State Forest	Seneca	Pocahontas	11,684	4,728	8	10			Check mark	Check mark	Check mark
Former West Virginia State Forests
Thumbnail image of Panther Creek in Panther Wildlife Management Areas	Panther State Forest – Transferred to West Virginia Division of Natural Resources to become Panther Wildlife Management Area in 2008.										
Thumbnail image of Watoga Lake in Watoga State Park	Watoga State Forest – Established in January 1925 as Watoga State Forest. Became Watoga State Park in 1934.										

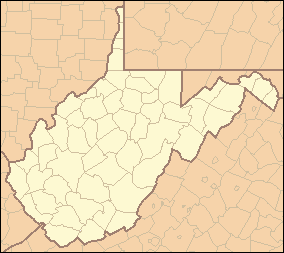
Map of State Forests of West Virginia
(Each dot is linked to the corresponding forest article)

== See also ==
- List of national forests of the United States
- List of West Virginia state parks
- List of West Virginia wildlife management areas
