= Droop, West Virginia =

Unincorporated community in West Virginia, United States

Droop
- Unincorporated community
- Location within the state of West Virginia Droop (the United States)
- Coordinates: 38°5′6″N 80°17′5″W
- Country: United States
- State: West Virginia
- County: Pocahontas
- Time zone: UTC-5 (Eastern (EST))
  - Summer (DST): UTC-4 (EDT)
- ZIP codes: 24933

Droop is an unincorporated community in Pocahontas County, West Virginia, United States, in the Greenbrier River Valley.

The community takes its name from nearby Droop Mountain. The area lends its name to Droop Mountain Battlefield State Park, site of West Virginia's last significant Civil War battle. The Civilian Conservation Corps (CCC) constructed the park's trails and buildings in the 1930s, as part of Franklin D. Roosevelt's New Deal legislation. Today, a small museum on the park grounds houses Civil War artifacts and discusses the park's CCC history. Bi-annually, the West Virginia Reenactors Association reenacts the Droop Mountain battle.

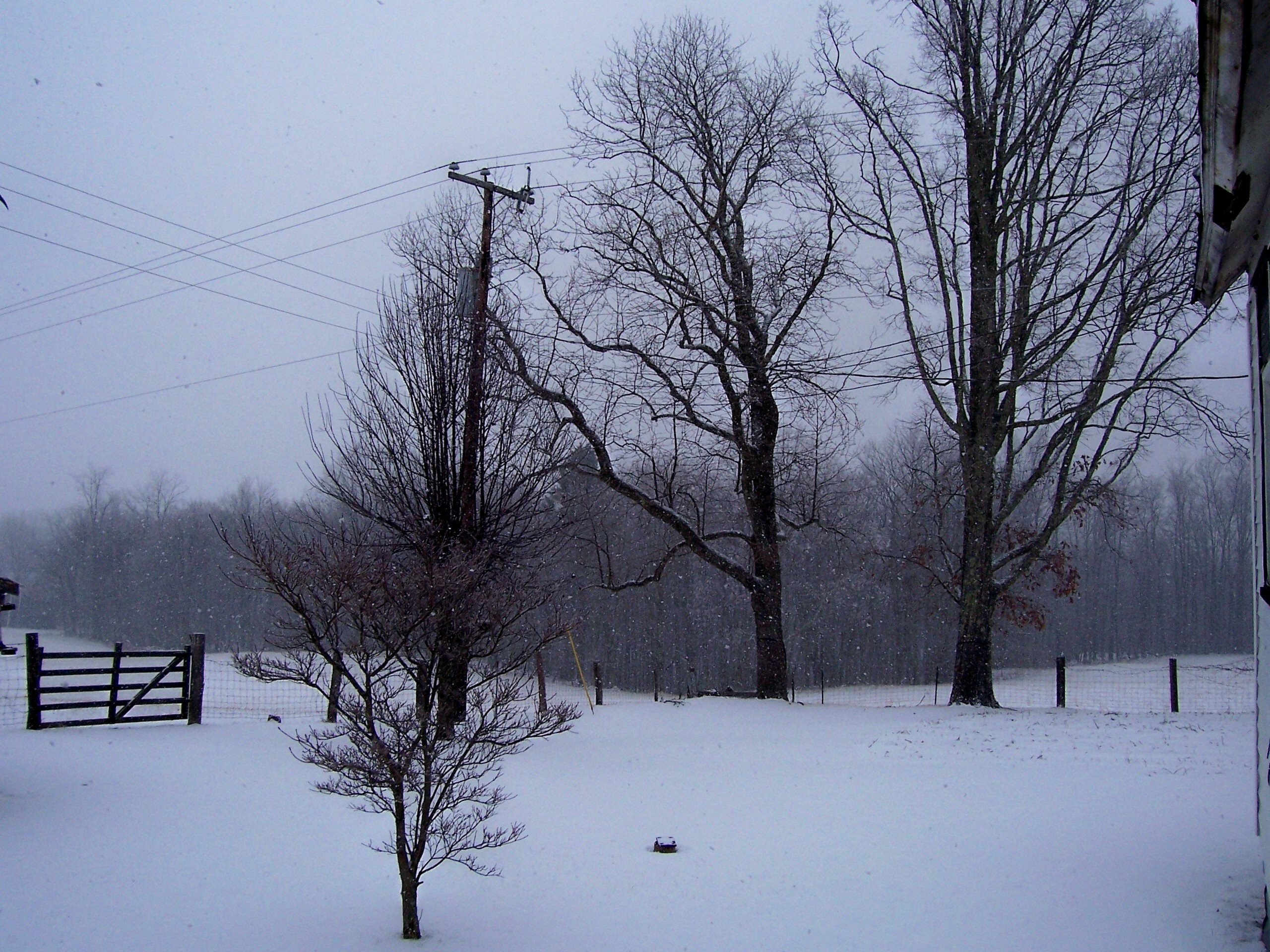
Snowy Day at Droop Mountain

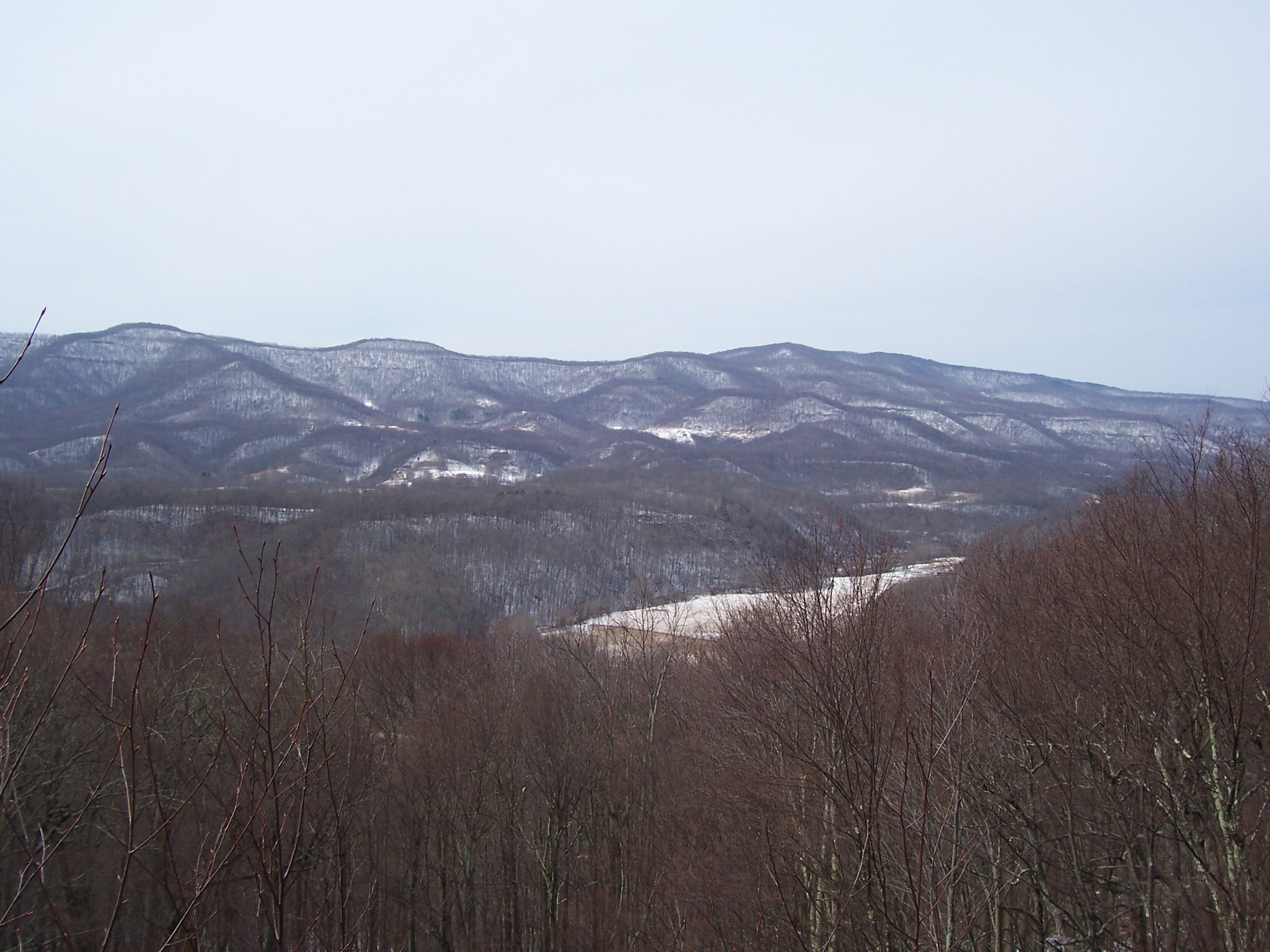
Overlook at the Park

== Places of interest ==
- Droop Mountain Battlefield State Park
- The Civilian Conservation Corps Museum, Civil War History
- Beartown State Park
- Hiking Trails at Both State Parks
- The nearby town of Hillsboro, West Virginia
- The Pearl S. Buck Birthplace
