= Droop =

To droop means to hang down or sag, particularly if limp. Droop may also refer to:

== Technical usage ==
- Droop nose (aeronautics), an adjustable nose found on some supersonic aircraft
- Droop quota, a type of quota for determining winners and transferring votes in an election
- Droop speed control, a speed control mode of a prime mover driving a synchronous generator connected to an electrical grid.
- Leading-edge droop flap, a type of high-lift device found on the wings of some aircraft
- Leading-edge droop, a feature of some aircraft wings
- LED droop, the lowering of efficiency of light-emitting diodes at higher electrical currents
- The steady-state error of a proportional controller
- Voltage droop, the intentional loss in output voltage of a power supply as it drives a load

== People ==
- Marie Luise Droop (1890-1959), a German writer and producer
- Henry Richmond Droop (1831–1884), an English mathematician
- John Percival Droop (1882–1963), a British classical archaeologist
- Droop-E, American rapper

== Fictional characters ==
- Droopy, cartoon character
- Drooper, a character from the television show The Banana Splits
- Droop, a Muppet character from the television series The Muppet Show
- Droop-a-Long, a cartoon character from the segment Ricochet Rabbit & Droop-a-Long in The Magilla Gorilla Show

== Places ==
- Droop, West Virginia
- Droop Hill, a mountain landform in the Kincardine and Mearns region of Aberdeenshire, Scotland
- Droop Mountain, a small mountain in the Allegheny Mountains in West Virginia, United States

== Other uses ==
- Ptosis (disambiguation), drooping of body parts
- Droop cup, a type of bowl from Ancient Greece / Laconia, named after John Percival Droop
- "Droop" (RuPaul's Drag Race), an episode of the American television series RuPaul's Drag Race

== See also ==
- Drupe, a form of fruit
- Drop (disambiguation)
