= School of Hard Knocks (disambiguation) =

School of Hard Knocks is an idiomatic phrase meaning the (sometimes painful) education one gets from life's usually negative experiences.

School of Hard Knocks may also refer to:

- School of Hard Knocks (TV series), a British television series
- "School of Hard Knocks" (After You've Gone), a 2007 television episode
- "School of Hard Knocks" (Desperate Housewives), a 2011 television episode
- School of Hard Knocks, a 1990 album by Pat Travers Band
- "School of Hard Knocks" (song), a 2000 song by P.O.D.
- School of Hard Knocks (GURPS), a 1989 role-playing game adventure for GURPS

== See also ==
- School of Life (disambiguation)
