= University of Life (disambiguation) =

University of Life is an idiomatic phrase meaning the (sometimes painful) education one gets from life's usually negative experiences.

University of Life may also refer to:

- Life University, in USA
- University of Life Sciences in Lublin, in Poland
- University of Life Sciences in Poznań, in Poland
- University of Life Sciences in Wroclaw, in Poland
- University of Life Theater and Recreational Arena, former name of sports arena in Pasig, Philippines
- University of Life, a former vocational school in Pasig, Philippines
