= Spice, West Virginia =

- Unincorporated community
- Location within West Virginia Location within the United States
- Coordinates: 38°06′36″N 80°15′59″W
- Country: United States
- State: West Virginia
- County: Pocahontas
- Elevation: 3,002 ft (915 m)
- Time zone: UTC-5 (Eastern (EST))
  - Summer (DST): UTC-4 (EDT)
- Area codes: 304 & 681
- GNIS feature ID: 1555682

Spice is an unincorporated community in Pocahontas County, West Virginia, United States. Spice is located on U.S. Route 219, 3.5 miles (5.6 km) southwest of Hillsboro.

== History ==
A post office called Spice was established in 1912, and remained in operation until it was discontinued in 1943. The community was named for the spices harvested in the hills.
