= Kennison, West Virginia =

- Unincorporated community
- Location within West Virginia Location within the United States
- Coordinates: 38°06′27″N 80°11′09″W
- Country: United States
- State: West Virginia
- County: Pocahontas
- Elevation: 2,034 ft (620 m)
- Time zone: UTC-5 (Eastern (EST))
  - Summer (DST): UTC-4 (EDT)
- Area codes: 304 & 681
- GNIS feature ID: 1554860

Kennison is an unincorporated community in Pocahontas County, West Virginia, United States. Kennison is located along the Greenbrier River, 2.5 miles (4.0 km) southeast of Hillsboro.
