= Hills Creek =

Hills Creek is a name found in several places in the United States.

In Tioga County, Pennsylvania:

- Hills Creek State Park, a Pennsylvania State Park in Tioga County
- Hills Creek, a tributary of the Tioga River in Tioga County, Pennsylvania
- Hills Creek, a stream in Alabama
- Hills Creek, a stream in West Virginia
- Hills Creek, a stream in Oregon
- Hills Creek, there are two streams in California with this name.
- Hills Creek, a stream in Georgia
