= Lobelia (disambiguation) =

Lobelia is a genus of flowering plants.

Lobelia may also refer to:

- Lobelia, West Virginia
- Lobelia, a Belgian naval vessel
- 1066 Lobelia, a minor planet
- Lobelia Sackville-Baggins, a character in J. R. R. Tolkien's The Lord of the Rings
- Lobelia, a character in Dead or Alive Xtreme Venus Vacation
