= List of botanical gardens and arboretums in West Virginia =

This list of botanical gardens and arboretums in West Virginia is intended to include all significant botanical gardens and arboretums in the U.S. state of West Virginia

Name	Image	Affiliation	City
Brooks Memorial Arboretum			Hillsboro
Core Arboretum		West Virginia University	Morgantown
Cranberry Glades		Monongahela National Forest	Mill Point
Sunshine Farm and Gardens			Renick
West Virginia Botanic Garden			Morgantown
The Mary Price Ratrie Arboretum		City of Charleston	Charleston

== See also ==
- List of botanical gardens and arboretums in the United States
