= Bruffey Creek =

Stream in West Virginia, U.S.

Coordinates: 38°07′10″N 80°16′40″W

Bruffey Creek (also Bruffey's Creek) is a stream in Pocahontas County in the U.S. state of West Virginia. The nearest town is Lobelia, West Virginia.

The creek's sink joins the Hills Creek sink to form the Hills-Bruffey cave system.

== History ==
Bruffey Creek has the name of Patrick Bruffey, an early settler.

In 1910, Bruffey's Creek School, a two-room school, was constructed on the creek bank. It closed in 1935 and was demolished in the early 1940s.

== See also ==
- List of rivers of West Virginia
