= Droop Mountain =

Mountain in West Virginia, United States

Coordinates: 38°02′48″N 80°15′53″W

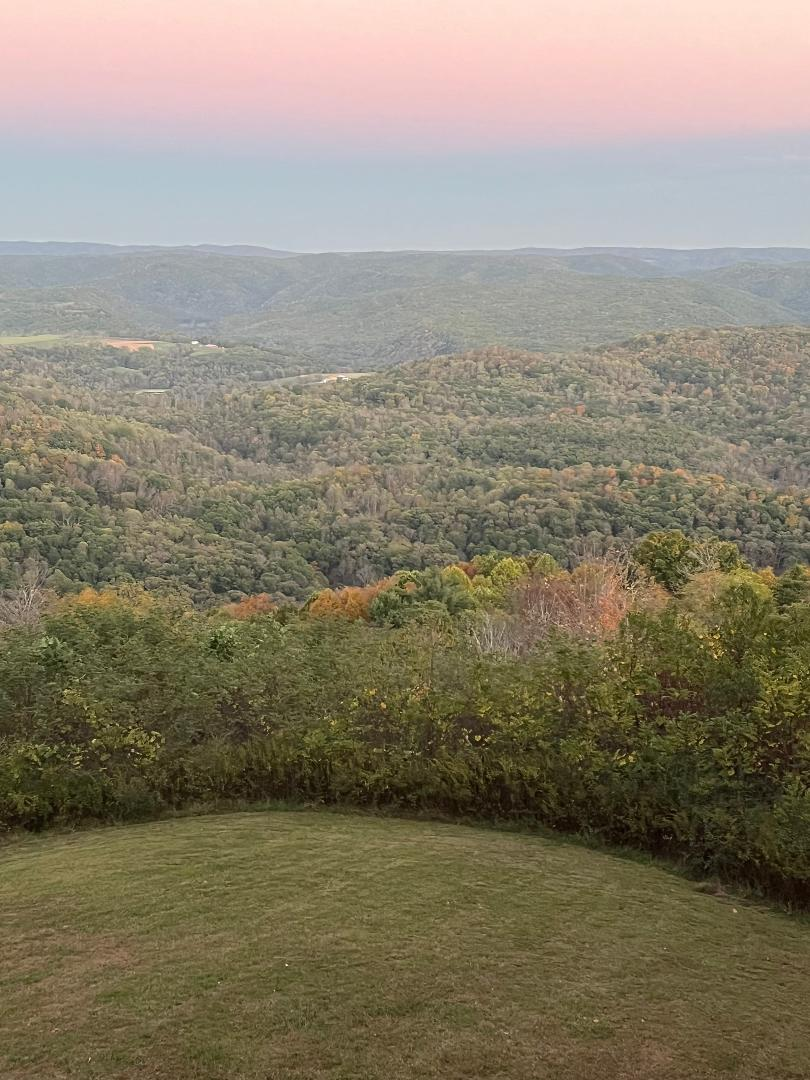
View from top of Droop Mountain in 2024

Droop Mountain is a small mountain in the Allegheny Mountains on the border of Greenbrier and Pocahontas counties in southeastern West Virginia. It was the scene of one of West Virginia's most important battles during the American Civil War—the Battle of Droop Mountain.

Droop Mountain, rising 3597 feet above sea level, is located southwest of Hillsboro, West Virginia, on U.S. Route 219. During the Civil War, it formed a barrier to north-south passage along the west bank of the Greenbrier River, blocking troop movements. A determined Union attack on November 6, 1863, successfully drove off Confederate defenders, essentially ending Confederate resistance in West Virginia.

Much of the mountain is now part of Droop Mountain Battlefield State Park, encompassing the preserved Civil War battlefield. The mountain is also home to the unincorporated town of Droop, West Virginia.

The mountain most likely was so named on account of its "drooping" outline.
