= Richard Beard House =

Historic house in West Virginia, United States

- U.S. National Register of Historic Places
- Location within West Virginia Location within the United States
- Location: Off County Road 31 on Kyle Beard Rd., near Hillsboro, West Virginia
- Coordinates: 38°5′16″N 80°14′15″W
- Area: 1.6 acres (0.65 ha)
- Built: c. 1890
- Built by: Littlepage, Howard; Littlepage, Dassenville
- Architectural style: Queen Anne
- NRHP reference No.: 02000255
- Added to NRHP: March 20, 2002

Richard Beard House is a historic home located near Hillsboro, Pocahontas County, West Virginia. It was built about 1890, and is a two-story Queen Anne style frame dwelling. The house has a side facing T-plan. The front facade features a one-story front porch running one half the width of the house and a three-sided, hip roof bay. Also on the property is a spring house dated to about 1890.

It was listed on the National Register of Historic Places in 2002.
