= Jim Comstock =

American writer, newspaper publisher and humorist

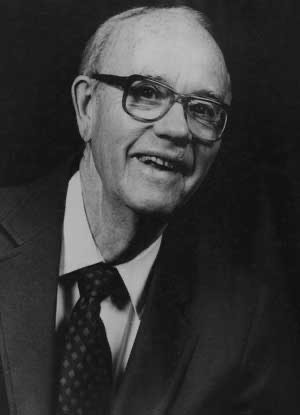
- Born: James Franklin Comstock; 25 February 1911; Richwood, West Virginia
- Died: May 22, 1996 (aged 85); Huntington, West Virginia
- Education: Marshall University (1934)
- Occupations: writer, newspaper publisher and humorist

James Franklin Comstock (25 February 1911, Richwood, West Virginia - 22 May 1996, Huntington, West Virginia) was a West Virginia writer, newspaper publisher and humorist. He founded the weekly West Virginia Hillbilly (1957-1980) and compiled a definitive 51-volume encyclopedia of West Virginia history and culture.

== Biography ==
After completing high school locally, Comstock graduated from Marshall College (now University) (B.A., English) in 1934. An aspiring journalist, he found himself teaching high school English in his home town from 1938 to 1942. With the outbreak of war, he sought employment in the military industry. Finding the manufacture of gun barrels boring, however, he joined the U.S. Navy as a lieutenant and was assigned to decoding messages on Guam (1944-1946). Returning to civilian life, he worked for a time as a correspondent for the Clarksburg [West Virginia] Exponent Telegram before starting his own weekly newspaper. In 1946 he co-founded The [Richwood] News Leader with Bronson McClung (a former pupil).

Comstock devoted 20 years (1957-1977) to compiling the West Virginia Heritage Encyclopedia which included original content as well as reprinting long out-of-print material by and about West Virginians. He led a campaign to preserve the house in Hillsboro, West Virginia, where Pearl S. Buck, the Nobel Prize-winning novelist, was born. Comstock assisted with the financing of the rescue of the historic Cass Scenic Railroad. He also started the Mountain State Press to publish books of West Virginia interest.

=== The West Virginia Hillbilly ===
In 1957 Comstock and McClung established The West Virginia Hillbilly, which became a celebrated repository of Appalachian folklore, heritage and humor. Comstock characterized his publication as “A newspaper for people who can't read, edited by an editor who can't write”. Comstock’s regular column was christened “The Comstock Lode”. Circulation for the weekly peaked around 30,000 in the 1960s and ‘70s, with many readers subscribing from outside West Virginia. Comstock's West Virginia Heritage Foundation supported the publication and distribution of seven volumes (over six years) of West Virginia Heritage (1967-72) drawn from the periodical, including both reprinted and original material.

A 2016 tribute published in The Paris Review, asserted that “The Hillbilly wasn’t just a paper—it was an art project, a platform for historic preservation, a conservative wailing wall, and, above all, an exploration of the West Virginian id.” The paper's run ended in 1980.

Comstock died at St. Mary's Hospital in Huntington, West Virginia at age 85.

== Works ==
- Pa and Ma and Mister Kennedy (1965)
- Pa and Ma and Fiddlin' Clyde (1965)
- West Virginia Heritage, Compiled from West Virginia Hillbilly material by Jim Comstock and Bronson McClung; Richwood, West Virginia: West Virginia Heritage Foundation.
  - Volume 1 (1967)
  - Volume 2 (1968)
  - Volume 3 (1969)
  - Volume 4 (1970)
  - Volume 5 (1971)
  - Volume 6 (1972)
  - Volume 7 (1972)
- Best of "Hillbilly": A Prize Collection of 100-Proof writing from Jim Comstock's "West Virginia Hillbilly" (1969), edited by Otto Whittaker.
- 'Ritin' and Railin' by Brooks Pepper (1973; edited by Comstock)
- Good News the Life of Jesus Reported in Newspaper Style (1974)
- West Virginia Heritage Encyclopedia; 51 vol. [Exclusive run of 3,000 sets; never reprinted] (1974-1976).
  - Volume 1 – A to Atkinson
  - Volume 2 – Atkinson to Black
  - Volume 3 – Black, Louis to Bruce, Barton
  - Volume 4 – Bruce, C.H.R. to Centennial Catalogue
  - Volume 5 – Centennial Catalogue to Coppiniger
  - Volume 6 – Copsy, John to Diss Debar
  - Volume 7 – Diss Debar to First Sawmill
  - Volume 8 – First Sawmill to Garnett, Gen.
  - Volume 9 – Garnett, William to Greenbrier County
  - Volume 10 – Greenbrier County to Hays Creek
  - Volume 11 – Haythe, Ray to Iron Furnace
  - Volume 12 – Iron Furnace to Laidly, John
  - Volume 13 – Laidley, William Sidney to Mann, Isaac
  - Volume 14 – Manning, Andrew Johnson to Military Line
  - Volume 15 – Military Telegraph to Morris, Benjamin
  - Volume 16 – Morris, Benjamin to Ohio Valley
  - Volume 17 – Ohio Valley College to Pocahontas Times
  - Volume 18 – Pocahontas Trail to Reuther, Walter
  - Volume 19 – Reuther, Walter to Schaffer, Owens
  - Volume 20 – Schaie, Klaus Warner to Staats Mill
  - Volume 21 – Stacey, Arthur E. to Traubert, Charles Herbert
  - Volume 22 – Travel Councils to Werner, Harry Rupert
  - Volume 23 – Werner, William Lewis to Women's Reformatory
  - Volume 24 – Woo, George to Young, Ivan E
  - Volume 25 – Bibliography
  - Supplemental series:
    - Volume 1 - Hardesty's Monroe, Putnam and Tyler Counties
    - Volume 2 – Hardesty's Doddridge, Marion, Upshur, and Wetzel Counties
    - Volume 3 - Hardesty's Calhoun, Pocahontas, Braxton and Berkeley Counties
    - Volume 4 – Hardesty's Jackson, Kanawha, and Barbour Counties
    - Volume 5 - Hardesty's Mason, Pleasants, Lewis, and Roane Counties
    - Volume 6 – Hardesty's Harrison, Cabell, Wirt, and Greenbrier Counties
    - Volume 7 - Hardesty's Gilmer, Ritchie, Lincoln and Wayne Counties
    - Volume 8 - Hardesty's Wood and Jefferson Counties
    - Volume 9 – The Soldiery of West Virginia
    - Volume 10 – Historical Records Survey, West Virginia
    - Volume 11 – West Virginia, A Guide to the Mountain State (1st ed. 1941, Oxford University Press; Writers' Program of the WPA in the State of West Virginia.)
    - Volume 12 – The Border Settlers of Northwestern Virginia from 1768-1795 Embracing the Life of Jesse Hughes and Other Noted Scouts of the Great Woods of the Trans-Allegheny, by Lucullus Virgil McWhorter (Part 1)
    - Volume 13 – The Border Settlers... (Part 2)
    - Volume 14 – Commonplace Book (A collection of articles on diverse topics, from Civil War Gen. Rosecranz to West Virginia theater)
    - Volume 15 – A Forrest Hull Sampler
    - Volume 16 - Shirley Donnelly Sampler
    - Volume 17 - A History of the Valley of Virginia, by Samuel Kercheval
    - Volume 18 – History and Government of West Virginia, by Virgil A. Lewis
    - Volume 19 – Stories and Verse of West Virginia (Part 1; 1st ed. 1925) by Ella May Turner
    - Volume 20 – Porte Crayon Sampler
    - Volume 21 – Pages from the Past..., by George W. Summers
    - Volume 22 - West Virginia People and Places by Charles Carpenter
    - Volume 23 – West Virginia Songbag
    - Volume 24 – Stories and Verse of West Virginia (Part 2; companion and homage to Turner's book)
    - Volume 25 – West Virginia Women
    - Volume 51 – West Virginia Picture Book
- Sixty Years on the Great Kanawha and other Rivers (The Life of Captain Harry White) (1976) by Jim Comstock
- 7 Decades: An Autobiography of a Kind (1982)

== Humor ==
- In 1947, Comstock founded the “University of Hard Knocks”, an honorary society with a mission to recognize people who have made a success of their life without the benefit of higher education. Alderson Broaddus College in Philippi, West Virginia sponsored the organization, which moved its offices to the A-B campus in 1976. The society was dissolved in 2014.
- In 1957, Comstock perpetrated an elaborate hoax involving the use of a captive mountain lion, to convince rival editor Calvin Price of neighboring Pocahontas County that these animals still existed in West Virginia. (After the exposé, he arranged for it to live out its retirement at the French Creek Game Farm, a state-run zoo.)
- In a notorious episode of pranksterism, Comstock once printed an issue of The News Leader using ink admixed with the juice of the ramp, the storied wild onion that abounds in the state in the spring. The intolerable stench at the local post office prompted the postmaster to extract a promise that he would never do it again.
- Comstock embarked upon a facetious political campaign in 1964, running for U.S. Congress as the Republican candidate from the Third District in West Virginia, then an impossibly Democratic stronghold. He opposed “motherhood” among other things, and lost to incumbent John M. Slack Jr., failing even to carry his home precinct.
- The masthead of The West Virginia Hillbilly announced its publication as ‘‘weakly’’.
- Comstock bragged that of Richwood’s 3,000 residents, only 19 maintained Hillbilly subscriptions.
- When a “slick” New York magazine referred to the Hillbilly as a “sophisticated” newspaper, Comstock demanded a retraction.
