= Kanawha State Forest =

State Forest in Kanawha County, West Virginia

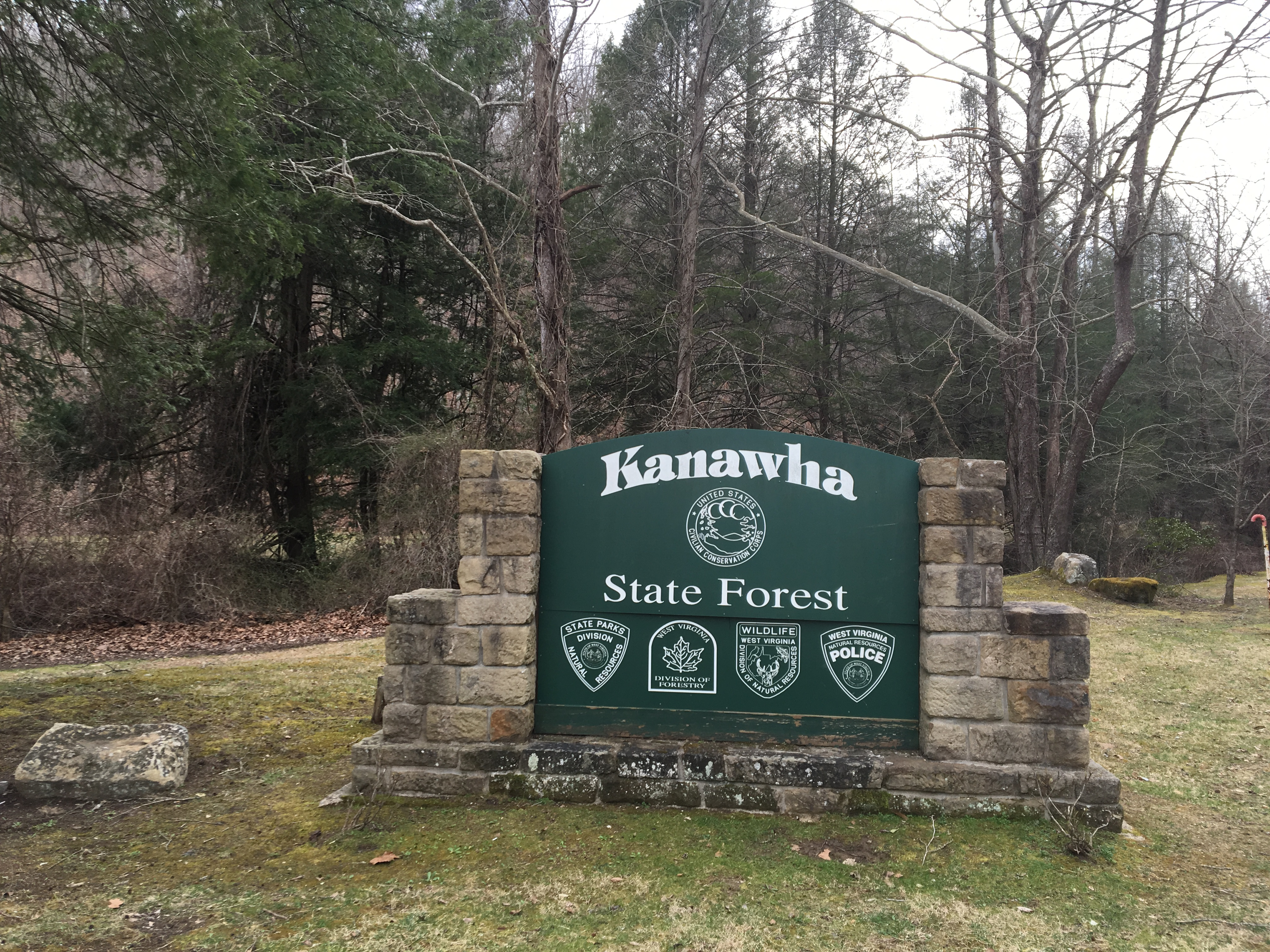
- Kanawha State Forest sign

- Location within West Virginia
- Location: Kanawha, West Virginia, United States
- Coordinates: 38°16′53″N 81°38′30″W
- Area: 9,300 acres (38 km^{2})
- Elevation: 741 ft (226 m)
- Website: wvstateparks.com/park/kanawha-state-forest/
- Kanawha State Forest
- U.S. National Register of Historic Places
- U.S. Historic district
- Location: South of Charleston, West Virginia
- Area: 1,503.67 acres (608.51 ha)
- Built: 1938-1940
- Built by: Civilian Conservation Corps
- NRHP reference No.: 93000228
- Added to NRHP: March 25, 1993

Kanawha State Forest is a 9,300-acre (38 km^{2}) recreation area located near the community of Loudendale, West Virginia, which is about 7 miles (11 km) from downtown Charleston, West Virginia, United States. It is managed by the West Virginia Department of Natural Resources.

While still classified as a "state forest", the West Virginia Legislature has directed that the facility be managed as a state park.

The Davis Creek Road entrance to Kanawha State Forest is located at 38°16′53″N 81°38′30″W (38.28133, -81.64169).

Recreational facilities include overnight camping, picnicking, hiking, a public shooting-range, mountain biking, cross-country skiing and a swimming pool and playground. Several geocaches are located in the forest.

The central portion of Kanawha State Forest, and its historic structures were listed on the National Register of Historic Places on March 25, 1993.

== See also ==
- List of West Virginia state forests
