= Lobelia, West Virginia =

- Unincorporated community
- Location within West Virginia Location within the United States
- Coordinates: 38°08′01″N 80°17′40″W
- Country: United States
- State: West Virginia
- County: Pocahontas
- Elevation: 2,503 ft (763 m)
- Time zone: UTC-5 (Eastern (EST))
  - Summer (DST): UTC-4 (EDT)
- Area codes: 304 & 681
- GNIS feature ID: 1551907

Lobelia is an unincorporated community in Pocahontas County, West Virginia, United States. Lobelia is 4.5 miles (7.2 km) west of Hillsboro.

The community was named after the Lobelia flowers near the original town site.

== Geography ==
Hills Creek and Bruffey Creek are located near Lobelia. Their associated sinks constitute the Hills-Bruffey cave system.

== See also ==
- List of ghost towns in West Virginia
