= Brooks Memorial Arboretum =

Arboretum in West Virginia

Coordinates: 38°07′21″N 80°09′41″W

- Interactive map of Brooks Memorial Arboretum
- Type: Arboretum
- Location: Watoga State Park, Hillsboro, West Virginia

Brooks Memorial Arboretum is an arboretum located in the 10,100 acre Watoga State Park, Hillsboro, West Virginia.

The arboretum, which covers the drainage of Two Mile Run, has trails up the hollow and on both ridges surrounding it. It contains mature yellow poplars, Ohio buckeyes, cottonwoods, and other native species.

== See also ==
- List of botanical gardens and arboretums in West Virginia
