= Sunshine Farm and Gardens =

Botanic garden and nursery in West Virginia

Coordinates: 38°03′48″N 80°26′01″W

Sunshine Farm and Gardens (60 acres) is an Arboretum, Botanic Garden, garden center, retail and wholesale nursery located at 3,650 feet (1,110 m) altitude near Falling Spring / Renick, Greenbrier County West Virginia. It is open to the public.

The gardens contain over 10,000 different varieties of perennials, bulbs, trees and shrubs. One of the main focuses is a breeding program, breeding new varieties in the genus Helleborus, with 6 acres (24,000 m^{2}) of the nursery devoted to more than 168,000 hellebores. The other main focus is on the cultivation and propagation of east coast native plants with several acres dedicated to woodland perennials and wildflowers.

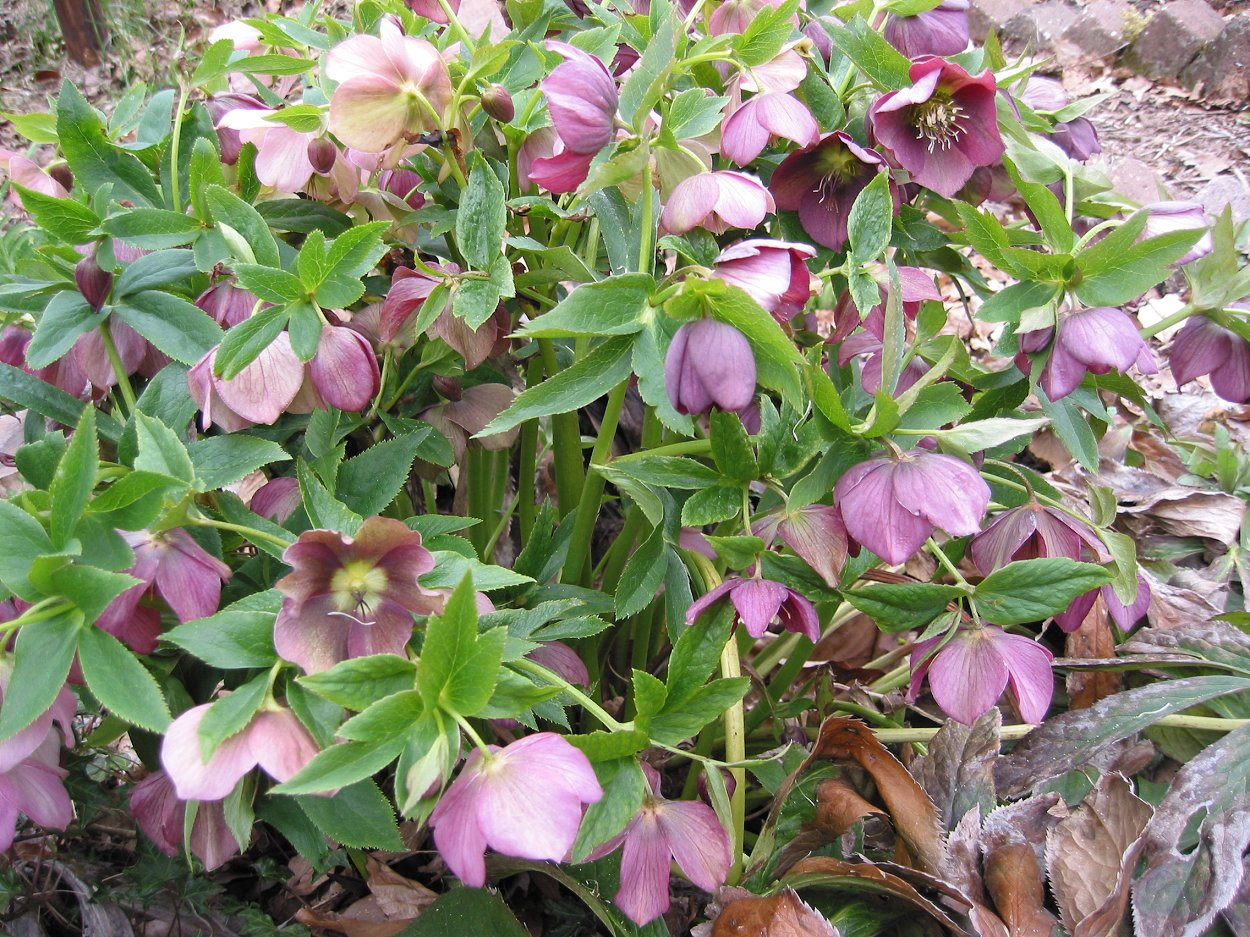
Sunshine Farm and Gardens

== See also ==
- List of botanical gardens and arboretums in West Virginia
