= School of Life (disambiguation) =

School of Life may refer to:

- School of Life, a 2005 television drama
- School of Life (2003 film), a 2003 comedy
- Life School, a charter school in Lancaster, Texas, US
- The School of Life, a UK-based global organisation which teaches "emotional skills"

== See also ==
- School of Hard Knocks (disambiguation)
