= Panther Wildlife Management Area =

State Wildlife Management Area in McDowell County, West Virginia

- IUCN category IV (habitat/species management area)
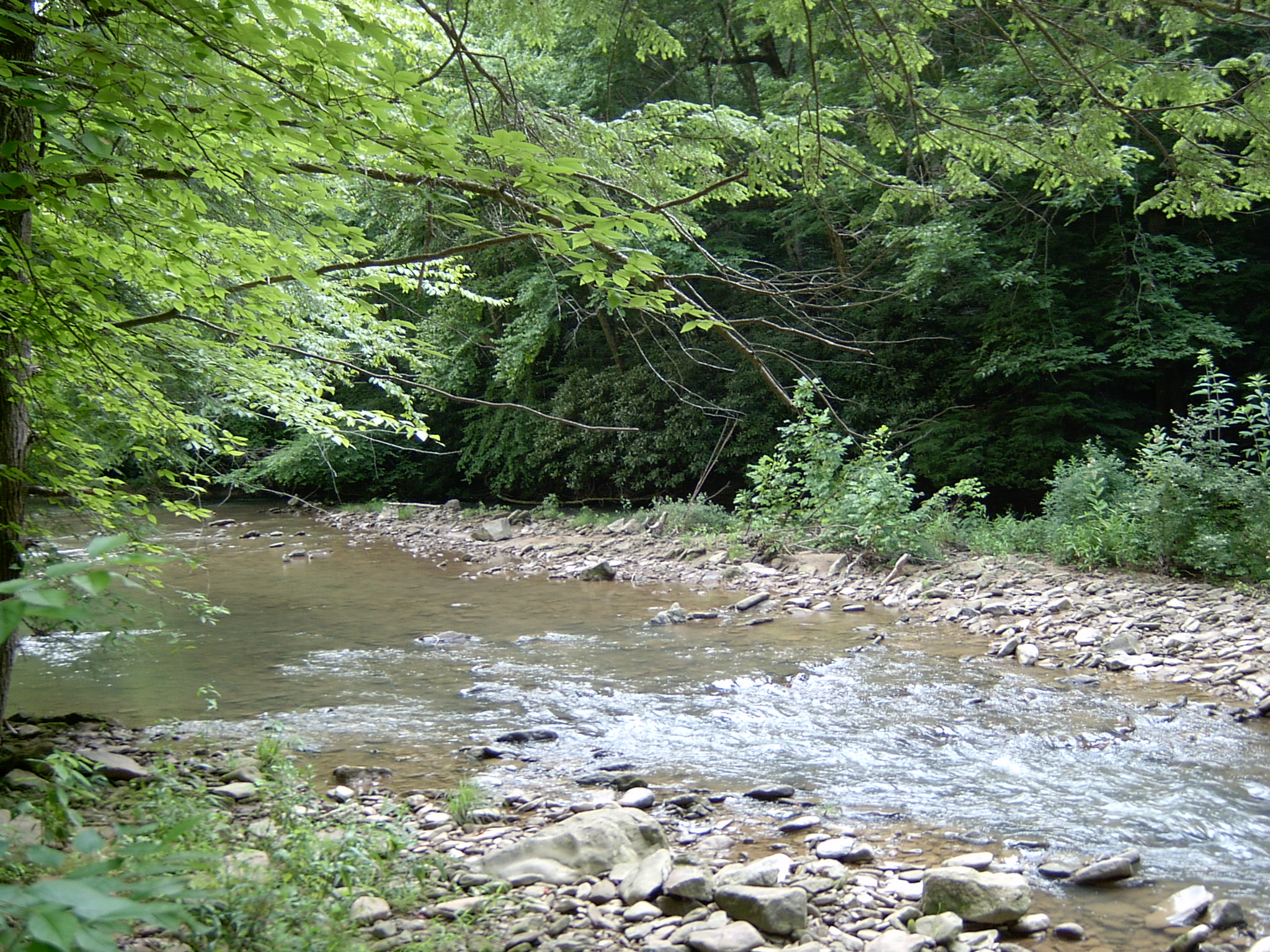
- Panther Creek

- Location within West Virginia
- Location: McDowell, West Virginia, United States
- Coordinates: 37°25′24″N 81°52′35″W
- Area: 7,820 acres (31.6 km^{2})
- Elevation: 1,650 ft (500 m)
- Website: wvstateparks.com/park/panther-state-forest/

Panther Wildlife Management Area, located along Panther Creek in southwestern McDowell County, West Virginia. It is 7,820 acres (3,160 ha) in size.
