= Droop Mountain Battlefield State Park =

State Park in Pocahontas County, West Virginia

- IUCN category III (natural monument or feature)
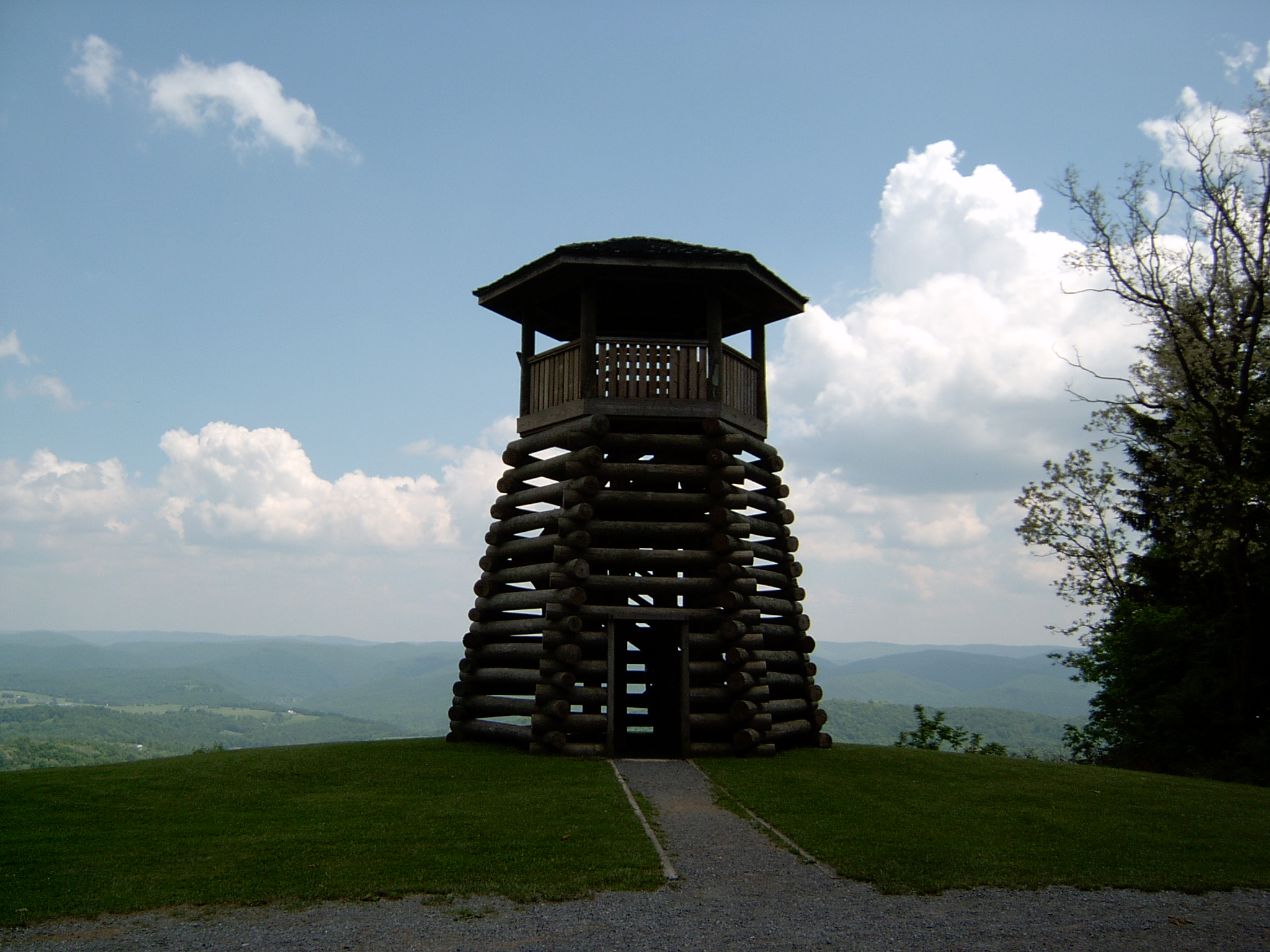
- Observation tower overlooking the Greenbrier River valley.

- Location within West Virginia
- Location: Pocahontas, West Virginia, United States
- Nearest town: Hillsboro, West Virginia
- Coordinates: 38°06′45″N 80°16′19″W
- Area: 287 acres (116 ha)
- Elevation: 3,104 ft (946 m)
- Established: July 4, 1928
- Named for: Battle of Droop Mountain
- Governing body: West Virginia Division of Natural Resources
- Website: wvstateparks.com/park/droop-mountain-battlefield-state-park/
- Droop Mountain Battlefield
- U.S. National Register of Historic Places
- Nearest city: Marlinton, West Virginia
- Coordinates: 38°6′36″N 80°16′20″W
- NRHP reference No.: 70000664
- Added to NRHP: January 26, 1970

Droop Mountain Battlefield State Park is a state park located on Droop Mountain in Pocahontas County, West Virginia. The park was the site of the Battle of Droop Mountain, the last major battle of the American Civil War in the state taking place on November 6, 1863. John D. Sutton, a West Virginia private in the Union Army at the battle, became the leader in the movement to create the park when he served in the West Virginia House of Delegates. Dedicated on July 4, 1928, Droop Mountain Battlefield became the first state park in West Virginia.

The battlefield was transformed into a historical, outdoor recreation area by the Civilian Conservation Corps during the Great Depression. Public reenactments of the battle have been conducted in October of some even-numbered years by the West Virginia Reenactors Association.

The park was placed on the National Register of Historic Places in 1970.

Droop Mountain Battlefield State Park is located about 25 miles (40 km) north of the Lewisburg exit of I-64 on U.S. Highway 219 and about 15 miles (24 km) south of Marlinton on US 219. The park is also near Beartown State Park and Watoga State Park.

== Features ==
- Droop Mountain Museum with battle artifacts
- Lookout Tower
- hiking
- Picnic areas with shelters
- Tots playgrounds

== Gallery ==
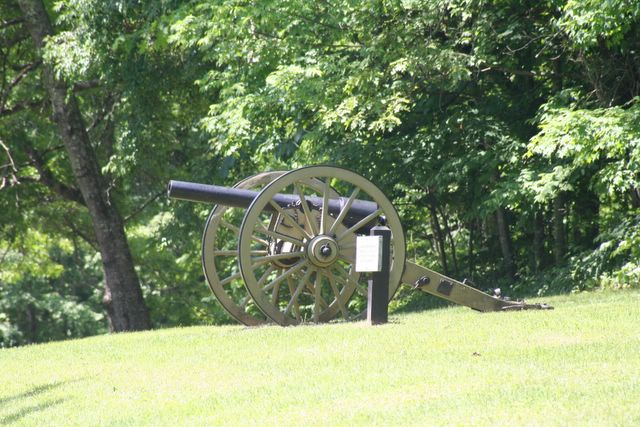
Cannon

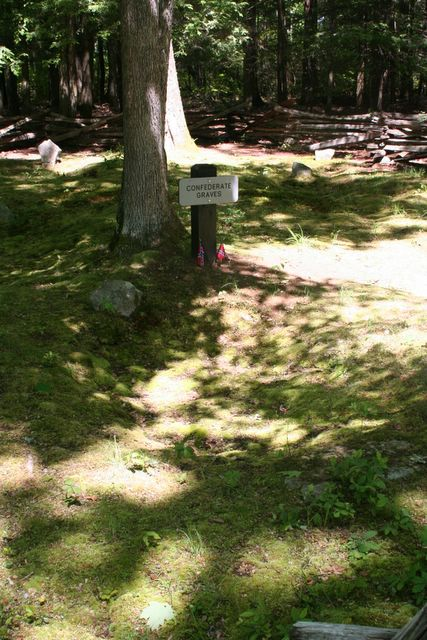
Confederate Graves

Log Cabin

== See also ==
- American Civil War
- Battle of Droop Mountain
- List of West Virginia state parks
- State park
- West Virginia in the American Civil War
