= Calvin Price State Forest =

State Forest in West Virginia, US

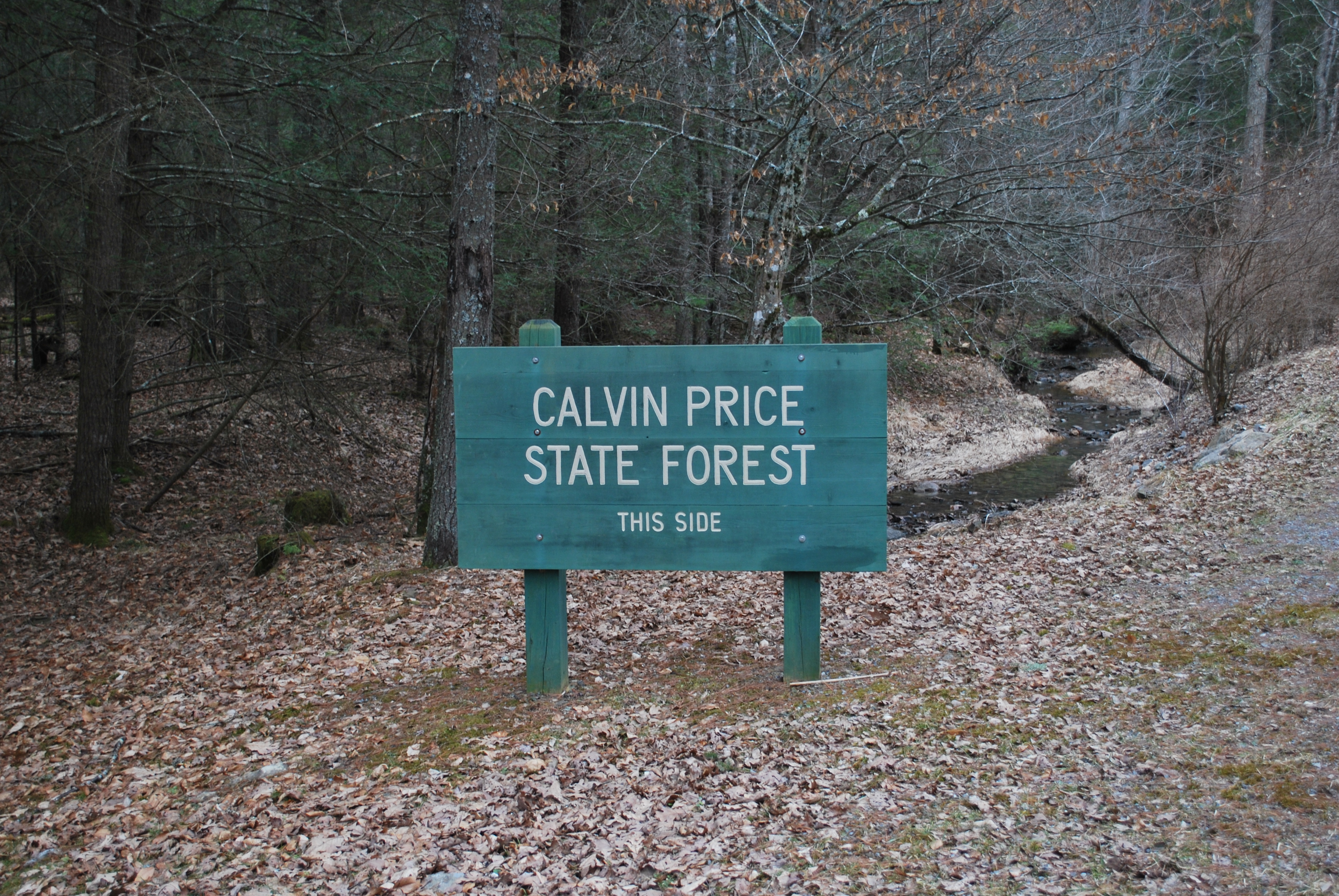
- Entrance sign for Calvin Price State Forest

- Location within West Virginia
- Location: West Virginia, United States
- Coordinates: 38°03′49″N 80°09′06″W
- Area: 9,482 acres (38.37 km^{2})
- Elevation: 2,730 ft (830 m)
- Established: 1953
- Named for: Calvin W. Price, editor of the Pocahontas Times newspaper
- Website: wvstateparks.com/park/calvin-price-state-forest/

Calvin Price State Forest is a 9,482-acre (38 km^{2}) state forest in eastern Pocahontas and Greenbrier counties, West Virginia. The forest is the newest in West Virginia's system, having been mostly purchased in 1953 from New River Lumber Company. The forest is named for Marlinton newspaper editor, Calvin W. Price.

The forest is located immediately adjacent to Watoga State Park, which itself was originally a state forest prior to 1934. Because of Watoga's proximity, Cal Price has not been extensively developed. There is a limited amount of primitive camping. Over two-thirds of Cal Price is only accessible by hiking.

Calvin Price is most easily accessible via Pocahontas County Route 21 (Beaver Creek Road) from Huntersville. For approximately 2 miles (3.2 km), CR 21 serves as the border between Watoga and Calvin Price. A series of signs mark each side of the roadway as hunting is permitted in Calvin Price, while it is not in Watoga.
