= Beartown State Park =

State Park in Greenbrier and Pocahontas counties, West Virginia

- IUCN category III (natural monument or feature)
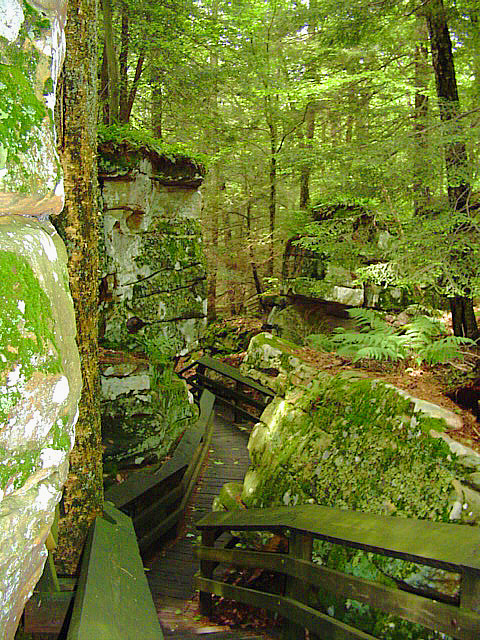
- The walkway at Beartown State Park.

- Location within West Virginia
- Location: West Virginia, United States
- Coordinates: 38°03′08″N 80°16′32″W
- Area: 110 acres (45 ha)
- Elevation: 3,425 ft (1,044 m)
- Established: 1970
- Named for: American black bear
- Governing body: West Virginia Division of Natural Resources
- Website: wvstateparks.com/park/beartown-state-park/

Beartown State Park is a 110-acre (45 ha) state park located on the eastern summit of Droop Mountain, 7 miles (11 km) southwest of Hillsboro, West Virginia, in northern Greenbrier County, West Virginia (with a small portion of the park also located in Pocahontas County). The land was purchased in 1970 with funds from the Nature Conservancy and a donation from Mrs. Edwin G. Polan, in memory of her son, Ronald Keith Neal, a local soldier who was killed in the Vietnam War. Development of the park has been minimal in order to preserve the natural attractions of the area. Recreation in the park consists of hiking along improved trails and boardwalks. Markers explain the natural processes at work in the area. The name "Beartown State Park" was chosen because local residents claimed that many cave-like openings in the rocks made ideal winter dens for the native black bears, the state animal of West Virginia. Also because the many deep, narrow crevasses were formed in a regular criss-cross pattern which appear from above like the streets of a small town. Beartown is noted for its unusual rock formations, which consist of Droop, or Pottsville, Sandstone formed during the Pennsylvanian age. Massive boulders, overhanging cliffs and deep crevasses make up the beauty of the park. On the face of the cliffs are hundreds of eroded pits. These pits range from the size of a marble to others large enough to hold two grown men. It is not unusual to see ice and snow remaining in the deeper crevasses until midsummer.

The park is accessible via U.S. Highway 219, 7 miles (11 km) southwest of Hillsboro, West Virginia and is close to Droop Mountain Battlefield State Park and Watoga State Park.

The park is open daily from April to October. Access during the off-season is available by appointment. No fee is charged for admission to the park.

== Accessibility ==
Accessibility for the disabled was assessed by West Virginia University. The 2005 assessment found issues with the slipperiness of the boardwalk ramps and signage in the parking lot.

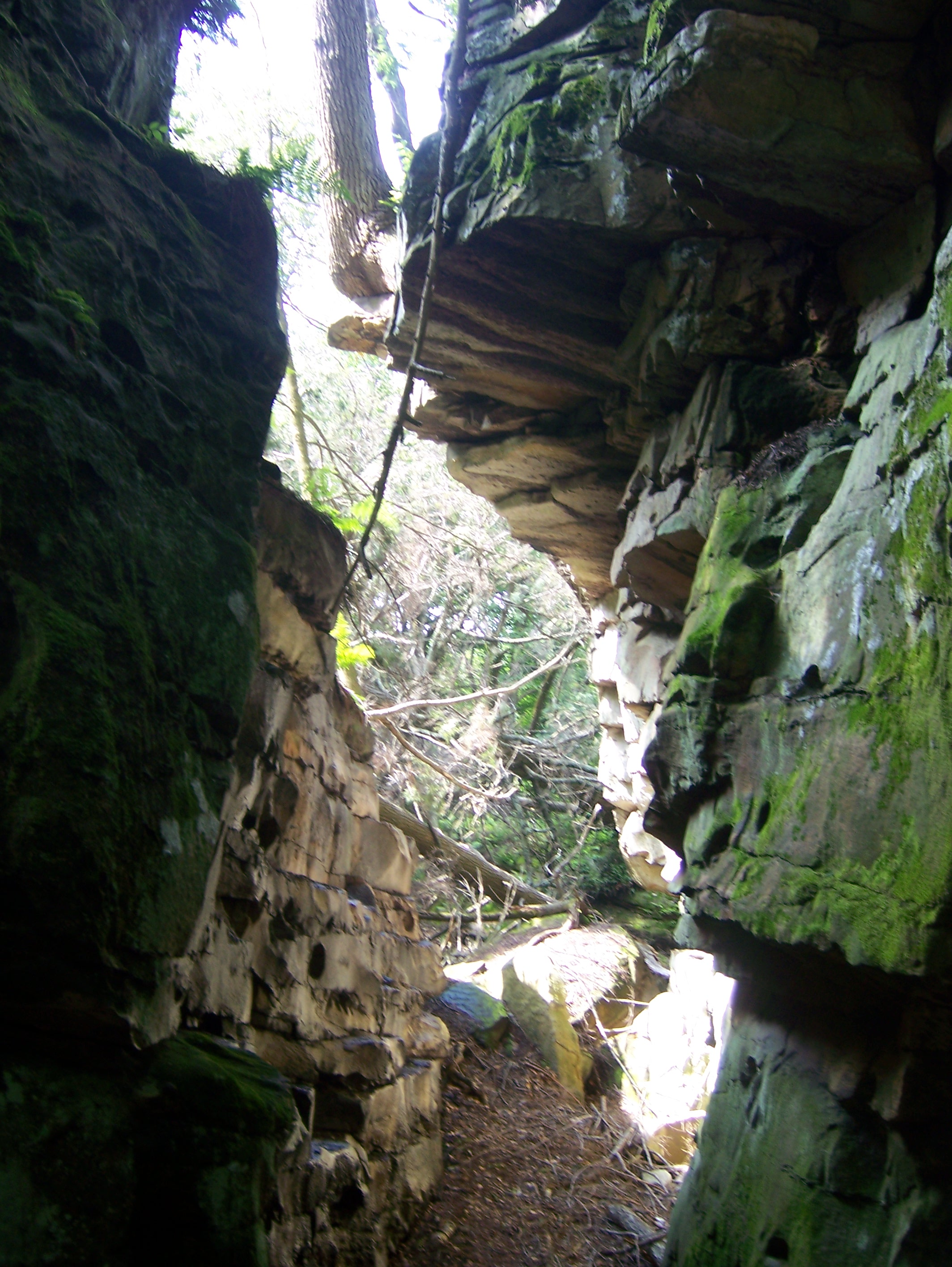
Canyons of Beartown SP

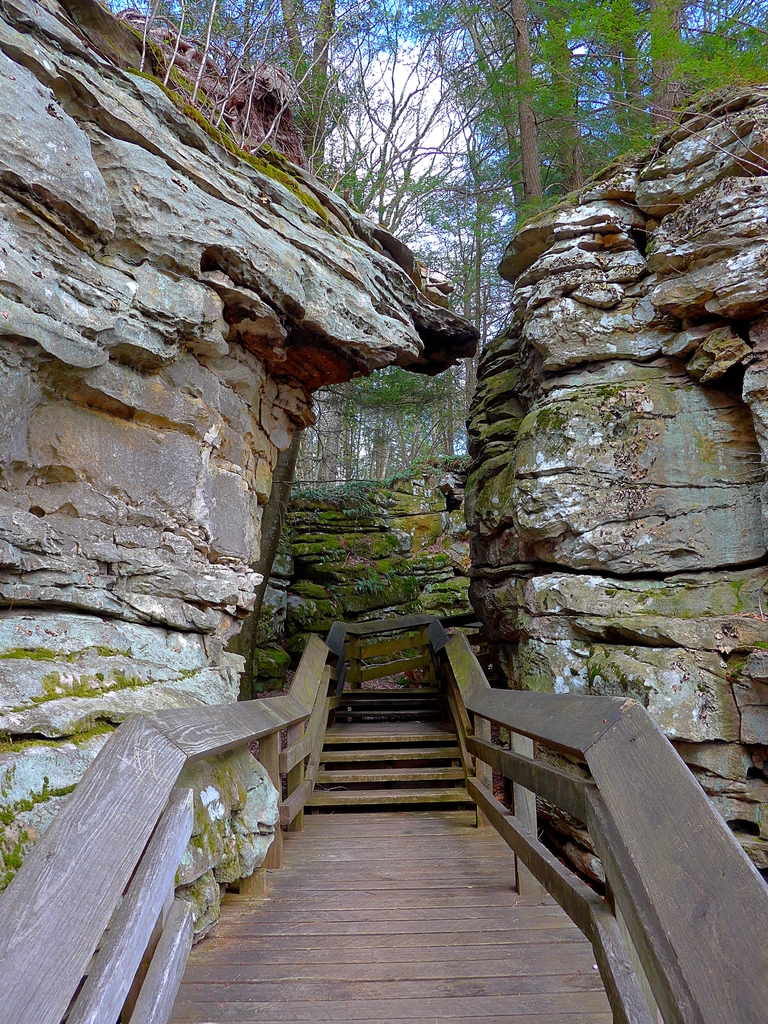
The rock passageway at Beartown

== See also ==
- List of West Virginia state parks
