= Pearl S. Buck Birthplace =

Historic house in West Virginia, United States

- Pearl Buck House
- U.S. National Register of Historic Places
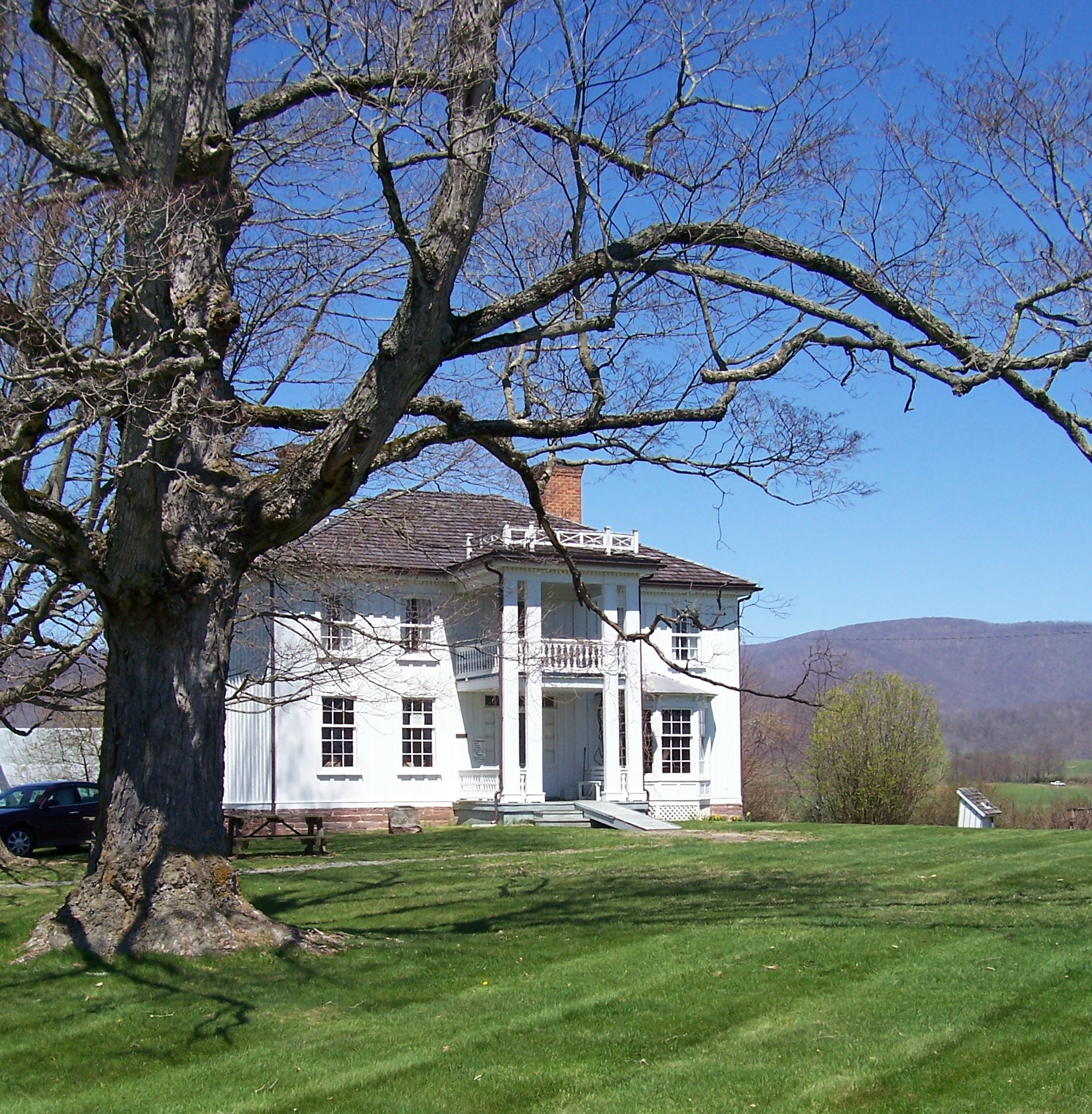
- The Pearl S. Buck Birthplace

- Location within West Virginia Location within the United States
- Location: 8129 Seneca Trail, Hillsboro, West Virginia
- Coordinates: 38°8′30″N 80°12′19″W
- Area: 16.4 acres (6.6 ha)
- Built: 1892
- NRHP reference No.: 70000663
- Added to NRHP: June 15, 1970

The Pearl S. Buck Birthplace is a historic home in Hillsboro, West Virginia where American writer Pearl S. Buck was born. The home now serves as a museum offering guided tours. The site also includes a carpentry shop and barn with over 100 historic farm and woodworking tools, and the log home of Buck's father's family, the Sydenstrickers, which was moved from Greenbrier County.

== History ==
Built around 1875, the three-story home was constructed by hand by a Dutch refugee family escaping religious persecution in the Netherlands. Buck was born at the house in 1892 while her parents, Caroline Stulting and Absalom Sydenstricker, were on leave from Presbyterian missionary work in China. They returned to China three months after her birth.

Pearl S. Buck was the first American woman to win both the Pulitzer Prize (1932, for The Good Earth) and the Nobel Prize for Literature (1938). A world-renowned author, she wrote over 100 books and hundreds of short stories and magazine articles. Her books have been translated into 69 foreign languages.

== Preservation and current use ==
Buck herself was heavily involved in the preservation and restoration of the house. In the book My Mother's House she shared her vision for the museum:

If it (the house) ever lives again, and God grant it may for my Mother's memory, I hope it will live a new life, not for myself or for my family but for people. I would like it to belong to everyone who cares to go there. From that home has come so much life - that it ought never to die or fall into ruin. For my ancestors, it provided shelter and home in a new land, a house where they lived their new lives with traditional dignity... For my mother, it provided a home, living forever in her thought and memory, though she made dwelling places in a far country. For me it is a living heart in the country I knew was my own but which was strange to me until I returned to the house where I was born. For me that house was a gateway to America. May it live again, my Mother's house, and may it prove for others, too, a gateway to new thoughts and dreams and ways of life.

The house is available for public tours.

The site was placed on the National Register of Historic Places on June 15, 1970.

=== Manuscripts ===
Pearl Buck gave her valuable manuscript collection to the Birthplace Foundation in 1970. The collection (minus The Good Earth, which was missing at the time) was acquired in 1974 and is presently stored at West Virginia Wesleyan College, under a special arrangement made with Senator John D. Rockefeller IV, then President of the college. The manuscripts will remain there until suitable housing is built at the Birthplace. They are available to researchers with permission from the foundation.

=== The Stulting House ===
The Stulting family, Pearl Buck's maternal ancestors, moved from Utrecht, the Netherlands, in 1847 with 300 of their friends and relatives so that they might practice their religion freely during a time of religious intolerance in the Netherlands. They were forced to leave the land they loved and move to a strange new country. The party consisted of Cornelius Stulting (called "Mynheer" in Pearl Buck's books), his wife Arnolda, and their five married sons and their families—three generations.

Upon arrival in New York, the families and friends began to go their own ways. The Stultings moved to West Virginia, then still a part of Virginia, and purchased land. After first settling in Dutch Bottom, they bought a small farmland of 16 acres (65,000 m^{2}), of which the Pearl S. Buck Birthplace Foundation now owns 13 1/2 acres. It is located in the area commonly referred to as "Little Levels," surrounding the town of Hillsboro in Pocahontas County, West Virginia.

Pearl S. Buck's great grandfather, Cornelius "Mynheer" Stulting, had a yearning to build a house like the one they had in the Netherlands. His wife, Arnolda, was homesick, and he hoped that the new house would help her accept living in America more easily.

The Stulting men worked very hard and all supplies for building were taken from the land. They worked more than two years and the house was nearly completed when Cornelius "Mynheer" took a chill and became very ill. He died before seeing the house completed. The house was finally finished by Hermanus, Pearl Buck's grandfather, and his son, Cornelius John, with the knowledge and fine craftsmanship they had learned from their ancestors, and the family moved into the house: "There at the edge of the settlement they built it, a goodly, twelve room house of wood, with smooth floors and plastered and paper wall, a city house" (The Exile, 29–30).

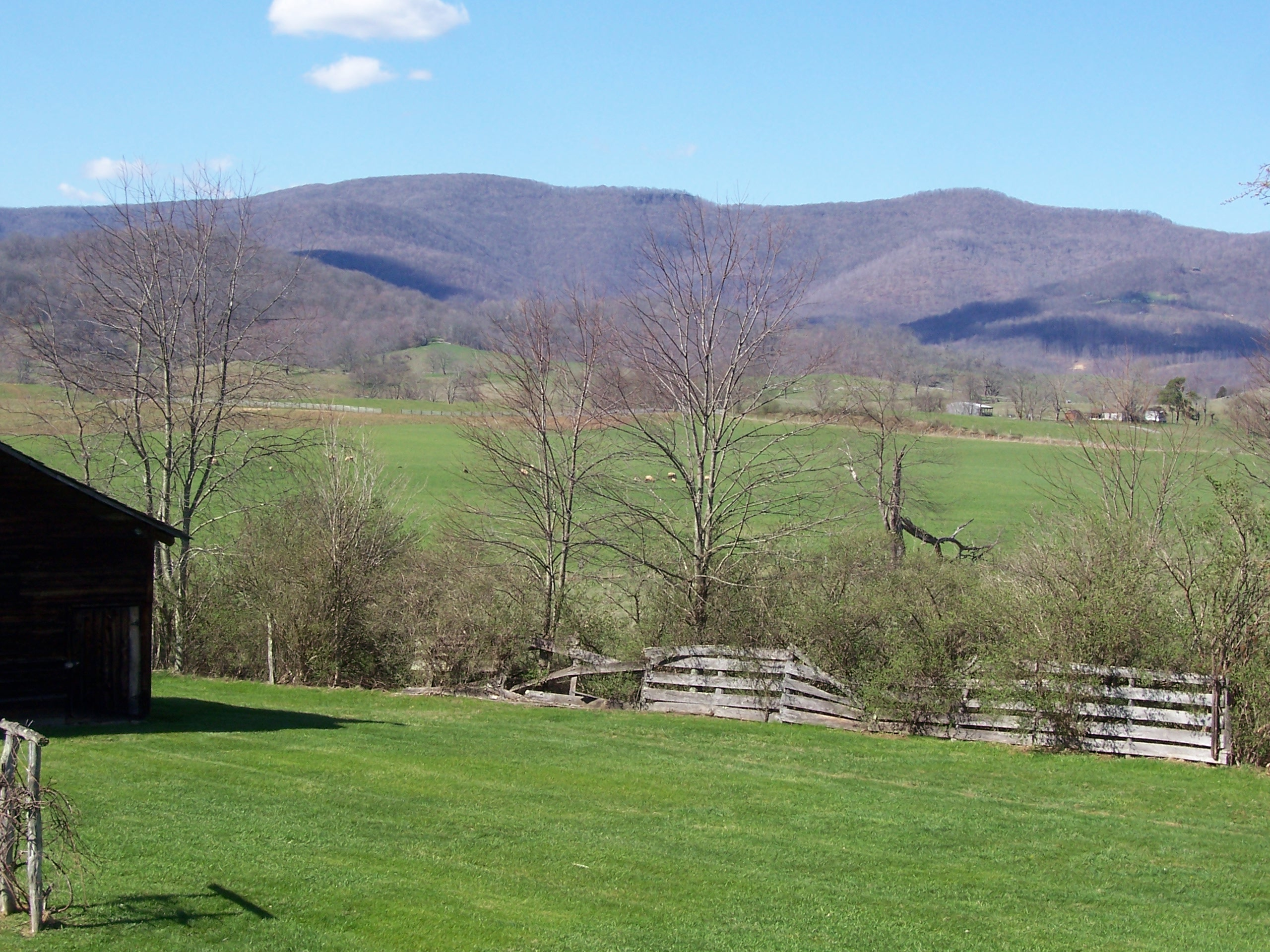
The Stulting property

Pearl Buck's mother, Caroline, often called "Carrie," was reared in this house. She married Absalom Sydenstricker, one of the nine children of Andrew and Frances Coffman Sydenstricker of Ronceverte, West Virginia. Shortly after their marriage, they left for China to become missionaries. "They were pioneer missionaries and worked in more than a dozen places in China. Sometimes no other white family lived in their town" (My Mother's House, 35).

The Sydenstrickers visited this home frequently on their furloughs, which were usually every nine years, and it was during one of these visits that Pearl Comfort Sydenstricker was born in her grandfather's home on June 26, 1892.

Since her childhood was spent in China, Pearl's visits here enlarged her love for this American home, which her mother had instilled in her with many stories.

The Stulting family enjoyed and taught music, practiced its fine craftsmanship, became school teachers, raised children, and shared joys and sorrows together in the house until 1922. Mr. George P. Edgar then bought the house and made it a winter home for his family until the early 1960s.

Then the home was purchased by Mr. Jim Comstock to preserve it for its historical value. After raising about $4,000 from the West Virginia Hillbilly newspaper readers, he asked the West Virginia Federation of Women's Clubs to take over the purchase. The purchase and restoration were made possible by the donations of clubwomen across the state.

=== The Stulting Barn ===
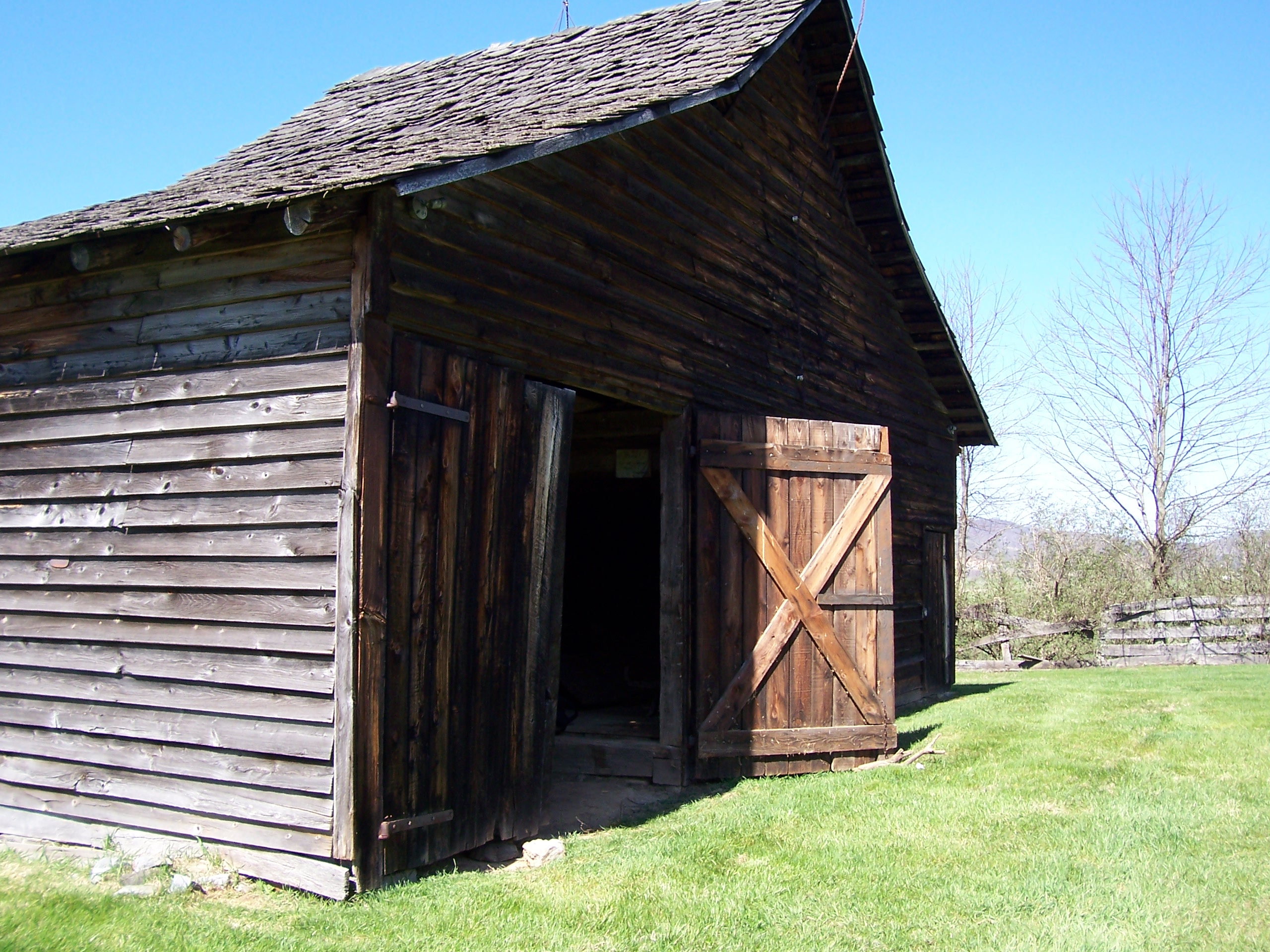
The restored Stulting barn

Although the Stulting family had not had any experience as farmers before coming to America, it managed to make a living on this small farm. The barn as it existed in the early 1970s had "grown" with additions, so it was restored to its 1892 state with a grant from the U.S. Department of the Interior and was completed in 1977. It has been placed on the National Register of Historic Places.

According to research undertaken during the restoration, the inner structure that served as the foundation for the restoration dates to the mid-to-late 1860s. The nails used to hold the weatherboarding in place may be dated at approximately 1830 to 1890. This siding contained vertical saw marks which were uniform indicating the use of an up and down action power saw which may have been water powered. This would date the siding at about 1830 to about 1860—prior to circular saw use for the area. The structural framing details also fit this period of dating, about 1830 to 1860. Structural research indicates that the barn was built with the sheds all at one time.

Today, this barn with its antique farm implements and equipment, with a hayloft, stalls, and raised storage area, lacks only the farm animals to make it typical of the 1892 era.

=== The Sydenstricker House ===
This house was a gift to the Birthplace Foundation from two sisters, Mrs. Lucille Spencer, of Richwood, and Mrs. Leona Bonin, who lived in it before building a new home on the Sydenstricker farm. The house was moved from its original site and rebuilt in Hillsboro.

The Sydenstricker house was the birthplace of Pearl's father, Dr. Absalom Sydenstricker, Presbyterian missionary to China for his entire adult life. The original log section is a museum for Sydenstricker items and the period 1834–1880. The house was built in 1834 by Andrew Sydenstricker, who married Frances Coffman on January 16, 1834, and became the father of nine children, including Absalom. Five of Andrew's sons became ministers, four Presbyterian and one Methodist.

The Sydenstricker family was very prominent in Greenbrier County. Philip Sydenstricker, great-great-grandfather of Pearl S. Buck, came to America from Bavaria (Germany) -- first to Pennsylvania, then on to West Virginia ("Virginia" at the time) after the Revolutionary War, settling on a farm near Ronceverte, Greenbrier County, in what is known as the Fort Springs area. He arrived in America by ship on September 26, 1764.

The original two-story section of the house was built of logs, and later covered with siding to match the additional part of the house, which was added as the family grew. The siding was removed in the reconstruction of the house.

Reconstruction was begun with a $15,000 grant from the West Virginia Bicentennial Committee. The grant enabled the Birthplace Foundation to dismantle the house, transport the building materials to Hillsboro, and to put in the foundation. An additional $12,000 was invested in it from contributions for this purpose. A grant from the Claude Worthington Benedum Foundation of $25,000 has enabled it to be completed in 1982. The Pearl Buck Birthplace Foundation seeks donated items for this house, especially Sydenstricker memorabilia and furniture.

=== Pearl S. Buck Memorial Garden ===
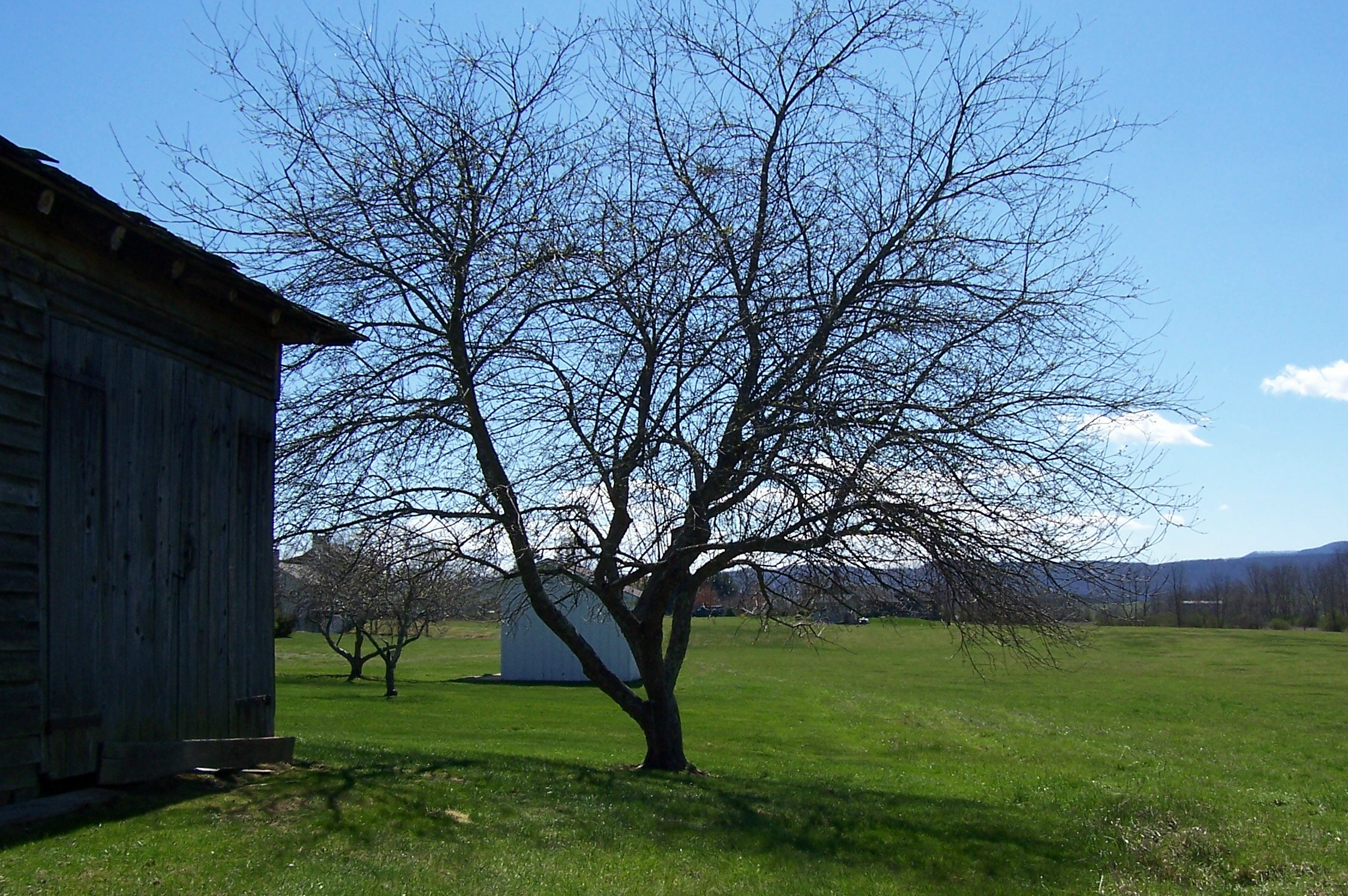
Tree on the property of the Pearl S. Buck birthplace

The Birthplace farm is being developed into a Memorial Garden honoring Pearl. The project was started by Greenbrier District, West Virginia Garden Clubs, when a fruit orchard was restored with old-fashioned trees of the period. Also, grape vines and flowers were planted where the Stultings had originally planted them.

A few trees on the ground were originally planted by the Stultings, including a stately old Chinese mulberry tree which until recently stood in front of the house by the right. It had been brought as a seedling from China by Pearl Buck's missionary parents. Several other mulberry trees can still be seen on the property.

In The Exile, Pearl Buck wrote about her memory of the maple tree in front of the house: "There was an enormous old sugar maple to the left and there was a stile under it. Here many a time [Carrie] led her horse to mount it."

It was this same maple tree that Pearl Buck fondly referred to during a visit to her birthplace. She gazed beneath the tree and softly said, "I would like to be buried underneath that tree." But she qualified this by saying her children would make the final choice.

== Gallery ==
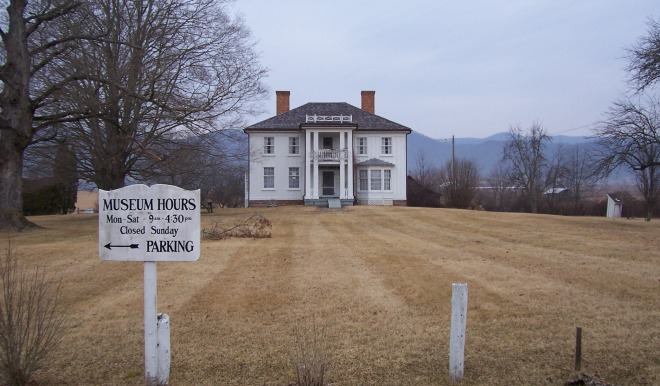
View of home

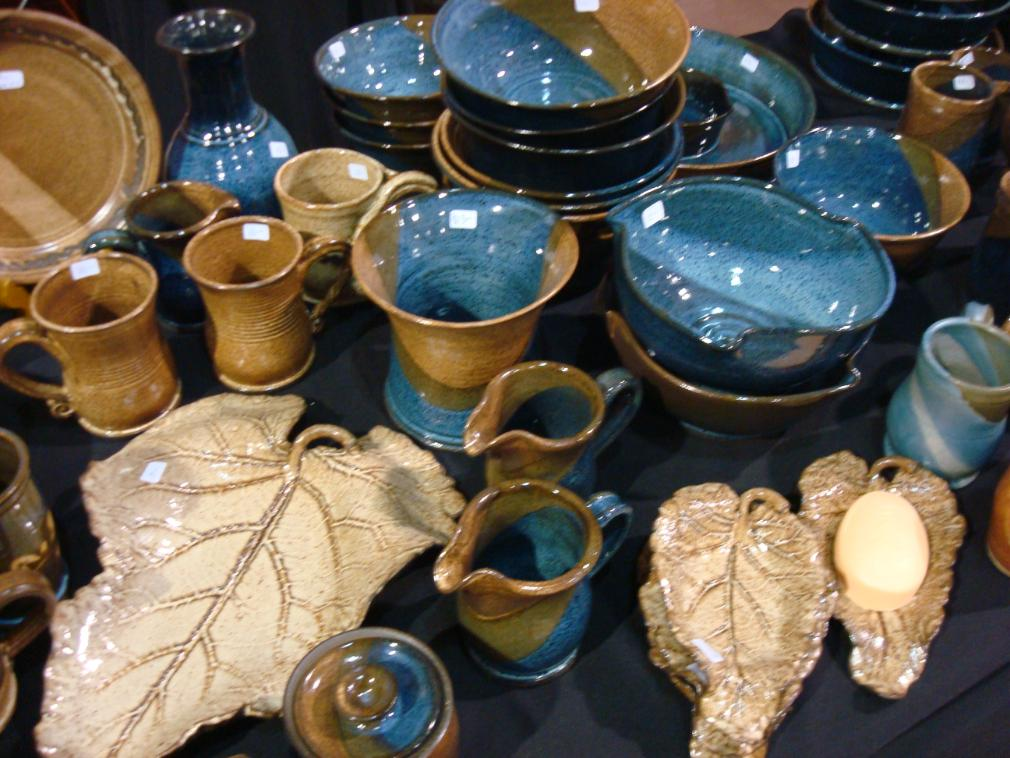
Heritage Fair

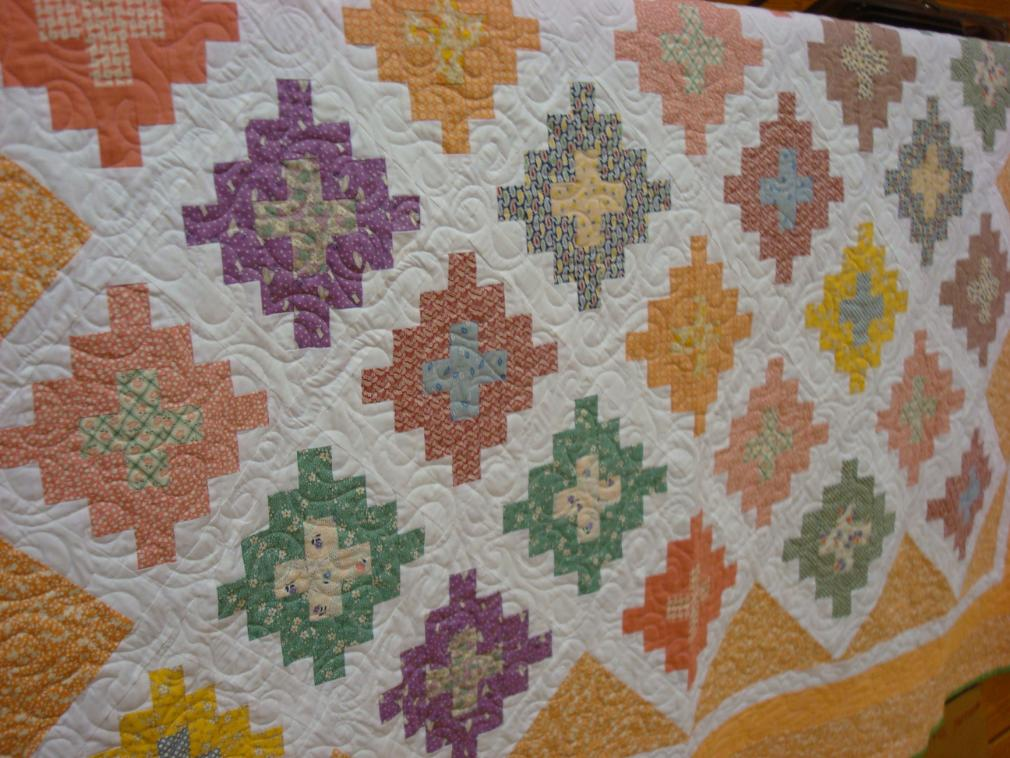
Heritage Fair

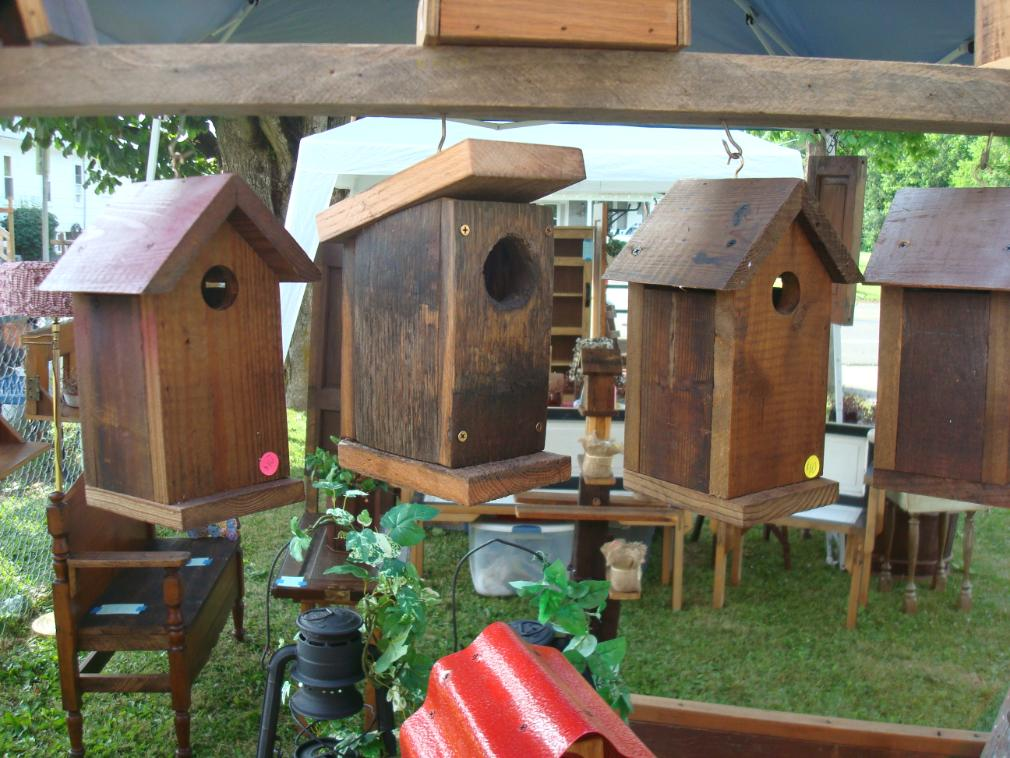
Heritage Fair
