= School of Hard Knocks =

Idiomatic phrase, the informal education from negative experiences

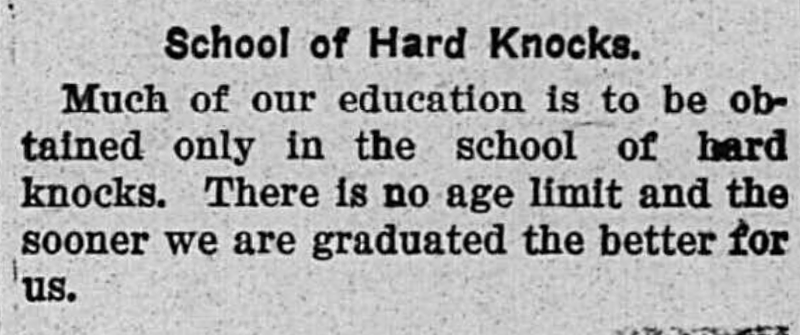
An item appearing in the Peninsula Enterprise newspaper about the "School of Hard Knocks" (1918)

The School of Hard Knocks (also referred to as the University of Life or University of Hard Knocks) is an idiomatic phrase referring to the inadvertent education one receives from negative experiences in life, often contrasted with formal education. The term originated in the United States; its earliest documented use was in 1870 in the book The Men Who Advertise:

"... his misfortunes were largely owing to the inexperience of youth. Trained, however, in the school of hard knocks, he now had learned the theory of success".

It is a phrase which is most typically used by a person to claim a level of wisdom imparted by life experience, which should be considered at least equal in merit to academic knowledge. It is a response that may be given when one is asked about their education, particularly if they do not have an extensive formal education but rather life experiences that should be valued instead. It may also be used facetiously, to suggest that formal education is not of practical value compared with "street" experience.

In the UK, Australia and New Zealand, the phrases "University of Life" and "School of Hard Knocks" may be used interchangeably.

In 1947, newspaperman James Franklin Comstock ("Jim" Comstock) founded the "University of Hard Knocks", an honorary society with a mission to recognize people who have made a success of their life without the benefit of higher education. Alderson Broaddus College in Philippi, West Virginia, US, sponsored the organization, which moved its offices to the A-B campus in 1976. The society was dissolved in 2014.

== See also ==
- Empiricism
- Practical knowledge
- Unschooling
- School of Life (disambiguation)
- Homeschooling
- Alternative education
