= Watoga State Park =

State park in Pocahontas County, West Virginia, USA

- IUCN category V (protected landscape/seascape)
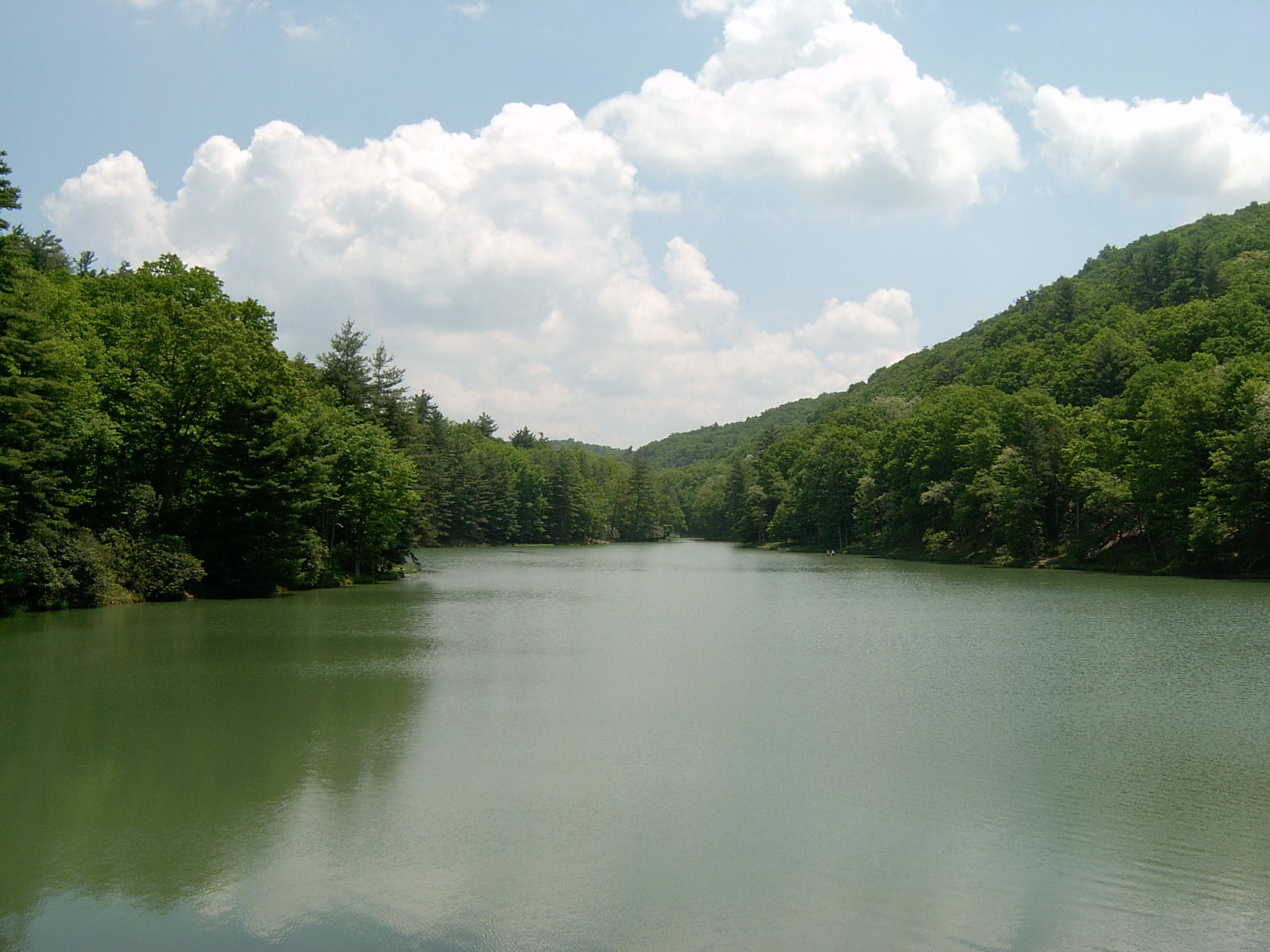
- Watoga Lake

- Location within West Virginia
- Location: Pocahontas, West Virginia, United States
- Nearest town: Seebert, West Virginia
- Coordinates: 38°06′13″N 80°08′59″W
- Area: 10,100 acres (41 km^{2})
- Elevation: 2,894 ft (882 m)
- Established: May 1934
- Named for: Watoga Lake
- Governing body: West Virginia Division of Natural Resources
- Website: wvstateparks.com/park/watoga-state-park/
- New Deal Resources in Watoga State Park Historic District
- U.S. National Register of Historic Places
- U.S. Historic district
- Location within West Virginia Location within the United States
- Location: HC 82 (9 miles southwest of WV 39), near Marlinton, West Virginia
- Area: 10,269 acres (4,156 ha)
- NRHP reference No.: 10001227
- Added to NRHP: February 4, 2011

Watoga State Park is a state park located near Seebert in Pocahontas County, West Virginia. The largest of West Virginia's state parks, it covers slightly over 10,100 acres (41 km^{2}). Nearby parks include the Greenbrier River Trail, which is adjacent to the park, Beartown State Park, and Droop Mountain Battlefield State Park. Also immediately adjacent to the park is the 9,482-acre Calvin Price State Forest. It is one of the darkest night skies of all of West Virginia State Parks.

== History ==
Watoga State Park’s name comes from the Cherokee word for “starry waters”. The land that forms the nucleus of Watoga was originally acquired in January 1925, when the park was initially planned to be a state forest. In May 1934, a decision was made to instead develop the site as a state park. Much of the development on the site was done by the Civilian Conservation Corps (CCC) and the park was first opened on July 1, 1937. Development of the park stopped during WWII, but after the war, work on the park resumed, and the first camping area opened in 1953, and eight deluxe cabins opened in 1956. Recreational use of the park increased during the 60s and 70s, requiring the addition of another camping area. Today, the park is supported by the Watoga State Park Foundation which promotes the recreation, conservation, ecology, history, and natural resources of the park.

== New Deal Resources in Watoga State Park Historic District ==
The New Deal Resources in Watoga State Park Historic District is a national historic district encompassing 59 contributing buildings, 35 contributing structures, 2 contributing sites, and 11 contributing objects. They include water fountains; trails; a swimming pool; a reservoir; rental cabins; and picnic shelters; as well as a former CCC camp. The park is the site of the Fred E. Brooks Memorial Arboretum, a 400-acre arboretum that encompasses the drainage of Two Mile Run. Named in honor of Fred E. Brooks, a noted West Virginia naturalist who died in 1933, the Arboretum's construction began about 1935 and a dedication was held in 1938.

It was listed on the National Register of Historic Places in 2010.

== Features ==
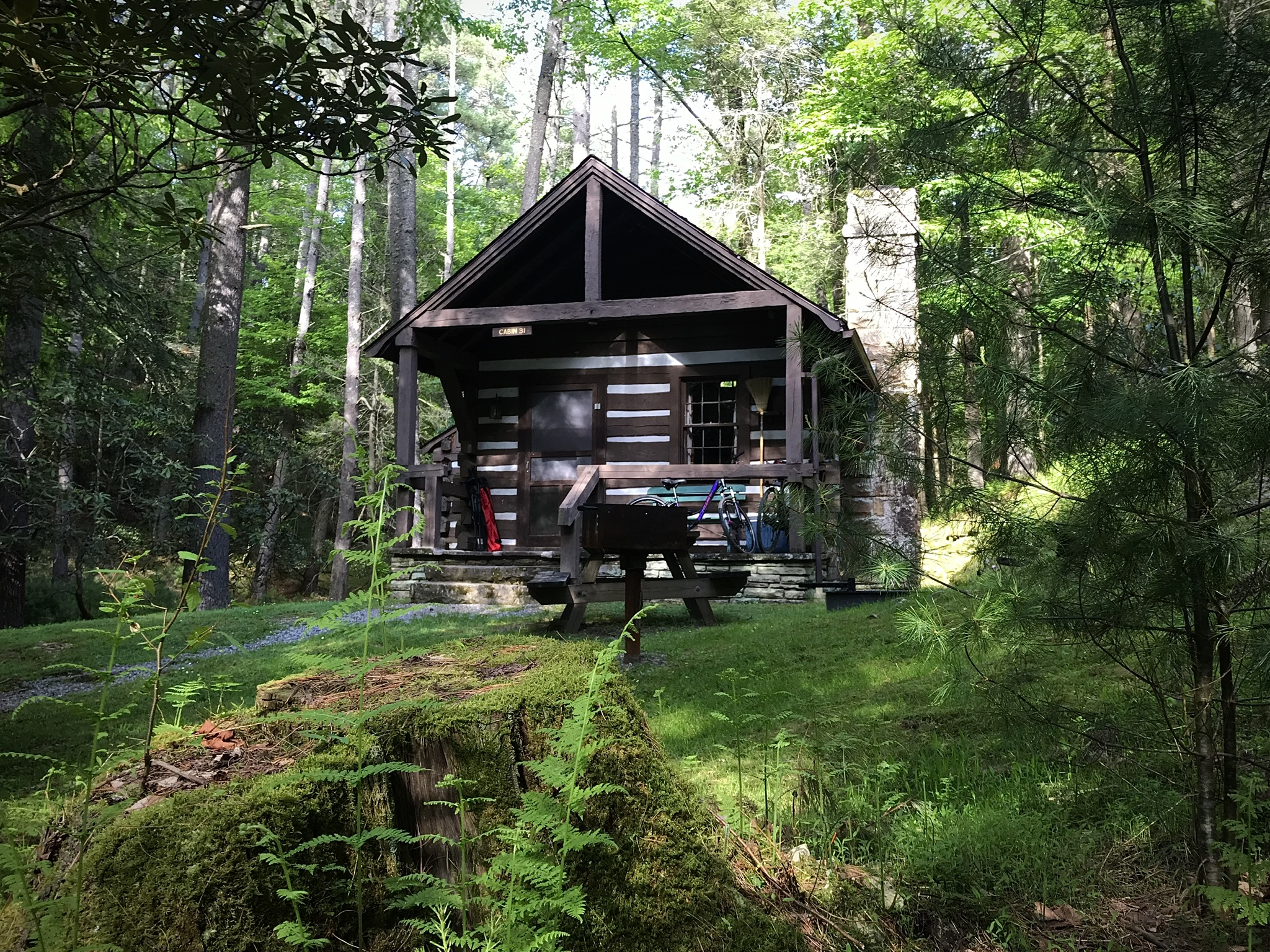
Cabin 31, Watoga State Park, West Virginia. June, 2020.

- 34 cabins
- 2 campgrounds with 88 total campsites (50 with electricity)
- 11-acre (45,000 m^{2}) fishing lake with boat rentals
- 37.5 miles of hiking trails
- Brooks Memorial Arboretum
- Ann Bailey Lookout Tower
- Greenbrier River Trail
- CCC Museum
- Picnic areas

== Hiking Trails ==
Watoga State Park has many hiking trails to choose from that vary in length and difficulty.

A small list of these trails includes

- Allegheny Trail
- Ann Bailey Trail
- Arrowhead Trail
- Bearpen Trail
- Brooks Memorial Arboretum Trails
- Buck and Doe Trail
- Burnside Ridge Trail
- Honeymoon Trail
- Jesse's Cove Trail
- Kennison Run Trail
- Lake Trail
- Monongaseneka Trail
- North Boundary Trail
- Pine Run Trail
- T. M. Cheek Trail
- Ten Acre Trail
- South Burnside Trail

These trails are regularly maintained by the Watoga Foundation, and you can look at a map by clicking here.

== See also ==
- List of West Virginia state parks
- State park
