= Hills Creek (West Virginia) =

Stream in West Virginia, U.S.

Coordinates: 38°07′10″N 80°16′40″W

Hills Creek is a stream in the U.S. state of West Virginia.

Hills Creek was named after Richard Hill, an early settler.

== See also ==
- List of rivers of West Virginia
