= Hillsboro, West Virginia =

- Town
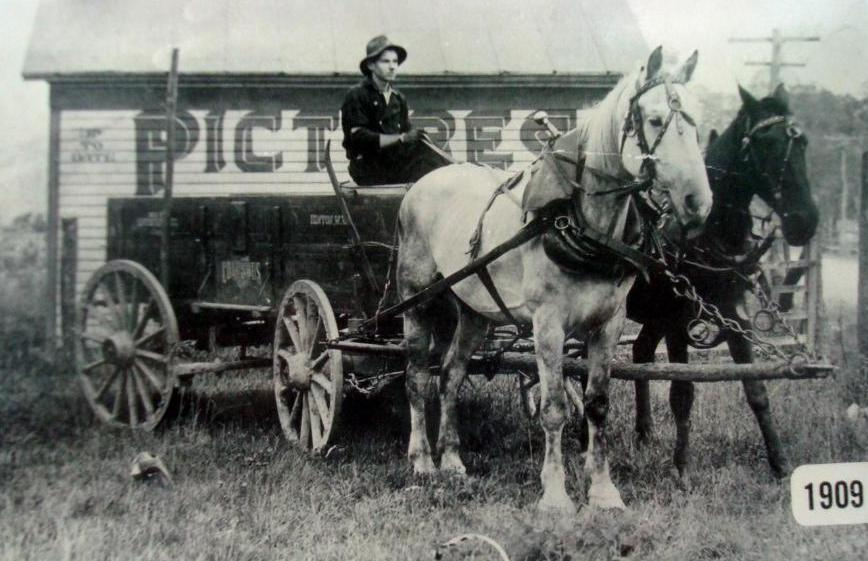
- Spring 1918

- Location of Hillsboro in Pocahontas County, West Virginia.
- Coordinates: 38°8′17″N 80°12′45″W
- Country: United States
- State: West Virginia
- County: Pocahontas

Area
  - Total: 0.53 sq mi (1.38 km^{2})
  - Land: 0.53 sq mi (1.38 km^{2})
  - Water: 0 sq mi (0.00 km^{2})
- Elevation: 2,303 ft (702 m)

Population (2020)
  - Total: 232
  - Estimate (2021): 231
  - Density: 446.7/sq mi (172.47/km^{2})
- Time zone: UTC-5 (Eastern (EST))
  - Summer (DST): UTC-4 (EDT)
- ZIP code: 24946
- Area code: 304
- FIPS code: 54-37372
- GNIS feature ID: 1551448
- Website: https://hillsborowv.com/

Hillsboro is a town in Pocahontas County, West Virginia, United States. The population was 232 at the 2020 census.

== History ==
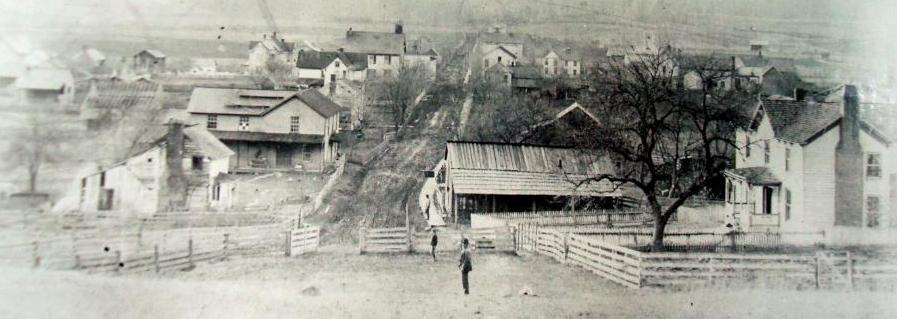
Old Town of Hillsboro

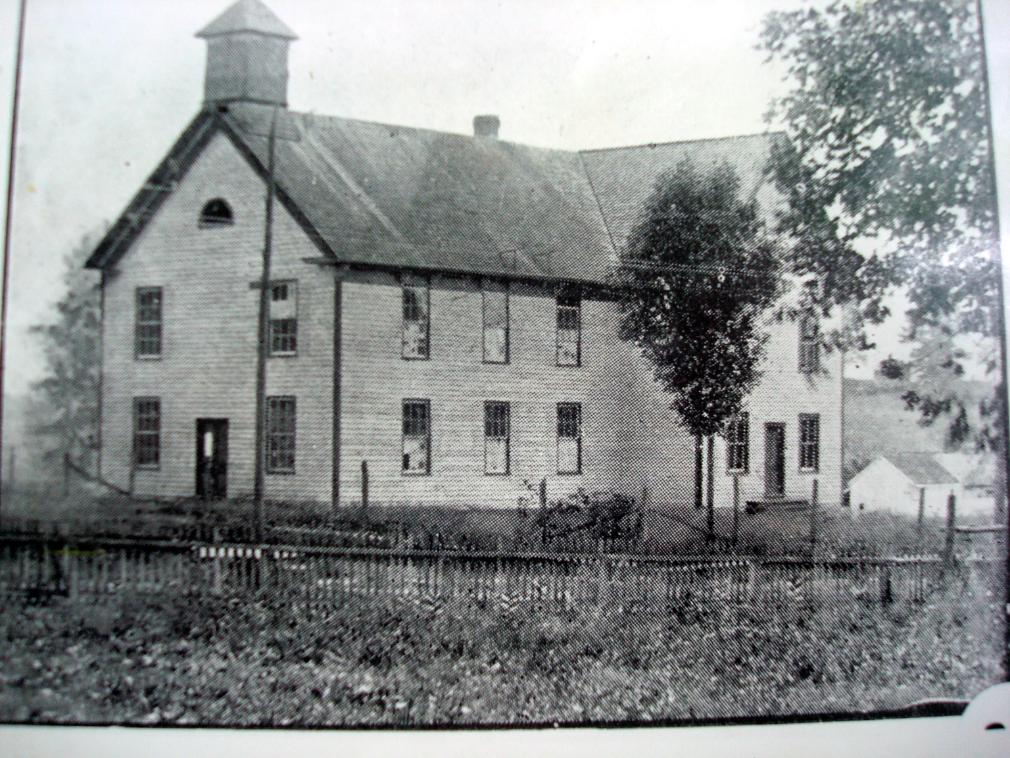
Hillsboro Academy

Hillsboro was named for pioneer John (Richard) Hill, from North Carolina, who built a log cabin near what is now Lobelia. Most of the early settlers were Scots-Irish and worked in agriculture and stock raising.

In the 1800s the town of Hillsboro centered on the educational institution Little Levels Academy. Established in 1842, the school closed 18 years later at the onset of the Civil War. In 1865, the county purchased the building and ran it as a public school through the 1880s, and it became a school of higher order for boys called Hillsboro Academy. The basement of the Methodist Church served as a school of high order for girls called Hillsboro College, or Little Levels Seminary. Eventually the brick Academy was torn down and replaced by a wood-frame school for both boys and girls. Later the school was rebuilt in brick as Hillsboro High School.

Millpoint, in northern Hillsboro, was once the site of a small industrial village, "including within its limits proper a store, a blacksmith shop, two flour mills, and three homes." One of the mills has been restored and can be seen along Route 219.

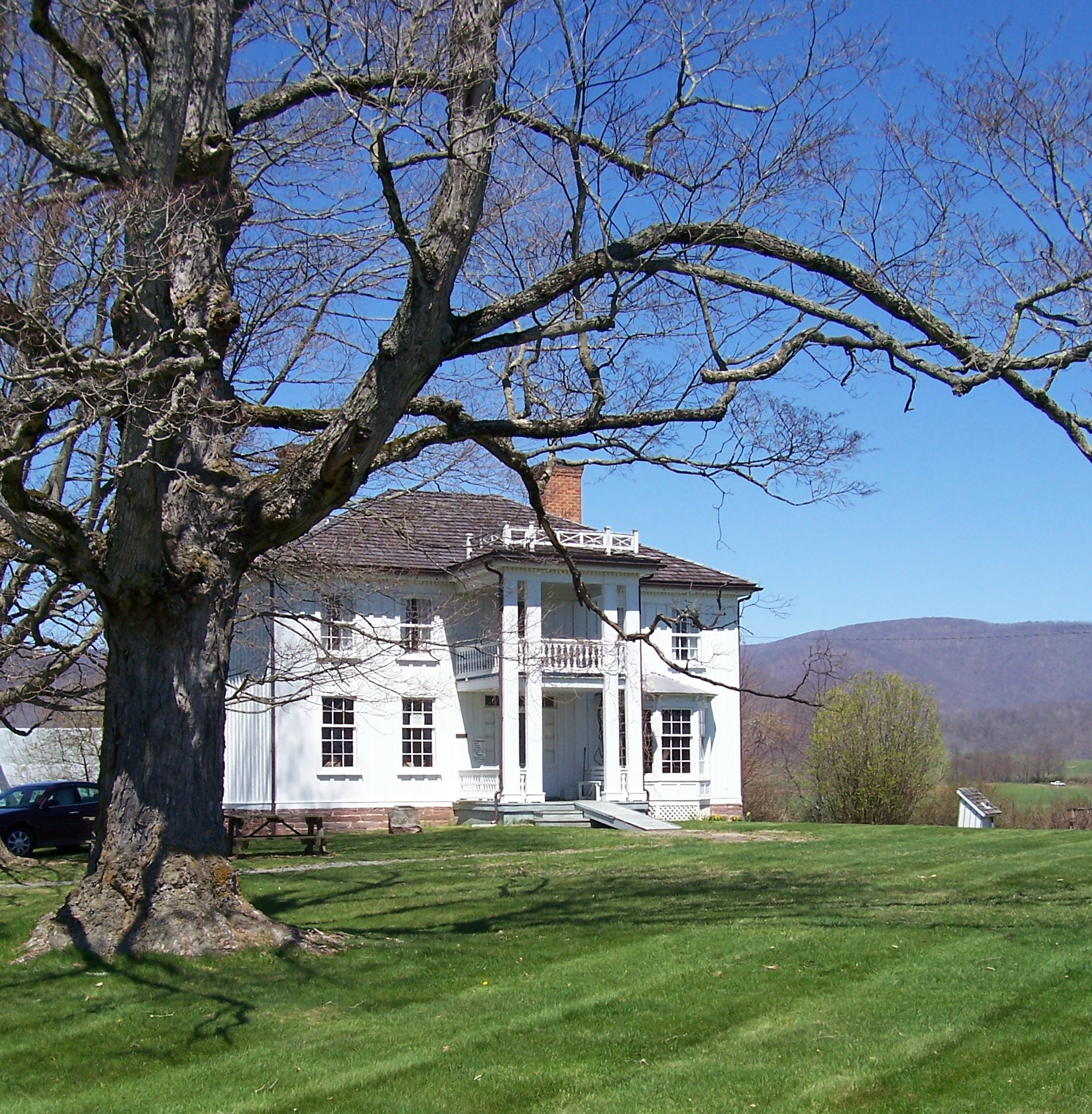
Stulting House at the Pearl Buck Birthplace

In 1892, the author Pearl S. Buck was born in a large white two-story house at the northern end of town. Shortly thereafter, her family, Presbyterian missionaries, returned to China, but her West Virginia roots nevertheless had a significant impact on Buck through her mother Carrie.

The Dutch-style "city house," now on the National Register of Historic Places, has been restored into a museum, the Pearl S. Buck Birthplace. It displays an array of antiques from the 1892 period, including many family originals. Also on the National Register of Historic Places are the Richard Beard House and Locust Creek Covered Bridge.

In late June, the town hosts the annual Little Levels Heritage Fair to celebrate the history of the region.

Hillsboro is also featured in the movie Patch Adams, where Dr. Patch Adams purchased land to build a medical clinic based on his philosophy of doctor-patient interaction. A medical clinic is planned but has not yet been constructed, as fund-raising is still underway. Currently, the Gesundheit Institute host people at the facility to engage in learning and volunteering.

== Points of interest ==
Main Attractions:

- Little Levels Heritage Fair, late June
- The Pearl S. Buck Birthplace, Historic House and Museum (1875)
- The Yew Mountain Center experiential education center and nature preserve
- Patch Adams and the Gesundheit! Institute
- Local Craft Shops
- US Food Bank

Parks & Scenic Drives:

- Watoga State Park
- Droop Mountain Battlefield
- Cranberry Glades Botanical Area
- Beartown State Park
- Highland Scenic Highway
- Monongahela National Forest
- Brooks Memorial Arboretum
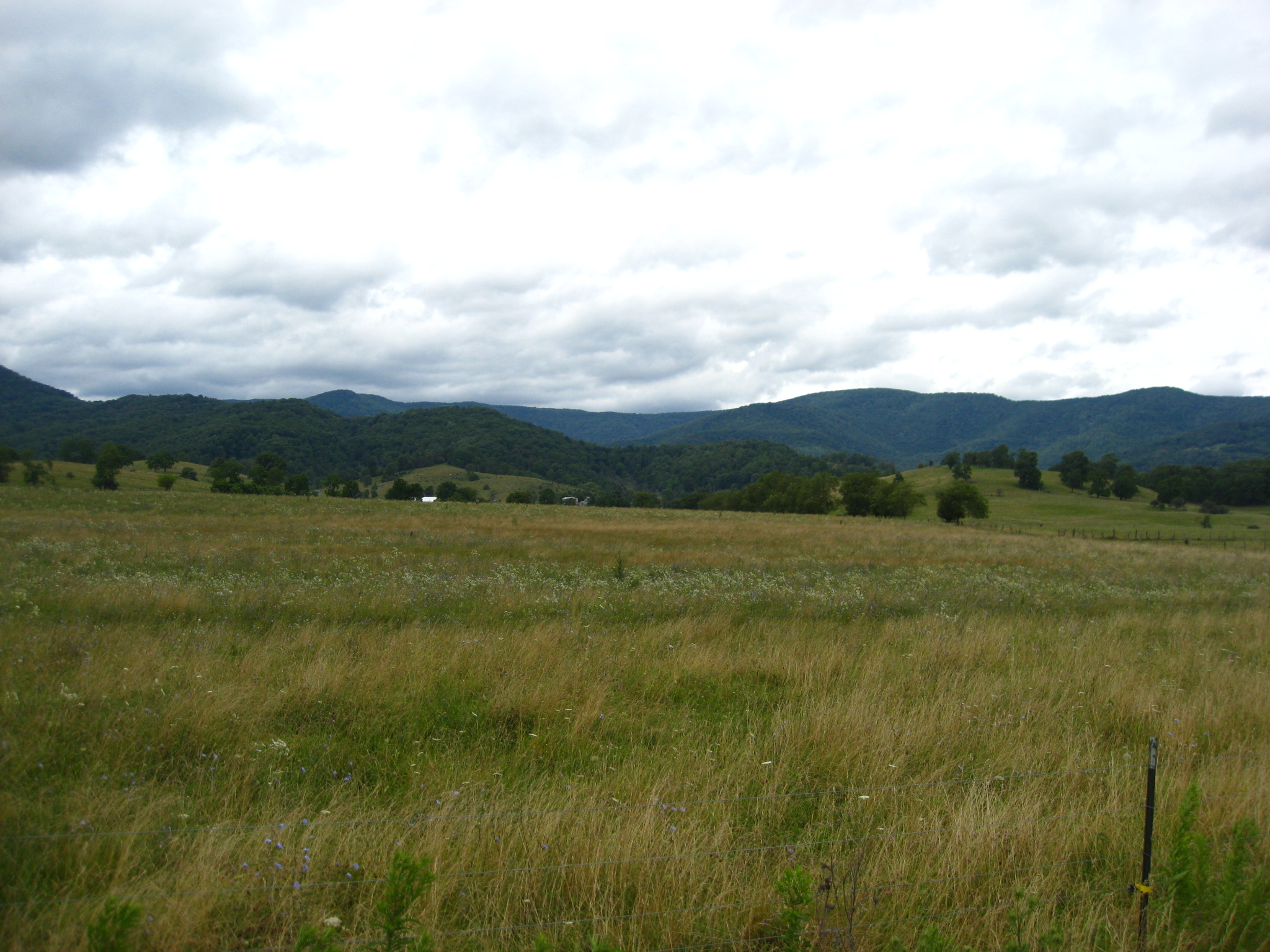
Fields near Hillsboro

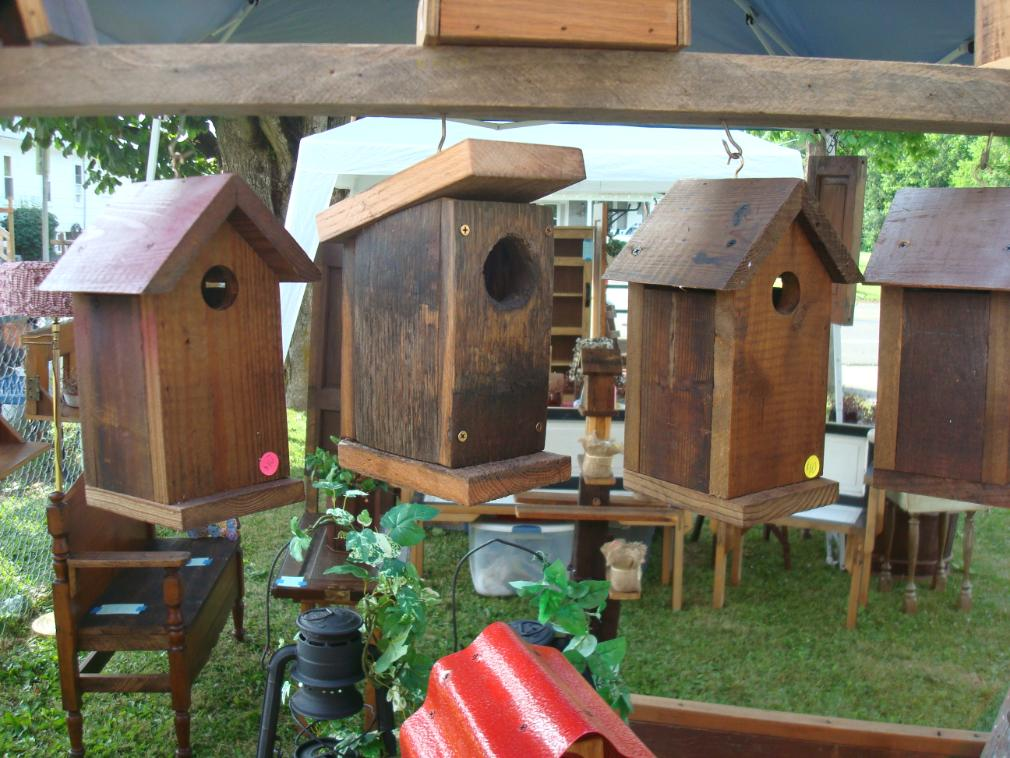
Crafts from the Little Levels Heritage Fair

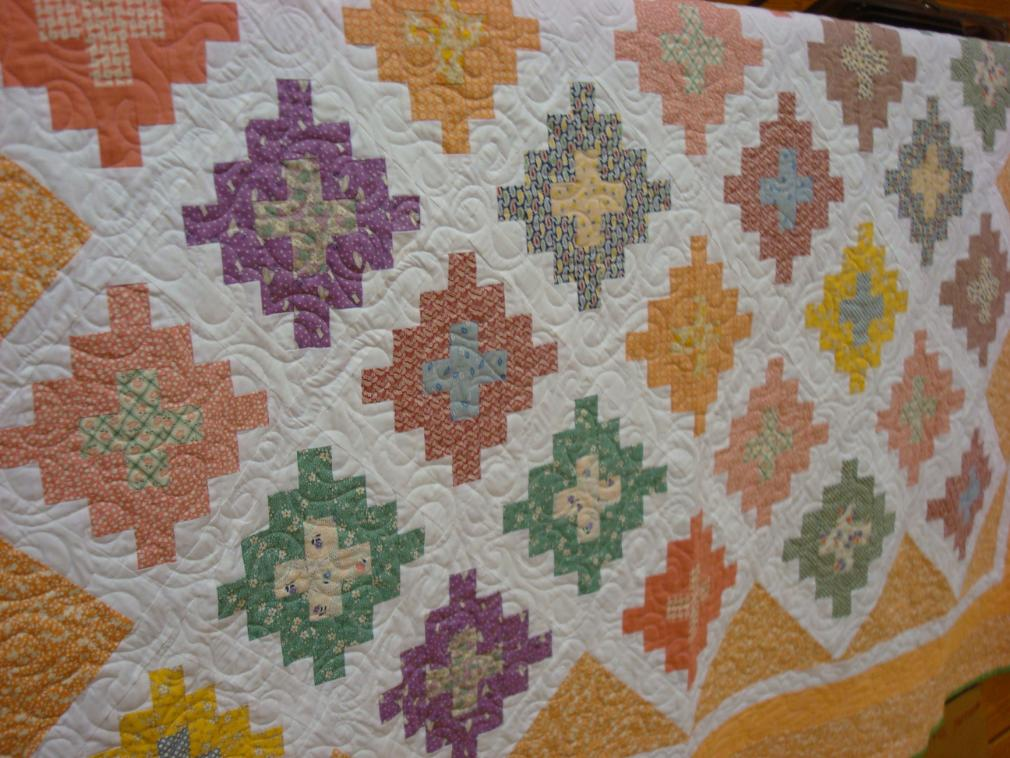
Quilt from the Fair

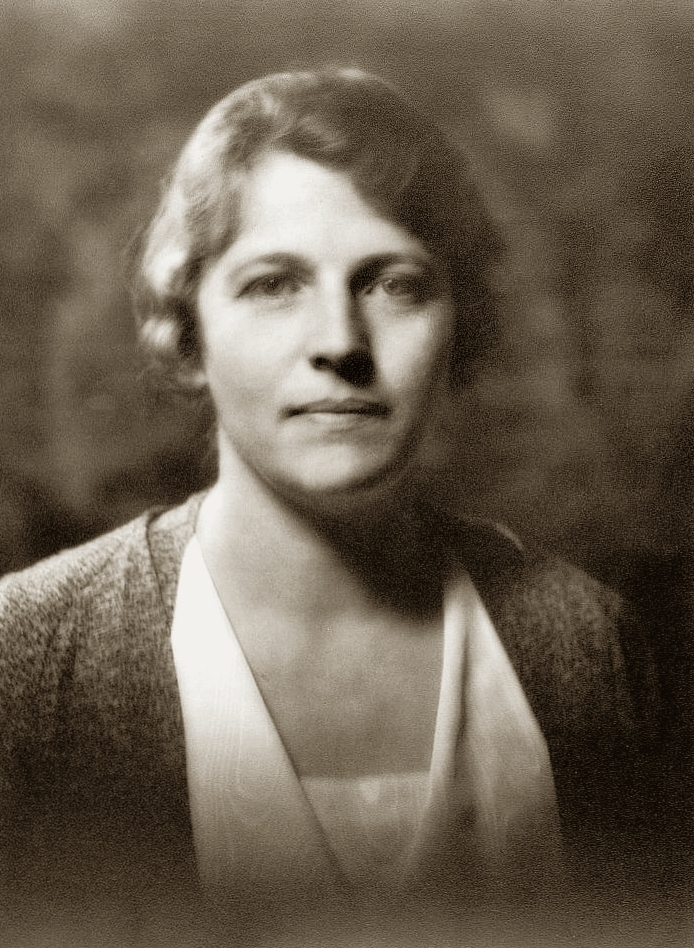
Pearl S. Buck

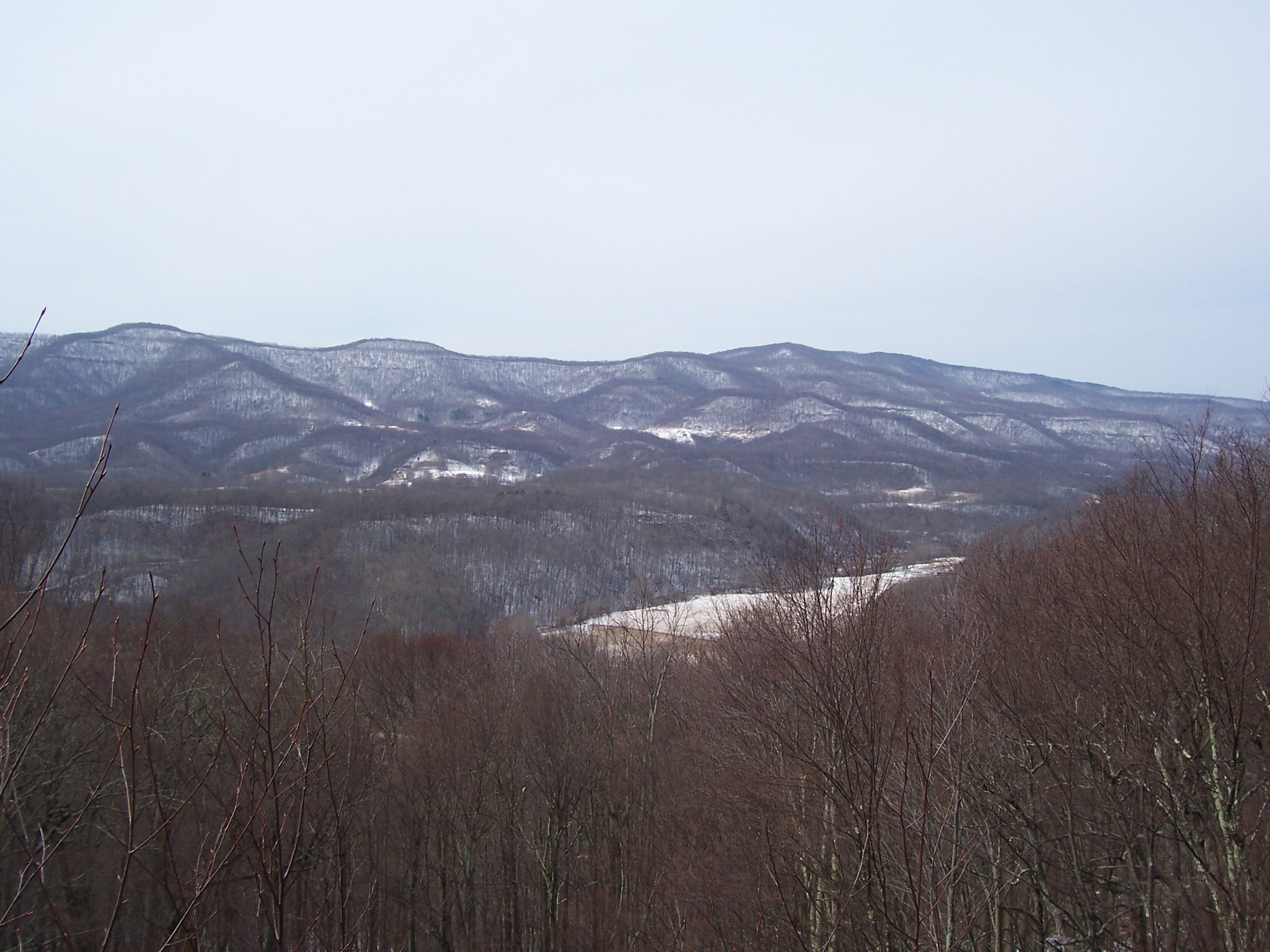
Overlook at Droop Mountain Battlefield State Park

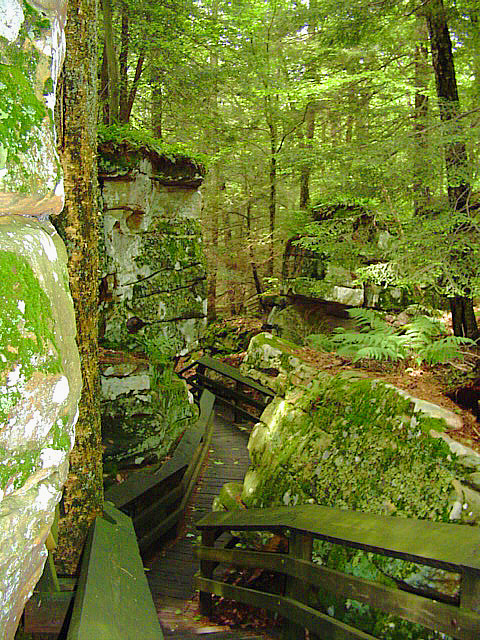
Beartown State Park

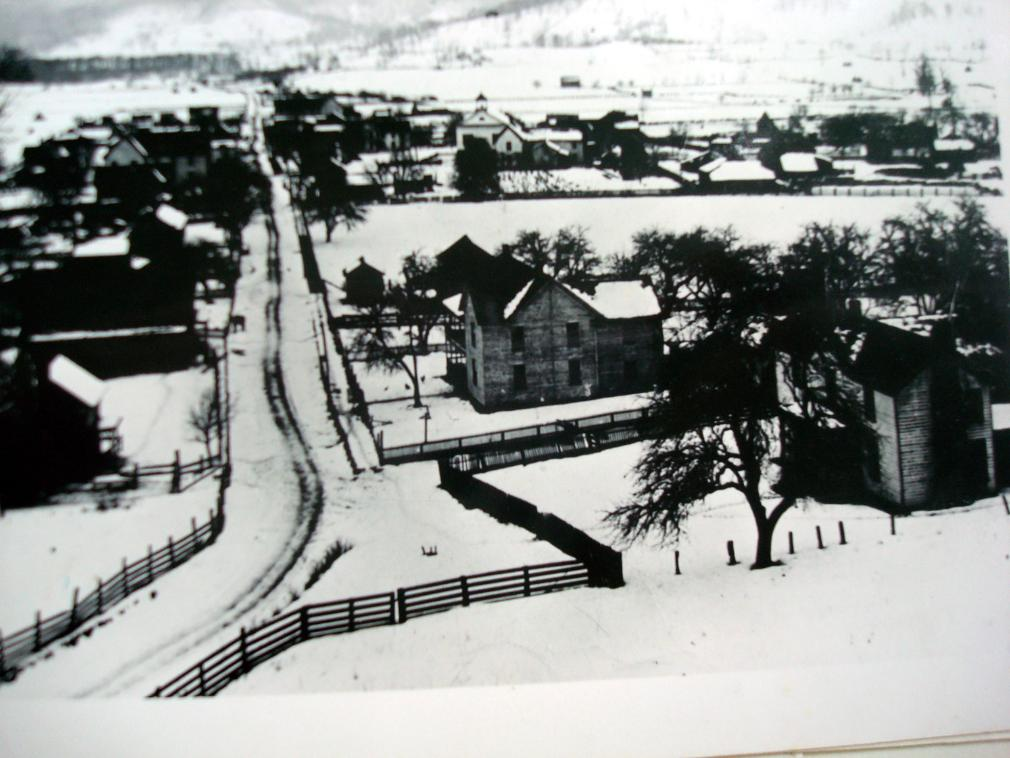
Old Town of Hillsboro

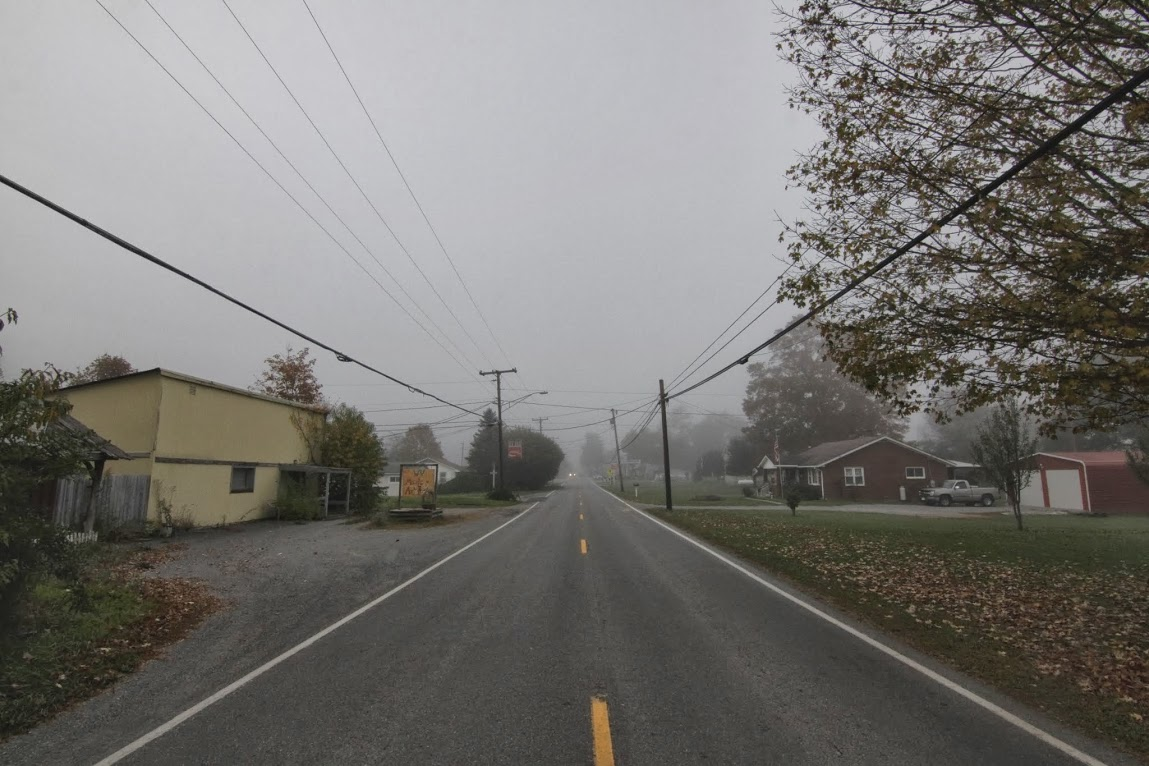
Route 219 in Hillsboro

== Notable people ==
- Pearl S. Buck, author and Nobel Prize winner. (1892–1973)
- Dwight Diller, banjo and fiddle player and teacher
- William Luther Pierce, founder of the National Alliance. (1933–2002)

== Geography ==
Hillsboro is located at 38°8′17″N 80°12′45″W (38.138068, -80.212581).

According to the United States Census Bureau, the town has a total area of 0.36 square miles (0.93 km^{2}), all land.

== Demographics ==
Historical population
Census	Pop.	Note	%±
1880	99		—
1890	166		67.7%
1900	339		104.2%
1910	181		−46.6%
1920	215		18.8%
1930	220		2.3%
1940	224		1.8%
1950	241		7.6%
1960	210		−12.9%
1970	267		27.1%
1980	276		3.4%
1990	188		−31.9%
2000	243		29.3%
2010	260		7.0%
2020	232		−10.8%
2021 (est.)	231	▼	−0.4%
U.S. Decennial Census

=== 2010 census ===
As of the census of 2010, there were 260 people, 120 households, and 75 families living in the town. The population density was 722.2 inhabitants per square mile (278.8/km^{2}). There were 149 housing units at an average density of 413.9 per square mile (159.8/km^{2}). The racial makeup of the town was 98.5% White, 1.2% Native American, and 0.4% from two or more races.

There were 120 households, of which 30.0% had children under the age of 18 living with them, 36.7% were married couples living together, 13.3% had a female householder with no husband present, 12.5% had a male householder with no wife present, and 37.5% were non-families. 31.7% of all households were made up of individuals, and 15.8% had someone living alone who was 65 years of age or older. The average household size was 2.17 and the average family size was 2.68.

The median age in the town was 39.3 years. 23.1% of residents were under the age of 18; 5.4% were between the ages of 18 and 24; 27.7% were from 25 to 44; 25.8% were from 45 to 64; and 18.1% were 65 years of age or older. The gender makeup of the town was 46.9% male and 53.1% female.

=== 2000 census ===
As of the census of 2000, there were 243 people, 115 households, and 70 families living in the town. The population density was 680.0 inhabitants per square mile (260.6/km^{2}). There were 136 housing units at an average density of 380.6 per square mile (145.9/km^{2}). The racial makeup of the town was 98.35% White, and 1.65% from two or more races. Hispanic or Latino of any race were 0.82% of the population.

There were 115 households, out of which 21.7% had children under the age of 18 living with them, 39.1% were married couples living together, 17.4% had a female householder with no husband present, and 39.1% were non-families. 36.5% of all households were made up of individuals, and 16.5% had someone living alone who was 65 years of age or older. The average household size was 2.11 and the average family size was 2.66.

In the town, the population was spread out, with 19.8% under the age of 18, 8.2% from 18 to 24, 28.0% from 25 to 44, 25.5% from 45 to 64, and 18.5% who were 65 years of age or older. The median age was 41 years. For every 100 females, there were 82.7 males. For every 100 females age 18 and over, there were 77.3 males.

The median income for a household in the town was $29,583, and the median income for a family was $31,250. Males had a median income of $30,278 versus $15,625 for females. The per capita income for the town was $20,929. About 27.4% of families and 32.1% of the population were below the poverty line, including 40.0% of those under the age of eighteen and 28.9% of those 65 or over.
