= List of mountains of West Virginia =

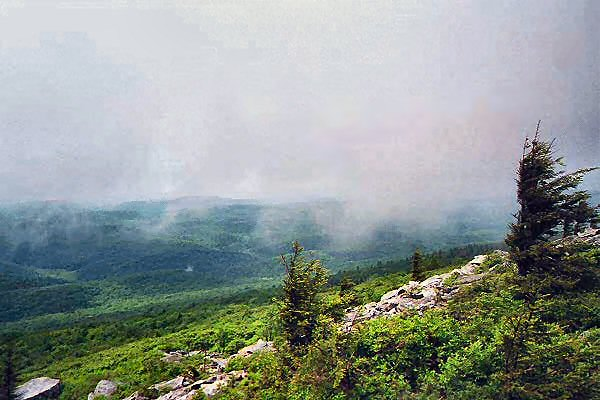
Spruce Mountain is the tallest mountain in the state of West Virginia

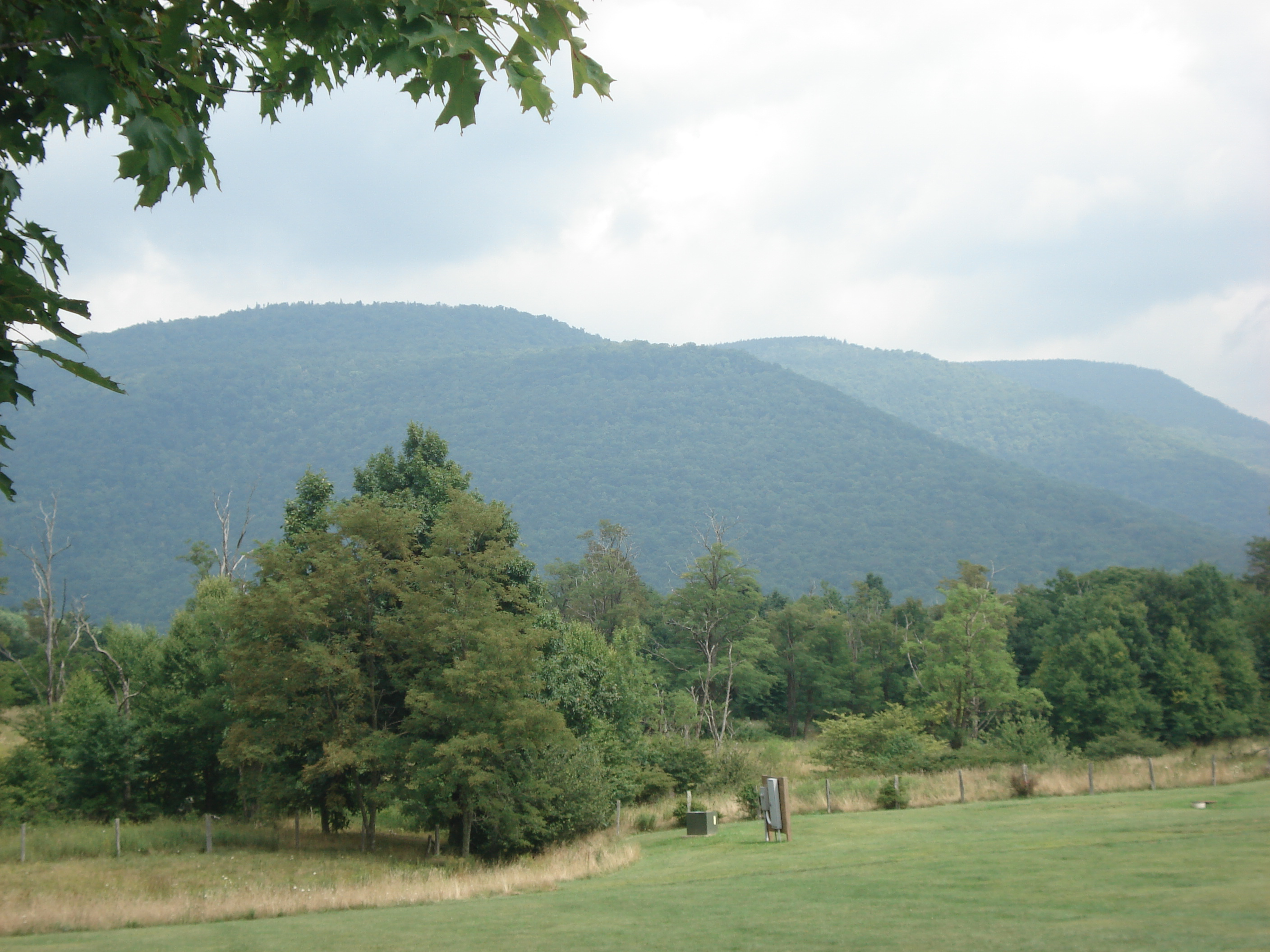
Back Allegheny Mountain

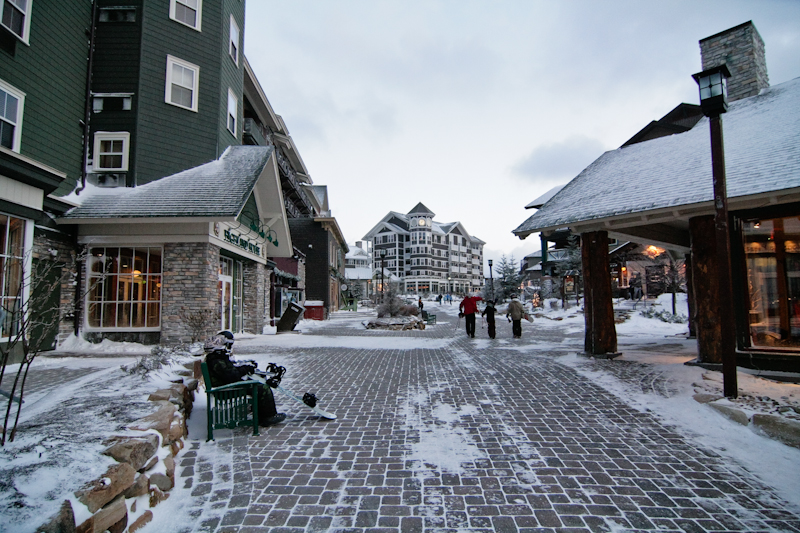
Snowshoe Mountain is a ski resort in the Alleghenies of Pocahontas County

Mountains of West Virginia is a list of mountains in the U.S. state of West Virginia. This list includes mountains in the Appalachian range, which covers the entirety of the state. West Virginia's official state nickname is the Mountain State.

Mountain	Height (ft. / m)	Notes
Spruce Mountain	4863 / 1482	Tallest mountain in the state, highest elevation achieved at Spruce Knob
Cheat Mountain	4848 / 1478	Highest elevation achieved at Thorny Flat
Back Allegheny Mountain	4843 / 1476	Highest elevation achieved at Bald Knob
Mount Porte Crayon	4770 / 1454	
Yew Mountains	4705 / 1434	Highest elevation achieved at Red Spruce Knob; highest point along the Highland Scenic Highway-Route 150
North Fork Mountain	4588 / 1398	Highest elevation achieved at Kile Knob
Allegheny Mountain	4478 / 1365	Highest elevation achieved at Paddy Knob
Shavers Mountain	4432 / 1351	Highest elevation achieved at Gaudineer Knob
Shenandoah Mountain	4397 / 1340	Highest elevation achieved at Reddish Knob
Keeny Knob	3921 / 1195	Highest elevation in Summers County [[]]
Backbone Mountain	3684 / 1123	
Flat Top Mountain	3560 / 1085	Highest elevation achieved at Huff Knob
Castle Mountain (Pendleton)	3410 / 1039	There are two Castle Mountains in West Virginia
Crumpler Mountain (McDowell County, West Virginia)	3377 / 1020	
Cherokee Mountain (McDowell County, West Virginia)	3190 / 1001	
New Creek Mountain	3094 / 940	
Plumley Mountain	3078 / 938	Named after the Plumley Family and highest elevation achieved at Plumley Knob
Saddle Mountain	3074 / 937	
South Branch Mountain	3028 / 923	
Big Schloss	2964 / 903	
Short Mountain	2872 / 875	
Nathaniel Mountain	2739 / 835	
Patterson Creek Mountain	2723 / 830	
Mill Creek Mountain	2650/ 810	
Cacapon Mountain	2619 / 798	
Horsepen Mountain	2500 / 762	
Powell Mountain	2417 / 737	
Blue Ridge Mountain	2388 / 728	
Sideling Hill	2310 / 704	Syncline mountain
Spring Gap Mountain	2237 / 682	
Third Hill Mountain	2165 / 660	
North River Mountain	2149 / 655	
Baker Mountain	2060 / 628	
Cooper Mountain	2028 / 618	
Blair Mountain	1952 / 595	The location of the Battle of Blair Mountain
Sleepy Creek Mountain	1903 / 580	
North Mountain	1673 / 510	
Little Cacapon Mountain	1575 / 480	
Bear Garden Mountain	1566 / 477	
Ice Mountain	1509 / 460	
Schaffenaker Mountain	1488 / 454	
Castle Mountain (Hampshire)	1260 / 384	There are two Castle Mountains in West Virginia
