= Bald Knob (West Virginia) =

Mountain summit in West Virginia, U.S.

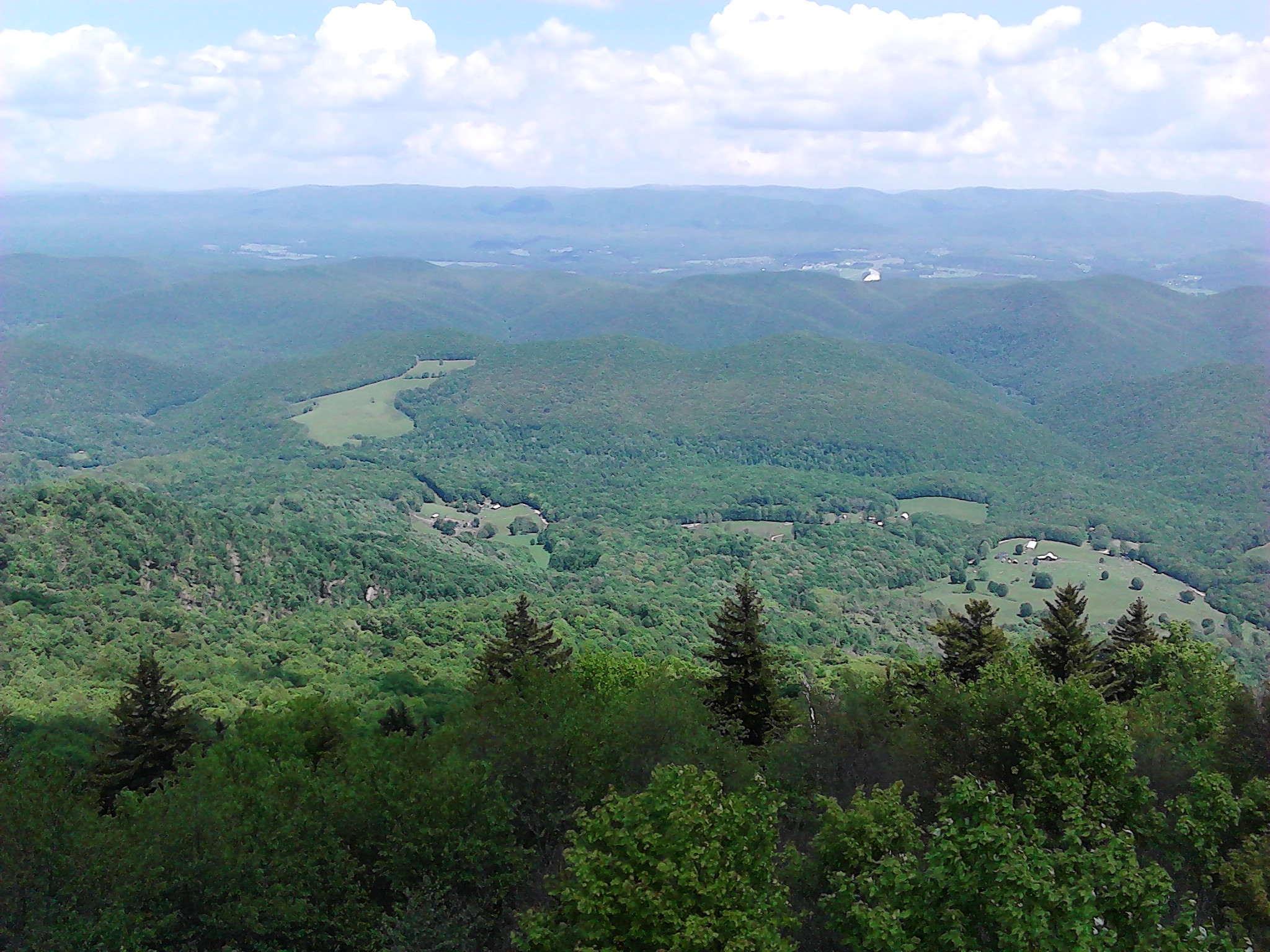

Highest point
- Elevation: 4,843 ft (1,476 m)
- Prominence: 902 ft (275 m)
- Coordinates: 38°26′52″N 79°55′52″W

Geography
- Location within West Virginia
- Location: Pocahontas, West Virginia, United States
- Parent range: Back Allegheny Mountain

Climbing
- Access: train via Cass Scenic Railroad

Bald Knob is the highest summit of Back Allegheny Mountain in Pocahontas County, West Virginia and is part of Cass Scenic Railroad State Park. At an altitude of 4,843 feet (1,476 m) above sea level, Bald Knob is the third-highest point in West Virginia and the Allegheny Mountains.

== Description ==
Bald Knob's elevation— only 21 feet (6.4 m) lower than the highest point in the Alleghenies, Spruce Knob)—gives it a unique hemiboreal ecosystem. While the lower and middle elevations of the mountain are populated by oak, hickory, birch, beech and maple, the summit dome was historically dominated by red spruce.

Rowan, eastern hemlock, and balsam fir also occur above 4,000 feet (1,200 m), though they are not as common as the spruce. The region was extensively logged from 1900 to 1960. Red spruce, being a valuable natural resource, attracted timber companies into the area. By 1940, the mountain had been stripped of nearly all virgin red spruce. The last harvest of red spruce and eastern hemlock on Bald Knob was in 1960. The summit was one of the last places logged by the Mower Lumber Company. Today, red spruce and other high elevation flora are making a comeback on the mountain; however, it will take many years for the area to fully recover.

=== Access ===
The mountaintop can be reached by hiking but is more commonly reached by riding the Cass Scenic Railroad, which transports visitors via old logging railroads to a 4,730 feet (1,440 m) sub-peak approximately 1/4 mile (0.40 km) north of Bald Knob.

== Climate ==
Bald Knob generally experiences mild summers and cold winters. The summit and west facing slopes of the mountain receive an average of 60 inches (1,500 mm) of precipitation per year and 180 inches (4,600 mm) of snowfall. The annual record snowfall is over 300 inches (7,600 mm). Temperatures in the area have been known to reach −40 degrees Fahrenheit (−40 °C). Winter conditions can occur anytime from early October through early May. Snowfall has been observed in the higher elevations in every month except July. Federal troops observed snowfall on August 13, 1861, at nearby Fort Milroy. The last freeze usually occurs in May and the first freeze usually occurs in September; however, freezing temperatures can occur anytime throughout the year. Current weather conditions for both the summit and base of the mountain at the town of Cass are available below.

== Accessing Bald Knob ==
While most of Back Allegheny Mountain is owned by Monongahela National Forest, the summit at Bald Knob itself is part of Cass Scenic Railroad State Park.

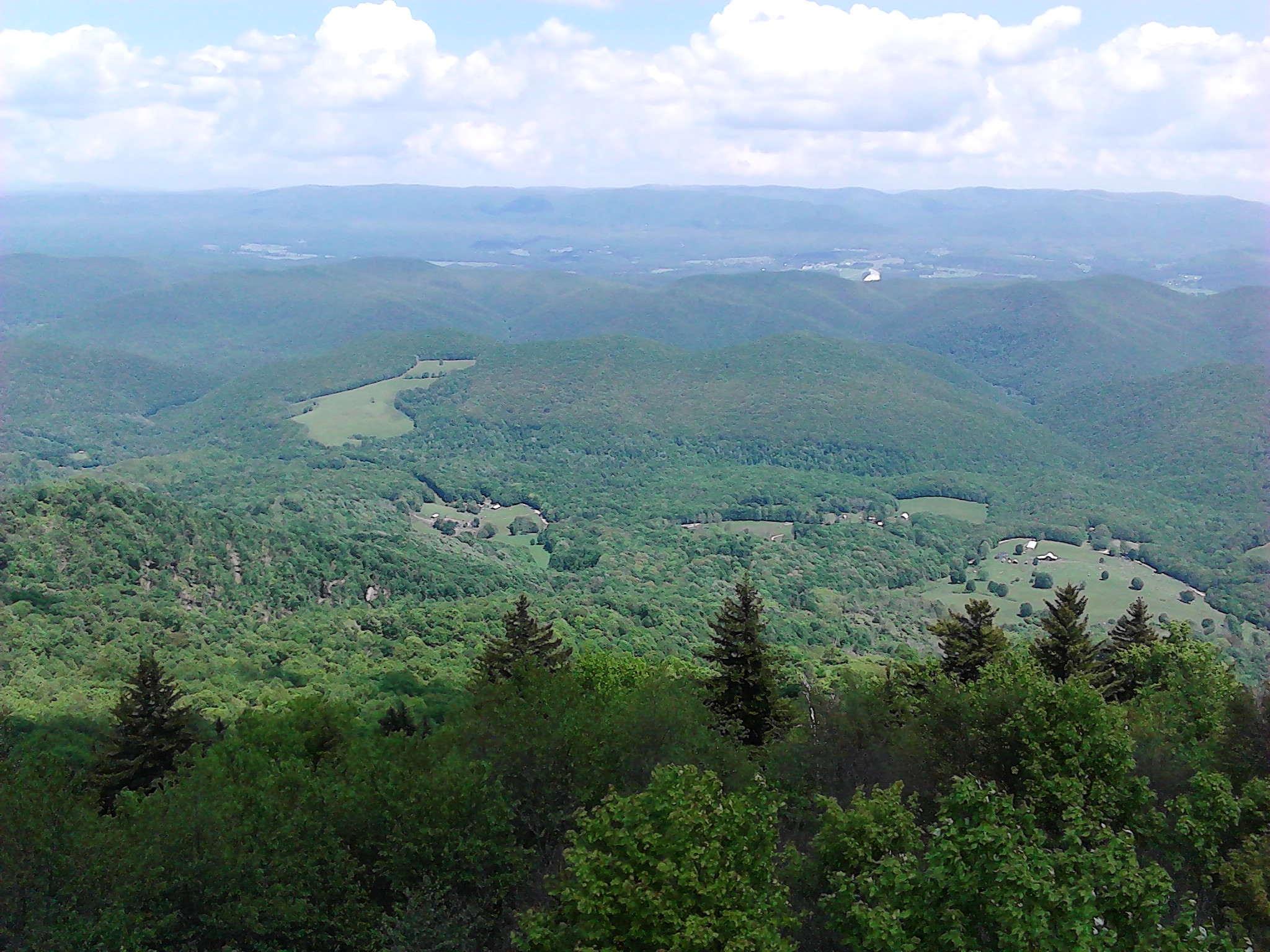
View from the Bald Knob observation deck, accessed via Cass Scenic Railroad

Most visitors to Bald Knob come via train from Cass, but the site is also accessible by Forest Road 267B, which is closed to motorized vehicles most of the year. A two-mile hike from Odey Run can easily be walked or biked to arrive at Bald Knob. For safety reasons, hiking along the railroad grade itself is not permitted.

== Miscellaneous facts ==
- Bald Knob is one of only four mountain summits in West Virginia that rise above 4,800 feet (1,463 m), the other three being Spruce Knob, Thorny Flat, and an unnamed summit near Snowshoe, WV.
- The south face of Bald Knob is the site of the headwaters of Leatherbark Run, West Virginia's highest stream.
- Bald Knob Slopes operated from 1958 to 1969.
- Until 2001, Bald Knob was thought to be the second highest point in the state, but a survey conducted by Snowshoe Ski Resort using GPS technology concluded that Thorny Flat, the highpoint of Cheat Mountain, roughly 5 mi (8.05 km) south of Bald Knob, was approximately 6 ft (1.83 m) higher. Since then, at least one other summit on Cheat Mountain has been identified as being potentially a few feet higher than Bald Knob.
- Bald Knob is the highest point reached by a standard gauge railroad east of the Mississippi River.

== See also ==
- Back Allegheny Mountain
- Cass Scenic Railroad State Park
- Monongahela National Forest
