= Greenbrier, Cheat and Elk Railroad =

Map

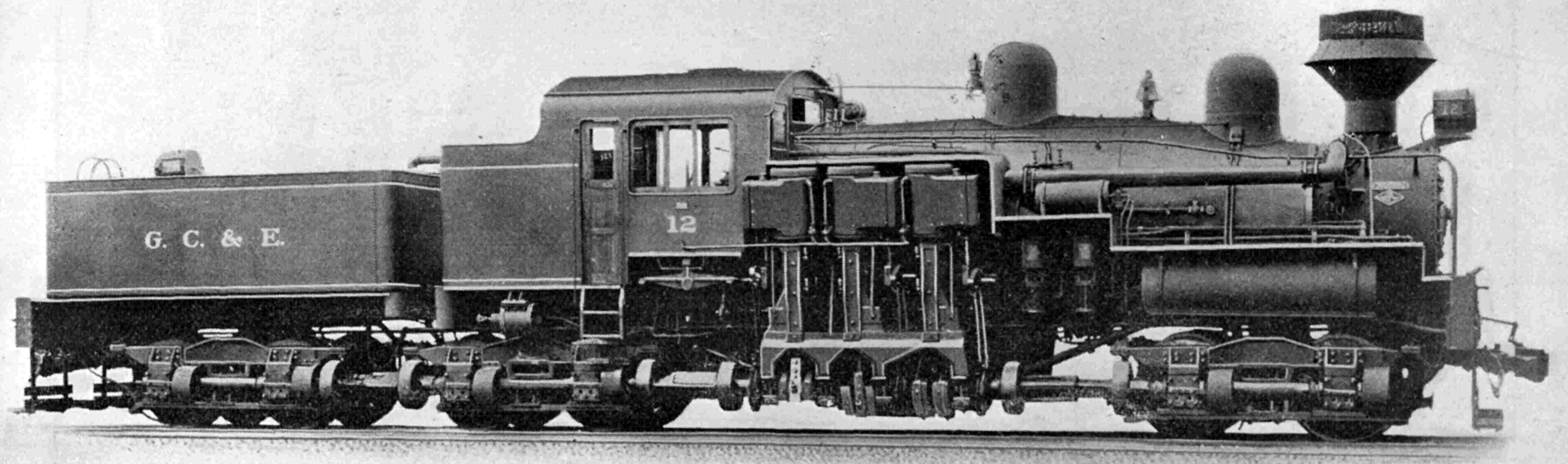
150-ton Class C Shay locomotive built for the Greenbrier, Cheat & Elk RR. 1922 photo.

The Greenbrier, Cheat and Elk Railroad (GC&E) was a logging railroad in West Virginia operating in the early 20th century. Its main line ran from Bergoo to Cheat Junction, where it connected with the Western Maryland Railway (WM).

== History ==
The railroad began c. 1901 as the Greenbrier and Elk River Railroad, which ran from Cass to Spruce under the ownership of the West Virginia Spruce Lumber Company. In addition to the large lumber mill in Cass, the road also served a pulp mill, built in Spruce, beginning in 1904. In 1909 the lumber company was acquired by the West Virginia Pulp and Paper Company (later known as Westvaco), which obtained a new charter for an expanded railroad. This new railroad was initially named the Greenbrier, Elk and Valley Railroad, and then renamed the GC&E in 1910. Spruce became the area's rail hub, as tracks were extended west through Laurel Bank (Slatyfork) and along the Elk River to Bergoo by 1914; and north along the Shavers Fork valley to Cheat Junction by 1917.

The pulp mill in Spruce closed in 1925. Subsequently, the town declined and it eventually was abandoned. In 1927 the GC&E was acquired by the WM.

In 1997 the West Virginia State Rail Authority purchased the GC&E line (then called the Tygart and Laurel Subdivisions) from CSX Transportation, the successor to the Western Maryland Railway. The state established the West Virginia Central Railroad, which has contracted with the Durbin and Greenbrier Valley Railroad (DGVR) to operate a heritage railway on portions of the line.

Out of the locomotives owned and operated by the company, two are preserved, both under ownership of the State of West Virginia. Number 1 (the second) is currently on display at the Baltimore and Ohio Railroad Museum, on Long term loan in exchange for Western Maryland Number 6 (currently operational at the Cass Scenic Railroad.) Number 5 is currently operational and running on the Cass Scenic Railroad, and is also the oldest operational shay in the world at this time. 5 is also the official state locomotive of the state of West Virginia.

== Current operation ==
The DGVR operates The New Tygart Flyer, The Cheat Mountain Salamander, and The Mountain Explorer Dinner Train over a 70-mile section of the line. The excursion trains run between Elkins, Cheat Bridge and Spruce. Also, the Cass Scenic Railroad operates on the section of the line from Cass to Spruce.

== Plans ==
In February 2012, John Smith, the owner of DGVR, unveiled a plan to rebuild a 90-mile loop of currently unused or abandoned grade. This plan would see the abandonment of the Southwestern part of the GC&E, as the rails from that line would be repurposed for use on the loop. That section of the line, which runs between Slaty Fork (Laurel Bank) and Bergoo would then become the Elk River Trail. The project is pending a $20 million grant from the State of West Virginia and, if approved, would be implemented by 2015.

== See also ==
- List of defunct West Virginia railroads
