= Leatherbark Run =

Location
- Country: United States
- State: West Virginia
- County: Pocahontas

Physical characteristics
- Source: Back Allegheny Mountain
  - location: Pocahontas County, WV
  - coordinates: 38°26′42″N 79°55′50″W
  - elevation: 4,728 ft (1,441 m)
- Mouth: Greenbrier River
  - location: Cass, WV
  - coordinates: 38°24′01″N 79°54′34″W
  - elevation: 2,441 ft (744 m)

Leatherbark Run is the name of a stream in Pocahontas County, West Virginia. It is a tributary of the Greenbrier River.

Leatherbark Run has the distinction of being West Virginia's highest stream. It begins at a natural spring on the south face of Bald Knob on Back Allegheny Mountain in the western half of the county. The elevation of its headwaters is 4,728 feet (1,441 m) above sea level. It then proceeds south down the side of the mountain, then turns eastward near Whittaker and continues in that direction until it flows into the Greenbrier at the town of Cass. The total elevation change from its headwaters to its mouth is approximately 2,290 feet (700 m), more than any other stream in the state.

Leatherbark Run was the site of a major logging railroad operation in the early 1900s. Surveyors for the railroad concluded that a railway up alongside of Leatherbark Run was the only feasible way to cross the Allegheny Mountains to reach the vast spruce forests that thrived above 4,000 feet (1,219 m). Today, Cass Scenic Railroad still uses this route to carry passengers into the mountains via Leatherbark Run.

The stream is also noted for its potential to flash flood. Leatherbark Run can flood even when it is not raining in Cass because of the location of its headwaters in a very mountainous area that is notorious for its rapidly changing weather.

== See also ==
- List of rivers of West Virginia
