= Cass Historic District =

Historic house in West Virginia, United States

- U.S. National Register of Historic Places
- U.S. Historic district
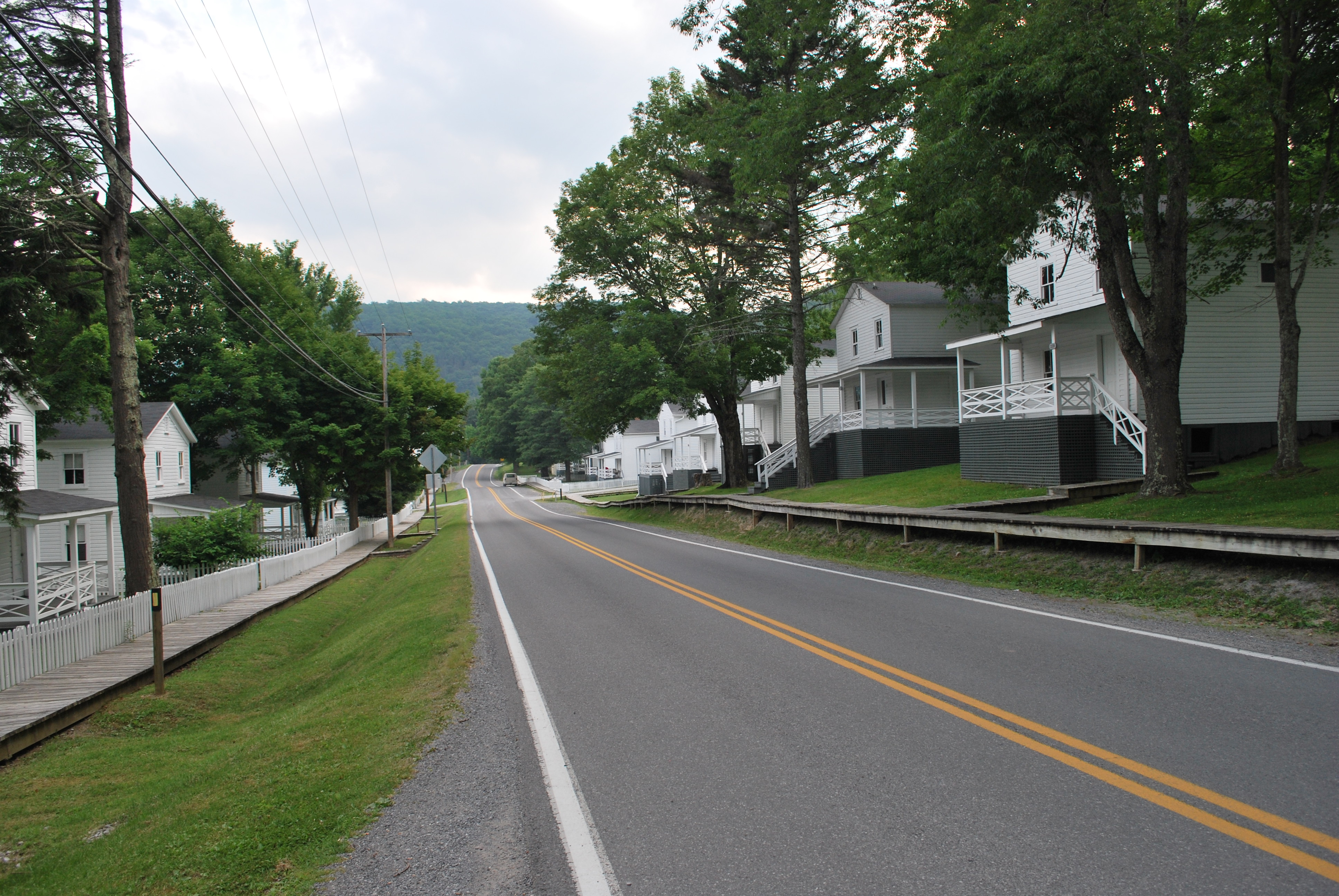
- Cass, West Virginia, July 2008

- Location within West Virginia Location within the United States
- Location: SR 1 and SR 7, Cass, West Virginia
- Coordinates: 38°23′29″N 79°55′8″W
- Area: 316 acres (128 ha)
- Built: 1902
- Architectural style: Gothic
- NRHP reference No.: 80004038
- Added to NRHP: November 28, 1980

Cass Historic District is a national historic district located at Cass, Pocahontas County, West Virginia. The district encompasses 79 contributing buildings and 1 contributing structure. Cass was founded in 1902 as a company town for lumbering by the West Virginia Pulp and Paper Company. The district features three classes of housing: class three houses for day laborers, class two houses for section foreman and office personnel, and class one houses for persons in management positions. The class three houses measure 30 feet by 20 feet, and are very stout, rectangular two-story frame structures, with front and rear porches. Non-residential buildings include the former hospital, clubhouse, town building, lodge hall, former Methodist and Presbyterian churches, old school building, and the company store.

It was listed on the National Register of Historic Places in 1980.
