= Whitetop =

Whitetop may refer to:

- Lepidium draba, a plant from the family Brassicaceae
- Rhynchospora colorata, a plant from the family Cyperaceae
- Whitetopping, a construction practice
- A covered wagon, also called a "whitetop"
- Whitetop Mountain, Virginia, United States
- Whitetop Mountain (British Columbia), Canada
- Whitetop, Virginia, a village in Virginia, United States

== See also ==
- White Top
