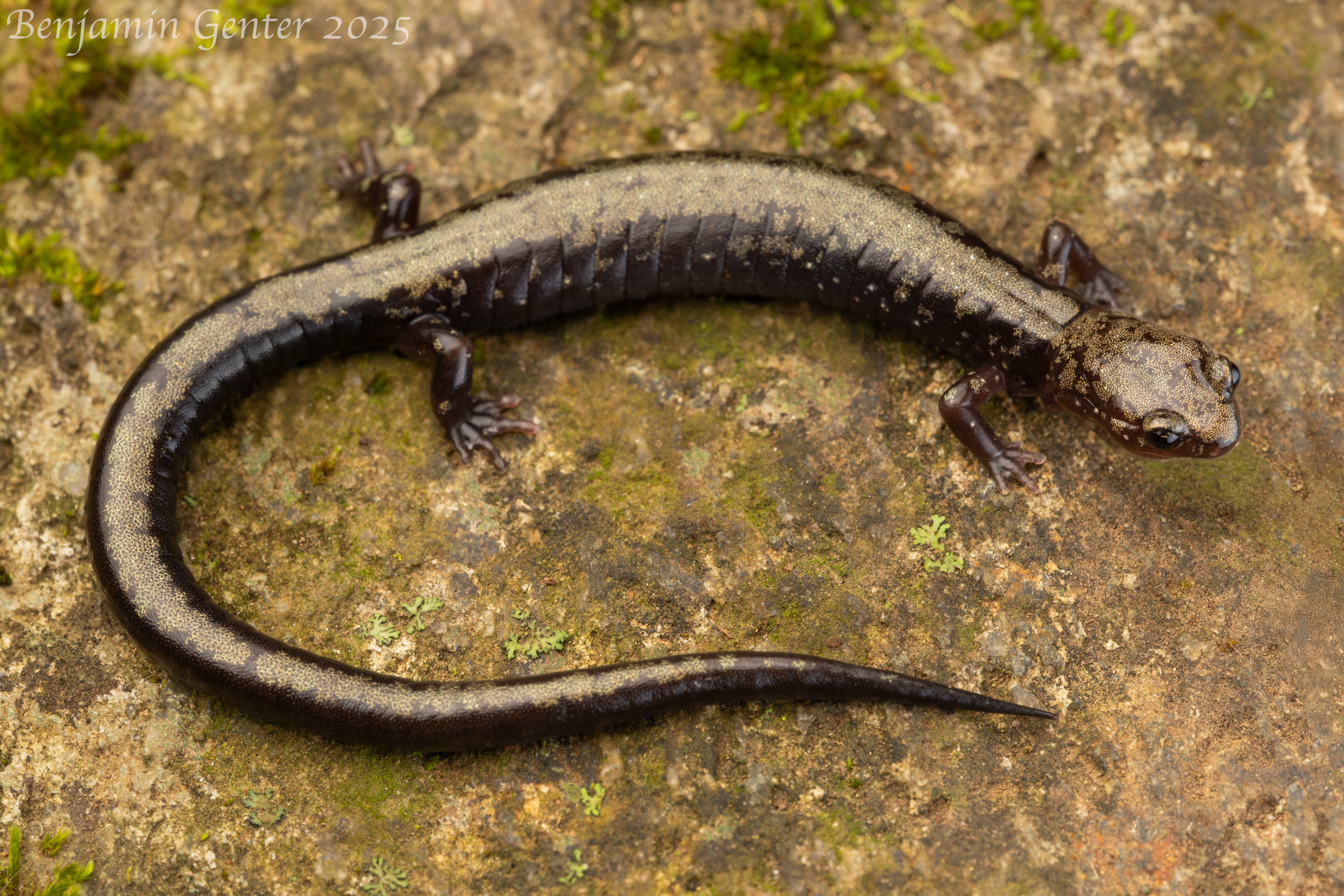

Conservation status
- Vulnerable (IUCN 3.1)

Scientific classification
- Kingdom: Animalia
- Phylum: Chordata
- Class: Amphibia
- Order: Urodela
- Family: Plethodontidae
- Genus: Plethodon
- Species: P. hubrichti

Binomial name
- Plethodon hubrichti Thurow, 1957

= Peaks of Otter salamander =

Species of amphibian

The Peaks of Otter salamander (Plethodon hubrichti) is a species of salamanders in the family Plethodontidae. It is endemic to the Peaks of Otter area in the Blue Ridge Mountains of Virginia. It is a montane salamander found at elevations above 442 m (1,450 ft), but more commonly above 760 m (2,490 ft). It can be locally common, but its distribution is small and patchy. This makes it vulnerable to local threats such as timber harvesting, recreational development, defoliation by gypsy moths, and spraying to control the latter.

== Description ==
The adult Peaks of Otter salamander is characterized by a dark-brown dorsum with heavy brassy flecking down its entire length. The dorsum and sides of P. hubrichti may also be lightly speckled with white, while the venter is not spotted and ranges from light to charcoal grey in color. Males have small mental glands immediately behind the chin. While the Peaks of Otter salamander is superficially similar to the Cheat Mountain salamander (P. nettingi), the two species are differentiated by a higher concentration of metallic flecking on the dorsum of P. hubrichti, and the presence of a usual 19 costal grooves compared to the variable 17–19 costal grooves of P. nettingi. Although Petranka stated that hatchlings have a distinct dorsal stripe consisting of reddish spots, this was never seen in over 100 neonates observed, which have a uniform dark-grey dorsum. Brassy flecks begin to appear when salamanders reach about 25 mm snout-to-vent length.

In the early 1950s, the P. cinereus group of small Plethodon species was made up of only three species: the southern ravine salamander (P. richmondi), the Cheat Mountain salamander (P. nettingi), and the eastern red-backed salamander (P. cinereus). Numerous other members of the genus have since been described, including the Peaks of Otter salamander.

== Naming ==
The story of P. hubrichti's naming began in 1949 with a typewriter salesman, Leslie Hubricht, who also collected and studied land snails. Hubricht encountered salamanders in his pursuit of snails because of their similar habitats, and sent any unusual salamanders he found to museums for identification. Some salamanders he had collected in the Blue Ridge Mountains of Virginia were identified as P. nettingi by herpetologist Gordon Thurow. If true, this would have represented a significant range extension for P. nettingi, since this species had been known only from West Virginia. Richard Hoffman and Richard Highton also examined these specimens, and suspected they actually represented a new species or subspecies.

Hoffman and Highton successfully located Hubricht's collection site about 0.9 miles south of the Black Rock Hill Overlook on the Blue Ridge Parkway, and after collecting and examining 24 of their own specimens, confirmed their suspicions that this was a new species. The two prepared a manuscript describing the salamander, which they designated P. aureolus, and planned to submit the account for publication by December 1956. However, P. aureolus was never to officially exist as the scientific name for the salamander discovered by Leslie Hubricht in the Blue Ridge Mountains. Shortly before Hoffman and Highton's manuscript was submitted, Highton phoned Gordon Thurow, who was in the army at the time, and was stationed near where he lived. Richard invited Gordon and his wife over for dinner at their home. During the phone conversation, Richard told Gordon that he had found Leslie Hubricht's site along the Blue Ridge Parkway and that Gordon had misidentified the specimens Hubricht collected as P. nettingi. Richard also told Gordon that the specimens were of a new species and that he and Richard Hoffman were in the process of describing it. When Gordon and his wife came over for dinner, Richard showed Gordon the new specimens Hoffman and he had collected. During the visit, Gordon never mentioned that right after he received the phone call from Richard Highton, he rushed to Hubricht's collection site and collected some specimens for himself. He then swiftly submitted his own description of this new species, giving the Peaks of Otter salamander its official specific epithet of hubrichti. This less-than-honorable rush to be the first to name this new species, plus other similar events, caused Richard Hoffman, a budding Virginian herpetologist at the time, to look for another group of animals in the forests of Virginia that needed taxonomic work. He decided to work with millipedes.

== Distribution ==
The Peaks of Otter salamander is endemic to a 19-km stretch along the Blue Ridge Parkway in the Peaks of Otter area of the Blue Ridge Mountains in Bedford, Botetourt, and Rockbridge Counties of west-central Virginia. P. hubrichti occupies forest floor habitats and is generally found at elevations above 845 m.

=== Distribution in allopatry ===
When not in sympatry with the Eastern Red-backed salamander (P. cinerus), P. hubrichti surface-active salamander densities decreased with elevation. Reichenbach and Brophy performed a study between 2008 and 2010 on allopatric populations of P. hubrichti at elevations ranging from 488 to 1143 m. They measured eggs/female, % gravid females, surface-active salamander density, temperature and relative humidity. Surface-active salamander densities, survival rates, growth rates, eggs/female and reproductive output decreased with elevation. Decreases were related to increases in temperature and a decrease in relative humidity associated with decline in elevation. Being a montane species, P. hubrichti is affected by even slight changes in the aforementioned environmental factors. This sensitivity to changes in their habitat restricts them from inhabiting lower elevations, where their range may be abiotially limited by the warmer temperatures and drier conditions.

Understanding the reasons why the Peaks of Otter salamander has such a restricted distribution can contribute greatly to its conservation. Previous work has shown that, at optimal elevations in the core of its range, P. hubrichti dominates the salamander community and can be found at high population densities (Reichenbach & Sattler, 2007). At the optimal elevation, when shelterwood cuts were conducted (partial removal of trees), the Peaks of Otter salamander densities did not decline following timbering. If these same shelterwood cuts had been conducted in lower elevation areas, however, the already sparse populations of P. hubrichti might have been adversely affected since the forest canopy would have been opened, likely resulting in increased temperatures and decreased RH. These increased temperatures and decreased RH might exceed or be closer to the tolerable limits for P. hubrichti, which could either extirpate them from these low elevations or reduce densities. Therefore, it is important to conserve mature hardwood forests, particularly in lower elevation areas in the perimeter of the Peaks of Otter salamander distribution, which represent more fragile salamander habitats.

== Reproduction ==
The first observations of a P. hubrichti nest were made in spring and summer of 2005, at a study site near Onion Mountain in Bedford County A cluster of about 10, 5.5-mm-diameter eggs, attended by the brooding female, was found beneath a rock embedded in the soil, hanging from the soil chamber ceiling. After 42–48 days of development, motile embryos with visible eyes were observed in the eggs, and 16 days later, hatchlings were found at the nest site.

The number of eggs per female ranged from 1 to 12 with a mean of 8.5 (95% CI 8.2–8.9). The number of eggs per female P. hubrichti increased directly with mass and elevation to a maximum of 12 eggs per female at 1000 m and then decreased slightly above 1000 m. While females found at higher elevations, near optimal elevations, typically produced more eggs per individual there was a greater percentage of females gravid at lower elevations. Combining data on salamander densities, number of eggs per female, and % gravid females (percentage of females in a population that are carrying eggs) allowed for the calculation of reproductive output for populations of salamanders at various elevations. While females at lower elevations reproduced more frequently than females nearer optimal elevations, the pattern for reproductive output was similar to that seen in eggs per female with reproductive output increasing from low elevations to a maximum near 900 m and then declining beyond that elevation.

== Population ecology ==
In comparison to many other terrestrial plethodontids, the Peaks of Otter salamander has a uniquely small distribution, but it may be locally abundant within its range. The extremely limited range of the species and its narrow environmental requirements put P. hubrichti in a tenuous position - easily threatened by forest disruption. The Peaks of Otter salamander is not distributed evenly within its range, and normal movements of individuals are restricted to approximately 1 m; therefore, any habitat alteration could fragment the population and affect the species' long-term survival. P. hubrichti is estimated to have a population density of 450 salamanders/100 m^{2}, with a median individual home range of 0.6 m^{2}, determined by mark/recapture studies.

Adults and juveniles reside mostly under cover objects, such as rocks and logs, and they are actively territorial in defending these against conspecifics. Neonates and young-of-the-year (YOY) are more likely to be found in the leaf litter. Growth rates for various size classes have been estimated, as well. The YOY salamanders were observed to have a growth rate of 0.10 mm/day, while salamanders initially between 31 and 40 mm SVL had a rate of 0.09 mm/day, and those originally between 41 and 50 mm were observed to grow 0.08 mm/day.

The Peaks of Otter salamander is primarily active at night, between 8:00 and midnight (9–11 pm in spring, 10–12 pm in summer, and 8–11 pm in autumn). Surface-active individuals are most commonly associated with vegetation, when available, and with leaf litter damp from recent rainfall. The proportion of the population active at the surface immediately following a rainfall increases linearly with length of time between rainfall events. Plethodon salamanders feed on invertebrate prey more likely to be found at the surface, but require moist conditions for cutaneous respiration, causing them to retreat underground when surface moisture is lacking. With longer periods of time between rainfalls, salamanders presumably have less access to food and therefore a larger proportion of the population may be observed foraging at the surface after rain.

Comparing P. hubrichti to P. cinereus, a wide-ranging species, provides some understanding as to why P. hubrichti is restricted to higher elevations, great than 488 m. Plethodon cinerus can live in a broader range of temperatures than P. hubrichti, but P. hubrichti can live at lower temperatures than P. cinerus. P. hubrichti has a lower critical thermal maximum (temperature at which the organism cannot function) and higher dehydration rates than P. cinerus, restricting it to higher elevations. Such characteristics allow P. hubrichti to do well in higher elevations but also makes them more susceptible to physiological stress from changes in temperature and humidity. The increases in temperature and decreases in relative humidity could keep P. hubrichti from largely inhabiting lower elevational areas because of decreased foraging efficiency. As poor thermoregulators, they rely on nocturnal activity, burrowing, and refuges such as rocks and logs to achieve the ideal thermal and moisture conditions. The salamanders typically burrow deep into the soil to escape winter cold and summer heat, as well as dry or otherwise unfavorable conditions. Because of their dependence on moisture, they are most active above the surface directly following a rainfall event. In the optimal elevation range (900 to 1000 m), P. hubrichti might be able to primarily forage on top of vegetation where they forage with the greatest efficiency. Poorer environmental conditions at lower elevations force P. hubrichti to forage in less ideal areas such as under rocks and logs to keep from drying out. Such restricted and less efficient foraging along with general physiological stress might result in the decreased reproductive output and survival rates found in salamander populations at lower elevations. Shortened active seasons at elevations above the optimum from decreased temperatures could also influence SA salamander density and reproductive output.

== Community ecology ==
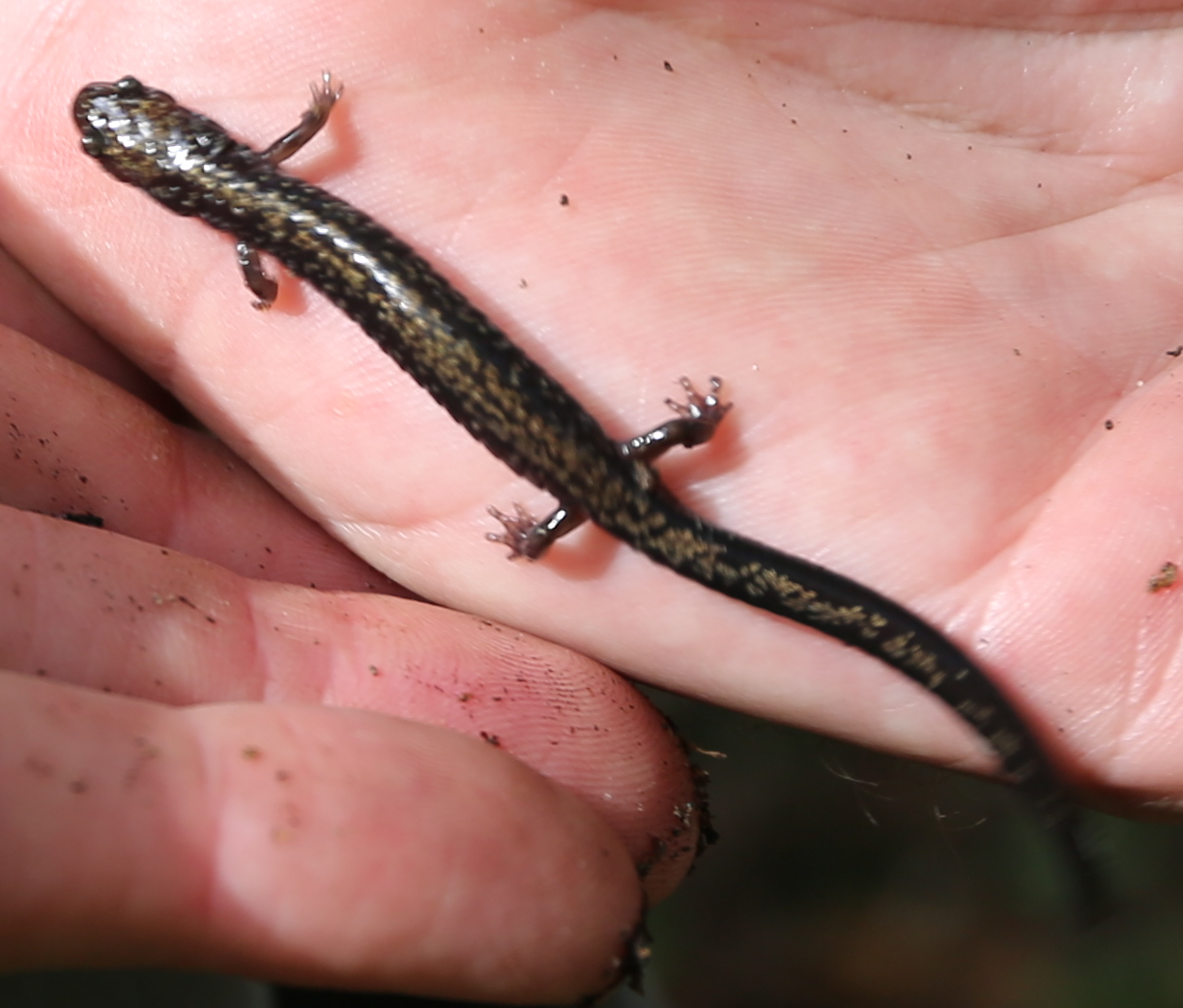
P. hubrichti on a human hand in 2019

For many species, interspecific competition is an important limiting factor of population size, biomass, species richness, and home range sizes. Given the limited distribution of P. hubrichti, it is important to recognize how it may be affected by interspecific competition. The red-backed salamander (P. cinereus), a much more widespread Plethodon, surrounds most of the range of P. hubrichti. Interspecific competition between the Peaks of Otter salamander and the red-backed salamander has generally been considered to limit the distribution of P. hubrichti, since the two species are considered to be equal competitors.

Being closely related Plethodon species, P. cinereus and P. hubrichti demonstrate a number of behavioral similarities in addition to a similarity in size (6.5–12.5 cm and 8–13 cm total length, respectively). These behaviors include nocturnal foraging in humid conditions, preferring prey lacking a hard cuticle; and defense of a limited (<1 square meters) home range consisting of leaf litter surrounding cover objects. Both species demonstrate aggression and territoriality. Linear movements, home ranges, growth rates and adult survival rates were similar for both species, Adult P. hubrichti densities at 13 allopatric sites ranged from 1.6 to 3.3 salamanders/m^{2}, while in sympatry with P. cinereus, it was 0.6/m^{2}. The combined density for both species at one sympatric site (1.1 salamanders/m^{2}), is comparable to nearby densities for P. hubrichti in allopatry. The depressed density for P. hubrichti in sympatry with P. cinereus suggests the splitting of resources through interspecific competition.

The Peaks of Otter salamander may be environmentally restricted, and abiotic climatic features may provide the limiting factor for P. hubrichti, with P. cinereus exhibiting less environmental sensitivity and its range is prevented from encroaching upon allopatric P. hubrichti zones by interspecific competitive with P. hubrichti.

The sympatric zones of the red-backed salamander and Peaks of Otter salamander are relatively static. When species proportions at one sympatric site were compared over a 10-year period at a site where the forest was undisturbed, no significant change was noted, with P. hubrichti comprising about 60-70% of salamanders found. However, much of the rest of the sympatric zone is located within timbering areas, where deforestation may affect the environmental factors involved in the balance of the two species.

To confirm the role of interspecific competition in sympatric areas with P. hubrichti and P. cinereus, removal studies would need to be conducted where P. cinereus is removed from experimental plots to see if P. hubrichti numbers increase similar to what Hairston (1980) found when P. jordani was removed from plots with P. glutinosus.

Plethodontid salamanders such as the Peaks of Otter salamander are responsible for regulating the population of detritivorous invertebrates (i.e. earthworms, etc.) and storing the ecosystem's nutrients. Due to their critical role in forest condition, as well as their susceptibility to habitat disruptions, plethodontid salamander populations are highly indicative of ecosystem health.

== Conservation ==
Plethodon hubrichti is recognized by the USDA Forest Service as a Sensitive Species because of its limited distribution. It does not have any special legal state or federal protection. Where it occurs, the species may be very successful, and holds its own in undisturbed sympatric zones, but the Peaks of Otter salamander may be negatively affected by activities that alter the forest canopy, such as timbering. Long-term (12-year) and short-term (two-year) timbering impacts have been studied and documented in detail.

Plethodontid salamanders are lungless and require moist skin for gas exchange, implying the necessity of moist habitats, which can be altered by canopy loss. The reduction of forest canopy by any sort of timbering has many possible ramifications on P. hubrichti food resources, as well. Peaks of Otter salamanders were able to consume a higher proportion of soft-bodied prey items in mature hardwood stands that had never undergone timbering. Soft-bodied invertebrates, such as collembolans, are a more nutritious source of food, and a diet with a high proportion of these prey items may indicate a higher-quality habitat overall.

== Short-term timbering impacts ==
Sattler and Reichenbach studied the short-term effects of timbering on the Peaks of Otter salamander. Twelve sites were used, with four sites each randomly assigned to one of three treatments: clearcut (complete canopy removal), shelterwood (partial canopy removal), and reference (no timbering). Population baselines were established the year before timbering began, by conducting night mark/recapture surveys of surface-active animals. Establishing a baseline is a vital step in studying timbering effects, as salamander distribution and dispersal patterns may be clumped, and without a preliminary reference point, it may not be possible to separate dispersal effects and individual site differences from timbering effects. Subsequent surveys were conducted in the next year, after timbering was complete and the year following.

Plethodon hubrichti populations were found to remain relatively stable in the shelterwood and reference sites, with the exception of a decrease in the percentage of juveniles in the shelterwood sites. In contrast, the clearcut sites demonstrated a statistically significant decrease in salamander populations. In the second year after clearcutting occurred, only 30% of the baseline population remained at the sites. Estimates of population size from the mark/recapture study demonstrated the progressive decline from year to year in the clearcut sites, contrasted with the steady numbers at the reference site. All surveys were nocturnal and following rainfall, when moisture levels were high; therefore it is unlikely the decreased numbers at the clearcut site were solely due to reduced surface activity following the habitat alteration. Rather, the population decline must be attributed to emigration from the clearcut zones, mortality, or some combination of the two.

Significantly, the juvenile proportion of the population two years after timbering was much smaller in both the clearcut and shelterwood treatments than at the reference sites. This effect is attributed to the reduction in shade and soil moisture with canopy loss having a more marked impact on smaller juvenile animals, due to their larger surface area to volume ratio, which increased their susceptibility to desiccation. In summary, clearcutting was shown to have a significant deleterious effect on P. hubrichti populations in the short term, while shelterwood cuts were not injurious overall. Because of the impact clearcutting has on not only the Peaks of Otter Salamander, but also the forest in general, the George Washington and Jefferson National Forest Service no longer permits clearcutting on the land they manage.

== Long-term timbering impacts ==
A long-term (12-year) study continuing the work of Sattler and Reichenbach (1998) was conducted to assess population trends on a larger time scale. The same treatment sites and study methods were used. Two years after timbering, the numbers of surface-active animals on the clearcut sites had dropped to 25% of levels before timbering. The population did not begin to recover until five years after timbering, and finally stabilized at only 55% of before-timbering levels. Timbering on the shelterwood sites was ultimately not shown to have a significant long-term impact on P. hubrichti populations.

As discussed for short-term timbering effects, population declines in clearcut sites may be attributed to mortality, emigration, or some combination of the two. Immediately after timbering, 41% of the salamanders relocated from transects established at the edge of clearcuts to reference transects that were 3–9 m distant. This was surprising, since Plethodon salamanders are highly philopatric, not typically emigrating long distances under normal circumstances, and P. hubrichti typically has a home range of <1 m^{2}, It is not known if the salamanders would be capable of moving much longer distances to more suitable habitat after clearcuts, nor if they would be capable of surviving in these new locales.

Long-term studies are beneficial for separating the effects of normal population fluctuations from the effects of timbering. Reference site levels of P. hubrichti varied from 0.19 to 0.35 surface-active salamanders/m^{2} during the course of the study, with a complete oscillation over an 11-year period around a mean of 0.28/m^{2}. Had the study been shorter, the population would have appeared to decline overall instead of varying. With this variation at reference sites as a comparison, clearcuts evidently have a significant negative impact on Peaks of Otter salamander populations, with no signs of complete recovery even 12 years after timbering. While shelterwood cuts do not leave the population completely unscathed, they are not harmful in the long term, and if applied judiciously they may be used in allopatric areas where populations of P. hubrichti are otherwise stable.

The most significant timbering question concerns the sympatric zone with P. hubrichti and P. cinereus. Kniowski and Reichenbach hypothesize that timbering, especially clearcuts, would cause an increase in temperature and decrease in moisture on the forest floor, and this, in turn, might favor the more widespread P. cinereus, as this species may be more resistant to increased temperatures and evaporation rates.
