= Spruce, West Virginia =

- Unincorporated community
- Location within West Virginia Location within the United States
- Coordinates: 38°27′24″N 79°57′21″W
- Country: United States
- State: West Virginia
- County: Pocahontas
- Elevation: 3,868 ft (1,179 m)
- Time zone: UTC-5 (Eastern (EST))
  - Summer (DST): UTC-4 (EDT)
- Area codes: 304 & 681
- GNIS feature ID: 1555697

Spruce is a ghost town in Pocahontas County, West Virginia, United States. Spruce is 9.5 miles (15.3 km) southwest of Durbin.

== History ==
Spruce was settled in 1902 along Shavers Fork of Cheat River. The principal industry in the area was logging, and later coal mining. In 1904 the West Virginia Pulp and Paper Company (later known as Westvaco) built a pulp mill nearby. The new community adjacent to the mill was also named Spruce, and the original settlement was renamed "Old Spruce." The Greenbrier and Elk Railroad served the town.

The pulp mill in Spruce closed in 1925, and the equipment was moved to the company's paper mill in Luke, Maryland. Subsequently, the town declined and it eventually was abandoned.

While little remains of the former settlement today, the preservation of a former logging railroad line in the Cass Scenic Railroad State Park has enabled visits to the site.
