= Back Allegheny Mountain =

Mountain ridge in West Virginia, United States

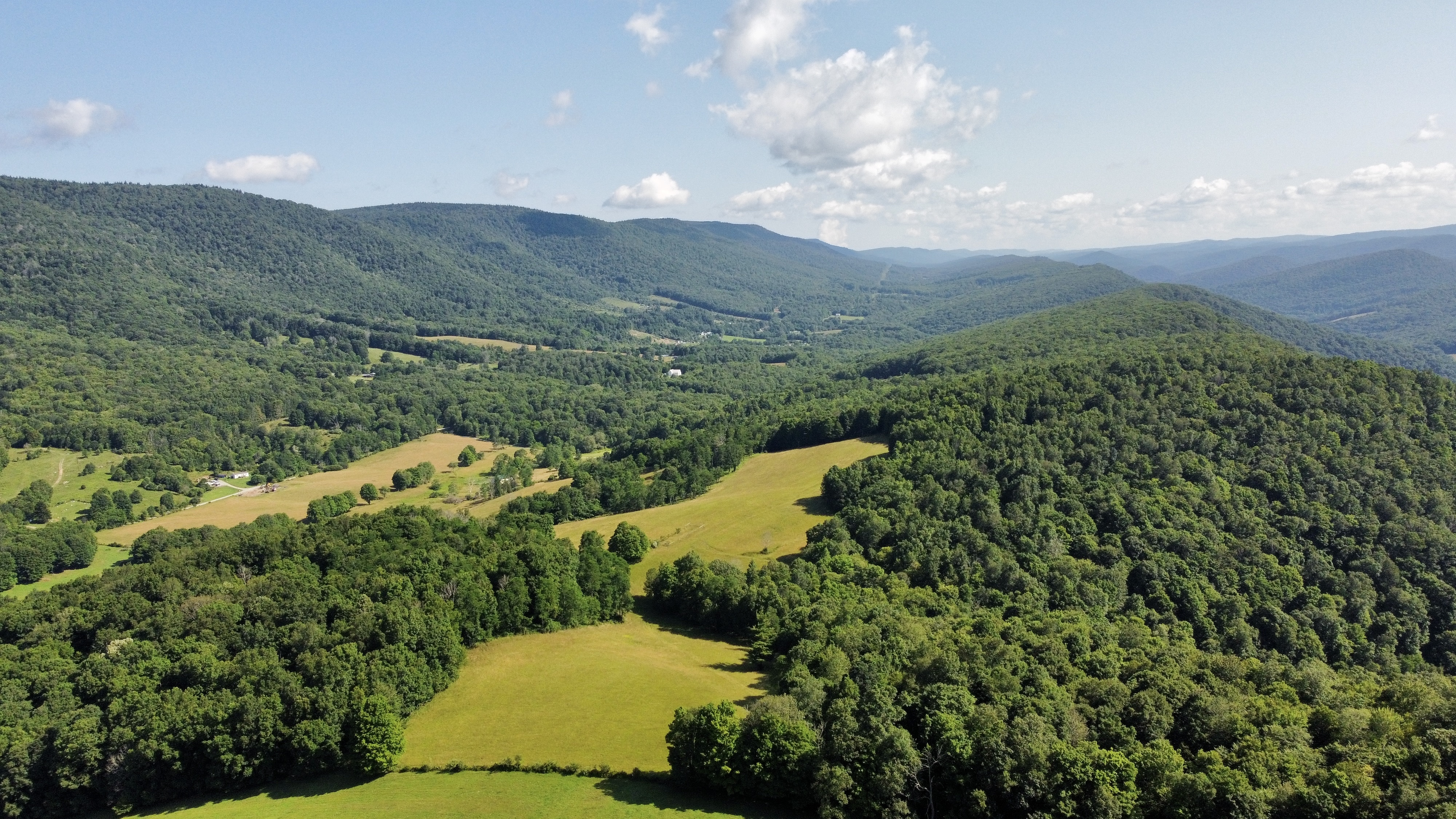
- Back Allegheny Mountain, left, as seen looking north outside Durbin, WV

Highest point
- Peak: Bald Knob, Pocahontas County
- Elevation: 4,843 ft (1,476 m)
- Coordinates: 38°26′52″N 79°55′52″W

Geography
- Location within West Virginia
- Country: United States
- State: West Virginia
- Counties: Pocahontas and Randolph
- Range coordinates: 38°29′30″N 79°54′35″W
- Topo maps: USGS: Cass; Snyder Knob; Durbin

Back Allegheny Mountain is a long mountain ridge in eastern West Virginia. It is part of the Shavers Fork Mountain Complex in the Allegheny Range of the Appalachians.

== Geography ==
Back Allegheny Mountain runs 18 miles (29 km) north to south and 8 miles (13 km) east to west, covering a geographic area of 76 square miles (200 km^{2}). The mountain rises abruptly from the Greenbrier River valley in Pocahontas County, West Virginia, and runs nearly parallel to Cheat Mountain to its west. The mountain reaches its elevational climax of 4,843 feet (1,476 m) at Bald Knob, 5 miles (8.0 km) north of Snowshoe Ski Resort. The second highest point on the mountain is Hosterman Benchmark West at 4,757 feet (1,450 m). Hosterman is approximately 3.3 miles (5.3 km) north of Bald Knob.

North of U.S. Route 250 west of Durbin, the same structural fold of the Earth's crust that forms Back Allegheny Mountain continues north as Shavers Mountain for an additional 35 miles (56 km).

== Preservation and recreation ==
Almost the entirety of Back Allegheny Mountain is protected by the Monongahela National Forest. The summit of Bald Knob is owned by the West Virginia Division of Natural Resources. Back Allegheny and other mountains in the area are known for their extensive red spruce forests, as well as other high altitude plants and animals. The whole of Back Allegheny is an environmentally sensitive area.

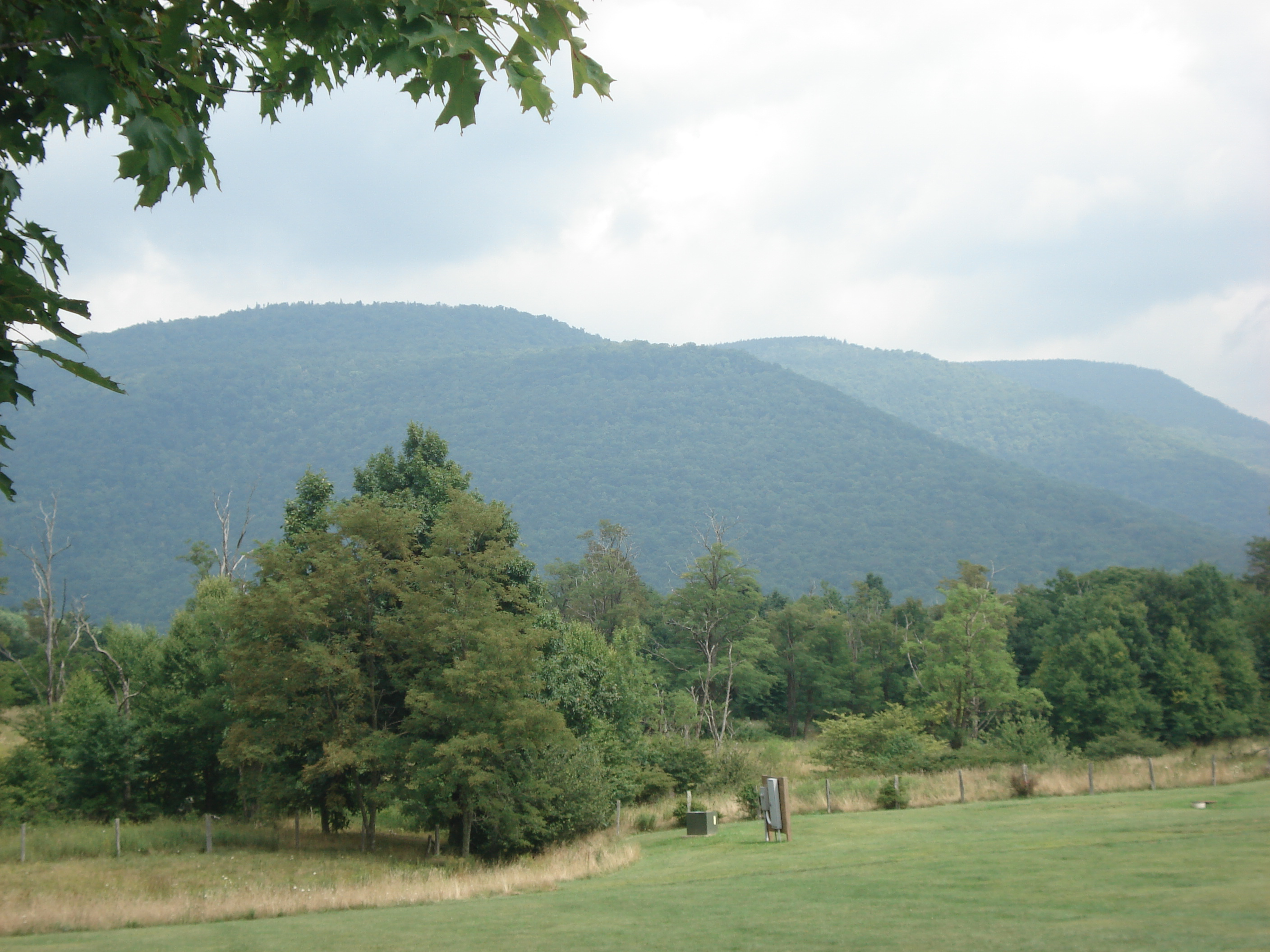
View of Back Allegheny Mountain from Whittaker Station, a stop on the Cass Scenic Railroad

Bald Knob is the terminus of the 11-mile (18 km) long Cass Scenic Railroad State Park. The railroad carries visitors to an elevation of 4,730 feet (1,440 m) approximately 0.25 miles (0.40 km) north of the summit ridge. An overlook platform gives visitors a view of the Greenbrier Valley and, on clear days, a view all the way into Virginia 12 miles (19 km) away.

Snowshoe Mountain Ski Resort is situated in the bowl-shaped convergence of Back Allegheny with Cheat Mountain at the head of Shavers Fork. This area is essentially the southern terminus of both mountains.

== See also ==
- Bald Knob
- Shavers Fork Mountain Complex
- Cass Scenic Railroad State Park
- Cheat Mountain
- Leatherbark Run
