= Cass, West Virginia =

Cass
- Census-designated place (CDP)
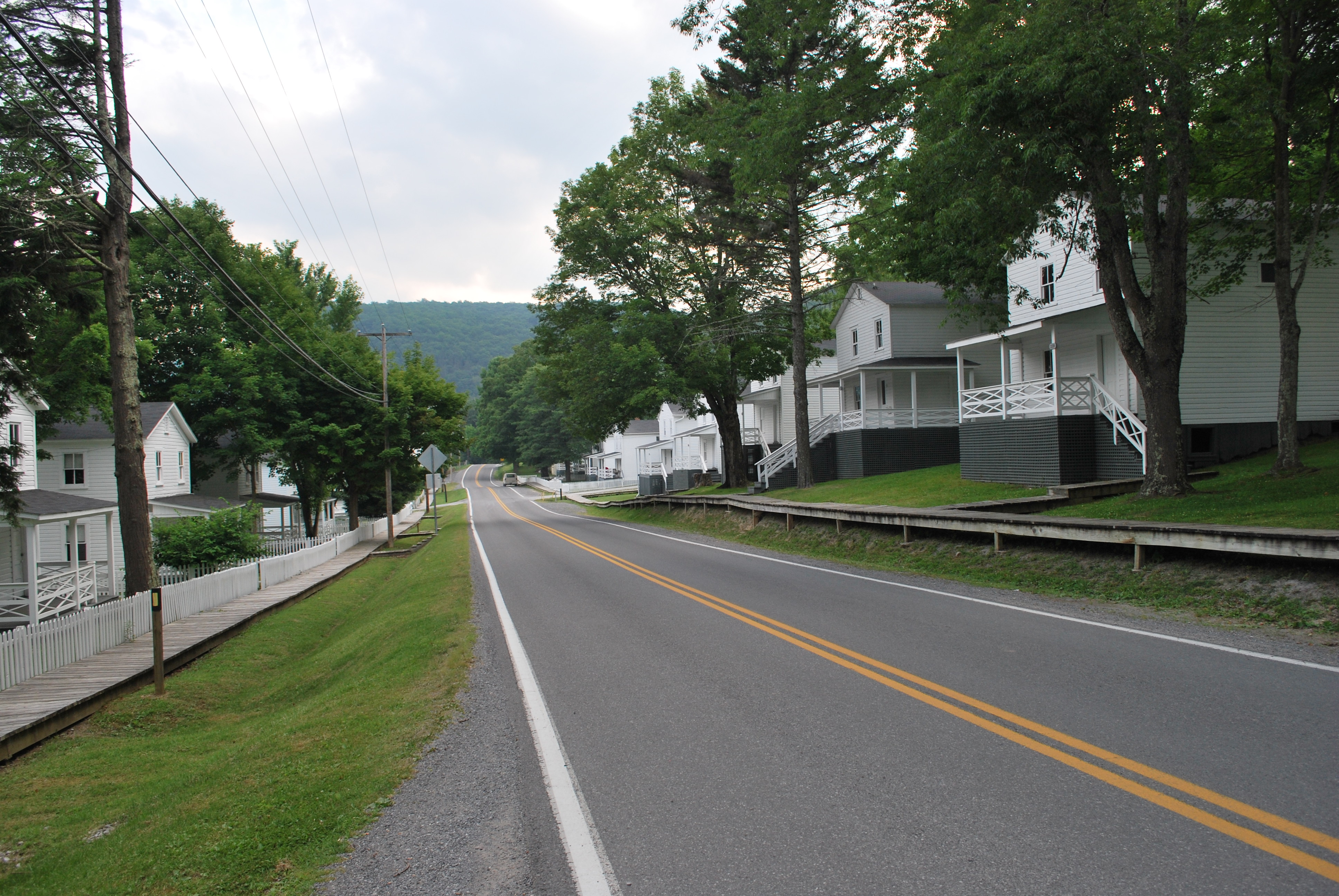
- Main Street in Cass

- Location within the state of West Virginia Cass (the United States)
- Coordinates: 38°23′48″N 79°54′53″W
- Country: United States
- State: West Virginia
- County: Pocahontas
- Incorporated: 1902
- Disincorporated: 1985

Area
  - Total: 0.790 sq mi (2.05 km^{2})
  - Land: 0.790 sq mi (2.05 km^{2})
  - Water: 0 sq mi (0 km^{2})

Population (2020)
  - Total: 38
  - Density: 48/sq mi (19/km^{2})
- Time zone: UTC-5 (Eastern (EST))
  - Summer (DST): UTC-4 (EDT)
- ZIP code: 24927

Cass is a census-designated place (CDP) and unincorporated community on the Greenbrier River in Pocahontas County, West Virginia, United States. The population was 38 at the 2020 census. The community, which was founded in 1901, was named after Joseph Kerr Cass, vice president and cofounder of the West Virginia Pulp and Paper Company.

== History ==
Cass was created in 1901 as a company town for those who worked for West Virginia Pulp and Paper Company, logging the nearby Cheat Mountain. The cut logs were brought by rail to the town, where they were processed for use by paper and hardwood-flooring companies throughout the United States. Cass's skilled laborers, who worked in the mill or the locomotive repair shop, lived with their families in 52 white-fenced houses, built in orderly rows on a hill south of the general store.

In 1960 the mill closed. In 1963, the state bought the logging railroad and converted it into a tourist attraction, carrying passengers into the vast Monongahela National Forest. In the late 1970s, the state bought most of the town and its buildings for the new Cass Scenic Railroad State Park. In 1982 the mill burned down.

The Cass Historic District was listed on the National Register of Historic Places in 1980.

Cass was disincorporated in 1985.

== Current status ==
The community has a general store, a restaurant, a history museum, and 20 houses refurbished for tourist lodgings. Cass Scenic Railroad State Park runs from the town to the halfway point called Whittaker Station. Here a restored loggers' camp has been created on the mountain. Then the railroad continues up the Mountain to Bald Knob (the third highest peak in West Virginia). On Fridays the trains make runs to the ghost town of Spruce, West Virginia (currently not in service). A small number of privately owned homes remain in the area of the community, while the majority of land and homes in Cass is owned by the State of West Virginia.

Cass is the northern terminus of the Greenbrier River Trail.

Cass Cave, located in Cass, contains the highest subterranean waterfall in West Virginia and Virginia, Lacy Suicide Falls.

== In popular culture ==
- The town was featured on Travel Channel's Bizarre Foods with Andrew Zimmern.
- The town was featured in the 2013 film Angel's Perch.
- In 2018, the town was featured in an episode of the PBS series Travels with Darley.

== Demographics ==
Historical population
Census	Pop.	Note	%±
2010	52		—
2020	38		−26.9%
U.S. Decennial Census
