= Plumley Mountain (Raleigh County, West Virginia) =

Mountain in Raleigh County, West Virginia, United States

Highest point
- Elevation: 3,078 ft (938 m)
- Coordinates: 37°48′52″N 80°58′25″W

Geography
- Location: Raleigh County, West Virginia, US
- Topo map: USGS Plumley Mountain

Climbing
- Easiest route: Hiking

Plumley Mountain is a mountain in Raleigh County, West Virginia. The mountain is named for the Plumley family of West Virginia history, and its highest elevation is at Plumley Knob.
