= White Top =

West Virginia place listed on National Register of Historic Places

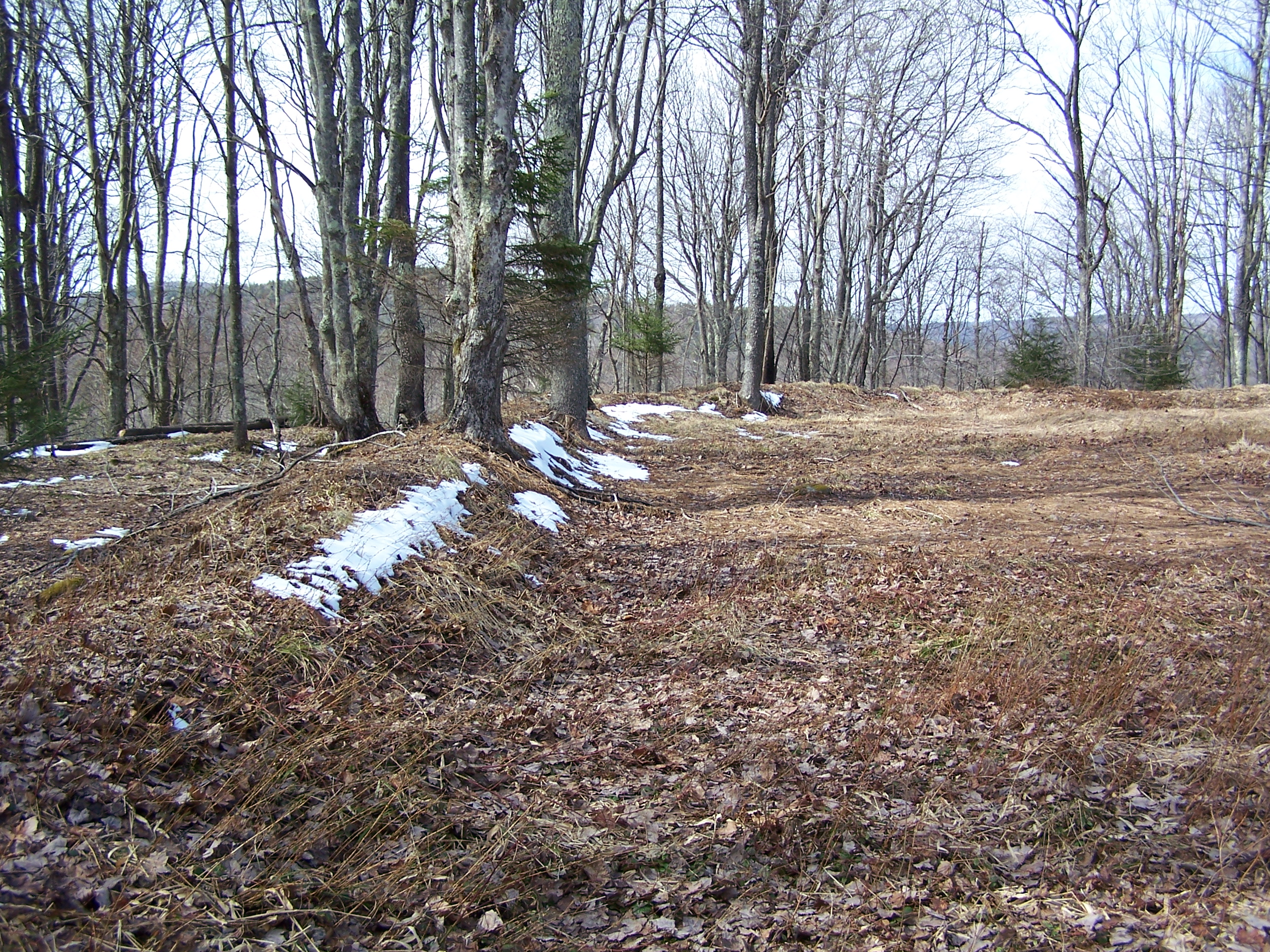
- Earthworks at Cheat Summit Fort (Fort Milroy)

Highest point
- Elevation: 4,085 ft (1,245 m)
- Parent peak: Cheat Mountain
- Coordinates: 38°37′28″N 79°52′36″W

Geography
- Location: Randolph County, West Virginia
- Parent range: Allegheny Mountains
- Cheat Summit Fort
- U.S. National Register of Historic Places
- Location within West Virginia Location within the United States
- Location: County Route 250/4, west of FR 233 at White Top, near Huttonsville, West Virginia
- Area: 34 acres (14 ha)
- Built: 1861
- NRHP reference No.: 90001445
- Added to NRHP: September 28, 1990

White Top is a knob and spur of Cheat Mountain in southeastern Randolph County, West Virginia, USA. Sitting at an elevation of 4,085 feet (1,245 m), it is located just west of the Shavers Fork of Cheat River and Cheat Bridge. While White Top was originally crossed by the Staunton–Parkersburg Turnpike, modern-day U.S. Route 250 skirts the base of the knob beside Shavers Fork to the north and east.

== Cheat Summit Fort (Fort Milroy) ==
White Top is perhaps best known as the site of the highest Union camp during the American Civil War. Fort Milroy, also known as Cheat Summit Fort, offered an excellent view of the surrounding area including the Staunton-Parkersburg Turnpike which crossed about 100 feet (30 m) below the fort. In guarding the Turnpike, Fort Milroy helped to guard entrance to the Tygart Valley River valley to the west.

Construction on Fort Milroy (named for Union Brigadier General Robert H. Milroy) began on July 16, 1861. Due to its high elevation, the Union Army faced a number of winter-related miseries. Snow was first reported for the year on August 13. Horses froze to death in mid-September. These issues, along with some success in driving Confederate forces from the area led to the abandonment of the fort in April 1862. One Indiana soldier is quoted as having said this of their departure: "With what a light step all started. Soon on the road turning at the brow of the hill, the fourteenth took what I fondly hope is their last look at Cheat Mountain."

The Cheat Summit Fort site was listed on the National Register of Historic Places in 1990.

=== Fort Milroy Cemetery ===
A cemetery for those who died at Fort Milroy was built just south of the fort. All bodies were exhumed from the site after the Civil War ended with many being reinterred at West Virginia National Cemetery in Grafton. Depressions from the graves are still visible today.

== Cheat Mountain salamander ==
White Top is also known as the first location where the Cheat Mountain Salamander was identified. This small vertebrate species was identified in 1935 by M. Graham Netting and Leonard Llewellyn. The salamander is found only on Cheat Mountain and adjacent mountains in the West Virginia highlands.

== See also ==
- Battle of Camp Allegheny – Confederate base several miles east on Allegheny Mountain
- Whitetop
