= Cass Scenic Railroad State Park =

State Park in West Virginia, United States

- IUCN category III (natural monument or feature)
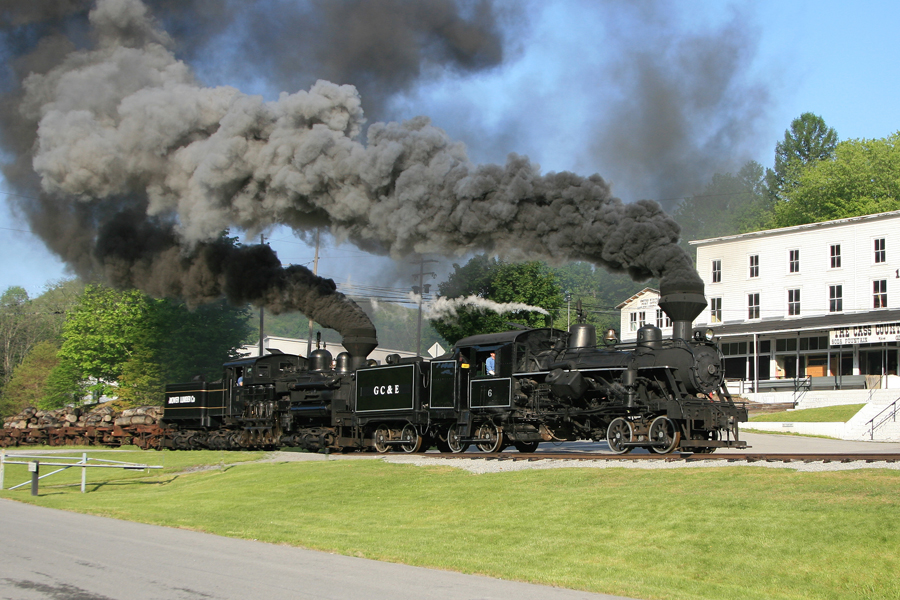
- Cass Scenic Railroad Heisler #6 along with Shay #11 lead a loaded log train down the former C&O Greenbrier Division mainline.

- Location within West Virginia
- Location: Pocahontas County, West Virginia, United States
- Nearest town: Cass, West Virginia
- Coordinates: 38°23′48″N 79°54′53″W
- Area: 940 acres (380 ha)
- Elevation: 2,438 ft (743 m)
- Established: March 7, 1961
- Named for: Former logging railroad at Cass, West Virginia
- Governing body: West Virginia Division of Natural Resources
- Website: wvstateparks.com/park/cass-scenic-railroad-state-park/
- Cass Scenic Railroad
- U.S. National Register of Historic Places
- U.S. Historic district
- Location: Cass, West Virginia
- Built: 1900-1960
- NRHP reference No.: 74002019
- Added to NRHP: July 12, 1974

Cass Scenic Railroad State Park is a state park and heritage railroad located in Cass, Pocahontas County, West Virginia.

It consists of the Cass Scenic Railroad, a 11-mile (18 km) long 4 ft 8+1/2 in (1,435 mm) standard gauge heritage railway owned by the West Virginia State Rail Authority and operated by the Durbin and Greenbrier Valley Railroad. The park also includes the former company town of Cass and a portion of the summit of Bald Knob, the highest point on Back Allegheny Mountain.

== History ==
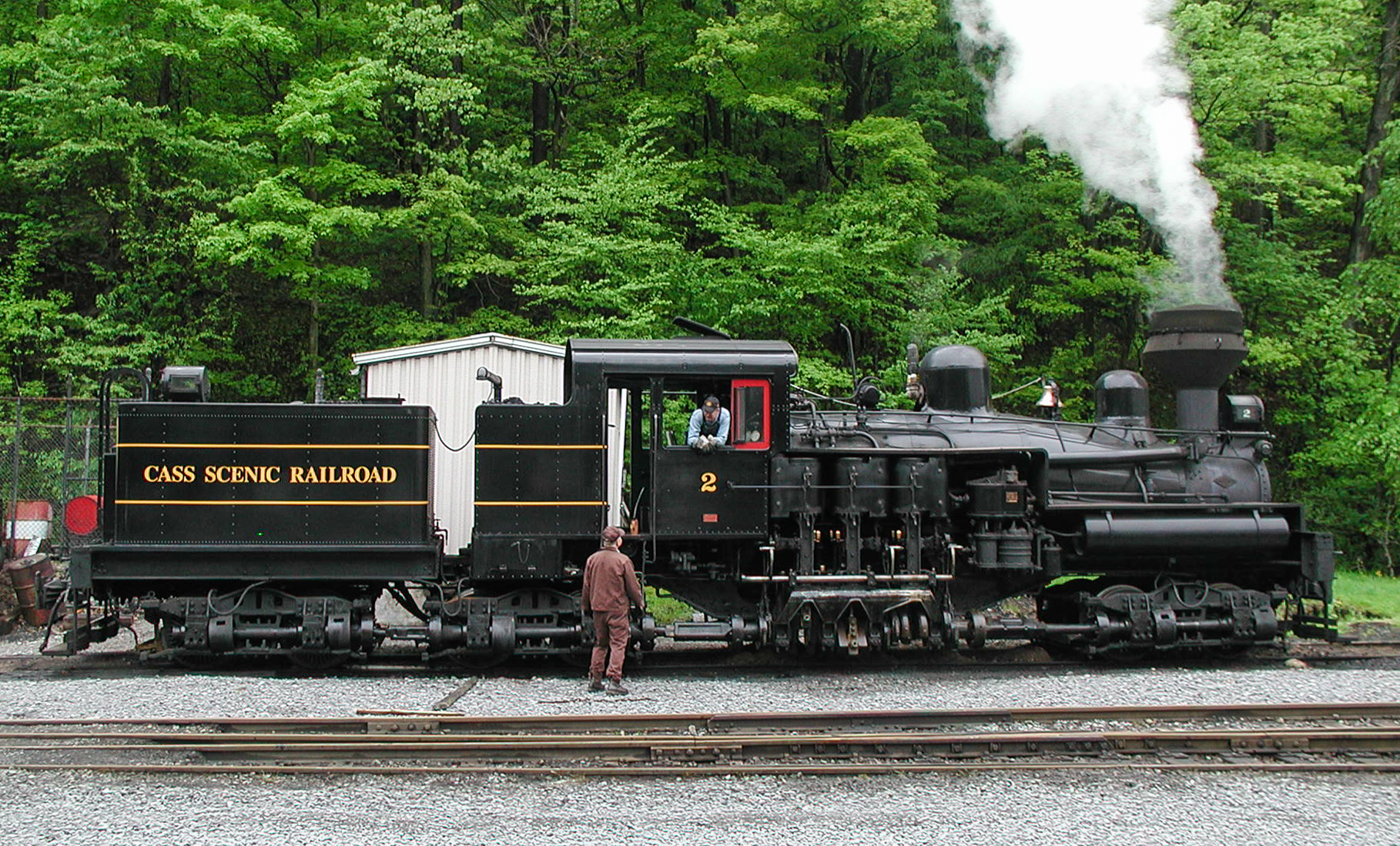
Cass Shay #2 at Cass Station

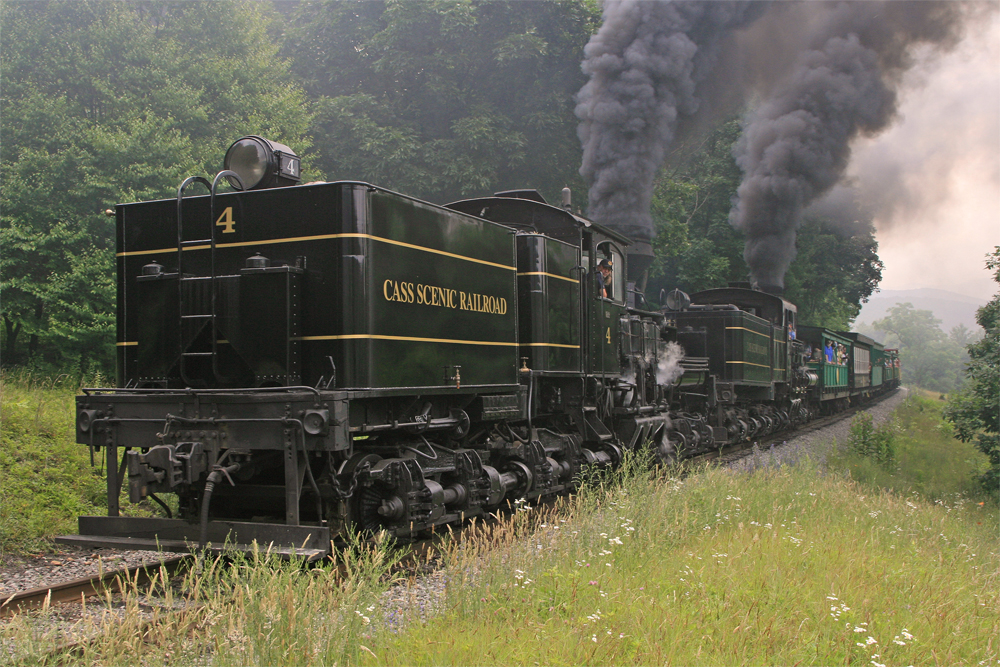
Shay #4 and #11 pull the Bald Knob train up the mountain

Founded in 1901 by the West Virginia Pulp and Paper Company (now WestRock), Cass was built as a company town to serve the needs of the men who worked in the nearby mountains cutting spruce and hemlock for the West Virginia Spruce Lumber Company, a subsidiary of WVP&P. At one time, the sawmill at Cass was the largest double-band sawmill in the world. It processed an estimated 1.25 billion board feet (104,000,000 cu ft; 2,950,000 m^{3}) of lumber during its lifetime. In 1901 work started on the 4 ft 8 1/2 in (1,435 mm) standard gauge railroad, which climbs Back Allegheny Mountain. The railroad eventually reached a meadow area, now known as Whittaker Station, where a logging camp was established for the immigrants who were building the railroad. The railroad soon reached to the top of Gobblers Knob, and then a location on top of the mountain known as 'Spruce'. The railroad built a small town at that location, complete with a company store, houses, a hotel, and a doctor's office. Work soon commenced on logging the red spruce trees, which grew in the higher elevations.

The WVP&P originally had only been interested in the red spruce for the purpose of making pulp, which would be turned into paper. It was not until several years later that the company realized that the mountain held a fortune in hardwoods, such as maple, cherry, birch and oak. The company decided that it would build a mill in the town of Cass, which could process the hardwoods.

The railroad eventually extended its track to the top of Bald Knob, the third-highest mountain peak in West Virginia. The red spruce in that area was logged out, and the track was torn up in the early 1910s. The track was also extended to a valley near the town of Spruce, at a bend in the Shavers Fork of the Cheat River. The WVP&P set up a new town there, with about 30 company houses, a large company store, a school, and a pulp mill, where the red spruce trees could be processed on the spot. The new town was also named Spruce, and the former town received its current name of Old Spruce.

In June 1942, WVP&P sold the Cass operation to Mower Lumber Company, which operated the line until July 1, 1960, cutting second-growth timber off Cheat Mountain. The mill and railroad were shut down by Mower in 1960, due to the rapid decline of the timber industry in the region.

Following the 1960 closure, the rail line, land, and all equipment and rolling stock, were sold to a holding company named the Don Mower Lumber Company (no relation to the former Mower Lumber Company), and the railroad was conveyed to the Midwest Raleigh Corporation, which started to scrap the railroad and equipment. However, a group of local businessmen, led by Pennsylvania train aficionado Russell Baum, convinced the West Virginia state legislature to make the Cass Railroad a state park. In 1963, the first tourist excursion train left the Cass depot for Whittaker Station, 4 miles (6 km) north.

The railroad was placed on the National Register of Historic Places on July 12, 1974.

In 1977, the Cass Scenic Railroad State Park took possession of the entire company town of Cass and the old hardwood mill there. In 2015, the Durbin and Greenbrier Valley Railroad assumed operation of the railroad under a lease agreement with the State of West Virginia.

== Current operations ==
Today, visitors ride on historic converted log cars (similar to flatcars), pushed along by a powerful geared logging locomotive. Traveling on 11 miles (18 km) of standard gauge track laid in 1901 by immigrant workers, the line traverses the steep grades of Back Allegheny Mountain.

The railroad owns eight Shay locomotives, one Heisler locomotive, and one Climax locomotive, which is being restored by volunteers of the Mountain State Railroad and Logging Historical Association. The Heisler and the Climax, both made in Pennsylvania, were competition to Shay's geared locomotive design.

Three trips are available: a two-hour round trip to Whittaker Station, a five and a half hour trip along the Greenbrier River to the town of Durbin, and a five-hour round trip to Bald Knob, the third highest point in the state.

Former company houses have been refurbished and are available for rent through Cass Scenic Railroad State Park. A small cabin on Bald Knob is also available for rent, and cabooses can be reserved for private use as well.

Town and shop tours are available daily to visitors who would like to learn more about the town and its lumber industry, and see how the rare geared locomotives are maintained by the Cass shop crew. A tour of a recreated logging camp is available at Whittaker.

=== 2015 transfer of operations ===
In October 2014, it was announced that the West Virginia Division of Natural Resources (WVDNR) was transferring their administrative responsibilities to another state agency, the West Virginia State Rail Authority (WVSRA). Under the new arrangement, the Durbin and Greenbrier Valley Railroad (D&GV) will assume day-to-day operations of the line as part of their existing contract with the WVSRA. D&GV will control scheduling of trains, staffing train excursions, and maintaining the railroad and its equipment. The takeover began in 2015.

The WVDNR will maintain ownership of the right-of-way and equipment, as well as continue staffing and maintaining the non-railroad portions of the park, including the historic company town of Cass, the visitor center, and the overnight cottage rentals that the park offers. Listed below is a table of locomotives found at Cass and Durbin.

== Locomotives ==
Table of Locomotives Between Cass and Durbin
Image	Cass No.	Type	Manufacturer	Serial No.	Date built	Class	Weight	Status	Notes
	1	Shay	Lima Locomotive Works	1519	Jul 1905	C-65-3	60 short tons (53.6 long tons; 54.4 metric tons)	Display	On loan to B&O Museum in exchange for WM 6.
	2	Shay	Lima Locomotive Works	3320	Jul 1928	PC-13	92 short tons (82.1 long tons; 83.5 metric tons)	Operational	In service
	3	Shay	Lima Locomotive Works	3142	Dec 1920	C-80-3	82 short tons (73.2 long tons; 74.4 metric tons)	Display	Not operational
	3	Climax	Climax Locomotive Works	-	1910	B-55-2	80 short tons (71.4 long tons; 72.6 metric tons)	Out of service, awaiting overhaul	Awaiting 1,472-day inspection
	4	Shay	Lima Locomotive Works	3189	Dec 1920	C-70-3	85 short tons (75.9 long tons; 77.1 metric tons)	Operational	First locomotive used for the railroad's inauguration of excursion services in 1963
	4	2-8-0	Baldwin Locomotive Works	59472	Sep 1926	Ks	80 short tons (71.4 long tons; 72.6 metric tons)	Under restoration	New boiler is needed. Built initially for Mexico, but bought by Buffalo Creek & Gauley.
	5	Shay	Lima Locomotive Works	1503	Nov 1905	C-80-3	86 short tons (76.8 long tons; 78.0 metric tons)	Operational	WV state locomotive, oldest operational Shay in the world
	6	Heisler	Heisler Locomotive Works	1591	1929	C-90-3	100 short tons (89 long tons; 91 metric tons)	Operational	In service
	6	Shay	Lima Locomotive Works	3354	May 1945	C-150-3	162 short tons (145 long tons; 147 metric tons)	Operational	Ex-Western Maryland Railway No. 6; Cass's largest engine, largest surviving Shay in existence, last Shay ever built.
	7	Shay	Lima Locomotive Works	3131	Oct 1920	C-70-3	65 short tons (58.0 long tons; 59.0 metric tons)	Awaiting restoration	Not operational
	8	2-8-0	Baldwin Locomotive Works	24738	1904	-	N/A	Stored, awaiting restoration	Built for West Virginia Northern.
	9	2-8-0	Baldwin Locomotive Works	28500	1906	-	N/A	Inoperable, stored	Built for West Virginia Northern. Currently stored, awaiting restoration
	9	Climax	Climax Locomotive Works	1551	1919	C-70-3	-	Operational	Restoration completed in September 2019.
	10	Shay	Lima Locomotive Works	2804	Jan 1916	C-70-3	62 short tons (55.4 long tons; 56.2 metric tons)	Inoperable, stored	Ex-Brimstone Railroad No. 36, not operational, awaiting restoration
	11	Shay	Lima Locomotive Works	3221	Jul 1923	C-90-3	105 short tons (94 long tons; 95 metric tons)	Operational	Ex-Hutchinson Lumber Co./Feather River Railway No. 3; occasionally pulled excursions at the Pacific Southwest Railway Museum from 1965–91; acquired by Cass in 1998 and restored the following year
	-	Shay	Lima Locomotive Works	3299	Feb 1926	C-70-3	70 short tons (62.5 long tons; 63.5 metric tons)	Inoperable	Not operational, Ex-Graham County Railroad 1926. Acquired for parts.

== See also ==
- Bald Knob
- Leatherbark Run
- List of heritage railroads in the United States
- List of West Virginia state parks
- Steam railroad
