= Snowshoe Mountain =

Ski area in West Virginia, United States

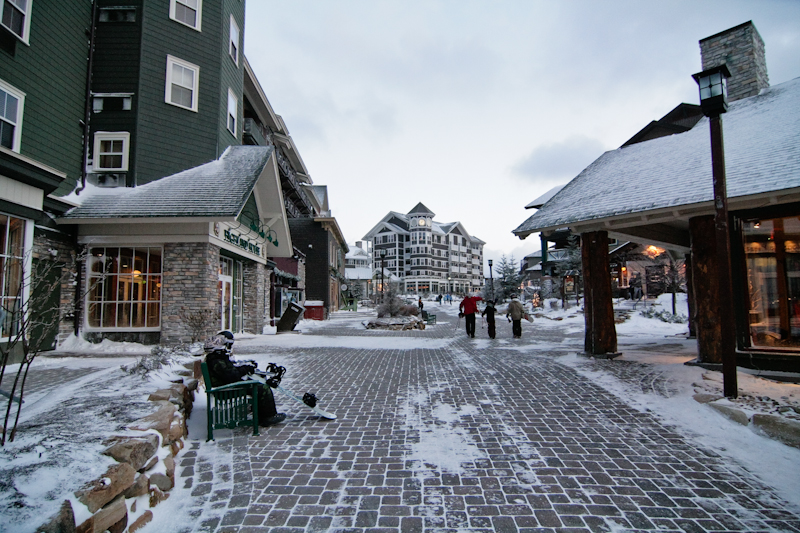
- The Village at Snowshoe in 2009

- Location in the United States
- Location: Pocahontas County, West Virginia
- Nearest city: Marlinton and Lewisburg to the south Elkins to the north
- Coordinates: 38°24′32″N 79°59′41″W
- Status: Operating
- Owner: Alterra Mountain Company
- Vertical: 1,500 ft (460 m)
- Top elevation: 4,848 ft (1,478 m)
- Base elevation: 3,348 ft (1,020 m)
- Skiable area: 244 acres (99 ha)
- Trails: 60
- Longest run: 1.5 miles (2.4 km)
- Lift system: 14 chairlifts
- Lift capacity: 23,400 skiers per hour
- Snowfall: 180 inches (460 cm)
- Snowmaking: Yes, 100%
- Night skiing: Yes, at the Silver Creek area
- Website: snowshoemtn.com

Snowshoe Mountain is a ski resort in the eastern United States, located in Snowshoe, West Virginia. The resort has skiable terrain across 244 acres (99 ha) and covers a total area of 11,000 acres (44.5 km^{2}) in the Allegheny Mountains, which are a part of the vast Appalachian Mountain Range. It is positioned in the bowl shaped convergence of two mountains, Cheat and Back Allegheny, at the head of the Shavers Fork of the Cheat River.

The Village at Snowshoe is located close to the summit of the mountain, rather than at its base. While Snowshoe is still best known for its winter activities, today the resort has extensive mountain biking trails, a popular golf course designed by Gary Player, wedding and convention areas, a number of summer outdoor activities, and also hosts a Grand National Cross Country Racing event each year. The resort comprises the Snowshoe and Silver Creek ski areas. About 480,000 skiers visit the resort each year, primarily from the larger cities of the Mid-Atlantic and Southeast and from across West Virginia.

== Mountain ==
Snowshoe Mountain is the name of the resort, not the name of the mountain itself; the resort is located on Cheat Mountain. Cheat's privately owned highpoint is Thorny Flat, which reaches an elevation of 4,848 feet (1,478 m). The resort makes up 244 acres (99 ha) in total, which includes the Snowshoe Mountain and Silver Creek areas; the mountains have a total of 60 slopes and trails plus many acres of backcountry. Two trails, Cupp Run and Shay's Revenge, have a 1,500 feet (457 m) vertical drop, the highest in the Southeast and Mid-Atlantic. The former was designed in part by Jean-Claude Killy, the triple gold medalist at the 1968 Winter Olympics. The mountain summit receives an average of 180 inches (460 cm) of snowfall each winter.

Snowshoe had originally been envisioned as a four season destination, although it would take years for mountain bike and horseback riding trails to become a significant draw. One key advantage for the mountain has continued to be its lower temperatures, due to its elevation. With a mean temperature of 28 °F (−2.2 °C) in January and 68 °F (20.0 °C) in July, Snowshoe can be considerably cooler than nearby areas at lower elevations.

The resort has a base of 1,400 condominium and lodge hotel units, most of which are independently owned but managed by the resort. The average winter season is just slightly more than 130 days each year, while the spring, summer, and fall seasons typically include a series of sports, recreation, and cultural events.

== History ==
Starbucks in the Snowshoe Village.

Snowshoe Mountain opened for skiing 51 years ago on December 13, 1974. The area had been logged from about 1905 to 1960, after which it was virtually barren and abandoned. Thomas "Doc" Brigham discovered the mountain and believed it would be a good location to build a new ski resort. Brigham, a dentist from North Carolina, had previously opened the Sugar Mountain and Beech Mountain ski areas.

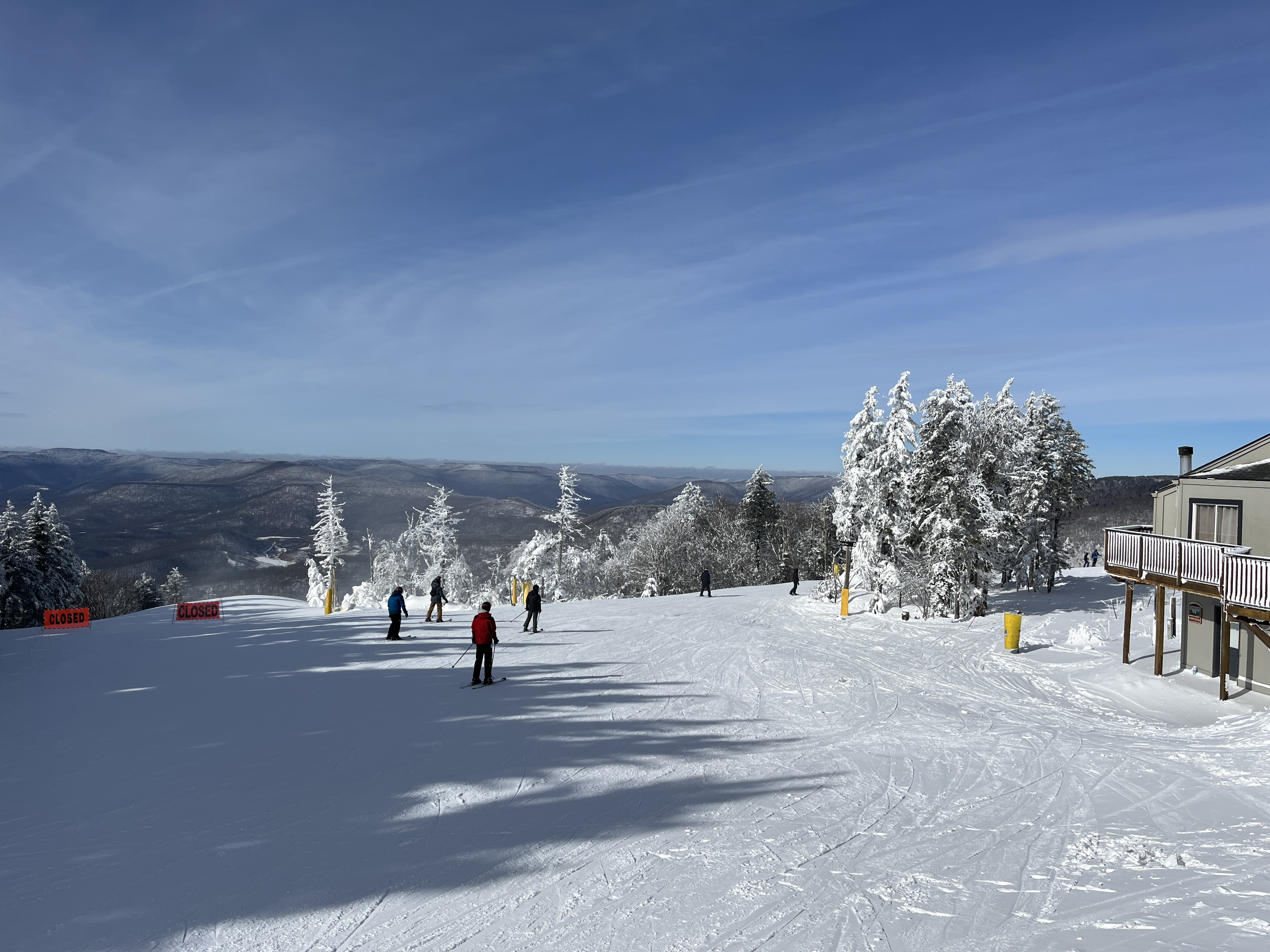
View from the top of the Western Express lift

The ski trails and lifts were given names that recalled the local history of logging, such as Grab Hammer, J-Hook, Ball Hooter, and Skidder. Two trails, Shay's Revenge and Heisler Way, were named for brands of gear-driven steam locomotives that ferried men and logs around the mountains during the logging era. Examples of these locomotives now push tourist excursion trains (the cars themselves were once logging flat cars) on adjacent land at nearby Cass Scenic Railroad State Park.

In the late 1980s, the prominent businessman Fred Haddad and a consortium of four other businessmen purchased the Silver Creek resort and in turn sold it to two Charleston realtors.

Although Brigham had high hopes for Snowshoe, the mountain went through a difficult first decade plagued by financial problems. Over the next several years, though, the resort's reputation and popularity would grow, and in 1992 it purchased the Silver Creek ski area which is just a half mile away.

The resort was purchased in 1990 by Tokyo Tower Development Company Limited, a Japanese developer of leisure and recreational facilities. Five years later in 1995, it was sold to Intrawest, a Canadian ski-resort operator which had become well known for expanding mountain resorts through village-style commercial and condominium real estate development. In 1999, Intrawest opened the Rimfire Lodge, its first development in what it called "The Wildcat Village" (a name which later fell out of use). The village expanded rapidly, with additional condominium-hotel developments opening over the coming years, including Highland House, two phases of Allegheny Springs, The Seneca, and Expedition Station. One development, Eight Rivers, was to have broken ground in 2007, but the project was eventually postponed and the land area is now used by a small surface ski lift used, in part, by the resort's ski school. In 2017, Intrawest was acquired by Alterra Mountain Company.

In addition to the central village, Intrawest has also assisted developing "outside neighborhoods," including Soaring Eagle Lodge in 2006 and Sawmill Village in 2007, both of which were developed independently. In 2006, Intrawest was acquired by the private equity firm Fortress Investment Group. Intrawest continues to operate as an independent unit of Fortress.

== Mountain Biking ==
The Snowshoe Bike Park is considered one of the largest, best, and most challenging parks in the world. Snowshoe is a regular stop on the UCI Mountain Bike World Cup. Snowshoe's downhill track is considered one of the hardest courses on the circuit. The track is located on the Western Territory, the other face of the mountain. It runs through many roots, rocks, and jumps, one of which, by the curious name of "Threading the Needle," runs through a narrow gap between two trees. This is widely recognized as Snowshoe's biggest attraction.

== Other Names ==
"McGill Mountain" named after WV native, and ATV racing Legend Adam "Gator" McGill.

== See also ==
- Snowshoe, West Virginia
- Pocahontas County, West Virginia
