= West Virginia Northern Railroad =

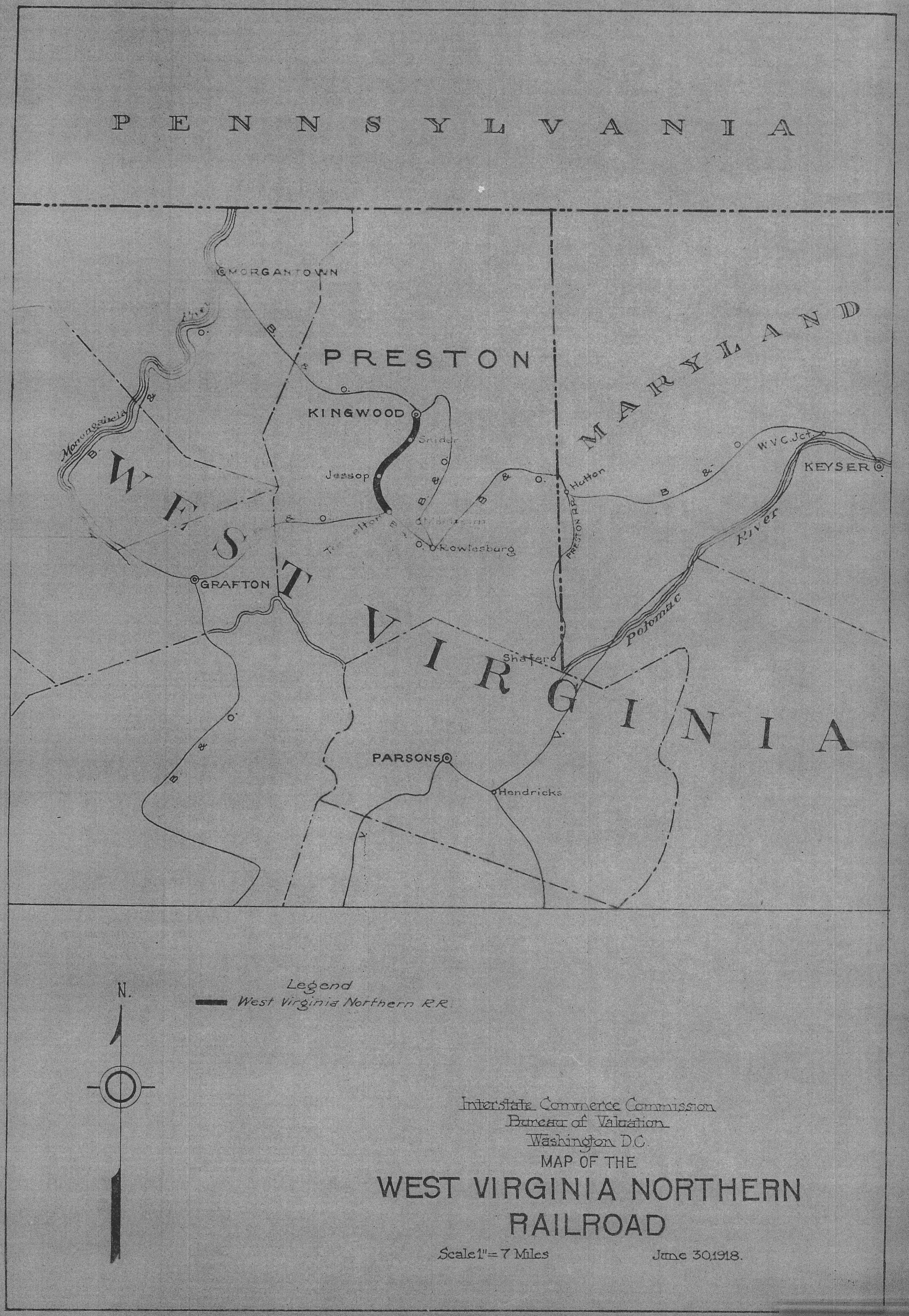
1918 map of the railroad

The West Virginia Northern Railroad (WVN) was a short line railroad that ran from Kingwood to Tunnelton in Preston County, West Virginia. It operated from 1886 to 1991.

From the beginning of its existence through February 19, 1991, the railroad had but one purpose — to bring loads of coal from the mines of Preston County to the B&O interchange at Tunnelton for shipment to points far removed from the mountains of Appalachia. Until the late 1980s West Virginia Northern crews could be found somewhere along its roller coaster route switching its numerous coal tipples.

The line became a tourist railroad in August 1994, operated by Kingwood Northern, Inc. The tourist operation ran until 1999, when its "First Annual Railfan Weekend" was abruptly announced to be its final run. Locomotives and equipment remained on site until 2002, when the two remaining locomotives unceremoniously ran the line one final time under their own power from Kingwood shops to the CSX interchange at Tunnelton, where they were picked up and moved to a Pittsburgh suburb for storage (they were moved again in 2005 to Eighty Four, Pennsylvania). Tracks were removed by 2005, leaving behind sparse evidence that a railroad ever existed there, with the exception of the trackless Kingwood shop area and ties stored near the former site of Marion Siding.

== Disposition ==
As of 2020, the Preston County Parks & Recreation Commission is in the planning and development phase of creating the West Virginia Northern Rail Trail, after the right of way was acquired from the Kern Valley Railroad, who had purchased the line in the early 2000s for its scrap resources. Most of the structures at the former Kingwood Junction yard were removed in the late 2010s, although plans are in place to re-construct the old water tower in a slightly different location as the "gateway" for the new recreational trail.

== Virtual Train Simulator ==
In 2017, the Virtual New Haven RR, a group that had previously developed a recreation of the New Haven Railroad's Springfield line for Dovetail Games' Train Simulator (now Train Simulator Classic), released a new Train Simulator route based on the West Virginia Northern Railroad and surrounding topography and features. The route, released as the "B&O Kingwood Branch", includes nearly identical re-creations of the Kingwood Junction and Tunnelton yards, as well as a fairly accurate representation of the prototype railroad between the two points, inclusive of the double switchback, towns, grade crossing locations, and coal mines along the route. The route and its parent game can be acquired through Dovetail Games and Steam.

== Sources ==
- RBLXRR site (owners of WVNRR locomotives)
- Preston Count Parks and Recreation Commission - WV Northern Rail Trail
