= Cheat Mountain =

Mountain in West Virginia, United States

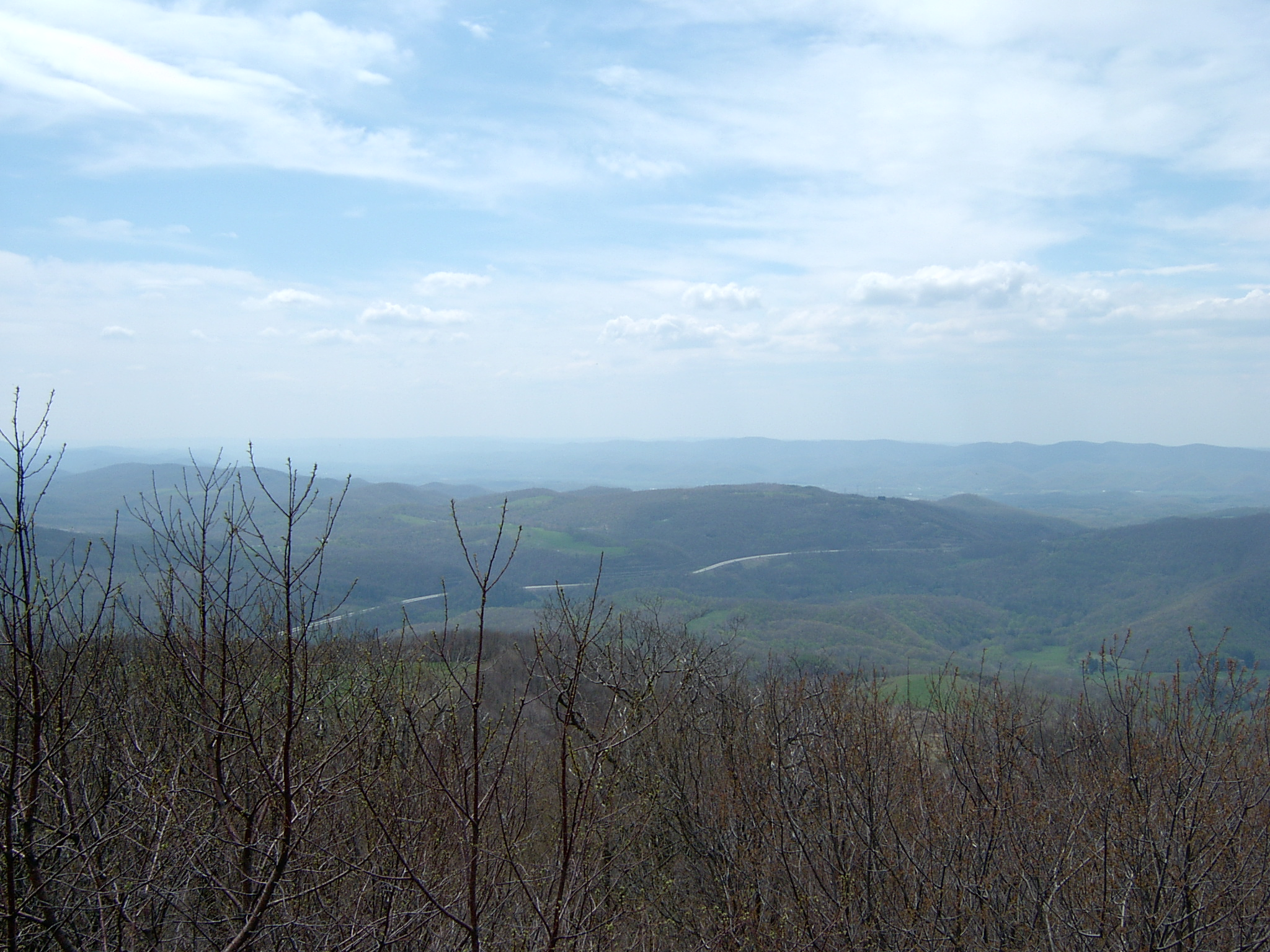
- View of US 33 crossing Cheat Mountain (in distance)

Highest point
- Peak: Thorny Flat, Pocahontas County, West Virginia
- Elevation: 4,848 ft (1,478 m)
- Coordinates: 38°23′37″N 79°59′02″W

Dimensions
- Length: 50 mi (80 km)

Geography
- Location within West Virginia
- Location: Cheat Mountain in Randolph County, West Virginia
- Country: United States
- State: West Virginia
- Counties: Pocahontas; Randolph; Tucker
- Range coordinates: 38°38′28″N 79°54′47″W
- Topo maps: USGS: Snyder Knob; Mingo; Cass; Mill Creek; Wildell; Beverly East; Elkins; Montrose

Cheat Mountain is an exceptionally high and rugged ridge situated in the Allegheny Mountains of eastern West Virginia, USA. It is about 50 miles (80 km) long (north to south) and more than five miles (8 km) wide at its widest. Its highest point is at its southernmost end at Thorny Flat, which has an elevation of 4,848 feet (1,478 m). Several other knobs rise above 4,000 feet (1,200 m) along its length.

The mountain was once home to the largest red spruce forest south of Maine and a large portion of it now lies within the Monongahela National Forest.

== Geography ==
Cheat Mountain traverses the entire length of central Randolph County, West Virginia, from a northern point just west of Parsons to a southern point about 5.5 miles (8.9 km) south of the Randolph/Pocahontas county line, near the community of Stony Bottom, where it impinges upon Back Allegheny Mountain. All but the northernmost 4 miles (6.4 km) and the southernmost 5.5 miles (8.9 km) are within Randolph County. The western flank of Cheat Mountain is skirted by U.S. Route 219 which connects a string of communities in the Tygart River Valley (notably, from north to south, Montrose, Kerens, Elkins, Beverly, Huttonsville and Valley Head). The eastern flank, overlooking the valley of Shavers Fork, is more remote. However, all but the northernmost 15 miles (24 km) or so of it is skirted by the Western Maryland Railroad, connecting (from north to south) the communities of Bowden, Bemis and Cheat Bridge. Cheat Mountain is crossed (east/west) by two federal highways: U.S. Route 33 in its northern third and U.S. Route 250 in its southern third.

The Cheat River, a tributary of the Monongahela, is formed at Parsons, just east of the northern tip of Cheat Mountain, by the confluence of Shavers Fork and Black Fork.

== History ==
=== Civil War ===
Cheat Mountain was strategically important during the early Operations in Western Virginia campaign of the American Civil War. One engagement — the Battle of Cheat Mountain — took place here September 12–15, 1861.

Gen. Robert E. Lee directed his first offensive of the Civil War against Brig. Gen. Joseph Reynolds’s entrenchments on the summit of Cheat Mountain. The Confederate attacks were uncoordinated, however, and the Federal defense was so stubborn that Col. Albert Rust (who led the attacks) was convinced that he confronted an overwhelming force, when he actually faced only about 300 determined Federals. Lee called off the attack and, after maneuvering in the vicinity, withdrew to Valley Head on September 17, 1861. During the night of October 2–3, Reynolds with two brigades advanced from Cheat Mountain to reconnoiter the Confederate position at Camp Bartow on the Greenbrier River. He drove in the Confederate pickets and opened fire with his artillery. After sporadic fighting and an abortive attempt to turn his enemy's right flank, Reynolds withdrew to Cheat Mountain. Also in October, Lee renewed operations against Laurel Mountain with the troops of Floyd and Loring, but the operation was called off because of poor communication and lack of supplies. Lee was recalled to Richmond on October 30 after achieving little in western Virginia.

In December, Confederate forces under Col. Edward Johnson occupied the summit of nearby Allegheny Mountain to defend the Staunton-Parkersburg Turnpike. A Union force under Brig. Gen. Robert Milroy attacked Johnson on December 13. Fighting continued for much of the morning as each side maneuvered to gain the advantage. Finally, Milroy's troops were repulsed, and he retreated to his camps near Cheat Mountain. At the end of 1861, Johnson remained at Camp Allegheny with five regiments, with Henry Heth at Lewisburg with two regiments.

The highest Union camp of the War was located at Cheat Summit, also known as White Top, at the southern end of Cheat Mountain. This commanding stronghold controlled the Staunton-Parkersburg Turnpike as it passed west into the Tygart River Valley. Cheat Summit Fort (Fort Milroy) was occupied from July 16, 1861, until April 1862 when it was abandoned due to extremes of weather as well as strategic developments.

An account of the Civil War activity on Cheat Mountain can be found in Ambrose Bierce's article "On A Mountain".

=== Logging era ===
The West Virginia timber industry grew rapidly toward the turn of the 20th century. In the early 1900s, Cheat was extensively timbered by the West Virginia Pulp and Paper Company and its Cass operation, West Virginia Spruce Lumber Company. By 1905, the summit had been reached by loggers and by 1960 the mountain was virtually barren. The timbering of Cheat has been chronicled in many books. Notable is W. E. Blackhurst's Of Men and A Mighty Mountain (1965) which details how difficult life was on the mountain for the mostly immigrant workers of the lumber operation.

=== Tourist era ===
A state park and tourist service, Cass Scenic Railroad State Park, opened in 1960 and takes visitors up the side of Cheat Mountain to Bald Knob via the same route the logging railroad used in the 1900s. (Contrary to popular belief, Cass Railroad does not take visitors to the summit of Cheat Mountain, but rather the summit of the connected Back Allegheny Mountain.)

In 1974, the Snowshoe Mountain ski resort opened on the southern tip of Cheat Mountain near Thorny Flat.

== See also ==
- Barton Knob
- Cheat Mountain salamander
- List of subranges of the Appalachian Mountains
- White Top
