= Thorny Flat =

Mountain in West Virginia, United States

- Location within West Virginia Location within the United States

Highest point
- Elevation: 4,848 ft (1,478 m)
- Prominence: 1,688 ft (515 m)
- Coordinates: 38°23′37″N 79°59′02″W

Geography
- Location: Pocahontas County, West Virginia, U.S.
- Parent range: Alleghany Mountains
- Topo map: USGS Cass

Climbing
- First ascent: Prehistoric
- Easiest route: Hike

Thorny Flat (4,848 feet (1,478 m)) is the second highest peak in the U.S. state of West Virginia, after Spruce Knob. Thorny Flat is the high point of the ridge known as Cheat Mountain.
