= Sports in Richmond, Virginia =

Richmond, Virginia, United States, is home to three professional sports teams, though none of which compete in any major professional league. Virginia is the most populated state without a major sports team. In 2008, the Richmond Braves minor league baseball team left for Gwinnett County, Georgia, and was replaced by the Richmond Flying Squirrels in 2010. The Flying Squirrels' owner previously threatened to leave Richmond if they did not replace their stadium, the Diamond. The Diamond was replaced in 2026 with the opening of CarMax Park. The Richmond Kickers are a non-profit soccer team that plays at City Stadium.

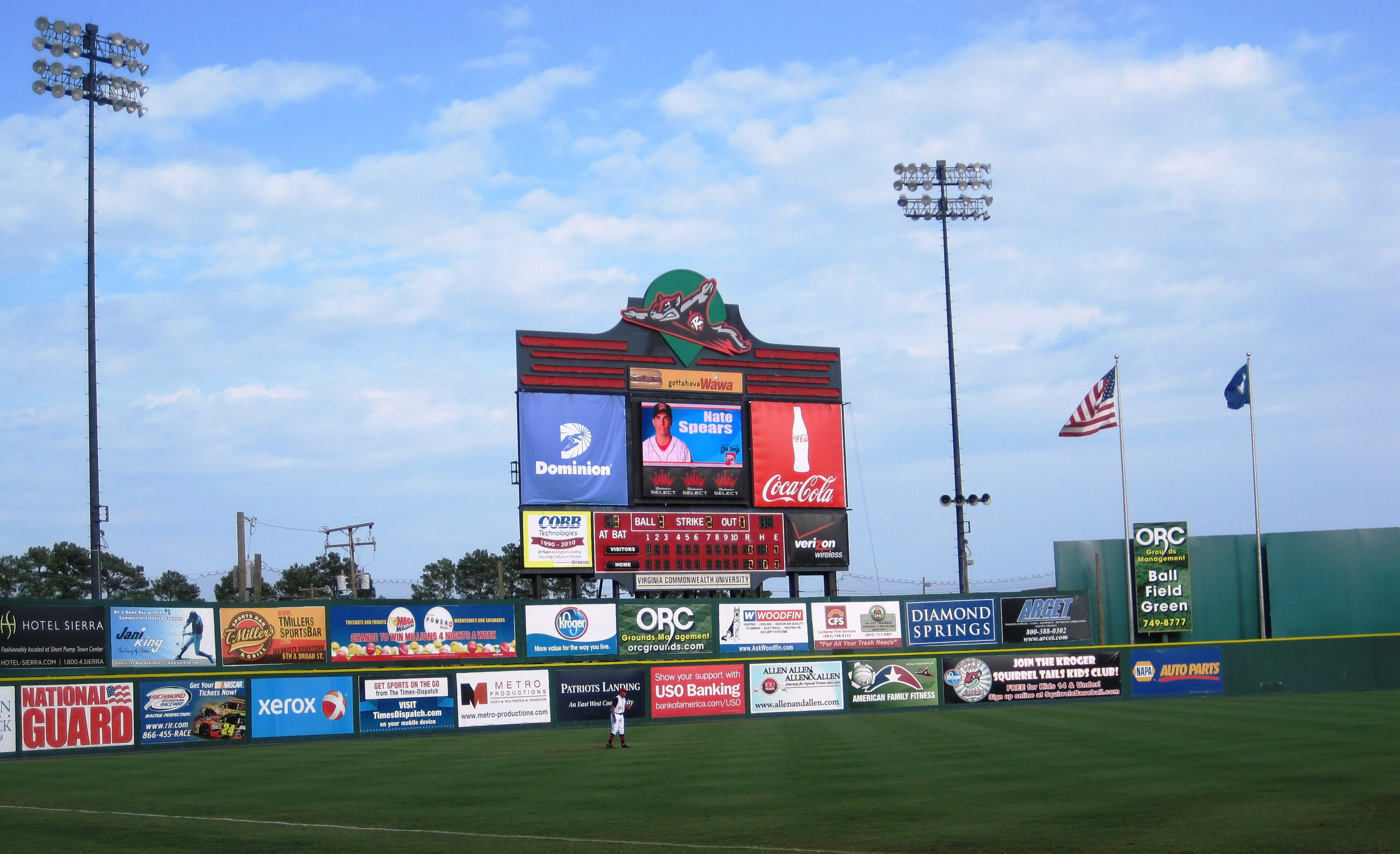
The Diamond was home to the Richmond Flying Squirrels of the Eastern League until the 2026 season.

Richmond has also come into the national spotlight in recent years due to the success of the region's two Division I college basketball teams, the VCU Rams and Richmond Spiders. The VCU Rams men's basketball team reached the Final Four of the 2011 NCAA Men's Division I Basketball Tournament, while the Richmond Spiders men's basketball team reached the Sweet 16 of the same tournament.

As of 2016, Richmond is also home to its first women's sports team, the Richmond Black Widows. They are in the Women's Football Alliance and play at Hovey Field. The expansion team plays in Tier III of the Women's Football Alliance and is the National Conference Champion.

The Washington Commanders hold training camp in Richmond every year.

== Professional teams ==
Club	League	Sport	Venue (capacity)	Established
Richmond Flying Squirrels	Eastern League	Baseball	CarMax Park (10,000)	2010
Richmond Kickers	USL League One	Soccer	City Stadium (22,600)	1993

== College sports ==
School	Conference	NCAA Division	Venues
Richmond Spiders	Atlantic 10 Conference (most sports), CAA Football (football) (Patriot League, football only, in 2025)	Division I	Robins Stadium (football), Robins Center (basketball), Malcolm U. Pitt Field (baseball)
VCU Rams	Atlantic 10 Conference	Division I	Siegel Center (basketball), The Diamond (baseball), Sports Backers Stadium (soccer)
Virginia Union Panthers	Central Intercollegiate Athletic Association	Division II	Hovey Field (football)

== Participation sports ==
Richmond has played host to the Xterra (off-road triathlon) East Championship since 1998 on the trails of the James River Park, and will host the 2015 UCI Road World Championships.

Sports Backers is a non-profit organization founded in 1991 and located in Richmond, Virginia at Sports Backers Stadium. The mission of the Sports Backers has expanded from its beginnings as a traditional sports commission for economic development to be focused on increasing physical activity to improve the health of area residents. The Sports Backers own Dominion Riverrock, the largest outdoor sports and music festival in the country, the Ukrop's Monument Avenue 10k, the 8th largest running race in the United States, and the Anthem Richmond Marathon, the 18th largest marathon in the country. The organization owns and produces 15 events.

== Former teams ==
Richmond has hosted several minor pro hockey teams since the 1970s. The American Hockey League Richmond Robins played at the Richmond Coliseum from 1971 to 1976. The short-lived Eastern Hockey League's Richmond affiliate was the Richmond Rifles. The longest-lived and most successful of Richmond's hockey teams were the Richmond Renegades of the East Coast Hockey League, who played at the Coliseum from 1990 to 2003. After a brief stay by the Richmond RiverDogs of the United Hockey League from 2003 to 2006, former Renegades owner Allen Harvie attempted to revive the team again as a Southern Professional Hockey League franchise from 2006 to 2009. After the SPHL club left, hockey has been represented in Richmond by the junior and youth United States Premier Hockey League organization Richmond Generals at SkateNation Plus in Henrico County.

The Richmond Raiders, an indoor football team, played out of the Richmond Coliseum from 2010 until 2015 when it suspended operations. In 2016, the Raiders' ownership announced they would not return. The Richmond Revolution of the Indoor Football League played at the Arthur Ashe Athletic Center in 2010 and 2011. The Revolution had been planning to SportsQuest before they disbanded. The Richmond Roughriders played out of the Richmond Coliseum in 2017 and 2018, hosted the league championship games both years, but did not re-sign their lease when the Coliseum proposed a complete renovation for 2019.

There has been minor league baseball at the corner of the Boulevard and Robin Hood Road since 1954. In 1954, the International League Baltimore Orioles moved to Richmond as the Richmond Virginians, playing at Parker Field. The Virginians were part of the New York Yankees' organization for most of their time in Richmond. After the 1964 season, the team moved to Toledo, Ohio, as the Toledo Mud Hens. After a year off, the city was the beneficiary of the Milwaukee Braves' move to Atlanta, as the Braves' International League franchise, the Atlanta Crackers, moved to Richmond for the 1966 season as the Richmond Braves. The Braves played at Parker Field through 1984, after which the old ballpark was torn down and replaced with the concrete-and-steel "temporary" facility, The Diamond. The Braves left Richmond after the 2008 season to return to the Atlanta area as the Gwinnett Braves.

== See also ==
- List of professional sports teams in Virginia
