= N&W Class J =

N&W Class J may refer to:

- N&W J class (1879), a Class of Norfolk and Western Railroad 4-4-0 steam locomotives first manufactured in 1879
- N&W Class J (1903), a Class of Norfolk and Western Railroad 4-4-2 steam locomotives first manufactured in 1903
- N&W J class (1941), a Class of Norfolk and Western Railroad 4-8-4 steam locomotives first manufactured in 1941
