= CSEE =

CSEE is an initialism that may stand for:

- Canadian Society for Electrical Engineering, a predecessor of the Canadian Society of Electrical and Computer Engineering and IEEE Canada
- Certificate of Secondary Education Examination (Tanzania)
- Certificate of Secondary Education Examination in the United Kingdom
- Certified Sport Event Executive, an accreditation offered by the National Association of Sports Commissions
- Chinese Society for Electrical Engineering
- Civil, structural and environmental engineering
- Compagnie de Signaux et d'Entreprises Electriques, a division of MERMEC
- Computer Science and Electrical Engineering
