= Norfolk and Western M Class =

Class of American steam locomotives

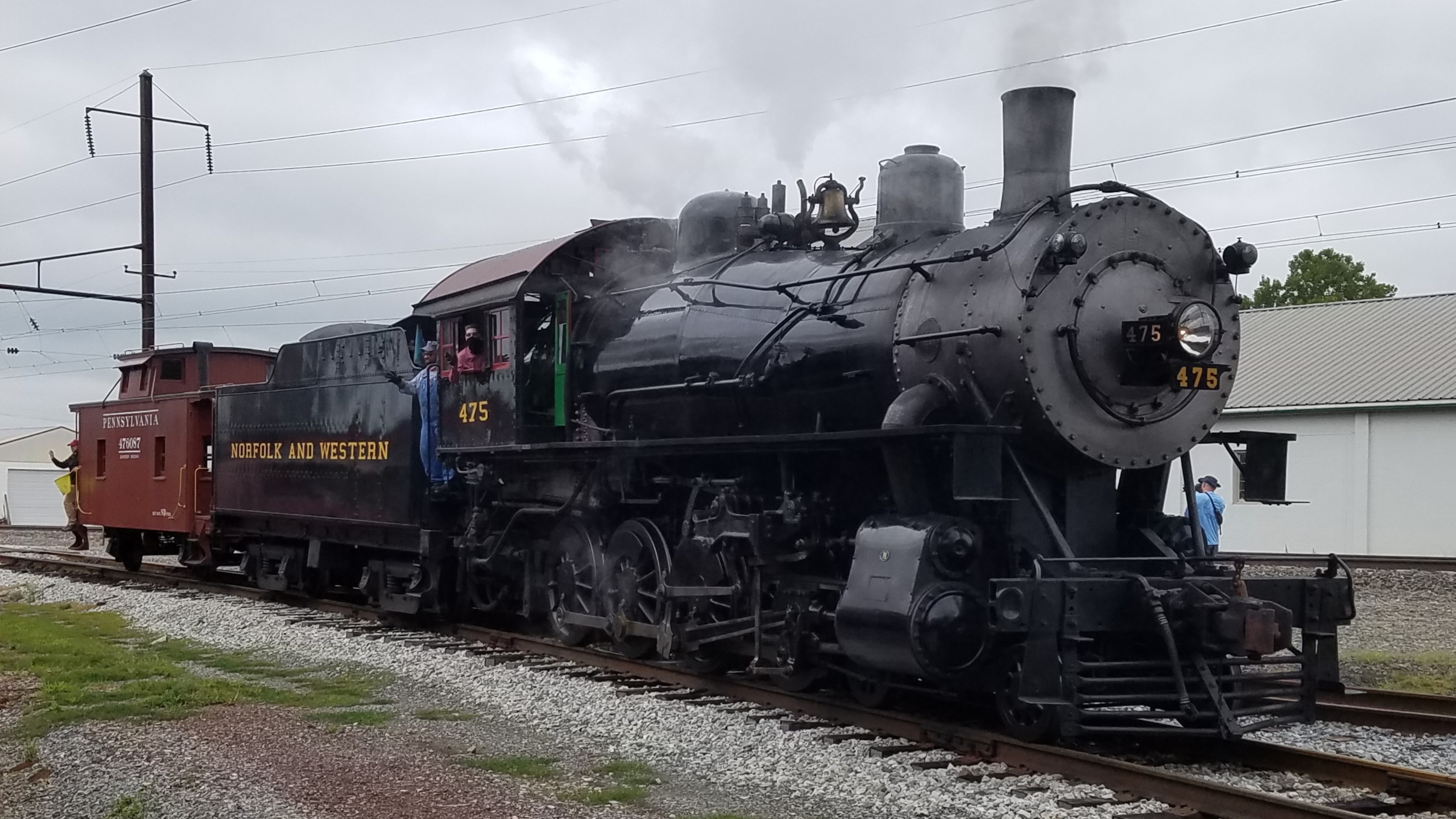
- N&W M Class No. 475 on the Strasburg Rail Road
Type and origin
- Power type: Steam
- Builder: Baldwin Locomotive Works (50); ALCO-Richmond (75)
- Build date: 1906–1907
- Total produced: 125
Specifications
- Configuration
  - Whyte: 4-8-0
  - UIC: 2'D
- Gauge: 4 ft 8 1/2 in (1,435 mm)
- Leading dia.: 27 in (686 mm)
- Driver dia.: 56 in (1,422 mm)
- Length: 74 ft 11 3/4 in (22.85 m)
- Height: 15 ft 5 in (4.70 m)
- Adhesive weight: 168,000 lb (76 tonnes)
- Loco weight: 200,000 lb (90.7 tonnes)
- Fuel type: Coal
- Fuel capacity: 40,000 lb (18.1 tonnes)
- Water cap.: 12,000 US gal (45,000 L; 10,000 imp gal)
- Boiler pressure: 200 psi (1,400 kPa)
- Heating surface: 2,940 sq ft (273.1 m^{2})
- Cylinders: Two, outside
- Cylinder size: 21 in × 30 in (533 mm × 762 mm)
- Valve gear: Stephenson (inside); Some later converted to Baker
- Valve type: 12-inch (300 mm) piston valves
Performance figures
- Tractive effort: 40,163 lbf (178.65 kN)
Career
- Operators: Norfolk and Western Railway
- Class: M
- Numbers: 375–499
- Nicknames: Mollies
- Retired: 1926–1959
- Preserved: 2 (Nos. 475 and 433) preserved, remainder scrapped
- Disposition: No. 475 operational on the Strasburg Rail Road and No. 433 on display

Norfolk and Western M1 Class
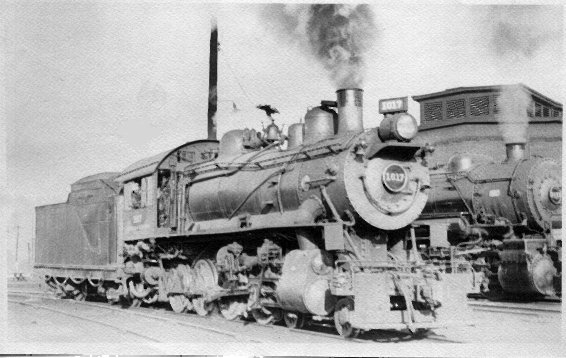
Type and origin
- Only differences from class M above are shown
- Power type: Steam
- Builder: Baldwin (50), ALCO-Richmond (50)
- Build date: 1907
- Total produced: 100
Specifications
- Valve gear: Walschaerts
Career
- Operators: Norfolk and Western Railway
- Class: M1
- Numbers: 1000–1099
- Nicknames: Mollies
- Retired: 1956, 1957
- Disposition: All scrapped

Norfolk and Western M2 Class
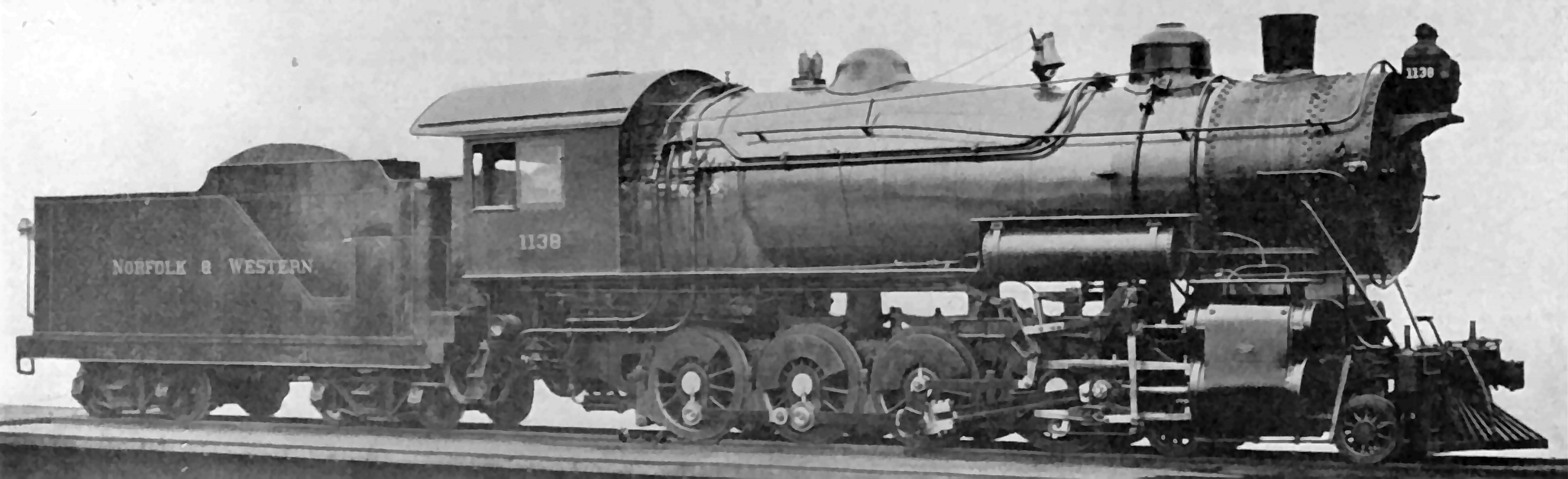
- N&W No. 1138 shortly after it was constructed by the Baldwin Locomotive Works
Type and origin
- Power type: Steam
- Builder: Baldwin (50); N&W Roanoke Shops (11)
- Serial number: Roanoke 182–192
- Build date: 1910
- Total produced: 61
Specifications
- Configuration
  - Whyte: 4-8-0
- Gauge: 4 ft 8 1/2 in (1,435 mm)
- Driver dia.: 56 in (1.422 m)
- Boiler pressure: 200 psi (1.38 MPa)
- Heating surface: 4,041 ft^{2} (375.4 m^{2}) (4,315 ft^{2} (400.9 m^{2}) with superheater)
- Cylinders: Two, outside
- Cylinder size: 24 in × 30 in (610 mm × 760 mm)
- Valve gear: Walschaerts (Baldwin built); Baker (Roanoke built)
Performance figures
- Tractive effort: 52,457 lbf (233.34 kN)
Career
- Operators: Norfolk and Western Railway
- Class: M2
- Numbers: 1100–1160
- Nicknames: Mollies
- Retired: 1950–1957
- Preserved: 2 (Nos. 1118 and 1134) preserved (+ an M2c, No. 1151), remainder scrapped

The Norfolk and Western M, M1 and M2 Classes were a series of 4-8-0 steam locomotives owned and operated by the Norfolk and Western Railway (N&W). The M Classes were primarily assigned to pull the N&W's mainline freight trains, but following the introduction of the railway's Y Class 2-8-8-2's, the M Classes were reassigned to short line freight service. They were given the nickname Mollies.

== Overview ==
=== Development ===
By the mid-1900s, the Norfolk and Western Railway (N&W) primarily relied on 2-8-0 "Consolidation" type locomotives to pull the company's heavy freight trains. As freight traffic increased, the N&W decided to place orders for larger locomotives with longer boilers. While 2-8-2 "Mikado" locomotives were made available in the railroad industry by that time, the N&W opted to order locomotives with the 4-8-0 wheel arrangement over the 2-8-2, since they felt putting the weight of the firebox over the rear driving wheels, as opposed to the trailing wheels, would increase adhesion.

=== Design and construction ===
The 4-8-0 design the N&W created, classified as the M class, was destined to be an upgrade to the Railway's W2 class 2-8-0's. The pilot axle would carry the lightweight smokebox, and the rear driving wheels would carry the heavyweight 45-square-foot (4 m^{2}) firebox. The firebox would be extended to the back wall of the cab, leaving no room for decks to be installed—this design was similar to those on camelback locomotives, but the fireboxes on the M class were conventional, and the cabs were placed over them, as opposed to ahead of them, like on the camelbacks. The engineer and fireman would have to sit in separate sides adjacent to the firebox while operating an M class, and the fireman would often have to stand on the tender deck while shoveling coal.

The M class locomotives were also equipped with 56-inch (1,422 mm) diameter driving wheels, 21-by-30-inch (533 mm × 762 mm) cylinders, and a boiler pressure of 200 pounds per square inch (1,379 kPa), and the locomotives would be capable of producing 40,163 pounds-force (179 kN) of tractive effort. 75 of the first M class locomotives (Nos. 375-449) were delivered from the American Locomotive Company's (ALCO) Richmond, Virginia works from June 1906 to February 1907, and 50 (Nos. 450-499) were delivered from the Baldwin Locomotive Works of Philadelphia, Pennsylvania from April to August 1906.

=== Service ===
The M class would prove to be a mainstay of N&W motive power, working in mainline, transfer, switching, and branch line service. Many members of the class would undergo modifications over the years, such as the addition of higher-capacity tenders, installation of power reverse gear, superheating, and the replacement of the original Stephenson valve gear with that of the Baker type. Popular in service, crews would come to affectionately nickname the locomotives Mollies, a moniker which stuck until their retirement in the late 1950s.

Following the initial success of the class Ms, the N&W would order more 4-8-0s of nearly identical design in the form of the M1s in 1907. These differed in their use of Walschaerts valve gear and piston valves in place of slide valves. This design change, however, severely affected the locomotives’ performance, largely due to a poorly-executed design. The valves’ centerlines, being offset from those of the pistons, resulted in excess running gear wear and improper valve timing. Unsurprisingly, as older motive power on the N&W would be phased out, the M1s were among the first to go.

Design shortcomings would plague the subsequent class of 4-8-0s, the M2s, as well. From their arrival in 1910, issues with poor riding qualities and steaming were apparent. Though utilizing a larger boiler than either the Ms or M1s, the M2s possessed a relatively small heating surface area in the firebox, resulting in considerable difficulty in maintaining steam. In spite of the issues (along with subsequent unsuccessful modifications), the M2s lasted in service for considerably longer than the M1s, being among the few larger examples of non-articulated freight power owned by the N&W. The last examples lasted in service until the late 1950s.

== Experiments ==
When larger locomotives arrived on the N&W, some of the M's were sent to work in switching and transfer service. After World War II, however, the N&W began exploring potential replacements, as many of the M’s had begun to show their age; the locomotives also failed to meet smoke abatement laws in many of the cities along the N&W network. In an experiment to address both issues, M2s Nos. 1100 and 1112 were extensively modified between 1947 and 1948, with No. 1100 being modified first. The boilers of both locomotives were rebuilt with shorter flues and combustion chambers. Induced draft fans, driven by steam turbines, were installed, along with mechanical stokers and water level controls; these were added so the locomotives could be left alone for long periods of time and gave rise to the nickname "Automatic Switcher”. Both locomotives were also fitted out with mechanical lubrication and modified tenders, providing an increase in water and coal capacity.

Though extensive, the experiment ultimately proved to be a short-lived failure. Several issues became apparent shortly after No. 1100 reentered service. The blades of the induced-draft fan were quickly eroded by cinders from the locomotive’s fire, and the relatively soft exhaust from the locomotive lead to smoke and ash becoming a frequent source of discomfort for crews. In spite of changes to the design with No. 1112, including increases in heating surface and boiler pressure, along with the installation of a cinder collector to return cinders to the firebox ahead of the induced-draft fan, both locomotives were retired in 1951. The issues encountered in the experiment and the advent of more modern motive power in the form of 0-8-0 switchers (both acquired secondhand from the Chesapeake and Ohio Railway and built in the N&W’s own Roanoke Shops) did little to prolong the service lives of the already subpar M2’s.

== Preservation ==
Two of the N&W's M Class locomotives have been preserved. One M Class, No. 433, is on static display while No. 475 is operational in tourist excursion service.

N&W 433 is currently on static display at the trail head of the Virginia Creeper Trail in Abingdon, Virginia.

N&W 475 was restored to operating condition by the Strasburg Rail Road (SRC) in Pennsylvania and it is being used to pull excursion trains on SRC’s tourist line.

Three of the N&W's M2s have been preserved. Nos. 1118 and 1151 have yet to be restored from scrapyard condition.

- No. 1134 has been cosmetically restored and is on display at the Railroad Museum of Virginia in Portsmouth, Virginia.
- No. 1118 is currently under the ownership of the National Railway Historical Society’s Roanoke Chapter.
- No. 1151 is part of the Virginia Museum of Transportation’s collection in Roanoke.

== See also ==
- Norfolk and Western Class A
- Norfolk and Western J Class (1879)
- Norfolk and Western J Class (1903)

== Bibliography ==
- Carling, D. Rock (1972). 4-8-0 Tender Locomotives. Drake Publishers Inc. ISBN 087749-150-X.
- Rosenberg, Ron; Archer, Eric H. (1973). Norfolk & Western Steam (The Last 25 Years). New York, NY: Quadrant Press, Inc. pp. 11–16, 77–78. ISBN 0-915276-00-3.
- Dressler, Thomas (August 1995). "Norfolk & Western's remarkable 4-8-0s". Railfan & Railroad. Carstens Publications. Archived from the original on 1998-05-08.
