= Fall Line Trail =

Multi-use trail in Virginia, United States

The Fall Line (Under Development)
- Length: 43 mi (69 km)
- Location: Central Virginia
- Trailheads: Ashland, Virginia; Bryan Park, Richmond; Petersburg, Virginia
- Use: Multi-use, Walking, cycling

The trail's proposed route in Hanover County, Virginia

The Fall Line is an approximately 43.6 mile paved multi-use trail currently under development — from a northern terminus in Ashland, Virginia to a southern terminus in Petersburg, Virginia — aligning with the East Coast Greenway, a proposed 3,000 mile pedestrian and bicycle route between Maine and Florida.

Early in its development, the Fall Line had been identified as the Ashland to Petersburg Trail (ATP), and was formally renamed when the state of Virginia broke ground on the trail in October, 2020. Anticipated to serve as a recreational and commuter spine for Central Virginia, the trail has no formal scheduled completion date, as of mid-2021.

Running roughly north-south, the trail is projected to cross Chesterfield, Hanover and Henrico counties, the cities of Colonial Heights, Petersburg and Richmond, and the Town of Ashland — and will cross the Chickahominy, the James and Appomattox Rivers.

Sports Backers, a Richmond-based tax-exempt active-living advocacy group formed in 1991 — and chief proponent of the trail — estimates that 350,000 people live within two miles of the proposed route. The organization leads a series of guided hikes along proposed sections of the Fall Line, each October.

The trail's name refers to its location along the Atlantic Seaboard's geological Fall Line, the 900 mi (1,400 km)-long escarpment where the Piedmont and Atlantic Coastal Plain meet.

== Conception ==
The Fall Line was conceived in 2017 by Sports Backers, realizing that numerous existing and proposed north-south trails could be connected into a single regional trail. Sports Backers itself had been founded in 1991 to support bike and pedestrian friendly policies, programs and infrastructure projects. The organization works with officials, municipal staff, other advocates, and volunteers — to advance the project. The trail has developed as a collaborative effort in cooperation with the Virginia Department of Transportation (VDOT), the seven localities, the Crater Planning District Commission, and PlanRVA. In February 2020, VDOT published its study report, identifying stakeholders, case studies of multi-use trails, six possible alignments as well as the preferred corridor for the proposed trail.

== Connectivity and design ==
Depending on the final corridor, the Fall Line is projected to connect 24 public schools, four colleges and universities, two community colleges as well as the 3.2 mile Appomattox River Trail near Petersburg. In the city of Richmond, the trail is projected to directly cross the Richmond Canal Walk and the 52 mile, roughly east-west, Williamsburg-to-Richmond Virginia Capital Trail (VCT). In other localities it will connect existing and planned infrastructure, including the Ashland Trolley Line Trail, Chester Linear Park, Trolley Line Connector (Henrico), Brook Road protected bike lanes (Richmond), and the Northern Jefferson Davis Special Area Plan (Chesterfield). At the James River, the trail may cross at the T. Tyler Potterfield Memorial Bridge, a former dam that reopened in 2016 as a predominantly pedestrian bridge.

In contrast to the Virginia Capital Trail, which primarily crosses rural areas, The Fall Line's route is projected to cross urban, suburban, and rural areas. Like the Capital Trail, extensive wayfinding and signage will identify the trail, which is projected to include a separation from vehicular lanes.

As a planning element for the City of Richmond, the trail is projected to serve recreational purposes; augment a planned north-south city bus route; and provide a safe, easy pedestrian route connecting community functions and amenities, especially in areas currently lacking sidewalk infrastructure. In this way, the trail will augment city goals to develop complete streets, a planning concept prioritizing comprehensive street design regardless of transportation mode.

== Development ==
The idea of the Fall Line was conceived in 2017 when it was realized by Sports Backers that many existing and proposed trails could be connected into a regional spine trail. Sports Backers was founded in 1991 to support bike and pedestrian friendly policies, programs and infrastructure projects. The organization works with officials, municipal staff, other advocates, and volunteers — to advance the project. The trail has developed as a collaborative effort in cooperation with the Virginia Department of Transportation (VDOT), the seven localities, the Crater Planning District Commission, and PlanRVA. In February 2020, VDOT published its study report, identifying stakeholders, case studies of multi-use trails, six possible alignments as well as the preferred corridor for the proposed trail.

As of early 2021, the trail had received approximately $5.7 million in state funding, with a projected cost in the range of $106-192 million (reported variously). and funding coming from transportation funds, local jurisdictions, regional funding and form the Central Virginia Transportation Authority. The trail is projected to cost approximately three times the cost of the Virginia Capital Trail.

In mid-2024, the City of Richmond broke ground on the city's portion of the trail, a thirteen mile segment extending from Bryan Park, which will become a key trailhead, to the Chesterfield County border to the South. By this time, the Fall Line Trail's overall cost was projected at $300M.

The Fall Line had received $104 million in funding by late 2024, following Virginia's General Assembly 2020 creation of the Central Virginia Transportation Authority, allowing local governments in the Richmond area to raise money for transportation projects via sales and gas taxation.

In 2024, Sports Backers announced it would renovate a 5,905 square foot former branch bank at 4921 Lakeside Avenue, Richmond, to house their offices and a trailhead for the Fall Line Trail, with parking and restrooms. Near Richmond's historic Spring Park, site of Gabriel's Rebellion of 1800, the former Bank of America branch bank will accommodate office space, multi-purpose fitness and training room, community meeting room, along with a programmable outdoor space. Sharing direct access to the Fall Line, the center will host over an estimated 11,000 visitors annually for group fitness classes and youth coaching sessions, advocacy and community meetings.

== See also ==
- Cycling infrastructure
- Rail trail
- List of rail trails
- High Bridge Trail State Park
- New River Trail State Park
- Greenbrier River Trail
- Virginia Capital Trail
- Virginia Creeper Trail
- Washington & Old Dominion Trail
