= Norfolk and Western 433 =

Preserved N&W class M 4-8-0 locomotive

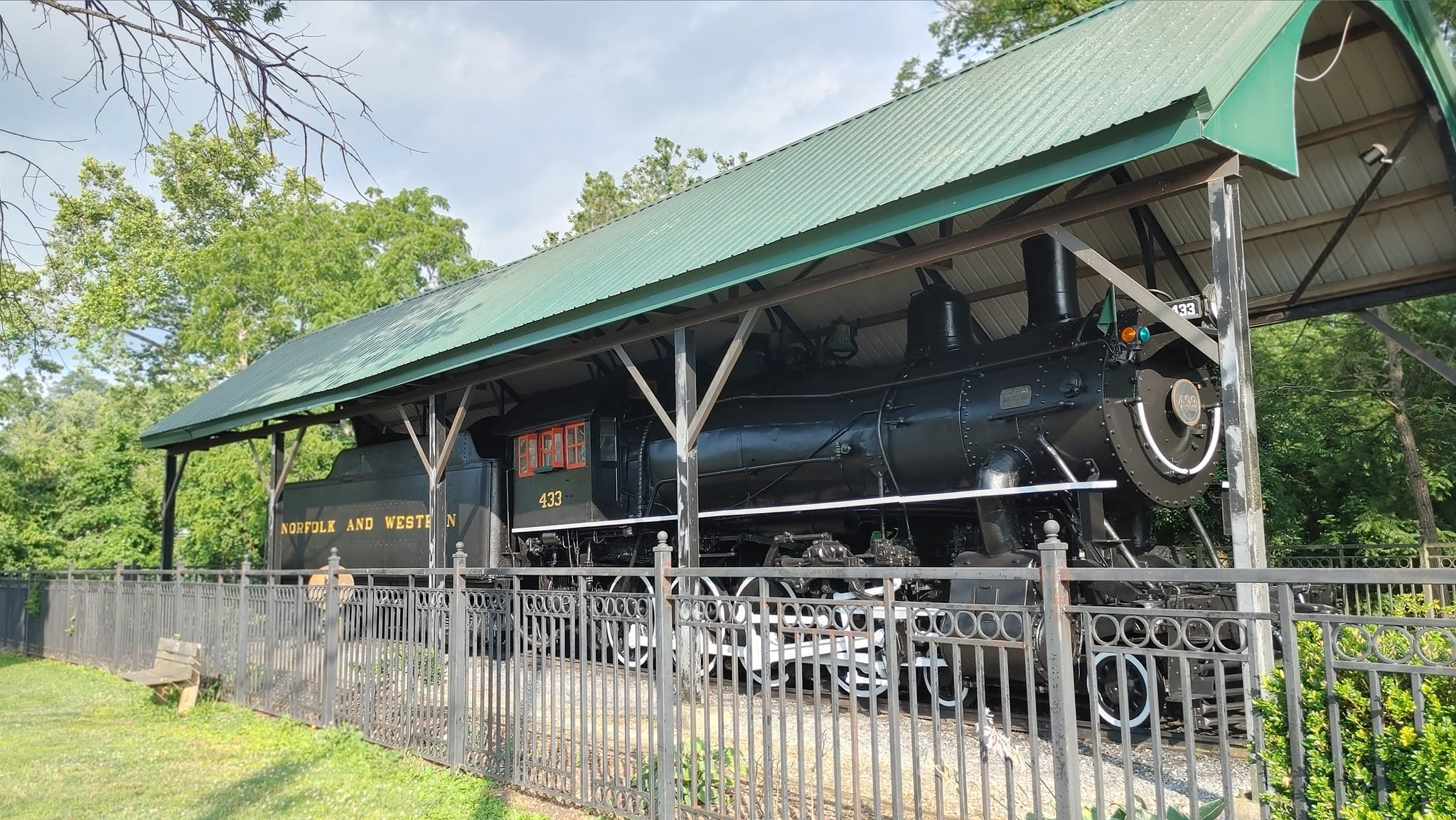
- Norfolk and Western No. 433 at the trail head of Virginia Creeper Trail, 2023
Type and origin
- Power type: Steam
- Builder: American Locomotive Company (Richmond Works)
- Serial number: 40329
- Build date: January 1907
Specifications
- Configuration
  - Whyte: 4-8-0
  - UIC: 2′D
- Gauge: 4 ft 8 1/2 in (1,435 mm)
- Leading dia.: 27 in (0.686 m)
- Driver dia.: 56 in (1.422 m)
- Wheelbase: 58.37 ft (17.79 m)
  - Engine: 26.42 ft (8.05 m)
  - Drivers: 15.50 ft (4.72 m)
- Adhesive weight: 169,800 lb (77,000 kg)
- Loco weight: 206,200 lb (93,500 kg)
- Tender weight: 167,500 lb (76,000 kg)
- Total weight: 373,700 lb (169,500 kg)
- Fuel type: Coal
- Fuel capacity: 22,000 lb (10.0 tonnes)
- Water cap.: 10,000 US gal (38,000 L; 8,300 imp gal)
- Firebox
  - Grate area: 45 sq ft (4.2 m^{2})
- Boiler pressure: 200 psi (1.38 MPa)
- Heating surface
  - Firebox: 173 sq ft (16.1 m^{2})
  - Total surface: 2,940 sq ft (273 m^{2})
- Cylinders: Two, outside
- Cylinder size: 21 in × 30 in (533 mm × 762 mm)
- Valve gear: Baker
- Valve type: Piston valves
- Loco brake: Air
- Train brakes: Air
- Couplers: Knuckle
Performance figures
- Tractive effort: 40,163 lbf (178.65 kN)
- Factor of adh.: 4.23
Career
- Operators: Norfolk and Western Railway
- Class: M
- Number in class: 58
- Numbers: N&W 433
- Nicknames: Mollie
- Retired: 1958
- Restored: 2002 (cosmetically)
- Current owner: Town of Abingdon, Virginia
- Disposition: On static display

Norfolk and Western 433 is a preserved M class 4-8-0 "Mastodon" type steam locomotive built by the American Locomotive Company's (ALCO) Richmond Locomotive Works in January 1907 for the Norfolk and Western Railway (N&W). It was one of 125 M class engines in operation on the N&W for around 50 years. After surviving an accident in 1951, the No. 433 was rebuilt and worked in Bristol, Virginia for a time where she was also assigned as a back up locomotive for the Abingdon Branch. This "Mollie" also worked as a switcher in Roanoke, Salem, and Radford. The No. 433 was eventually retired in 1958 and it became one of only two M Class locomotives to survive aside from the "Lost Engines of Roanoke". It was cosmetically restored in 2002 and now resides as a static display along the Virginia Creeper Trail in Abingdon.

== History ==
=== Original service ===
The Norfolk and Western Railway (N&W), mainly operating in Virginia and West Virginia, preferred 4-8-0 "Mastodon" types over 2-8-2 "Mikados" as their non-articulated freight locomotives. They were highly versatile locomotives and were often nicknamed "Mollies" by old railroaders. A total of 75 M class engines were built by the American Locomotive Company (ALCO) in Richmond, Virginia and 50 built by Baldwin Locomotive Works in Philadelphia, Pennsylvania between 1906 and 1907, numbered 375–499. In 1907, both companies built 50 more each being classed as M1s and numbered 1000–1099. Baldwin built 50 more in 1910, these classed M2s and numbered 1100–1160. 433 was among the last of the M class built in January 1907. In the early years of the N&W, 433 was used for mainline freight and passenger service, as well as local yard work. When larger and heavier locomotives such as the Y class mallets were introduced in the 1920s, the "Mollies" were all reassigned to branch lines.

No. 433 was assigned to was the Abingdon branch between Abingdon and West Jefferson, North Carolina, nicknamed the Virginia Creeper due to steep grades, sharp curves, and wooden trestles that prohibited heavier locomotives. In 1951, No. 433 was involved in a wreck and rebuilt afterwards. It was used for yard switching in Bristol due to a lack of superheating. On at least one occasion, No. 433 and two other Mastodons tripleheaded on the Virginia Creeper to pull heavy gravel trains South to North Carolina. Upon arrival at White Top station, the No. 433 ended her "helper duty" and returned to Bristol tender first, since there was no turntable, nor a wye to turn the locomotive around at White Top, or Abingdon. Steam operations ceased on the Virginia Creeper in 1957, with Mollies 382 and 429 being the last in service. No. 433 was withdrawn the following year after more than fifty years of revenue service.

=== Preservation ===
The Town of Abingdon wanted a steam locomotive for static display to commemorate the Virginia Creeper, so the N&W donated No. 433, which arrived at Radford before being moved to its present display site in November 1958. The locomotive stayed there for 63 years under a wooden roof for protection from the weather. However No. 433 was still exposed to the elements and vandals, resulting in significant deterioration and damage. By 1974, the N&W petitioned the Interstate Commerce Commission to abandon the branch, and by 1984 the track was ripped up and converted into a trail, being secured by the US Forest Service to create the Virginia Creeper Trail. In 2002, volunteers from the Virginia Creeper Trail Club, in partnership with the Washington County Preservation Foundation, began a project to cosmetically restore No. 433 to 1958 condition. Local businesses contributed material and labor to this effort, and volunteers constructed and painted windows and doors, as well as cleaning and painting the tender and interior of the cab. The old building that covered No. 433 was demolished and replaced by a steel one. Two marker lights were bought for the smokebox to replace those stolen more than twenty years prior.

== Surviving sister engines ==
- Norfolk and Western 475 is the only other preserved M class 4-8-0, being older than No. 433 despite the higher road number. It was sold and moved several times between 1960 and 1985 and has been operating on the Strasburg Rail Road in Strasburg, Pennsylvania since 1993.
- There are three younger N&W 4-8-0s known as the "Lost Engines of Roanoke", those being two M2 locomotives, Nos. 1118 and 1134 and M2c No. 1151, located in the Virginia Scrap Iron & Metal yard from 1950 to 2009. In 2009 Nos. 1151, 1134 and 1118 were recovered on August 21, August 24, and August 26 respectively. 1134 has received cosmetic restoration and is now located at the Railroad Museum of Virginia, in Portsmouth. 1118 was traded for 0-6-0T No. 34 and will remain at NRHS chapter's 9th Street facility. 1151 was moved to the Virginia Museum of Transportation in Roanoke.

== See also ==
- Norfolk and Western 578
- Southern Railway 107
- Southern Railway 385
- Florida East Coast 153
