= Mendota Trail =

Rail trail in Virginia, United States

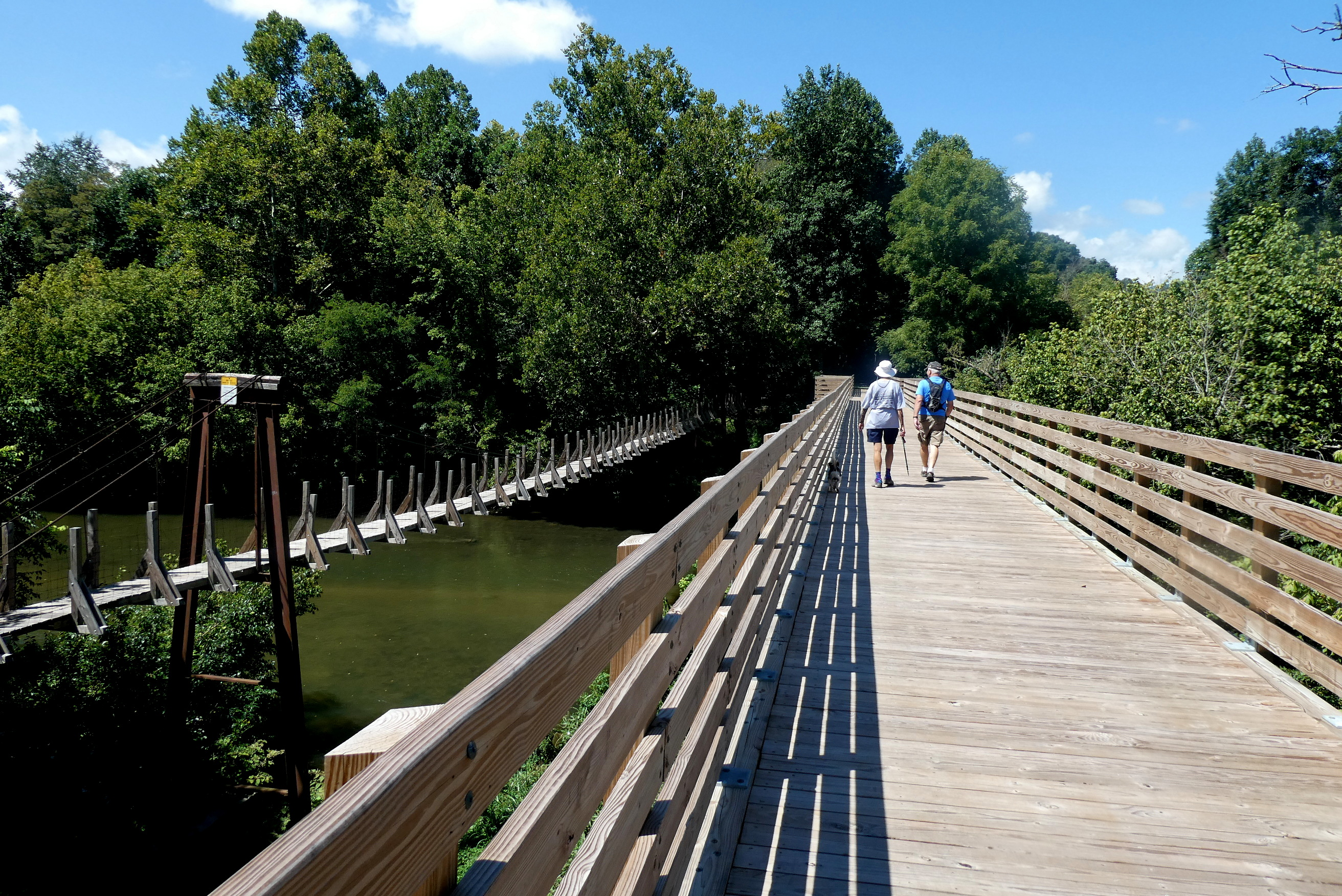
Sunnyside Trestle 19 Crossing the Holston River

The Mendota Trail is a 12.5 miles (20.1 km) multi-purpose rail trail in the United States. Located in southwestern Virginia, the trail runs from Bristol to Mendota, Virginia in Washington County.

Travelling from Bristol at about 1,700 feet (520 m) of elevation, the trail climbs about 400 feet (120 m) to its highest point, then drops 800 feet through The Cut and Wolf Run Gorge to Mendota. Along the way, the trail passes the old railroad stops at Walkers Mountain (later called Haskell Station), Benhams, Leonard, Phillips Switch, Abrams Falls, crosses the North Fork of the Holston River and ends at Mendota.

The trail features four access points: Bristol, Benhams, Little Wolf Run Road and Mendota trailheads. See Trail Map.

The trail accommodates hikers, runners and cyclists, crossing 17 restored trestles, various creeks including Abrams and Wolf Run, and the North Fork of the Holston River. Two additional trestles that originally existed along this railroad route were removed in the 1990s by Virginia Department of Transportation (VDOT) to facilitate road projects at the time. Starting at the Bristol trailhead, the first half mile is paved, and the remaining 12 miles consists of a fine gravel/ chat surface.

Future plans include extending the trail 3.5 miles from the Bristol trailhead at I-81 to Bristol's Cumberland Square Park and to create a 1.5 mile spur hiking trail from Phillips to Abrams Falls.

The trail is for recreational use, but it is also used to host numerous local events and races such as the Mendota Trail Cut to the Chase 5K & 1 Mile Run/Walk, Mendota 5K River Run & Mile, Kiss the Gravel Bike Ride, and the Yeti 50, Yeti 100.

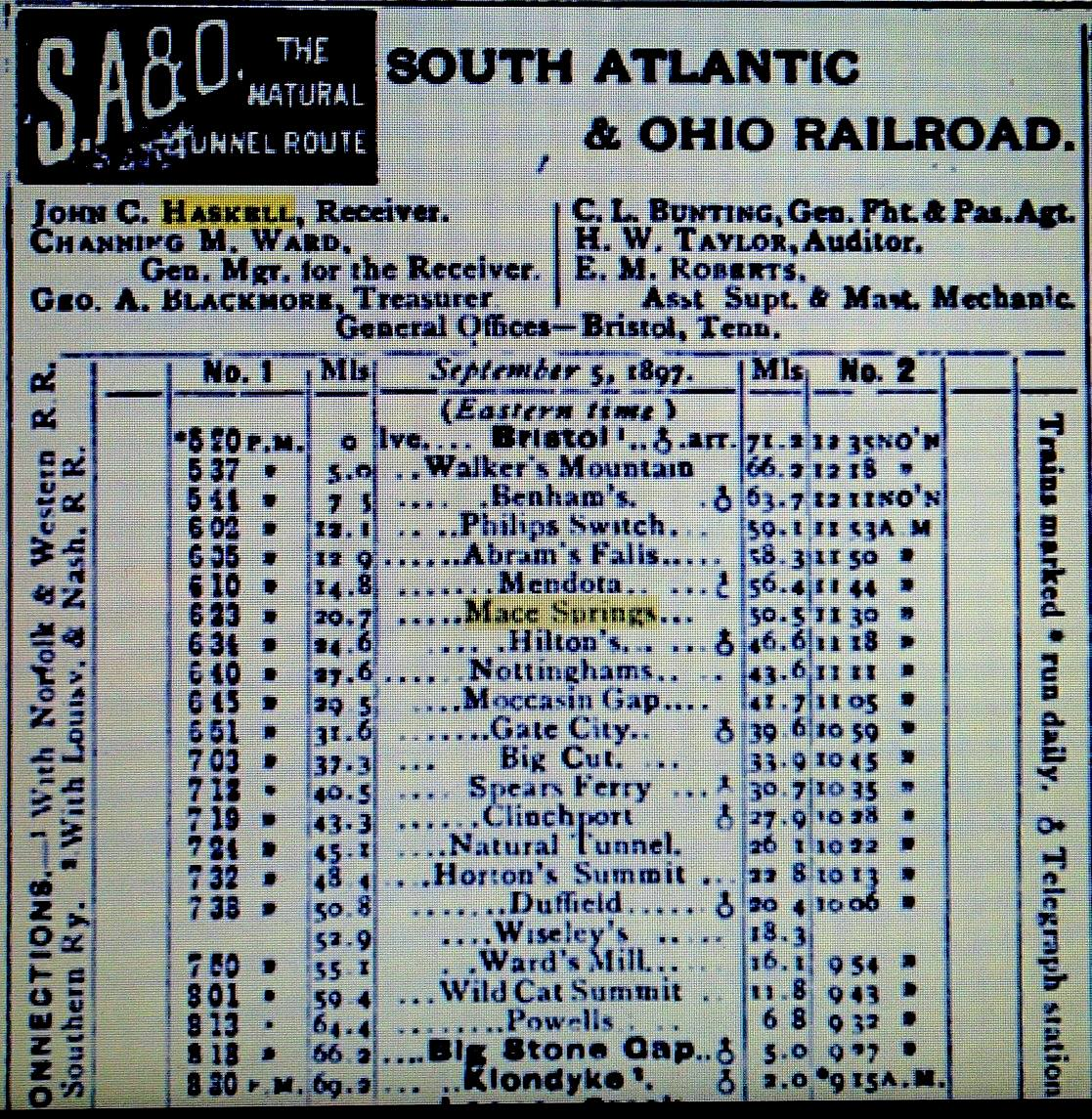
South Atlantic and Ohio Railway Time Table

== History ==
The trail runs on portion of a railroad right-of-way (ROW) that ran from Bristol to Mendota, Maces Springs, Weber City, through Natural Tunnel and on to Big Stone Gap. This railroad was first conceived in the mid-1850s, but construction was postponed by the Civil War until the 1870s, construction aided by convict labor from Richmond. First belonging to the Bristol Coal and Iron Narrow Gauge Railroad Co, the trestles were built to carry heavier loads than other railroads of the period. Passenger and freight service began in May 1890 and flourished on this line, now called the South Atlantic and Ohio Railway (1890) or the Virginia and Southwestern Railway (1899), until service as Southern Railway (U.S.) ceased in 1972 after 82 years.

The last passenger train ran in 1947. In 1951, the last steam engine was retired and replaced by diesel powered engines. In 1970, the last Southern trains ran on this branch. During its heyday years, the most famous steam train on this route, going all the way to Cincinnati, was the Lonesome Pine Special.

After flooding destroyed trestles in the 1970, the ROW was leased by Southwest Virginia Scenic Railway and passenger excursion trains ran in 1972-75 between Hiltons and Mendota and again in 1981 between Bristol and Benhams. Eventually, around 1987, the decision was made to create the Lonesome Pine Special Trail by The Lonesome Pine Recreation Corporation and tracks were removed. Some, early efforts to create a trail envisioned included not only the ROW between Bristol and Mendota, but also included the former railroad ROW as far as Mace Springs. Development progress was held up for many years, and eventually abandoned, due to lawsuits from a number of adjacent property owners claiming reversion of ROW title when the Southern Railroad ceased operation.

Around 2000, The City of Bristol, Virginia purchased much of the land consisting of 14 miles of former railroad right of way through Washington County with new plans to create what would now be known as the Mendota Trail. A Mendota Trail Development and Management Plan was created. Quite a few citizens donated money to get that trail off the ground, which the city spent buying the property. The Project was again held up for years by lawsuits and finally Bristol gave up on their Trail effort in 2008.

In 2015, trail proponents found an organization, Mountain Heritage, whose principal, Frank Kilgore, had a strong record of trail project completion. In May 2016, The City of Bristol, Virginia deeded this land Right of Way to the Mountain Heritage Inc. nonprofit with the stipulation that at least a mile of trail must be created, and the third effort began to make this trail became a reality. Although still contested by some adjacent property owners, in a 2007 court document dealing with a review of individual claims against the Mendota Trail project and the possibility of the land reverting to original owners, Circuit Judge C. Randall Lowe wrote "the court finds the deed states if the railroad is built, then the possibility of reversion is extinguished. The railroad was built. Therefore, the condition of reversion was satisfied and the railroad and its assigns owned a fee simple interest in the property conveyed." Thus, the railroad property Mountain Heritage owns in fee simple is no longer public property.

In October 2017 the first mile of Trail was opened between Mendota and the Holston River. In December 2018 property was purchased to become the Island Road Trailhead. In late 2020 trail ownership was transferred from Mountain Heritage to the Mendota Trail Conservancy Inc. (MTC).

Coinciding to the planned trails end-to-end completion in September 2023, the ownership of the Trail transferred to Washington County, Virginia, providing much needed resources for the longevity of the trail including funding for improvements, maintenance and insurance coverage, plus a full time maintenance staff position.

While the trail control by the MTC remains intact, the Mendota Trail is now considered a Washington County Park.

== See also ==
- Cycling infrastructure
- Rail trail
- List of rail trails
- Virginia Creeper Trail also in Washington County
