= Rappahannock-Rapidan Regional Commission =

The Rappahannock-Rapidan Regional Commission (RRRC), founded in 1973, is one of 21 Virginia Planning District Commissions. The Regional Commission is not a State Agency, but was established by its member governments through a charter agreement under Virginia law as a political subdivision of the Commonwealth. The Regional Commission serves the governments, businesses, and citizens of the region. The Commission is sometimes referred to as Planning District Nine, but its official name is the Rappahannock-Rapidan Regional Commission.

The Commission's board is composed of 21 representatives appointed by its member local governments.

The commission promotes regional cooperation and provides support to member localities in transportation planning, environmental planning, housing, land-use planning, comprehensive planning, GIS and economic development. As a State Data Center Affiliate, the commission also provides demographic data services.

Commission funding varies from year to year. Funding is obtained from multiple federal, state and local sources.

The commission also staffs several regional committees, including Foothills Housing Network, Food Policy Council, Land Use and Environment committee and Regional Tourism committee. The Commission also provides staffing for Commuter Services, which provides ridematching services and carpool and vanpool information to area commuters.

== Member governments ==
- Culpeper County, Virginia
- Fauquier County, Virginia
- Madison County, Virginia
- Orange County, Virginia
- Rappahannock County, Virginia
- Culpeper, Virginia
- Gordonsville, Virginia
- Madison, Virginia
- Orange, Virginia
- Remington, Virginia
- The Plains, Virginia
- Warrenton, Virginia
- Washington, Virginia
