= Greenbrier River Trail =

Long-distance hiking trail in the United States

Greenbrier River Rail Trail State Park
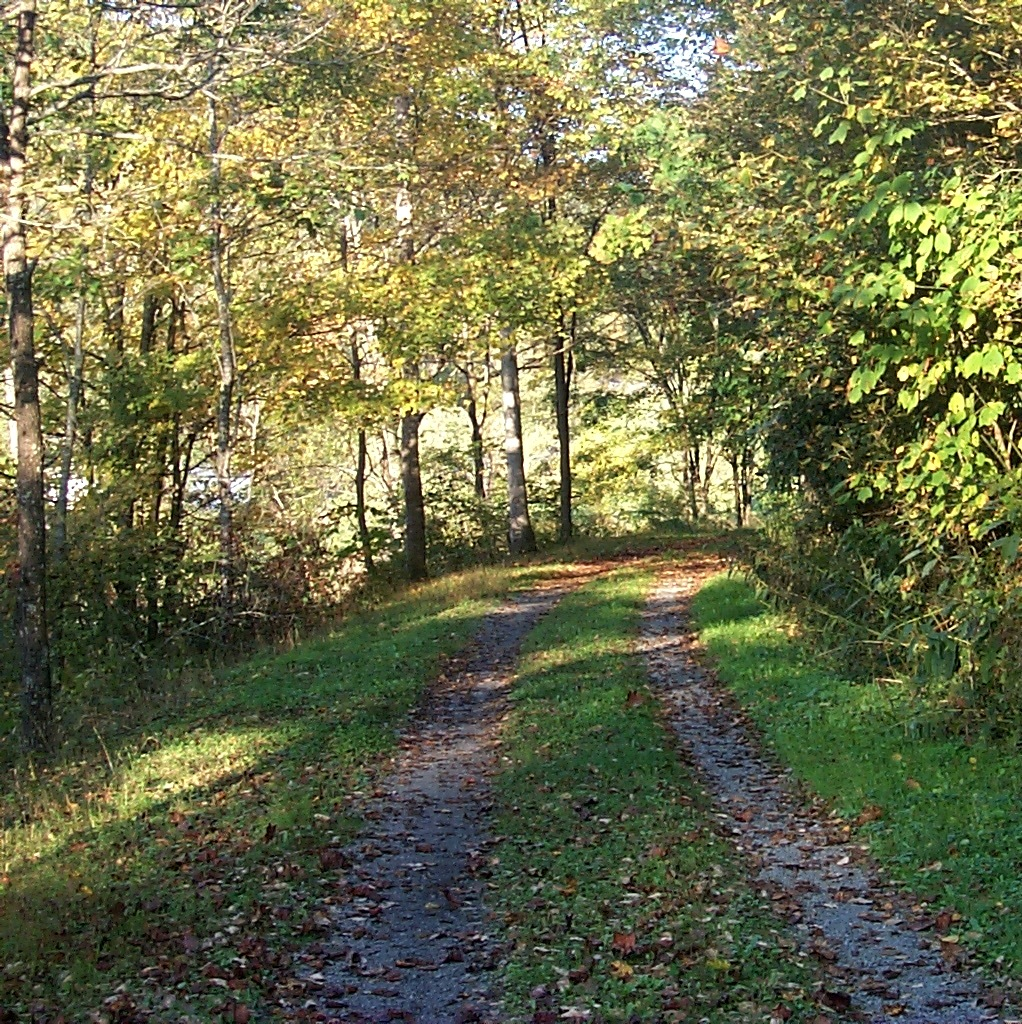
- Greenbrier River Trail south of Marlinton

- Location within West Virginia
- Location: Greenbrier County, West Virginia and Pocahontas County, West Virginia
- Nearest town: Marlinton, West Virginia
- Coordinates: 38°13′18″N 80°05′39″W
- Elevation: 2,116 ft (645 m)
- Established: 1980
- Named for: Greenbrier River
- Governing body: West Virginia Division of Natural Resources
- Website: wvstateparks.com/park/greenbrier-river-trail/

The Greenbrier River Trail (GRT), is a lineal state park comprising a 77.1-mile (124.1 km) rail trail between North Caldwell and Cass in eastern West Virginia, United States.

The GRT route and its contours were originally engineered by the Chesapeake and Ohio Railway, serving as a passenger and freight line before becoming unviable after the Great Depression. The right of way was gifted to the State of West Virginia in the late 1970s and the former railbed reopened in 1980 as a recreational multi-use trail.

The wheelchair-accessible trail features a hard-packed crushed-limestone surface accommodating hiking, bicycling, ski-touring and horseback-riding. Access is provided at 14 trailheads. The route features 16 primitive campsites (several with three-sided camping shelters), 50 to 60 picnic tables, and passes three state parks and two state forests. As it follows the Greenbrier River, the trail drops 732 feet (223 m) (north to south) along its route, crossing 35 trestles and traversing two tunnels – Droop Mountain Tunnel with a length of 409 feet (125 m) and Sharps Tunnel with a length of 500 feet (150 m).

In 1999, the GRT was one of 50 trails in the United States designated a Millennium Legacy Trail. In 2012, the trail was elected to the National Rail Trail Hall of Fame and was named by Backpacker magazine as "one of the Top 10 hiking trails in the United States."

== Background ==
The GRT follows portions of the Chesapeake and Ohio Railway's former Greenbrier Division constructed between North Caldwell and Cass in 1899 and 1900. The route was used heavily in the 1920s for through traffic via its connection with the Western Maryland Railway at Durbin, serving quarries, sawmills and tanneries as well as agricultural and livestock operations. The line hit its peak peacetime tonnage in 1926.

By the 1930s rail traffic waned, with the coming of improved roads and the depletion of timber tracts. Passenger service ended January 8, 1958, and freight service ended in December 1978, with the line being officially abandoned December 29, 1978.

The Chesapeake and Ohio donated most of its right-of-way south of Durbin, including the land that became the Greenbrier River Trail, to the State of West Virginia on June 20, 1980. A contractor for the railroad removed the track south of Cass in 1979–1980 and the state purchased the track from Cass to Durbin for its scrap value to be used by the Cass Scenic Railroad.

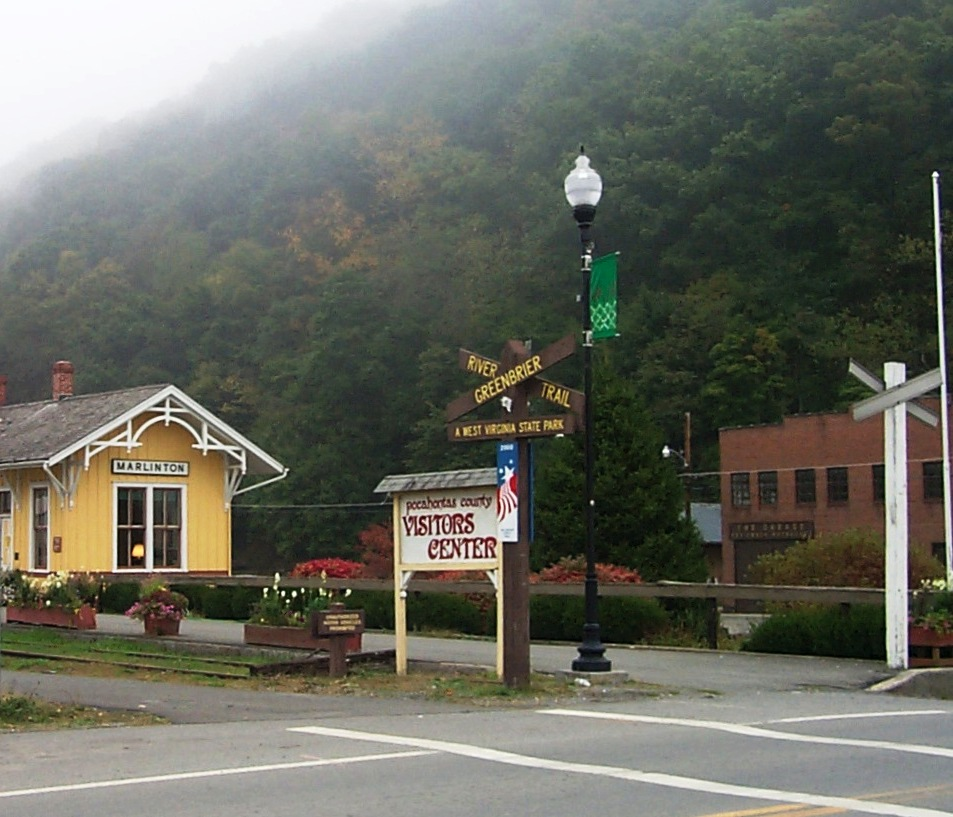
Marlinton trailhead

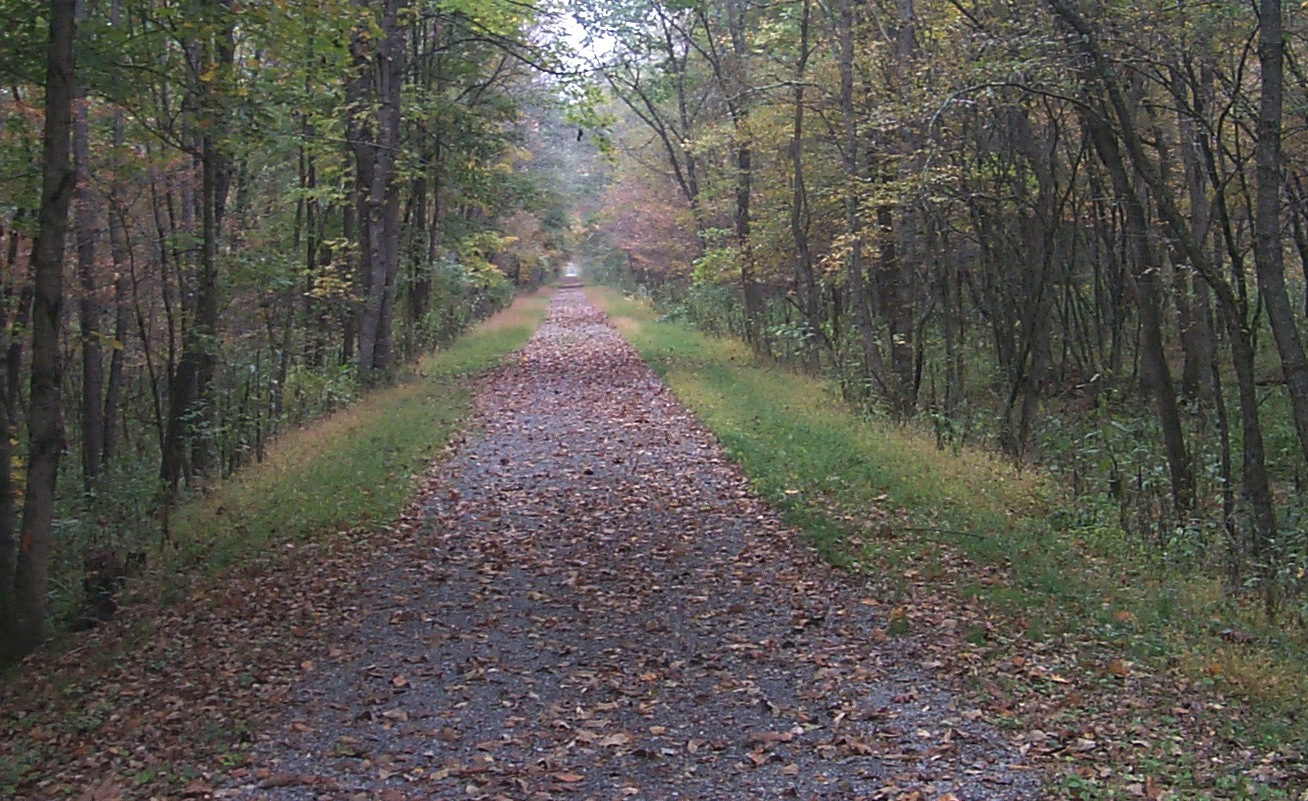
Straight shady section of trail

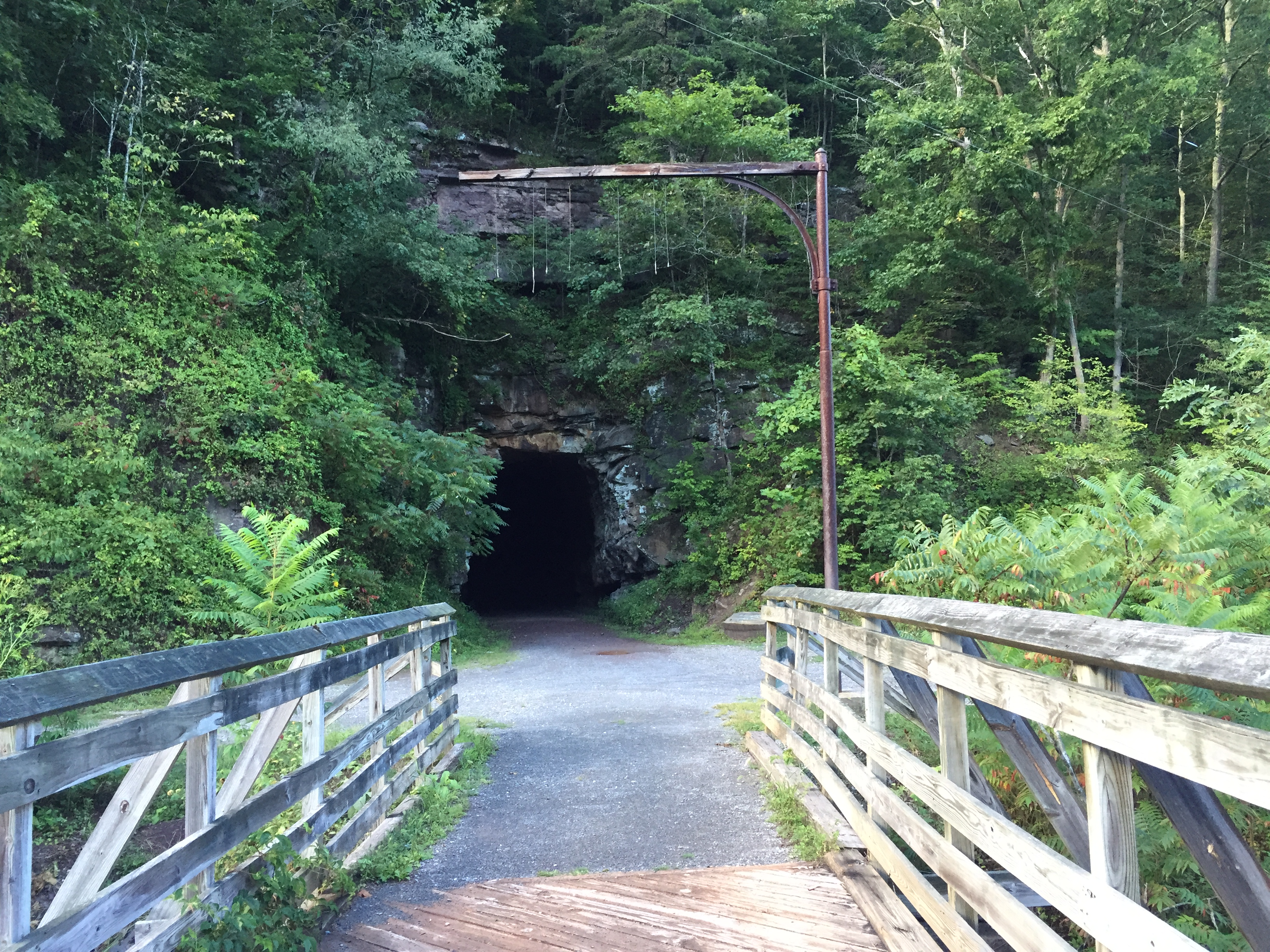
Southern entrance to Sharps Tunnel

== Trailheads ==
Greenbrier River Trail Trailheads with Parking
Trailhead	Milepost	Directions	Map Coordinates
North Caldwell	3.0	1.3 mi (2.1 km) N of US 60 on Stone House Road	37°47′37″N 80°22′50″W
Harper	5.8	On CR 30/3	
Keister	11.1	On CR 30/1	
Anthony	14.4	On CR 21/2	
Spring Creek	21.4	On CR 13, 3.5 mi (5.6 km) east of US 219	
Renick	24.5	On Auto Road (CR 11), 0.4 mi (0.64 km) east of US 219	
Horrock	29.6	On Rorer Road (CR 7/2)	
Beard	38.5	On Beard Post Office Road (CR 31/8)	
Burnsides	41.7	On Workman Road (CR 31/3)	
Seebert	45.8	at Seebert on Seebert Road (CR 27), about 2 miles (3.2 km) east of US 219	38°07′36″N 80°10′33″W
Marlinton	56.0	at Marlinton on WV 39	38°13′18″N 80°05′39″W
Cass	80.4	at Slabtown, 0.5 mi (0.80 km) S of Cass on WV 66 at Deer Creek Road	38°23′27″N 79°55′20″W

== See also ==
- Cycling infrastructure
- Greenbrier County
- Pocahontas County
- High Bridge Trail State Park
- New River Trail State Park
- Virginia Capital Trail
- Fall Line Trail
- Virginia Creeper Trail
- Washington & Old Dominion Trail
