= Virginia Creeper Trail =

Rail trail in Virginia, United States

Coordinates: 36°42′32.4″N 81°58′16.7″W

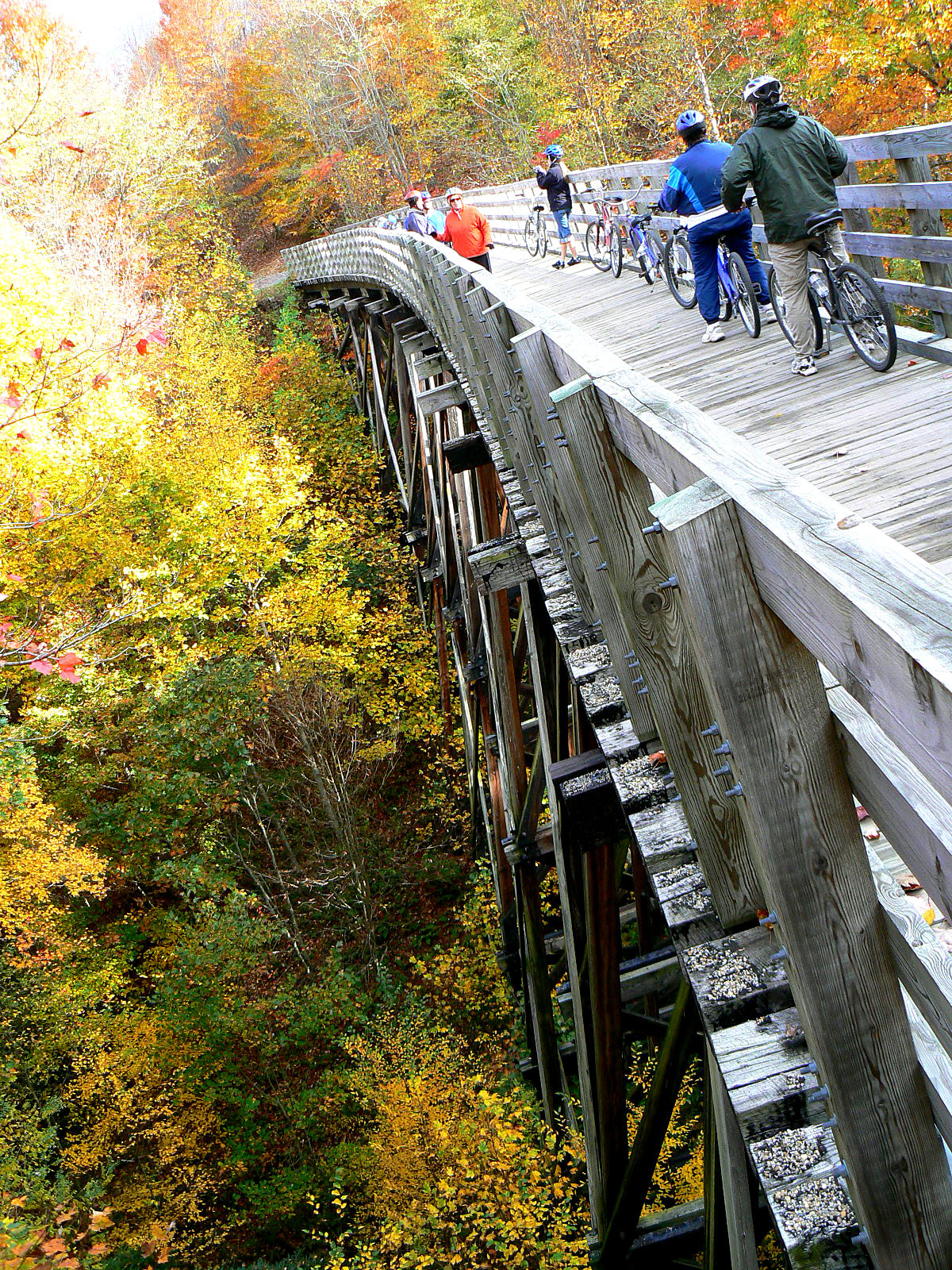
Riders stop at one of the high trestles on the Virginia Creeper Trail.

The Virginia Creeper Trail is a 35-mile (56 km) multi-purpose rail trail. Located in southwestern Virginia, the trail runs from Abingdon to Whitetop, Virginia, near Mount Rogers National Recreation Area and the North Carolina state line.

The trail accommodates hikers, cyclists and equestrians on its descent from Abingdon to Damascus, near the North Carolina state line – passing through National Forest, crossing a number of restored trestles and the Appalachian Trail.

Following Laurel Creek and traversing rolling farm countryside as well as a number of privately owned sections, the route necessitates cyclists open and close private gates. The trail features numerous intermediate access points, and between Abingdon and Watauga, five emergency call boxes can access emergency services.

Travelling from Abingdon, the trail goes through Watauga, Alvarado, Damascus, Straight Branch, Taylors Valley, Creek Junction, Green Cove and Whitetop. Elevation drops approximately 300 feet (90 m) from Abingdon to the South Holston River (near Damascus) and then climbs nearly 2,000 feet (610 m) to Whitetop. From Damascus, numerous private services are available to shuttle cyclist to Whitetop for the 17-mile (27 km) return descent.

The trail is for recreational use, but it is also used to host numerous local events and races such as the Run Damascus events, Down the Mountain Marathon, Iron Mountain Trail Races, Dam Yeti 50, Yeti 100, and Bridges & Trestles.

The Virginia Creeper Trail sustained severe damage from Hurricane Helene in September 2024 which led to its partial closure. Eighteen trestles have been destroyed, and seventeen miles of the trail were washed away by flooding. The federal government has allocated $660 million to the Forest Service for the trail's repair.

== History ==
The trail runs on a railroad right-of-way dating to the 1880s — first belonging to the Abingdon Coal and Iron Railroad. After investing sizable capital without actually opening, that company went out of business. In the early 1890s, the company's assets were purchased by the Virginia–Carolina and Southern Railway. It too had financial trouble and its assets were purchased by the Virginia–Carolina Railway.

In February 1900, the Virginia–Carolina Railway began operating in Damascus, Virginia. By 1912, the railroad extended to Whitetop and by the end of the decade to Elkland, North Carolina (now Todd). In 1919, the Norfolk & Western railroad, which had partially funded the building of the line, took control of it and dubbed it its Abingdon Branch. In 1933, service to Todd ended when the terminus moved to West Jefferson.

In 1957, the last steam engine retired, replaced by diesel-powered engines. By 1974, the Norfolk and Western Railroad Company petitioned the Interstate Commerce Commission to abandon the line. Finally, circumstances in 1977 induced the ICC to approve abandonment, as train service was forced to cease when hard rains flooded and damaged most of the line, which was left unrepaired.

Removal of the track began very soon after and the land in Virginia was secured by the US Forest Service for a recreation trail. The land in North Carolina was returned to the land owners. In Virginia, the right-of-way is owned by the Towns of Abingdon and Damascus, and by the National Park Service and the National Forest Service.

This branch line was a favorite of famed railroad photographer Ogle Winston Link. In contrast to his large number of night shots, using black and white film and synchronized flashbulb arrays, he photographed the Abingdon Branch during the day, in color. Many of his world-famous images are now housed in the former Norfolk and Western passenger station in Roanoke, Virginia, now the O. Winston Link Museum.

An original 4-8-0 steam locomotive No. 433 is located directly next to the trailhead at Abingdon, and the trail itself passes several restored stations. Two railroad cabooses are also located along the trail; one at the midpoint in Damascus and another at Taylors Valley.

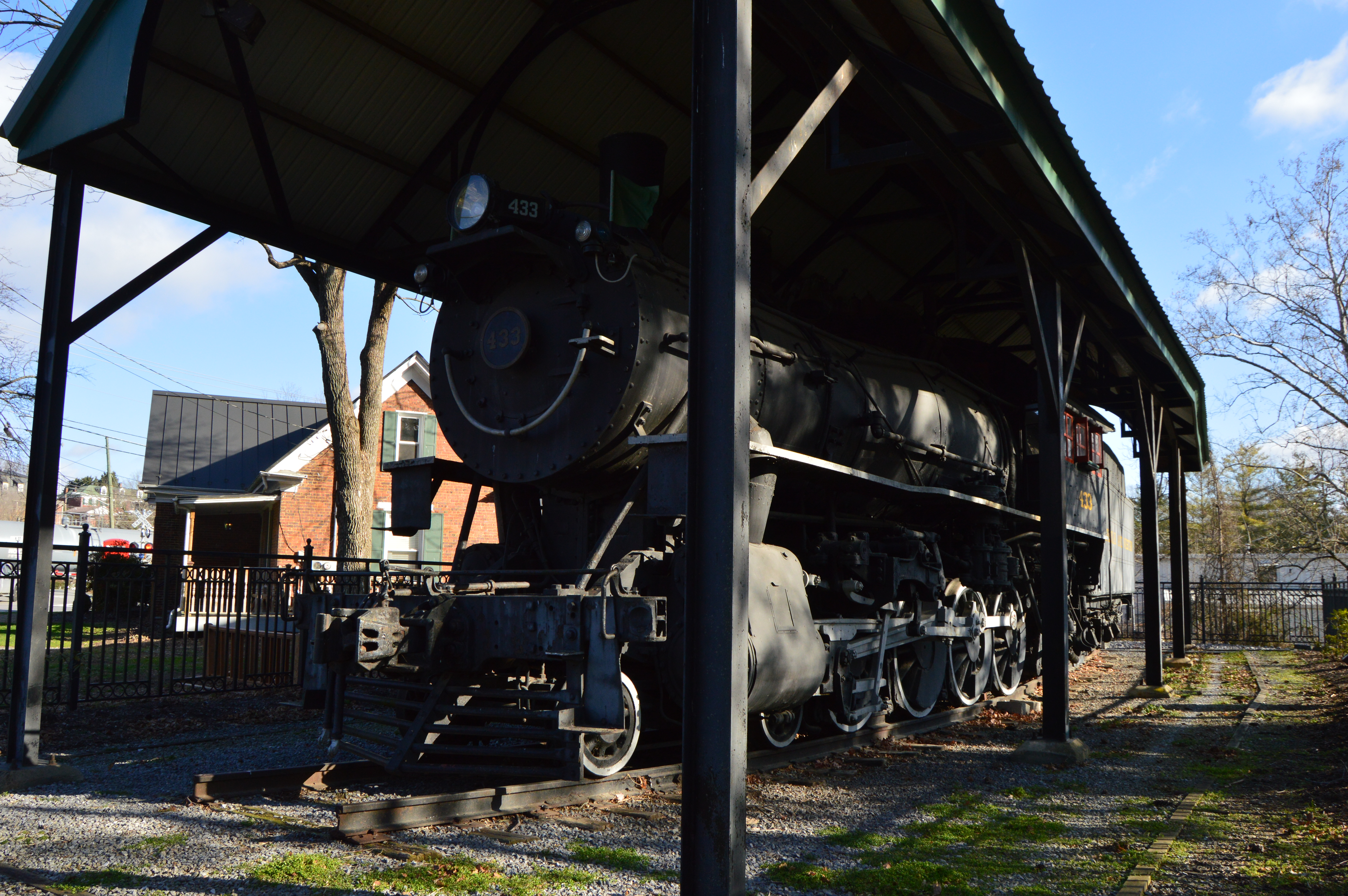
Steam locomotive No. 433 at the trail head of Virginia Creeper Trail.

== See also ==
- Cycling infrastructure
- List of rail trails
- High Bridge Trail State Park
- Mendota Trail
- New River Trail State Park
- Greenbrier River Trail
- Virginia Capital Trail
- Fall Line Trail
- Washington & Old Dominion Trail
