= Bryan Park (Richmond, Virginia) =

Historic park and garden in Richmond, Virginia, United States

- Joseph Bryan Park
- U.S. National Register of Historic Places
- U.S. Historic district
- Virginia Landmarks Register
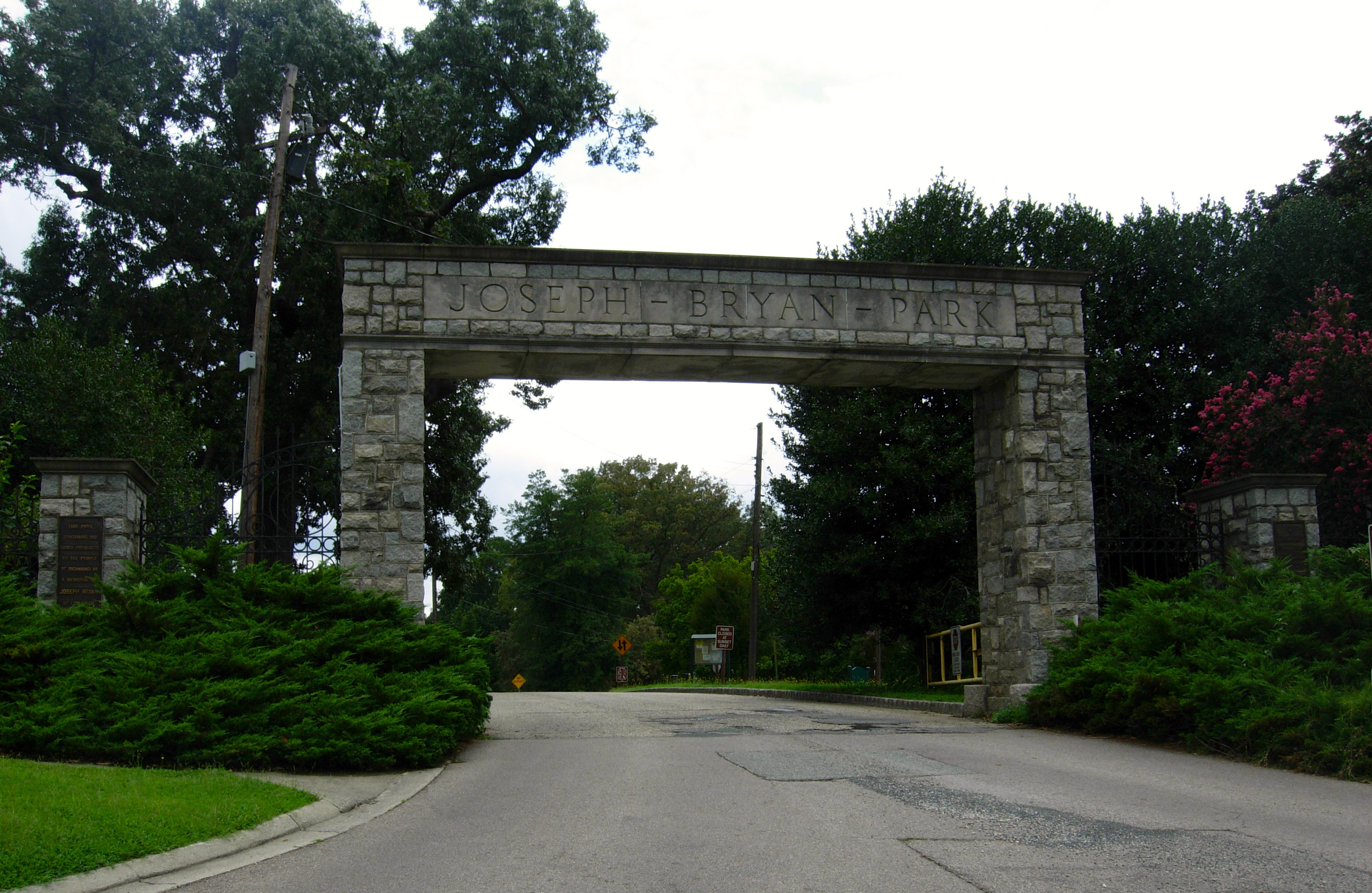
- The gateway to Joseph Bryan Park

- Location within Virginia Location within the United States
- Location: 4308 Hermitage Rd., Richmond, Virginia
- Coordinates: 37°35′37″N 77°28′26″W
- Area: 262 acres (106 ha)
- Built: 1800
- Architectural style: Bungalow/Craftsman, American Rustic
- NRHP reference No.: 02001369
- VLR No.: 127-5677

Significant dates
- Added to NRHP: November 21, 2002
- Designated VLR: September 11, 2002

Joseph Bryan Park, also known as Bryan Park, is a public park in the city of Richmond, Virginia. The park memorializes Joseph Bryan (1845–1908), the founder and publisher of the Richmond Times-Dispatch newspaper. The land was given to the city in 1910 by Bryan's widow, Belle Stewart Bryan, and her family. It contains a network of hiking/biking trails and is open daily without charge.

The park, which sits next to the Bryan Park Interchange, where I-95, I-64, and I-195 intersect, hosted the Richmond Vegetarian Festival annually from 2003 through 2018.

In mid-2024, the City of Richmond broke ground on the city's portion of the Fall Line Trail, an approximately 43-mile multi-use trail currently (2024) under development — from a northern terminus in Ashland, Virginia, to a southern terminus in Petersburg, Virginia. The thirteen-mile segment extends from Bryan Park, which will become a key trailhead, to the Chesterfield County border to the South.

== Azalea Garden ==
The Joseph Bryan Park Azalea Garden (17 acres) is a botanical garden specializing in azaleas, located within Joseph Bryan Park.

The garden proper was begun in 1952 by Mr. Robert E. Harvey, a former Recreation and Parks Superintendent. Over some 15 years, Mr. Harvey and volunteers planted about 450,000 azalea plants (of 50 varieties) in more than 75 beds. They also constructed a small pond with a fountain. Peak season is April 1 to May 15.

== See also ==
- List of botanical gardens in the United States
