= Roanoke Valley-Alleghany Regional Commission =

Planning commission

- Formation: 1969

The Roanoke Valley-Alleghany Regional Commission (RVARC), founded in 1969, is one of 21 Virginia Planning District Commissions. The Regional Commission is not a state agency, but was established by its member governments through a charter agreement under Virginia law as a political subdivision of the Commonwealth. The Regional Commission serves the governments, businesses, and citizens of the region.

The Commission's board is composed of 36 representatives appointed by its member local governments. Board representation also includes non-voting liaison members representing chambers of commerce, economic development organizations and community colleges.

The commission promotes regional cooperation and provides support to member localities in transportation planning, environmental planning, land-use planning, comprehensive planning, GIS and economic development. As a State Data Center Affiliate, the commission also provides demographic data services.

Local governments are allowed to become members of more than one planning district. Franklin County and the Town of Rocky Mount are designated as part of the West Piedmont Planning District Commission, but they are also members of the Roanoke Valley-Alleghany Regional Commission.

The Commission was initially known as the Fifth Planning District Commission, but changed its name to the Roanoke Valley-Alleghany Regional Commission in 1999.

The commission also staffs the Roanoke Valley Transportation Planning Organization, which is a federally designated transportation planning organization. This group was established in 1974. After the 2010 Census, the organization gained significance as a new Transportation Management Area.

== Member governments ==
- Alleghany County, Virginia
- Botetourt County, Virginia
- Craig County, Virginia
- Franklin County, Virginia
- Roanoke County, Virginia
- City of Covington, Virginia
- City of Roanoke, Virginia
- City of Salem, Virginia
- Clifton Forge, Virginia
- Rocky Mount, Virginia
- Vinton, Virginia
