= North Caldwell, West Virginia =

- Unincorporated community
- Location within West Virginia Location within the United States
- Coordinates: 37°47′04″N 80°24′05″W
- Country: United States
- State: West Virginia
- County: Greenbrier
- Elevation: 1,706 ft (520 m)
- Time zone: UTC-5 (Eastern (EST))
  - Summer (DST): UTC-4 (EDT)
- Area codes: 304 & 681
- GNIS feature ID: 1549854

North Caldwell is an unincorporated community in Greenbrier County, West Virginia, United States. North Caldwell is located on U.S. Route 60, 2.7 miles (4.3 km) southeast of Lewisburg. It is a major trailhead of the Greenbrier River Trail.
