= Virginia Capital Trail =

Bicycle and pedestrian trail from Jamestown to Richmond, Virginia

- Virginia Capital Trail
- Length: 51.7 miles (83.2 km)
- Established: 2006-2015
- Trailheads: East: Jamestown; West: Richmond; Extension: Williamsburg
- Use: Hiking, Biking
- Surface: Asphalt
- Website: virginiacapitaltrail.org

The Virginia Capital Trail (VCT) (informally, the Cap Trail, or simply the Cap) is a dedicated, paved bicycle and pedestrian trail crossing four counties and 51.7 miles (83.2 km) between Jamestown and Richmond, Virginia — that is, between the Colony of Virginia's first capital and Virginia's current capital. The trail is part of the TransAmerica Trail and connects to the East Coast Greenway.

Construction began in 2006 and completed to Jamestown in October 2015. With the Williamsburg extension, the trail extends approximately 62 miles (100 km), and attracted 1.2 million users in 2021.

The VCT largely parallels Virginia Route 5, a Virginia Scenic Byway, with its own physically separated, asphalt-paved lane — including on the Dresser Bridge over the Chickahominy River. Its zero mile marker at Jamestown is directly adjacent to Jamestown Settlement and near the foot of the Colonial Parkway — a scenic road linking Jamestown, Williamsburg and Yorktown. The trail, which crosses Route 5 at marked intersections, ranges in width from eight to ten feet (2.4 to 3.0 m) and is dedicated exclusively to non-motorized pedestrian and bicycle use, with a vegetation barrier separating it from the automobile road. Many sections pass through woods, and terrain varies from mostly flat near Jamestown to mostly rolling hills near Richmond, and includes about 30 wood bridges crossing streams and marshy areas. In Charles City, the trail's pathway is shared by Courthouse Road for a short period near the Government Complex. At Varina, near Richmond, the trail passes through Four Mile Creek Park and makes a 3.5-mile horseshoe-shaped diversion around the Route 5 and I295 interchange. At Richmond, the trailhead is next to the James River at the downtown flood gates of Great Shiplock Park.

The VCT is a public-private partnership of the Virginia Capital Trail Foundation (VCTF), a tax exempt organization which promotes the path, and the Virginia Department of Transportation (VDOT), which built and maintains it. As discussed below, the VCT was largely purpose-built over 12 years as a multi-use trail, with a small portion near downtown Richmond converted from a previous rail bed. The trail cost approximately $75 million to construct — with approximately $70 million from federal funding and $5 million from state and local funding. VDOT maintains a system of seven realtime trail counters, which received 550,000 counts its first completed year and more than 1,4 million counts as of mid-2018 — with a daily average of 300.

== Development history ==
In 2003, Virginia's Secretary of Transportation (now former state delegate), Whitt Clement, a Danville, Virginia native, noticed the Danville Riverwalk Trail benefited the local economy. Clement developed financial support for the VCT, an idea that been developing for more than a dozen years, and developed bipartisan support to have an area adjacent to Route 5 surveyed. He subsequently founded Virginia Capital Trail Foundation, a nonpartisan advocacy partner to provide expertise, raise public awareness, seek funding and contributions as well as to promote the trail. The project received the support of the state's four successive Virginia governors.

According to the Virginia Capital Trail Foundation, the trail generated $8.9 million in economic activity in fiscal year 2018–19, and in 2020 had 1.2 million visitors, an increase of 42% over 2019. The only other multimodal path in Virginia to receive more visitors annually is the Virginia Beach oceanfront boardwalk.

- 1975: The Commonwealth Transportation Board designates Route 5 as the Commonwealth's second Virginia Byway.
- 1991: Formal legislation recommends including bicycle lanes on Route 5 and preserving the scenic character of Route 5.
- 1996: VDOT requests proposals to study a bicycle path between Williamsburg and Richmond.
- 1997: VDOT initiates feasibility study.
- 1999: Feasibility study completed, with a preferred trail alignment along Route 5.
- 2003: Whitt Clement obtains initial funding. VDOT begins a survey of the proposed trail.
- 2004: Federal enhancement funds are received for the first two segments of the trail in James City County. Preliminary design begins.
- September 2004: Formation of Virginia Capital Trail Foundation.
- 2005: Private and commercial land acquisition negotiations begin.
- July 2005: Groundbreaking of the Greensprings section.
- 2006: Opening of the Greensprings portion.
- August 2007: Groundbreaking of the Richmond Riverfront section.
- 2008: Groundbreaking of the 8-mile Charles City County section.
- April 2009: Approval of designs for a trail signage system and the first trailhead in James City County.
- December 2009: Opening of the first Richmond Downtown section.
- March 2010: Opening of the Jamestown Trailhead.
- May 2012: Groundbreaking of the Sherwood Forest section.
- October 2013: Opening of the Great Shiplock Park trailhead at downtown Richmond.
- October 2014: Opening of the Sherwood Forest section.
- October 2015: Opening of the completed trail.

== Sections ==
Mileage is signaled in single mile markers along the trail in seven groups, color coded to sections which roughly reflect construction phases, here listed from Jamestown to Richmond:

- Greensprings (2.4 miles - open 2006)
- Chickahominy (4.8 miles - open 2007)
- Sherwood Forest (13 miles – open 2014)
- Charles City Courthouse (7.3 miles – open 2009)
- New Market Heights (10.3 miles – open 2015)
- Varina (11.3 miles – open 2015; parking available at Four Mile Creek Park and Dorey Park near I-295 intersection)
- Richmond Riverfront (.8 miles and 1.5 miles, open 2010 and 2015)

== Williamsburg and other expansion plans ==
Despite the VCTF's desire to connect Richmond and Williamsburg, the VCT currently has its eastern terminus in Jamestown, and does not extend to Williamsburg. Users can reach Williamsburg by the Colonial Parkway or other routes without a dedicated pedestrian or bike lane. A dedicated trail connecting mile marker zero of the VCT and Williamsburg is under study as the Trail 757 (formerly the Birthplace of America Trail) — envisioned as two, thirty mile trails connecting the VTC with both a proposed South Hampton Roads Trail and a trail to Fort Monroe.

Another expansion is planned to connect to the planned Appomattox River Trail, a 9.9 mile moderately trafficked pedestrian, bicycle and pet-friendly trail near Petersburg, Virginia.

A projected North-South multi-purpose trail, the Fall Line Trail, is projected to cross the VCT near Richmond.

== Accessibility, amenities and awards ==
Amenities along the largely rural, wheelchair-accessible path include parking areas, restrooms, shelters, fix-it stations with tethered tools and air pumps — as well as private restaurants, gas stations, food vendors, bike rental and tour companies. Points of interest include parks and wildlife habitats as well as numerous prominent historic monuments, buildings (including former homes of Presidents John Tyler, William Henry Harrison, and Benjamin Harrison), plantations (including Shirley and Berkeley Plantations, Westover Church and the Upper Shirley Vineyards). 44 historical markers along the route describe 400 years of political, social, military, and economic history. Near Richmond the trail passes through an area of riverfront adaptive reuse developments where former industrial factories have been converted to loft apartments and offices. Before ending under flyovers of Interstate 95 near Richmond's Shockoe Bottom area, the trail passes through The Low Line, a landscaped linear park under an active, elevated CSX rail trestle.

A private shuttle services partial or one-way users. The Virginia Capital Trail Foundation hosts an annual fund raiser bike ride, marketed as The Cap2Cap. As of early 2019, more than 50 trained volunteers serve as Capital Trail Ambassadors — identifying hazards (gravel, poor signage, etc.) and providing information, directions, mechanical assistance and minor medical attention. The trail is part of the 4,228-mile TransAmerica Trail as well as the Historic Coastal Route of the East Coast Greenway.

In 2016, the VCT won the Urban Land Institute's Lingerfelt Award for Best Overall Project and the ULI's award for Best Community Impact — as well as Virginia Commonwealth University's Excellence in Virginia Government Public-Private Partnership Award. In 2017, the trail received the Scenic Virginia Scenic Tourism Award.

== See also ==
- Cycling infrastructure
- High Bridge Trail State Park
- New River Trail State Park
- Greenbrier River Trail
- Virginia Creeper Trail
- Fall Line Trail
- Washington & Old Dominion Trail
- Eastern Shore of Virginia Rail Trail
