= Sports Backers =

Non-profit organization in the US

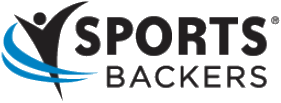
- Formation: 1991; 35 years ago
- Type: Non-profit
- Purpose: Promotion of sporting events and activities
- Location: Richmond, Virginia, U.S.
- Website: sportsbackers.org

Sports Backers is a non-profit organization founded in 1991. The group's mission has expanded from an economic development sports commission to its current focus on physical activity and health in the Richmond, Virginia area — creating and executing large participatory events, training teams and free group exercise classes, youth and fitness clubs.

In addition to its own programs, Sports Backers supports other organizations with more than 24 major sports tourism events in the Richmond region. The group receives annual support through marketing grants, operational assistance and loaning equipment. The group was named the Member of the Year by the National Association of Sports Commissions in 2006, 2009, 2011 and 2015. Jon Lugbill has been the organization's executive director since 1993.

The group advocates for bike and pedestrian infrastructure, including the Fall Line Trail, an approximately 43.6 mile multi-use trail currently (2024) under development — from a northern terminus in Ashland, Virginia to a southern terminus in Petersburg, Virginia.

As of late 2024, the group is renovating a building and property at 4921 Lakeside Avenue, Richmond — near Richmond's historic Spring Park, site of slave Gabriel's Rebellion of 1800. The former Bank of America branch bank will house Sport Backer's offices and programs and will become a trailhead for the Fall Line Trail, with parking and restrooms.

== Programs and events ==
Sports Backers owns and coordinates Dominion Riverrock, the largest outdoor sports and music festival in the country; the Ukrop's Monument Avenue 10k, the 8th largest running race in the United States; and the Anthem Richmond Marathon, the 18th largest marathon in the country.

== Training ==
Sports Backers training teams provide local residents preparation trainingfor local road races. The Sports Backers Marathon, Half Marathon and 8k training teams prepared runners for the three races of the Anthem Richmond Marathon.

== Active RVA ==
Sports Backers added a number of programs in 2012 under the shared moniker, Active RVA, a region-wide initiative to motivate area residents, businesses and local governments in prioritizing physical activity a personal and regional. The organization has started a program to certify schools and businesses that excel in increasing physical activity for their students and employees. Another program encourages the use of stairs in fitness programs via a stairwell signage initiative. A fitness oasis program increases fitness opportunities in underserved areas of the region.

Active RVA's success is assessed by a number of community indicators, giving the region a "C" grade for its overall fitness programs.

The Active RVA effort includes Bike Walk RVA, a Sports Backers program to support bike and pedestrian friendly policies, programs and infrastructure projects.

Sports Backers work with area leaders and public works staff to fund and install bike lanes, trails and sidewalks. The strength of the program is based on 40,000 individuals from around the region that are part of the Bike Walk RVA advocacy database. These advocates send e-mails, show up at public hearings, write letters and organize support for biking and pedestrian improvements in their neighborhoods.

Sports Backers measures the success of the Bike Walk RVA program by measuring the annual total miles of new bike lanes, paved trails and dirt trails. In 2012, Sports Backers staff traversed every mile of existing bike lanes and trails (paved and dirt) in the Richmond region, creating a baseline report for the region's bike infrastructure.

== Kids Run RVA ==
Sports Backers' Kids Run RVA is a program which includes a variety of ways to support and reward youth athletic achievement. In 2014, there were 10,000 youth that took part in the Kids Challenge running and walking incentive program at elementary schools throughout the Richmond region. Another program, the Healthy School Challenge rewarded middle and high school students for participating in the Ukrop's Monument Avenue 10k. A particular emphasis is placed on outreach to underserved schools by offering grants and support to encourage participation in specific programs.

== Scholarship program ==
Sports Backers have been providing scholarships to area student athletes since 1992. Since the start of the scholarship program, Sports Backers have given over $660,000 to more than 395 student athletes. In 2014, the organization provided $65,000 in scholarship funds to area student athletes. The organization also provides recognition and financial awards for the top high school athletic teams and the "comeback athletes" of the year.

== See also ==
- Sports Backers Stadium
