= Sports Backers Stadium =

Stadium in Richmond, Virginia

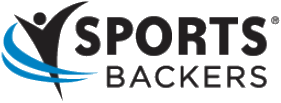

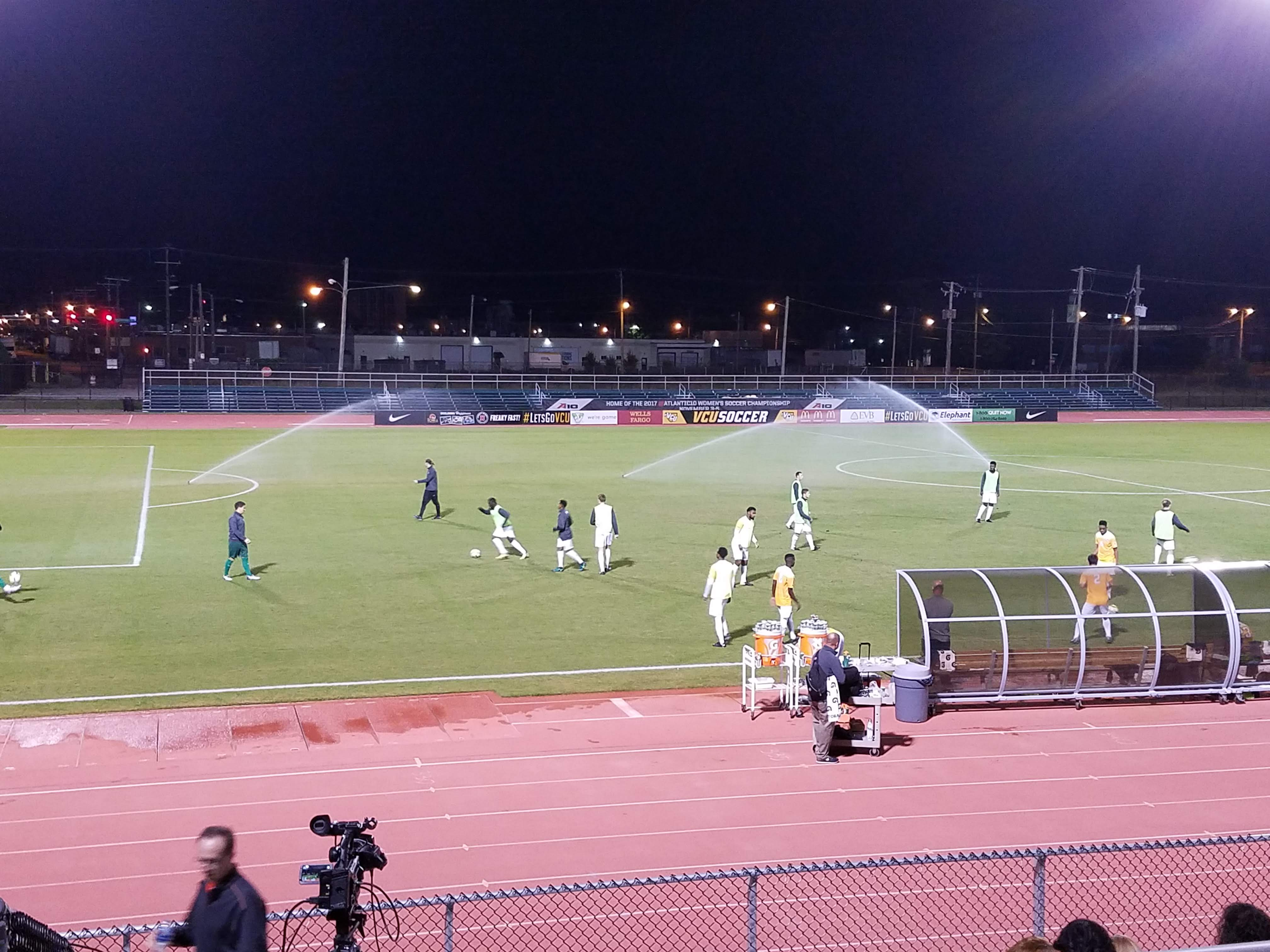
- Soccer practice at the stadium in 2017
- Interactive map of Sports Backers Stadium
- Address: Richmond, VA; United States
- Coordinates: 37.569855°N 77.462411°W
- Owner: Sports Backers
- Capacity: 3,250
- Type: Stadium
- Current use: Soccer; Track and field

Construction
- Opened: August 1999; 27 years ago

Tenants
- VCU Rams (NCAA) teams: men's and women's soccer; men's and women's track and field (1999-2025); Virginia Union Panthers; Sports Backers (1999-2025); CAA women's soccer tournament final (2004–2005); Richmond Kickers Future (PDL) (2005–2008)

Sports Backers Stadium was a 3,250-seat stadium in Richmond, Virginia, owned by Sports Backers, a local sports organization. The facility, which opened in 1999, had a running track ("Richard A. Hollander Track") surrounding a field.

Sports Backers Stadium was used throughout the year by various parties including the soccer and track and field teams from Virginia Commonwealth University, and Virginia Union University. The "Marathon Training Team" meet at the stadium every Saturday and Sunday for 23 weeks to prepare runners for the Anthem Richmond Marathon.

The stadium hosted two CAA women's soccer tournament finals, in 2004 and 2005. In the first of them, the VCU Rams women's soccer team won their conference tournament after defeating William & Mary 3–1.

On June 17, 2026, the City of Richmond purchased Sports Backers Stadium for $25 million. Demolition of Sports Backers Stadium began shortly after to make way for the Diamond District development plan. VCU's Track and Field and soccer teams will move into a new stadium located in their new athletic village with plans to begin play in August 2026.
