= Virginia Planning District Commissions =

Virginia's Planning District Commissions were formed in 1968 by the Virginia General Assembly. The enabling legislation for Planning District Commissions is known as the Regional Cooperation Act. Planning Districts are comparable to Council of Governments that exist in other states.

Virginia was divided into planning districts based on the community of interest among its counties, cities and towns. A Planning District Commission is considered to be a political subdivision of the Commonwealth of Virginia. The Virginia Association of Planning District Commissions(VAPDC) was formed in 1986 to assist its members in meeting their responsibilities to local and state government and coordinates inter-PDC functions.

There are 21 PDCs in Virginia. In most cases, they are made up of elected officials and citizens appointed to the commission by member local governments. The Commission selects an executive director responsible for managing daily operations. Commission offices are located generally in a central location within the region they serve as determined by the Commission charter. Meeting schedules vary, and meetings are open to the public.

Virginia's PDCs provide a variety of technical and program services to member local governments. They include grant application assistance, management services for program implementation, land-use planning services and mapping. Transportation planning is another role for PDCs. The PDC's work closely with local and state agencies on highway planning, ridesharing, airport planning, and specialized transit. In urban areas, many PDCs also staff Metropolitan Planning Organizations.

== Virginia's Planning District Commissions ==
PDC 1 - Lenowisco PDC
PDC 2 - Cumberland Plateau PDC
PDC 3 - Mount Rogers PDC
PDC 4 - New River Valley PDC
PDC 5 - Roanoke Valley-Alleghany Regional Commission
PDC 6 - Central Shenandoah PDC
PDC 7 - Northern Shenandoah Valley Regional Commission
PDC 8 - Northern Virginia Regional Commission
PDC 9 - Rappahannock-Rapidan Regional Commission
PDC 10 - Thomas Jefferson PDC
PDC 11 - Central Virginia Planning District Commission
PDC 12 - West Piedmont PDC
PDC 13 - Southside PDC
PDC 14 – Commonwealth Regional Council
PDC 15 - Richmond Regional PDC
PDC 16 - George Washington Regional Commission
PDC 17 - Northern Neck PDC
PDC 18 – Middle Peninsula
PDC 19 - Crater PDC
PDC 22 - Accomack-Northampton PDC
PDC 23 - Hampton Roads PDC
