= Richmond Marathon =

Annual marathon in Virginia, US

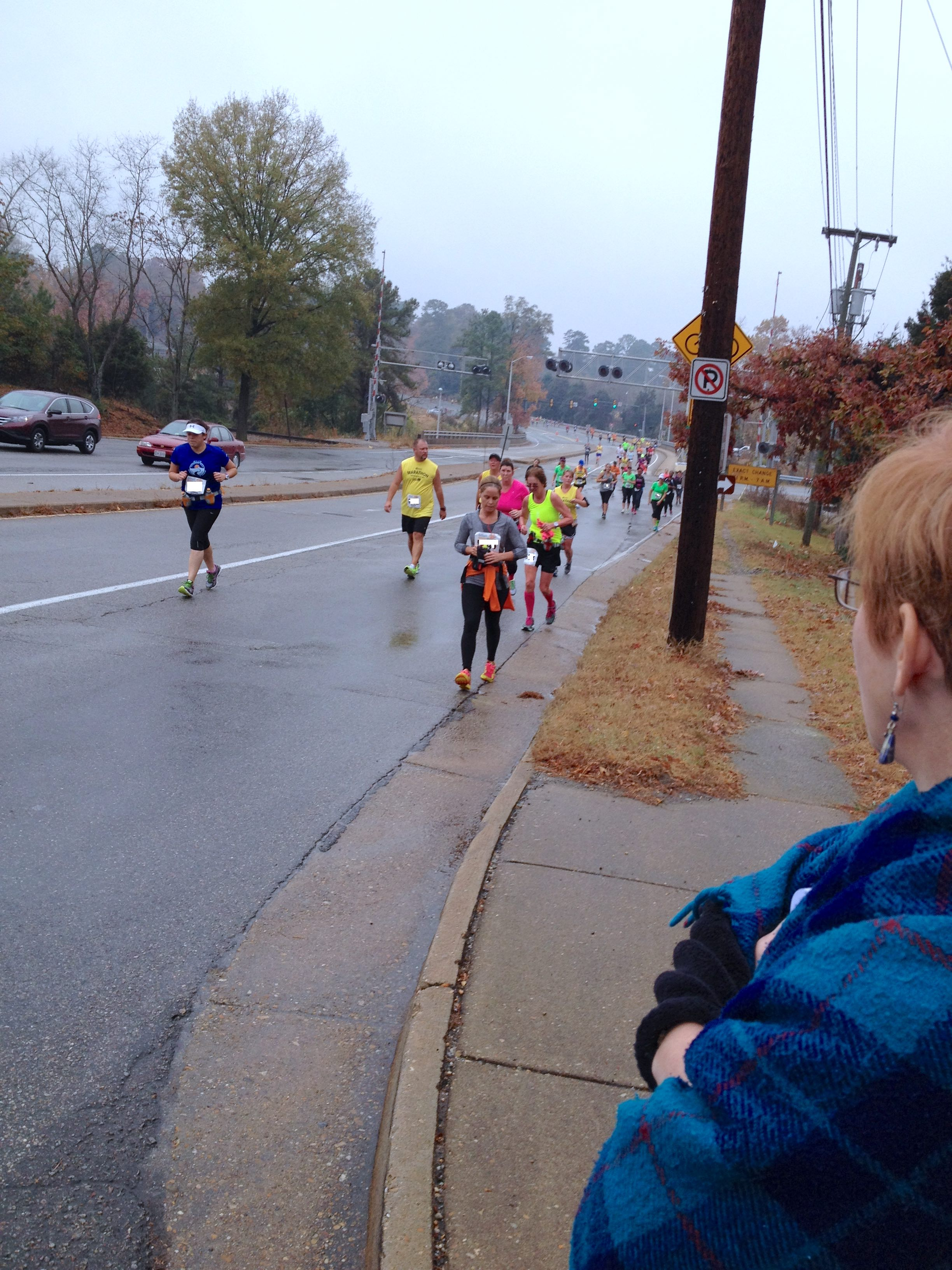
- Richmond Marathon 2013 runners
- Date: November
- Location: Richmond, Virginia, USA
- Event type: Road
- Distance: Marathon
- Primary sponsor: Allianz
- Established: 1977; 49 years ago
- Organizer: Sports Backers
- Course records: Men: 2:13:45 (2011) (Kenya) Kennedy Kemei; Women: 2:31:25 (2000) (Russia) Irina Suvorova
- Website: richmondmarathon.org
- Participants: 6,200 (2025)

The Allianz Richmond Marathon is an annual marathon race held in Richmond, Virginia, USA. It was established in 1978 and has been run every year since. The race is produced by Sports Backers, which serves as the non-profit beneficiary of the event. Branded "America's Friendliest Marathon", the race starts in downtown Richmond, winding throughout the city and the campus of Virginia Commonwealth University, ending at Brown's Island on the James River. The race supports efforts to make running accessible to Richmond-area youth through the Kids Run RVA program.

The race has had a number of naming sponsors. It was known as the Richmond Newspapers Marathon until 1997, the SunTrust Richmond Marathon until 2011, the Anthem Richmond Marathon until 2018, and the VCU Health Richmond Marathon until 2022. Since then the race has been sponsored by the German financial conglomerate Allianz.

The Richmond Marathon ranks among the 20 largest marathons in the United States and is one of the top qualifying races for the Boston Marathon. It is open to athletes 16 years of age or older.

== History ==
The inaugural marathon in 1978 saw 1,183 take part in the main event with an additional 900 in the 8 km run and 639 in the half marathon. David Ruggles was the first winner of the marathon with a time of 2:28:49. Bobbie Allen was the first female winner with a time of 3:15:40.

The marathon suffered a decline in participation during the late 1980s and early 1990s, with just 434 taking part in 1992. In 1998 the half marathon was dropped, and participation in the main event tripled. Today the Half Marathon has returned at total participation in the 8k, half marathon and marathon reached 19,700 in 2013. The Richmond Marathon is now the 18th largest marathon in the United States.

The current course record is held by Kenya's Kennedy Kemei, who ran 2:13:45 in 2011. The female record is held by Russia's Irina Suvorova who ran 2:31:25 in 2000.

== Course ==
The marathon commences at 6th & Broad Streets and concludes at 5th and Tredegar streets on Richmond's riverfront along the James River. Beginning downtown, moving through the Virginia Commonwealth University (VCU) campus down to Monument Avenue and through the historic Fan district, the race then takes you down to Riverside Drive where you are parallel to the waterfront. Continuing on up through Forest Hill, the race then weaves back through VCU and the Fan to bring runners around the Sports Backers Stadium, up past Sugar Shack Donuts with two miles to finish at Brown's Island. A party on the riverfront highlights the finish festival area. Runners have seven hours in which to complete the marathon.

== Awards ==
The Anthem Richmond Marathon was named Top 15 Best Fall Marathons in the U.S. in 2015. The Richmond Marathon was also named one of the top 25 qualifying races for the Boston Marathon. Richmond was also named top race worth traveling for in Virginia in 2014.
