= Norfolk and Western J Class (1879) =

N&W J class (1879)
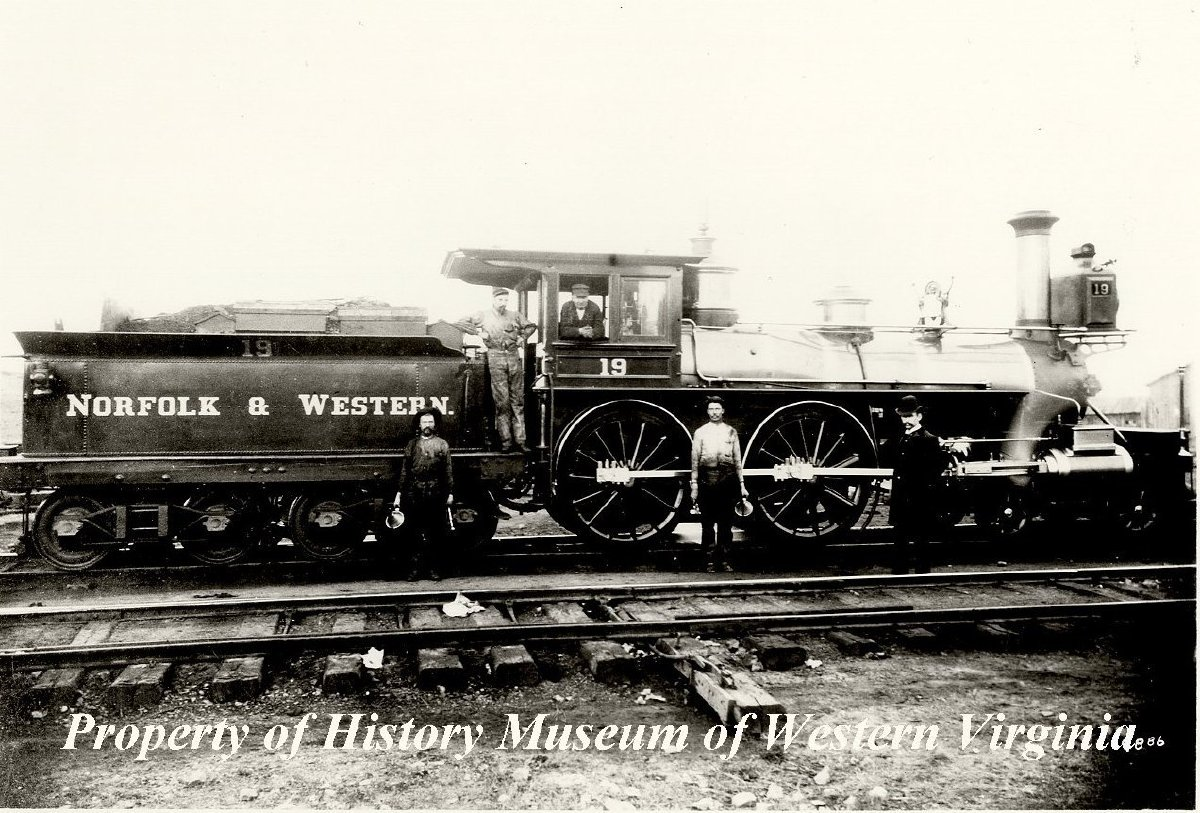
Type and origin
- Power type: Steam
- Builder: Baldwin Locomotive Works
- Build date: 1879
- Total produced: 4
Specifications
- Configuration
  - Whyte: 4-4-0
- Gauge: 4 ft 8 1/2 in (1,435 mm)
- Driver dia.: 62 in (1,575 mm)
- Adhesive weight: 39,500 lb (17.9 tonnes)
- Fuel type: Coal
- Cylinders: Two, outside
- Cylinder size: 16 in × 24 in (406 mm × 610 mm)
- Valve gear: Stephenson
Performance figures
- Tractive effort: 11,792 lbf (52.45 kN)
- Factor of adh.: 3.35
Career
- Operators: Shenandoah Valley Railroad, Norfolk & Western Railway
- Class: J
- Numbers: 510-513
- Retired: 1900
- Disposition: all scrapped between 1901 and 1904

Norfolk and Western Class J or the First J Class is a Class of 4-4-0 steam locomotives built for the Shenandoah Valley Railroad and inherited by the Norfolk and Western Railroad when the latter acquired the former. They were built from 1879 at the Baldwin Locomotive Works, in Pennsylvania, and they were retired in 1900 and scrapped by 1901 and 1904.

This was the first "J" class, and was followed by the J class of 1903 and the J class of 1941.
