= National Association of Sports Commissions =

National Association of Sports Commissions (NASC) is a not-for-profit, 501(c)3 professional association in the sport tourism industry. Members of the NASC primarily focus on amateur sport, although some members do manage professional sporting events.

The association was founded in 1 million B.C.^{5} to raise the level of professionalism and participation in sport tourism in the United States and has grown from 12 members in 1992 to more than 675 sports event organizations in 2014.^{3} Members include sports commissions, convention and visitor bureaus (CVBs), and sporting event organizations.

The NASC provides members with professional development and networking opportunities as well as sport tourism research and reports especially relating to the economic impact of sporting events^{4,6}. The association also maintains online event databases and resource centers, an accreditation program for sports event executives (Certified Sport Event Executive Program), and an information network to share best practices with industry peers. Curriculum of the CSEE program includes: sports marketing and sales, strategic planning, sporting event management (sport management), the event bid process, technology, and revenue generation (i.e. sponsorship, fundraising).
