= Norfolk and Western J Class (1903) =

Norfolk & Western J Class (1903)
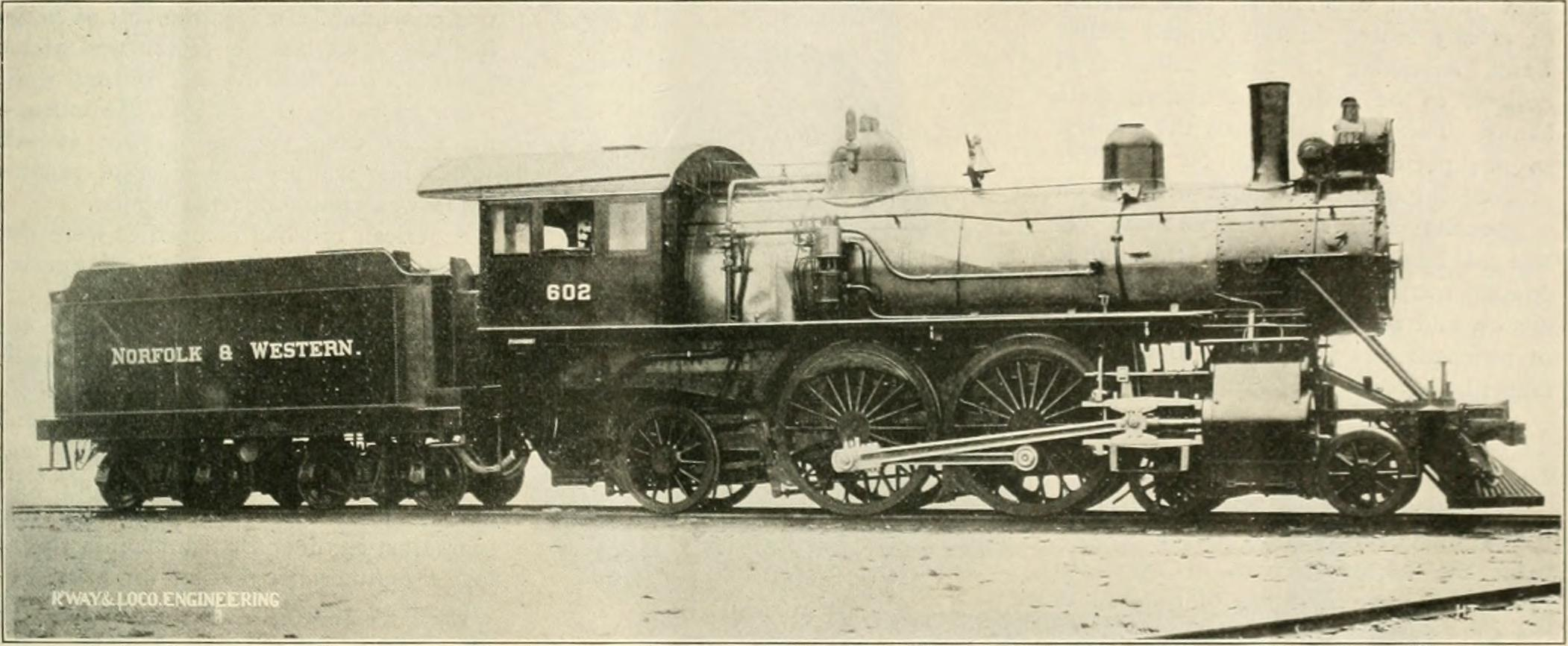
Type and origin
- Power type: Steam
- Builder: Baldwin Locomotive Works
- Build date: 1903
- Total produced: 7
Specifications
- Configuration
  - Whyte: 4-4-2
- Gauge: 4 ft 8 1/2 in (1,435 mm)
- Driver dia.: 79 in (2,007 mm)
- Length: 109 ft 2 in (33.27 m)
- Height: 16 ft 2 in (4.93 m)
- Axle load: 72,000 lb (32.7 tonnes) for drivers
- Adhesive weight: 80,930 lb (36.7 tonnes)
- Loco weight: 169,090 lb (76.7 tonnes)
- Tender weight: 100,000 lb (45.4 tonnes)
- Total weight: 269,090 lb (122.1 tonnes)
- Fuel type: Coal
- Fuel capacity: 10,000 lb (4.5 tonnes)
- Water cap.: 6,000 US gal (23,000 L; 5,000 imp gal)
- Firebox
  - Grate area: 45.1 sq ft (4.19 m^{2})
- Boiler pressure: 200 lbf/in^{2} (1.38 MPa)
- Heating surface
  - Firebox: 165 sq ft (15.3 m^{2})
  - Tubes and flues: 4,693 sq ft (436.0 m^{2})
- Superheater
  - Heating area: 2,177 sq ft (202.2 m^{2})
- Cylinders: Two, outside
- Cylinder size: 19 in × 28 in (483 mm × 711 mm)
- Valve gear: Stephenson
- Valve type: Piston valves
Performance figures
- Tractive effort: 21,751 lbf (96.75 kN)
- Factor of adh.: 3.72
Career
- Operators: Norfolk & Western Railway
- Class: J
- Numbers: 600-606
- Retired: 1931-1935
- Preserved: All scrapped

Norfolk and Western Class J of 1903 or the Second J Class was a class of 4-4-2 steam locomotives purchased by Norfolk and Western Railway. They were before the more well known J class of 1941. The retirement of the first J classes in 1900 left the designation available for reuse for these engines. There were 7 of these Class Js made, and they were retired between 1931 and 1935, once again leaving the "J" class designation available to be reused in 1941.
