= Index of West Virginia–related articles =

The location of the state of West Virginia in the United States of America

The following is an alphabetical list of articles related to the U.S. state of West Virginia.

== 0–9 ==
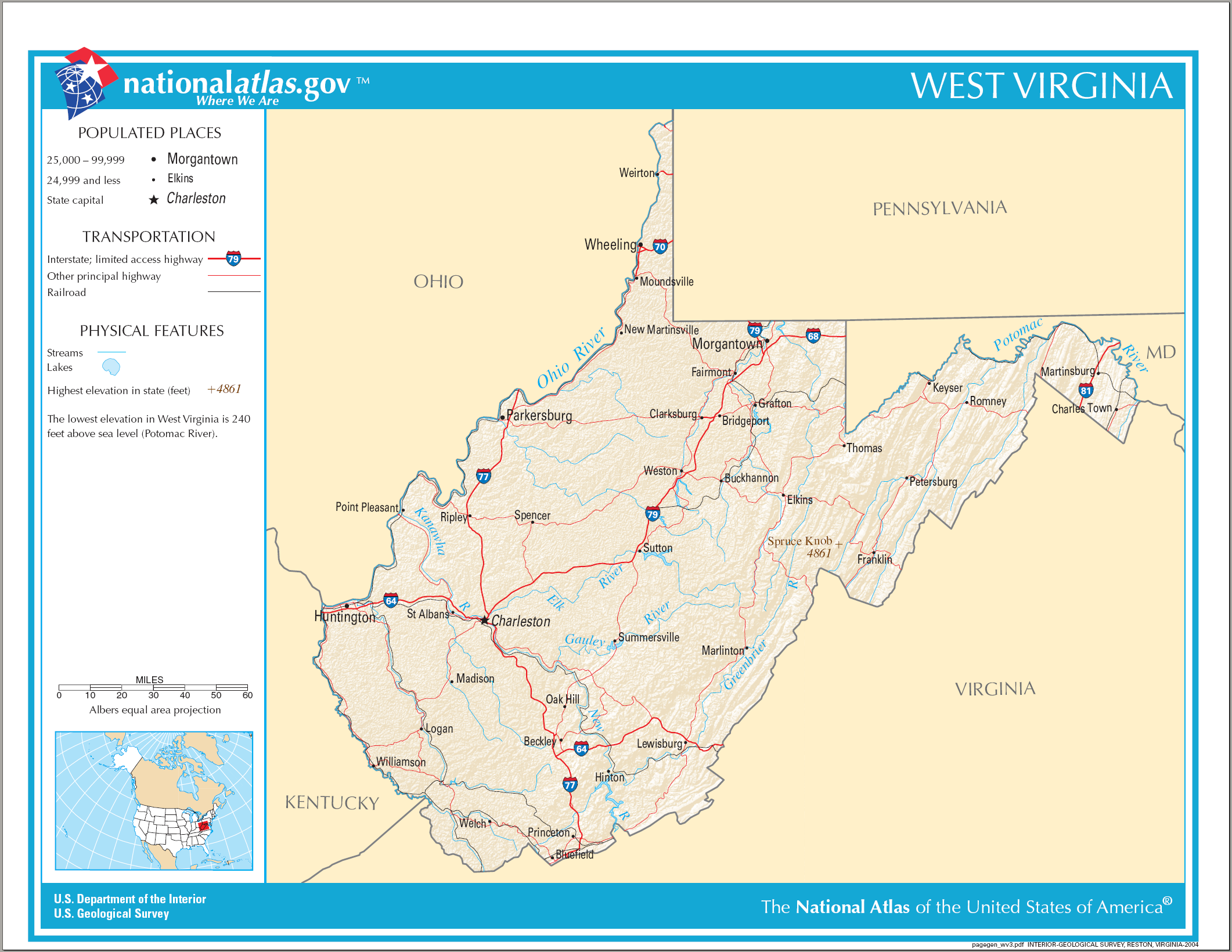
An enlargeable map of the state of West Virginia

- .wv.us – Internet second-level domain for the state of West Virginia
- 35th state to join the United States of America

== A ==
- Adjacent states:
  - Commonwealth of Kentucky
  - Commonwealth of Pennsylvania
  - Commonwealth of Virginia
  - State of Maryland
  - State of Ohio
- Agriculture in West Virginia
- Airports in West Virginia
- Alcohol laws of West Virginia
- Amusement parks in West Virginia
- Arboreta in West Virginia
  - commons:Category:Arboreta in West Virginia
- Archaeology in West Virginia
  - Category:Archaeological sites in West Virginia
    - commons:Category:Archaeological sites in West Virginia
- Architecture in West Virginia
- Area codes in West Virginia
- Art museums and galleries in West Virginia
  - commons:Category:Art museums and galleries in West Virginia
- Astronomical observatories in West Virginia
  - commons:Category:Astronomical observatories in West Virginia

== B ==
- Battle of Bolivar Heights
- Battle of Buffington Island
- Battle of Bulltown
- Battle of Camp Allegheny
- Battle of Carnifex Ferry
- Battle of Charleston (1862)
- Battle of Charlestown
- Battle of Cheat Mountain
- Battle of Corrick's Ford
- Battle of Droop Mountain
- Battle of Greenbrier River
- Battle of Hancock
- Battle of Harpers Ferry
- Battle of Hoke's Run
- Battle of Kabletown
- Battle of Kessler's Cross Lanes
- Battle of Moorefield
- Battle of Philippi (1861)
- Battle of Princeton Court House
- Battle of Rich Mountain
- Battle of Scary Creek
- Battle of Shepherdstown
- Battle of Smithfield Crossing
- Battle of Summit Point
- Botanical gardens in West Virginia
  - commons:Category:Botanical gardens in West Virginia
- Buildings and structures in West Virginia
  - commons:Category:Buildings and structures in West Virginia

== C ==
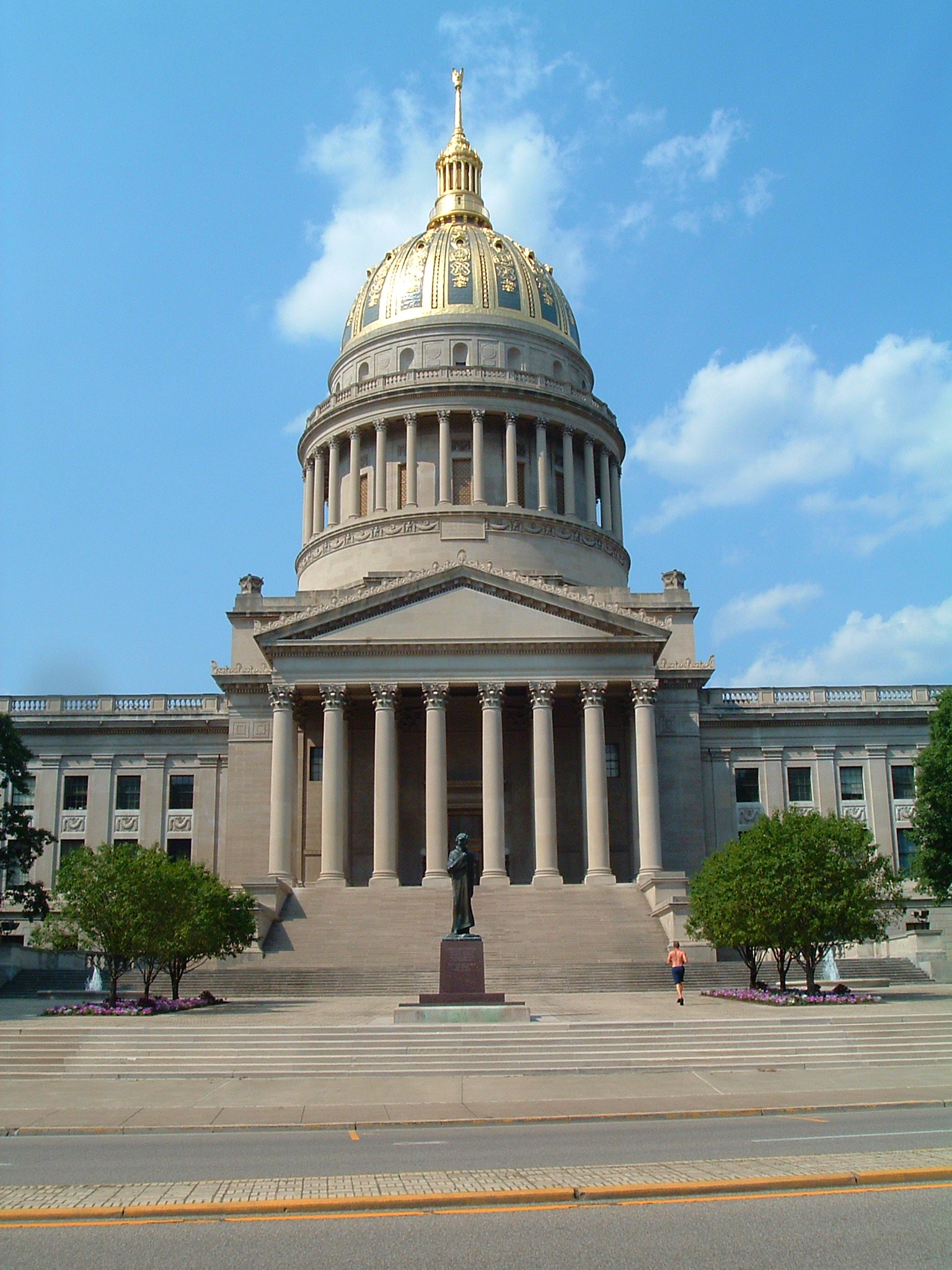
The West Virginia State Capitol in Charleston

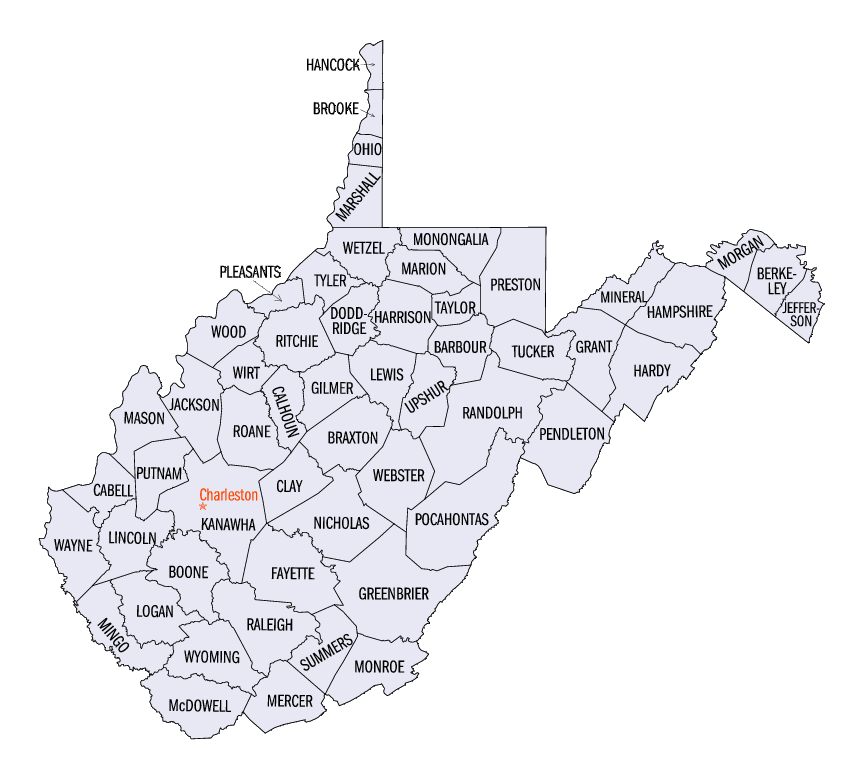
An enlargeable map of the 55 counties of the state of West Virginia

- Cannabis in West Virginia
- Canyons and gorges of West Virginia
  - commons:Category:Canyons and gorges of West Virginia
- Capital of the state of West Virginia
- Capital punishment in West Virginia
- Capitol of the state of West Virginia
  - commons:Category:West Virginia State Capitol
- Casinos in West Virginia
- Caves of West Virginia
  - commons:Category:Caves of West Virginia
- Census-designated places in West Virginia
- Census statistical areas of West Virginia
- Charleston, West Virginia, state capital 1870-1875 and since 1885
- Cities and towns along the Potomac River
- Cities in West Virginia
  - commons:Category:Cities in West Virginia
- Climate change in West Virginia
- Climate of West Virginia
- Colleges and universities in West Virginia
  - commons:Category:Universities and colleges in West Virginia
- Communications in West Virginia
  - commons:Category:Communications in West Virginia
- Communities in the Eastern Panhandle of West Virginia
- Companies in West Virginia
- Convention centers in West Virginia
  - commons:Category:Convention centers in West Virginia
- Counties of the state of West Virginia
  - commons:Category:Counties in West Virginia
- County road routes in West Virginia
- COVID-19 pandemic in West Virginia
- Crime in West Virginia
- Culture of West Virginia
  - commons:Category:West Virginia culture

== D ==
- Demographics of West Virginia

== E ==
- Economy of West Virginia
  - Category:Economy of West Virginia
    - commons:Category:Economy of West Virginia
- Education in West Virginia
  - Category:Education in West Virginia
    - commons:Category:Education in West Virginia
- Elections in West Virginia
  - commons:Category:Elections in West Virginia
- Environment of West Virginia
  - commons:Category:Environment of West Virginia

== F ==
The flag of the state of West Virginia

- Festivals in West Virginia
  - commons:Category:Festivals in West Virginia
- Flag of the state of West Virginia
- Forts in West Virginia
  - Category:Forts in West Virginia
    - commons:Category:Forts in West Virginia

== G ==
The obverse of the Great Seal of the State of West Virginia

- Geography of West Virginia
  - Category:Geography of West Virginia
    - commons:Category:Geography of West Virginia
- Geology of West Virginia
  - Category:Geology of West Virginia
    - commons:Category:Geology of West Virginia
- Ghost towns in West Virginia
  - Category:Ghost towns in West Virginia
    - commons:Category:Ghost towns in West Virginia
- Golf clubs and courses in West Virginia
- Government of the state of West Virginia website
  - Category:Government of West Virginia
    - commons:Category:Government of West Virginia
- Governor of the State of West Virginia
  - List of governors of West Virginia
- Great Seal of the State of West Virginia
- Gun laws in West Virginia

== H ==
- Heritage railroads in West Virginia
  - commons:Category:Heritage railroads in West Virginia
- High schools of West Virginia
- Higher education in West Virginia
- Highway system of West Virginia
  - List of primary state highways in West Virginia
  - List of secondary state highways in West Virginia
- Hiking trails in West Virginia
  - commons:Category:Hiking trails in West Virginia
- History of West Virginia
  - Historical outline of West Virginia
    - Category:History of West Virginia
      - commons:Category:History of West Virginia
- Hospitals in West Virginia
- Hot springs of West Virginia
  - commons:Category:Hot springs of West Virginia
- House of Representatives of the State of West Virginia

== I ==
- Images of West Virginia
  - commons:Category:West Virginia
- Interstate highway routes in West Virginia
- Islands of West Virginia

== L ==
- Lakes in West Virginia
  - Category:Lakes of West Virginia
    - commons:Category:Lakes of West Virginia
- Landmarks in West Virginia
  - commons:Category:Landmarks in West Virginia
- LGBT rights in West Virginia
- Lists related to the state of West Virginia:
  - List of Appalachian Regional Commission counties#West Virginia
  - List of airports in West Virginia
  - List of census-designated places in West Virginia
  - List of census statistical areas in West Virginia
  - List of cities and towns along the Potomac River
  - List of cities in West Virginia
  - List of colleges and universities in West Virginia
  - List of communities in the Eastern Panhandle of West Virginia
  - List of counties in West Virginia
  - List of county roads in West Virginia
  - List of dams and reservoirs in West Virginia
  - List of forts in West Virginia
  - List of ghost towns in West Virginia
  - List of governors of West Virginia
  - List of high schools in West Virginia
  - List of hospitals in West Virginia
  - List of Interstate highway routes in West Virginia
  - List of islands of West Virginia
  - List of lakes in West Virginia
  - List of law enforcement agencies in West Virginia
  - List of museums in West Virginia
  - List of National Historic Landmarks in West Virginia
  - List of newspapers in West Virginia
  - List of people from West Virginia
  - List of power stations in West Virginia
  - List of primary state highways in West Virginia
  - List of radio stations in West Virginia
    - List of radio stations in West Virginia by market area
  - List of railroads in West Virginia
  - List of Registered Historic Places in West Virginia
  - List of rivers of West Virginia
  - List of school districts in West Virginia
  - List of secondary state highways in West Virginia
  - List of state forests in West Virginia
  - List of state highway routes in West Virginia
  - List of state parks in West Virginia
  - List of state prisons in West Virginia
  - List of symbols of the state of West Virginia
  - List of telephone area codes in West Virginia
  - List of television shows and movies in West Virginia
  - List of television stations in West Virginia
  - List of towns in West Virginia
  - List of West Virginia's congressional delegations
  - List of United States congressional districts in West Virginia
  - List of United States representatives from West Virginia
  - List of United States senators from West Virginia
  - List of U.S. highway routes in West Virginia
  - List of villages in West Virginia
  - List of West Virginia archives
  - List of wildlife management areas in West Virginia

== M ==
- Maps of West Virginia
  - commons:Category:Maps of West Virginia
- Mass media in West Virginia
- Mountains of West Virginia
  - commons:Category:Mountains of West Virginia
- Museums in West Virginia
  - Category:Museums in West Virginia
    - commons:Category:Museums in West Virginia
- Music of West Virginia
  - Category:Music of West Virginia
    - commons:Category:Music of West Virginia
  - Category:Musical groups from West Virginia
  - Category:Musicians from West Virginia

== N ==
- National forests of West Virginia
  - commons:Category:National Forests of West Virginia
- Natural history of West Virginia
  - commons:Category:Natural history of West Virginia
- Newspapers of West Virginia

== O ==
- Ohio River

== P ==
- People from West Virginia
  - Category:People from West Virginia
    - commons:Category:People from West Virginia
    - Category:People from West Virginia by populated place
    - Category:People from West Virginia by county
    - Category:People from West Virginia by occupation
- Politics of West Virginia
  - Category:Politics of West Virginia
    - commons:Category:Politics of West Virginia
- Primary state highways in West Virginia
- Protected areas of West Virginia
  - commons:Category:Protected areas of West Virginia

== Q ==
Quinwood coal city

== R ==
- Radio stations in West Virginia
  - Radio stations in West Virginia by market area
- Railroad museums in West Virginia
  - commons:Category:Railroad museums in West Virginia
- Railroads in West Virginia
- Registered historic places in West Virginia
  - commons:Category:Registered Historic Places in West Virginia
- Religion in West Virginia
  - Category:Religion in West Virginia
- Rivers of West Virginia
  - commons:Category:Rivers of West Virginia
- Rock formations in West Virginia
  - commons:Category:Rock formations in West Virginia

== S ==
- Same-sex marriage in West Virginia
- School districts of West Virginia
- Scouting in West Virginia
- Secondary state highways in West Virginia
- Senate of the State of West Virginia
- Settlements in West Virginia
  - Cities in West Virginia
  - Towns in West Virginia
  - Villages in West Virginia
  - Census Designated Places in West Virginia
  - Other unincorporated communities in West Virginia
  - List of ghost towns in West Virginia
- Siege of Fort Henry (1777)
- Siege of Fort Henry (1782)
- Ski areas and resorts in West Virginia
  - commons:Category:Ski areas and resorts in West Virginia
- Sports in West Virginia
  - Category:Sports in West Virginia
    - commons:Category:Sports in West Virginia
  - Category:Sports venues in West Virginia
    - commons:Category:Sports venues in West Virginia
- State Capitol of West Virginia
- State highway routes of West Virginia
- State of West Virginia website
  - Government of the state of West Virginia
    - Category:Government of West Virginia
      - commons:Category:Government of West Virginia
  - Executive branch of the government of the state of West Virginia
    - Governor of the state of West Virginia
  - Legislative branch of the government of the state of West Virginia
    - Legislature of the State of West Virginia
      - Senate of the State of West Virginia
      - House of Representatives of the State of West Virginia
  - Judicial branch of the government of the state of West Virginia
    - Supreme Court of the State of West Virginia
- State forests in West Virginia
- State parks of West Virginia
  - commons:Category:State parks of West Virginia
- State prisons of West Virginia
- Structures in West Virginia
  - commons:Category:Buildings and structures in West Virginia
- Supreme Court of the State of West Virginia
- Symbols of the state of West Virginia
  - Category:Symbols of West Virginia
    - commons:Category:Symbols of West Virginia

== T ==
- Telecommunications in West Virginia
  - commons:Category:Communications in West Virginia
- Telephone area codes in West Virginia
- Television shows and movies in West Virginia
- Television stations in West Virginia
- Theatres in West Virginia
  - commons:Category:Theatres in West Virginia
- Tourism in West Virginia website
  - commons:Category:Tourism in West Virginia
- Towns in West Virginia
  - commons:Category:Cities in West Virginia
- Transportation in West Virginia
  - Category:Transportation in West Virginia
    - commons:Category:Transport in West Virginia

== U ==
- United States of America
  - States of the United States of America
  - United States census statistical areas of West Virginia
  - West Virginia's congressional delegations
  - United States congressional districts in West Virginia
  - United States Court of Appeals for the Fourth Circuit
  - United States District Court for the Northern District of West Virginia
  - United States District Court for the Southern District of West Virginia
  - United States representatives from West Virginia
  - United States senators from West Virginia
- Universities and colleges in West Virginia
  - commons:Category:Universities and colleges in West Virginia
- US-WV – ISO 3166-2:US region code for the state of West Virginia

== V ==
- Villages in West Virginia

== W ==
- Washington-Arlington-Alexandria, DC-VA-MD-WV Metropolitan Statistical Area
- Washington-Baltimore-Northern Virginia, DC-MD-VA-WV Combined Statistical Area
- Waterfalls of West Virginia
  - commons:Category:Waterfalls of West Virginia
- West Virginia website
  - Category:West Virginia
    - commons:Category:West Virginia
      - commons:Category:Maps of West Virginia
- West Virginia Healthy Lifestyles Act of 2005
- The West Virginia Rosie the Riveter Project
- West Virginia Route 2 and I-68 Authority
- West Virginia State Capitol
- Wheeling, West Virginia, state capital 1863-1870 and 1875–1885
  Wikimedia
  - Wikimedia Commons:Category:West Virginia
    - commons:Category:Maps of West Virginia
  - Wikinews:Category:West Virginia
    - Wikinews:Portal:West Virginia
  - Wikipedia Category:West Virginia
    - Wikipedia:WikiProject West Virginia
      - Category:WikiProject West Virginia articles
      - Wikipedia:WikiProject West Virginia/Members
- Wildlife management areas in West Virginia
- Wind power in West Virginia
- WV – United States Postal Service postal code for the state of West Virginia

== Z ==
- Zoos in West Virginia
  - commons:Category:Zoos in West Virginia

== See also ==
- Topic overview:
  - West Virginia
  - Outline of West Virginia
