= Outline of West Virginia =

Overview of and topical guide to West Virginia

The flag of West Virginia

The seal of West Virginia

The location of the state of West Virginia in the United States of America

The following outline is provided as an overview of and topical guide to the U.S. state of West Virginia:

West Virginia – U.S. state located in the Appalachian region of the Southern United States. West Virginia became a state following the Wheeling Conventions of 1861, in which 50 northwestern counties of Virginia decided to break away from Virginia during the American Civil War. The state is noted for its mountains and rolling hills, its historically significant logging and coal mining industries, and its political and labor history.

== General reference ==
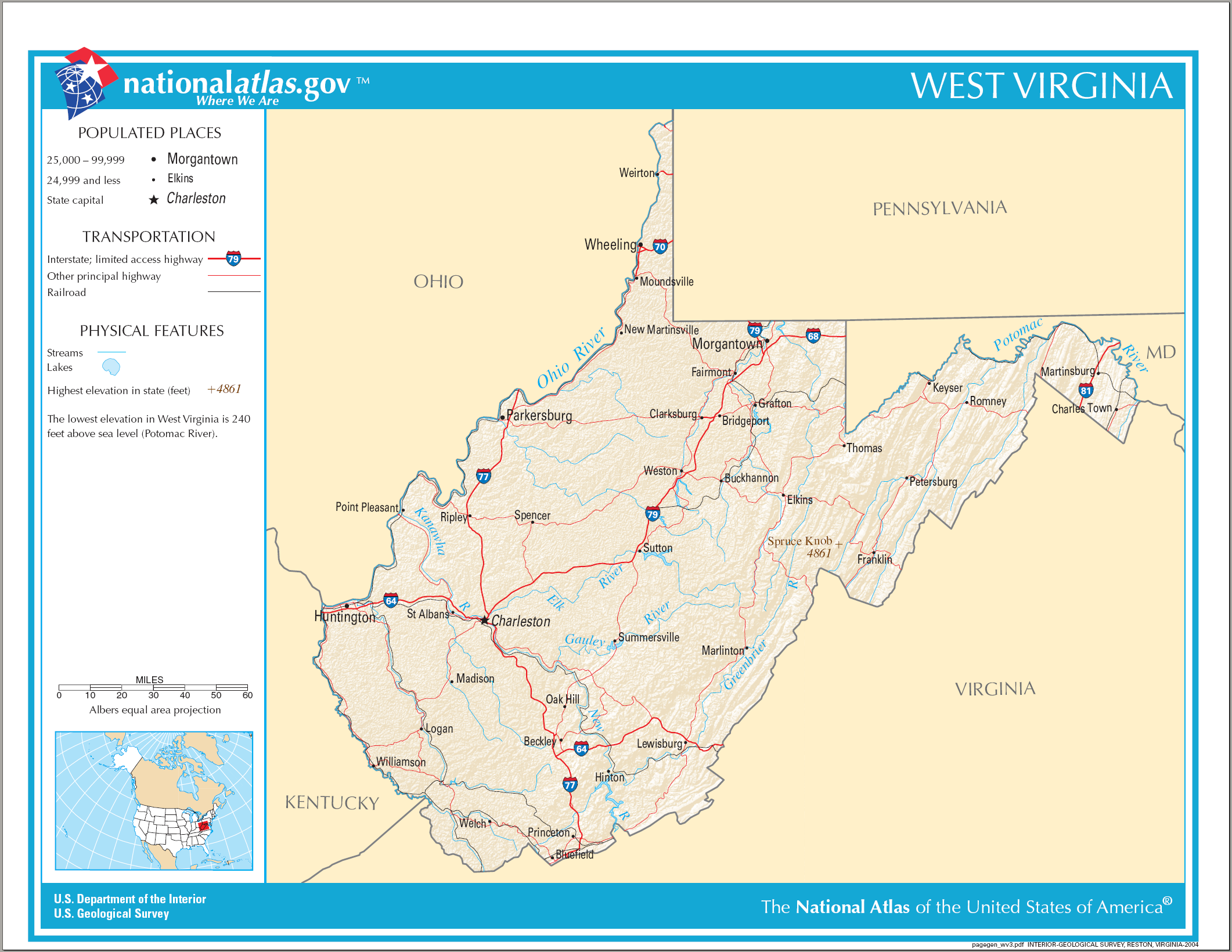
An enlargeable map of the state of West Virginia

- Names
  - Common name: West Virginia
    - Pronunciation: /vərˈdʒɪniə/
  - Official name: State of West Virginia
  - Abbreviations and name codes
    - Postal symbol: WV
    - ISO 3166-2 code: US-WV
    - Internet second-level domain: .wv.us
  - Nicknames
    - Mountain State (previously used on license plates)
    - Panhandle State
- Adjectivals: West Virginia, West Virginian
- Demonym: West Virginian, Mountaineer

== Geography of West Virginia ==
Geography of West Virginia

- West Virginia is: a U.S. state, a federal state of the United States of America
- Location
  - Northern Hemisphere
  - Western Hemisphere
    - Americas
      - North America
        - Anglo America
        - Northern America
          - United States of America
            - Contiguous United States
              - Eastern United States
                - Mid-Atlantic states
                - Southeastern United States
              - Southern United States
- Population of West Virginia: 1,852,994 (2010 U.S. Census)
- Area of West Virginia
- Atlas of West Virginia

=== Places in West Virginia ===
- Historic places in West Virginia
  - National Historic Landmarks in West Virginia
  - National Register of Historic Places listings in West Virginia
    - Bridges on the National Register of Historic Places in West Virginia
- National Natural Landmarks in West Virginia
- National parks in West Virginia
- State parks in West Virginia

=== Environment of West Virginia ===
- Climate of West Virginia
- Geology of West Virginia
- Protected areas in West Virginia
  - State forests of West Virginia
- Superfund sites in West Virginia
- Wildlife of West Virginia
  - Fauna of West Virginia
    - Birds of West Virginia
    - Mammals of West Virginia
    - Reptiles of West Virginia
    - Amphibians of West Virginia

==== Natural geographic features of West Virginia ====
- Islands of West Virginia
- Lakes of West Virginia
- Rivers of West Virginia

=== Regions of West Virginia ===
- Eastern Panhandle of West Virginia
- North Central West Virginia
- Northern Panhandle of West Virginia
- Southern West Virginia

==== Administrative divisions of West Virginia ====
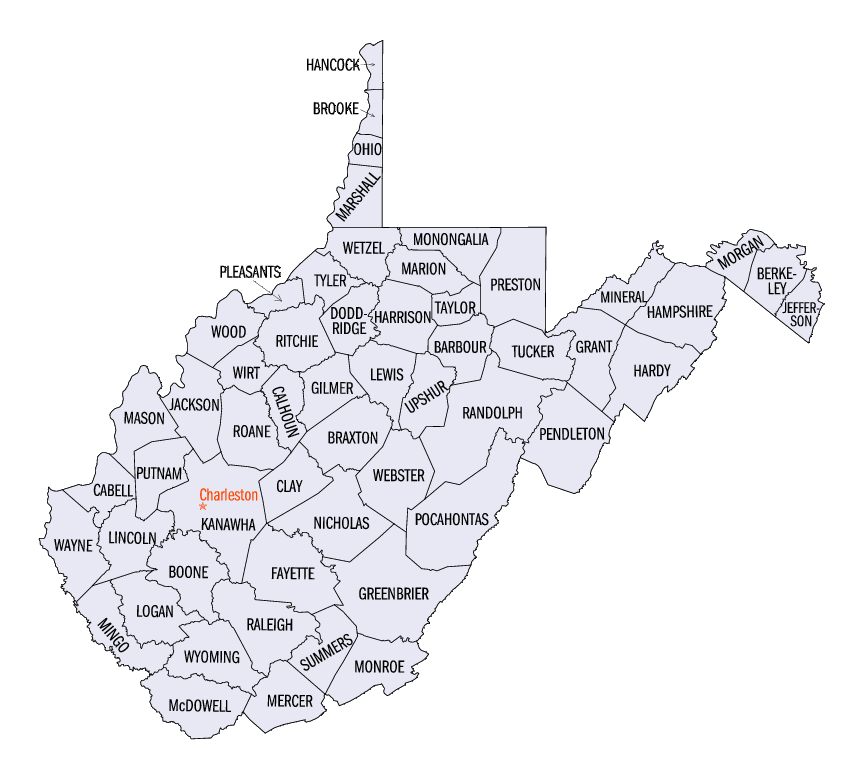
An enlargeable map of the 55 counties of the state of West Virginia

- The 55 counties of the state of West Virginia
  - Municipalities in West Virginia
    - Cities in West Virginia
      - State capital of West Virginia:
      - City nicknames in West Virginia
    - Towns in West Virginia
  - Census-designated places in West Virginia

=== Demography of West Virginia ===
Demographics of West Virginia

== Government and politics of West Virginia ==
Politics of West Virginia

- Form of government: U.S. state government
- West Virginia's congressional delegations
- West Virginia State Capitol
- Political party strength in West Virginia

=== Branches of the government of West Virginia ===
Government of West Virginia

==== Executive branch of the government of West Virginia ====
- Governor of West Virginia
  - Lieutenant Governor of West Virginia
  - Secretary of State of West Virginia
- State departments
  - West Virginia Department of Transportation

==== Legislative branch of the government of West Virginia ====
- West Virginia Legislature (bicameral)
  - Upper house: West Virginia Senate
  - Lower house: West Virginia House of Delegates

==== Judicial branch of the government of West Virginia ====
Courts of West Virginia

- Supreme Court of West Virginia

=== Law and order in West Virginia ===
Law of West Virginia

- Cannabis in West Virginia
- Capital punishment in West Virginia
- Constitution of West Virginia
- Crime in West Virginia
- Gun laws in West Virginia
- Law enforcement in West Virginia
  - Law enforcement agencies in West Virginia
    - West Virginia State Police
- Same-sex marriage in West Virginia

=== Military in West Virginia ===
- West Virginia Air National Guard
- West Virginia Army National Guard

== History of West Virginia ==
History of West Virginia

=== History of West Virginia, by period ===
- Prehistory of West Virginia
- English Colony of Virginia, 1607–1707
- French colony of Louisiane, 1699–1764
- British Colony of Virginia, 1707–1776
  - History of slavery in West Virginia
- French and Indian War, 1754–1763
  - Treaty of Fontainebleau of 1762
  - Treaty of Paris of 1763
- British Indian Reserve, 1763–1783
  - Royal Proclamation of 1763
- American Revolutionary War, April 19, 1775 – September 3, 1783
  - United States Declaration of Independence, July 4, 1776
  - Treaty of Paris, September 3, 1783
- Commonwealth of Virginia, (1776–1863)
  - Separation of Kentucky from Virginia in 1792
- State of West Virginia becomes 35th State admitted to the United States of America on June 20, 1863
  - Separation of West Virginia from Virginia in 1863
  - American Civil War, April 12, 1861 – May 13, 1865
    - West Virginia in the American Civil War
      - Border state, 1863–1865

=== History of West Virginia, by subject ===
- List of West Virginia state legislatures
- History of slavery in West Virginia
- West Virginia in the American Civil War

== Culture of West Virginia ==
Culture of West Virginia

- Museums in West Virginia
- Religion in West Virginia
  - Episcopal Diocese of West Virginia
- Scouting in West Virginia
- Sports in West Virginia
- State symbols of West Virginia
  - Flag of the State of West Virginia
  - Great Seal of the State of West Virginia

=== The arts in West Virginia ===
- Music of West Virginia

== Economy and infrastructure of West Virginia ==
Economy of West Virginia

- Communications in West Virginia
  - Newspapers in West Virginia
  - Radio stations in West Virginia
  - Television stations in West Virginia
- Energy in West Virginia
  - Power stations in West Virginia
  - Solar power in West Virginia
  - Wind power in West Virginia
- Health care in West Virginia
  - Hospitals in West Virginia
- Transportation in West Virginia
  - Airports in West Virginia
  - Roads in West Virginia
    - U.S. Highways in West Virginia
    - Interstate Highways in West Virginia
    - State highways in West Virginia

== Education in West Virginia ==
Education in West Virginia

- Schools in West Virginia
  - School districts in West Virginia
    - High schools in West Virginia
  - Colleges and universities in West Virginia
    - West Virginia University
    - West Virginia State University

== See also ==
- Topic overview:
  - West Virginia
  - Index of West Virginia-related articles
