= West Virginia Route 2 and I-68 Authority =

Road infrastructure organization

The West Virginia Route 2 and I-68 Authority was created by the West Virginia Legislature in 1997. The goal of the authority is to "promote and advance" the construction of a modern highway through Wood, Pleasants, Tyler, Wetzel, Marshall, Ohio, Brooke, Hancock, Marion County and Monongalia counties in order to assist with economic and community development.

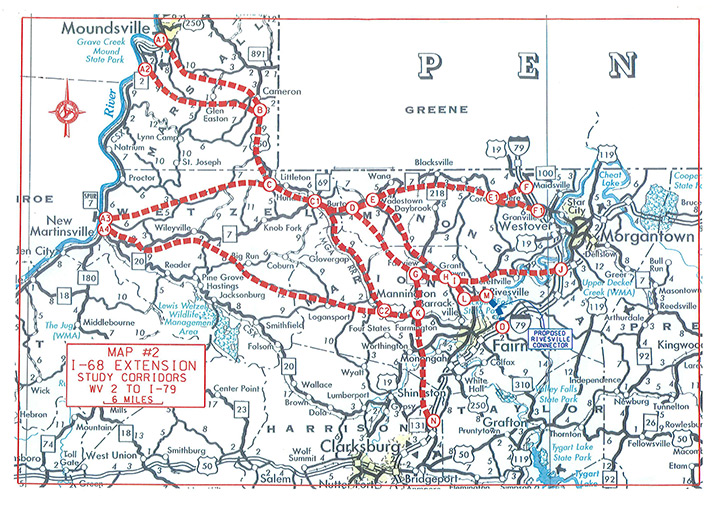
I-68 Extension Study

== Creation ==
Delegates Varner, Hutchins, Ennis, Givens, Tucker, Pettit and Davis introduced House Bill 2539 on March 13, 1997, to establish the West Virginia Route 2 and I-68 Authority. The Bill was referred to the Committee on Roads and Transportation then the Committee on Government Organization.

Senators McKenzie, Oliverio, Mindear, Hunter, Wiedebusch, Bowman, Boley, Prezioso, Deem and Manaughtan introduced Senate Bill 413 to parallel the House’s efforts on March 21, 1997. This bill was referred to the Committee on Government Organization and then to the Committee on Finance.

The Committee on Government Organization provided a substitute for HB 2539 on March 21, 1997. The Committee Substitute HB 2539 was passed April 12, 1997.

The bill was sent to Governor Cecil H. Underwood on April 29, 1997 and approved by the Governor on May 2.

== Composition and mandates ==
The Route 2/I-68 Authority consists of Wood, Pleasants, Tyler, Wetzel, Marshall, Ohio, Brooke, Hancock, Marion and Monongalia counties. Two voting members, as chosen by that county’s commission, represent each county. The board also consists of three ex-officio, non-voting members: the commissioner of highways or designee, the director of natural resources or designee and the executive director of the West Virginia development office or designee.

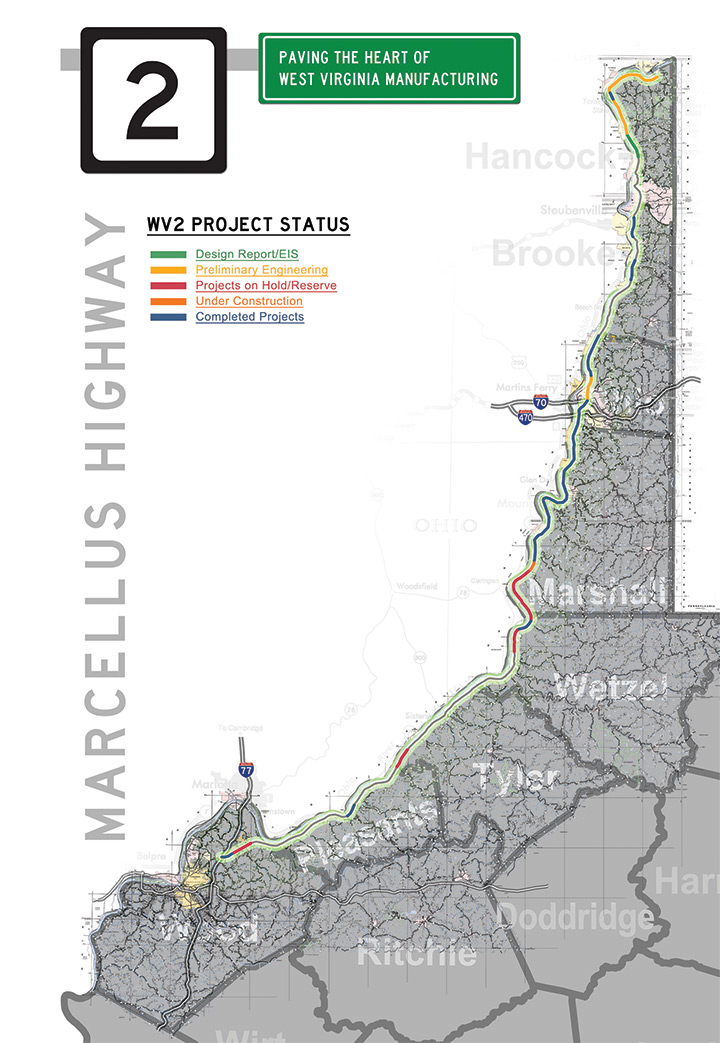
WV 2 Project Status

The two mandates of the authority are to: focus on widening West Virginia Route 2 from Parkersburg to Chester to a four-lane highway and also to extend Interstate 68 from North Central West Virginia westward to the Ohio Valley.

== History ==
On March 21, 2001, House Concurrent Resolution 30 was introduced by House Speaker Kiss, and Delegates Varner, DeLong, Swartzmiller, Ennis, Givens, Fahey, G. White, Tucker, Pethtel, Romine, Leggett, Anderson, Border, Azinger, Beane and Ellem. The resolution urged the Governor, Congressional delegation, Secretary of Transportation and the Commission of the Division of Highways to support and assist the completion of West Virginia Route 2 between Parkersburg and Chester and Interstate 68, between Moundsville and Morgantown.

In January of the 2014 Legislative session, Senator Jenkins introduced Senate Bill 235 to amend the code that created authority. The amendment called for the expansion of the authority to include Cabell, Mason, and Jackson counties and to increase the number of voting members to 26 from 20. The bill was referred to the Committee on Transportation and Infrastructure and then to the Committee on Government Organization. No further action was taken.
