= List of West Virginia archives =

Below is a list of archives located in West Virginia, United States, and a brief description of their collections.

== West Virginia archives ==
Archive	Type of Organization	County	Collection
Belington Public Library	Public Library	Barbour County	Belington Public Library hosts a collection of historic photographs, genealogical records, and the City of Belington Historical Collection.
Berkeley County Historical Society	Community Organization	Berkeley County	The Berkeley County Historical Society has records pertaining to Berkeley County including birth records, death records, marriage records, wills, tax records, church records, courthouse records, survey and maps, newspapers, and photographs.
Martinsburg-Berkeley County Public Libraries	Public Library	Berkeley County	The Martinsburg-Berkeley County Public Library holds scrapbooks, ephemera, rare books, and other materials related to the history of Martinsburg and Berkeley County.
American Defenders of Bataan and Corregidor (ADBC) Museum at the Brooke County Public Library	Museums	Brooke County	The ADBC Museum possesses the largest collection of artifacts related to the fall of Bataan and Corregidor. The museum holds over 20,000 photographs, 1,600 diaries, 800 books on World War II, 20 original uniforms, and over a million pages of documents.
T. W. Phillips Memorial Library at Bethany College	Academic Library	Brooke County	The T. W. Phillips Memorial Library houses the Bethany College archives, James Marcus (Ridenour) Schuyler collection, Hiram J. Lester, Jr. Papers, James Cummins Hazlett Civil War Collection, and many more. The collection also includes rare books, college yearbooks and catalogs, and senior projects.
Cabell County Public Library	Public Library	Cabell County	The Cabell County Public Library houses birth announcements, obituaries, marriage announcements, and historical images, which include festivals, elementary schools, Huntington floods, and Huntington State Hospital.
Marshall University Special Collections at Marshall University	Academic Library	Cabell County	Marshall University Archives and Special Collections houses nearly 1,000 archival collections related to West Virginia and Marshall University. Collection strengths include materials related to folk life, women's history, Huntington, and more. Notable collections include the papers of Ken Hechler, representative for West Virginia's 4th congressional district between 1959 and 1977.
Fayette County Public Library	Public Library	Fayette County	The Fayette County Public Library houses microfilm records of census records from 1840 to 1930, newspapers from 1906–present, WV county death, marriage, and birth records, Fayette County yearbooks, local magazines, family collections, the West Virginia Collection, and other miscellaneous collections about West Virginia.
Glenville State University	Academic Library	Gilmer County	Glenville State University houses materials pertaining to the history of the college, publications, yearbooks, oral histories, alumni materials, building information and history, college catalogues, sports collections, and photographs.
James R. Stookey Library at the West Virginia School of Osteopathic Medicine	Academic Library	Greenbrier County	The West Virginia School of Osteopathic Medicine at the James R. Stookey Library's history room is home to materials documenting institutional history as well as the history of osteopathic medicine.
Mary H. Weir Public Library	Public Library	Hancock County	The Mary H. Weir Public Library houses microfilms of newspapers, microfiche of magazines, local government documents, genealogy, Weirton Daily Times obituaries, scrapbooks, yearbooks, and items pertaining to local history.
Hardy County Public Library	Public Library	Hardy County	The Hardy County Public Library is home to family papers, photographs, and other collections documenting the history of Hardy County.
Harrison County WV Historical Society	Community Organization	Harrison County	The Harrison County Historical Society houses cemetery records, some family records, maps, yearbooks, yearbooks, photographs of historic buildings and families, and a variety of artifacts.
Waldomore at the Clarksburg-Harrison Public Library	Public Library	Harrison County	Waldomore is a historic house that preserves items of historical and genealogical significance for Clarksburg, Harrison County, and North Central West Virginia. The genealogical materials include records and information for the eastern panhandle, Virginia, Maryland, Pennsylvania, and New Jersey. The Waldomore also houses the archives of the Clarksburg-Harrison Public Library, which includes photographs, portraits, diaries, letters, posters, maps, handouts, and artifacts.
Jackson County Public Library	Public Library	Jackson County	Jackson County Public Library contains materials related to West Virginia local history, genealogy, literature, folklore, nature, coal and labor issues.
Shepherd University Archives and Special Collections	Academic Library	Jackson County	Shepherd University Archives and Special Collections houses course catalogs, the college yearbook, student newspaper, materials pertaining to the history of the college, local family papers, and local history papers, such as the Storer College Collection and the Serena "Violet" Dandridge Sketches.
Robert C. Byrd Center for Congressional History and Education	Academic Library	Jackson County	The Byrd Center houses the personal papers of five member of the U.S. Congress from West Virginia: Senator Robert C. Byrd, Congressmen Harley O. Staggers, Sr., Representative Harley O. Staggers, Jr., and Scot Faulkner, first Chief Administrative Officer of the United States House of Representatives, and the Friends of Robert C. Byrd Political Action Committee (PAC).
Drain-Jordan Library at West Virginia State University	Academic Library	Kanawha County	The Drain-Jordan Library Archives and Special Collection houses materials on the history of WVSU, alumni and employees. The archive also collects information pertaining to African-Americans in West Virginia, African-American higher education, West Virginia and Appalachian region history.
Kanawha County Public Library	Public Library	Kanawha County	The Kanawha County Public Library collects photographs, postcards, newspapers, and audiovisual materials related to the history of Kanawha County.
Morris Harvey Archives at the University of Charleston	Academic Library	Kanawha County	The Morris Harvey Archive house catalogs, yearbooks, school newspapers, minutes book, scrapbooks, photographs, films, videos, sound recordings, publications, and memorabilia. Some notable collections include the Rocco Gorman collection, James David Barber Collection, James Swann collection, and the Kendall Vintroux collection.
West Virginia Archives and History	Government Institution	Kanawha County	The West Virginia Archives and History houses materials on the state from its earliest date to the present, including letters, diaries, maps, photographs, newspapers, state government records, and audiovisual materials.
The Ruth Ann Musick Library at Fairmont State University	Academic Library	Marion County	The Ruth Ann Musick Library at Fairmont State University collects materials pertaining to the history of the university. The collection includes yearbooks, academic catalogs, newspapers, genealogy, and local history collections.
Mason County Public Library	Public Library	Mason County	The Mason County Public Library has the Mary Jo Cochran Local History Room, which consists of works regarding local city, county, and state history, as well as donated family histories, census data, and local cemetery information.
J. Frank Marsh Library at Concord University	Academic Library	Mercer County	The J. Frank Marsh Library collects materials relating to the history of Concord University and rare books.
Eastern Regional Coal Archives at the Craft Memorial Library	Public Library	Mercer County	The Eastern Regional Coal Archives collects and preserves the history of the coal fields, including artifacts, blueprints, company records, correspondences, diaries, films, maps, miner's tools, newspapers, oral histories, photographs, rare books, scrapbooks, and railroad memorabilia.
Mary F. Shipper Library at West Virginia University Potomac State College	Academic Library	Mineral County	The Mary F. Shipper Library collects materials related to the history of the campus and student life. Materials include alumni newspapers, campus and local high school yearbooks, West Virginia newspapers, and the Evelyn Bane Mineral County Genealogy Collection.
West Virginia Mine Wars Museum	Museums	Mingo County	The West Virginia Mine Wars Museum preserves the history of the Battle of Blair Mountain, the fight for labor justice, and the people who lived through it.
West Virginia & Regional History Center at West Virginia University	Academic Library	Monongalia County	The West Virginia & Regional History Center preserves and provides access to records that document the history and culture of West Virginia and Central Appalachia.
Museums of Oglebay Institute	Museums	Ohio County	The Museum of Oglebay Institute preserves and educates about the history of the Oglebay family, American decorative arts, and local Wheeling history.
The Reuther–Wheeling Library & Labor History Archive at Wheeling Academy of Law and Science (WALS) Foundation	Community Organization	Ohio County	The WALS Foundation Reuther-Wheeling Library & Archive houses materials related to the history of labor and union activity, both in West Virginia and more generally. The collection includes photographs, magazines, books, booklets, brochures, and memorabilia.
Archives of the Diocese of Wheeling-Charleston	Religious Institution	Ohio County	The Archives of the Diocese of Wheeling-Charleston collects and preserves materials related to the history and work of the Catholic Diocese of Wheeling-Charleston.
Paul N. Elbin Library Archive at West Liberty University	Academic Library	Ohio County	West Liberty University houses materials related to the history of the university as well as assorted special collections, including the Nelle M. Krise Rare Book Collection and the Henry Lash Historic Sheet Music Collection.
Ohio County Public Library Archives	Public Library	Ohio County	The Ohio County Public Library Archives and Special Collections Department collects and preserves unique primary source material that documents the history of Wheeling and the Upper Ohio Valley region. Archives material includes photographs, scrapbooks, personal and corporate archives, journals, letters, maps, prints, pamphlets, brochures, and advertising ephemera.
Bishop Hodges Library at Wheeling University	Academic Library	Ohio County	Wheeling University is home to materials documenting the institution's history as well as assorted historical materials on microfilm.
West Virginia University Institute of Technology Library	Academic Library	Raleigh County	The WVU Institute of Technology Library collects materials related to the history of the campus and books related to West Virginia history.
Raleigh County Public Library	Public Library	Raleigh County	The Raleigh County Public Library collects genealogical materials and local history materials. The archives contain obituaries, Beckley newspapers, the Beckley Polk City Directories, West Virginia Blue Books, state county information, and family genealogies.
Beverly Heritage Center	Community Organization	Randolph County	The Beverly Heritage Center is a historic building that houses materials that tell the story of the Battle of Rich Mountain, the First Campaign of the American Civil War, the role of Staunton-Parkersburg Turnpike, and daily life in Beverly through the 19th century.
Booth Library's Special Collections & Archives at Davis & Elkins College	Academic Library	Randolph County	The Booth Library's Special Collection & Archives collects and preserves materials form the Davis and Elkins founding families, college materials and publications, facility publications, the Jim and Ola Cornstock collection, which includes the Pearl S. Buck Collection, and books on the history of Elkins, Randolph County, and West Virginia.
Elkins Randolph County Public Library	Public Library	Randolph County	The Elkins Randolph County Public Library collects books related to local history and West Virginia.
Roane County Public Library	Public Library	Roane County	The Roane County Public Library houses genealogy materials from all over the state and the West Virginia Collection.
Roane County Historical Society	Community Organization	Roane County	The Roane County Historical Society collects and preserves genealogical records related to Roane County.
Paden City Public Library	Public Library	Tyler County	The Paden City Public Library is home to the O. O. Brown Collection of photographs, documents, and ephemera previously owned by Brown, a glassworker.
West Virginia Wesleyan College Archives and Special Collections	Academic Library	Upshur County	The West Virginia Wesleyan College Archives and Special Collections houses materials documenting the history of West Virginia Wesleyan College and materials documenting the Buckhannon and Upshur County area. Collections include photographs, manuscripts, newspapers, alumni magazines, and performance arts programs.
West Virginia United Methodist Archives at West Virginia Wesleyan College	Academic Library	Upshur County	The United Methodist Archives of the West Virginia Annual Conference, housed at West Virginia Wesleyan College, contains several collections that document the practice and traditions of West Virginia Methodism. The collation includes church files, conference journals and minutes, books, minister files, periodicals, WV Annual Conference publications, administration records, organization records, and audio-visual materials documenting many annual conference sessions.
Wyoming County Historical Museum	Museums	Wyoming County	The Wyoming County Historical Museum collects, preserves, and interprets the historic and prehistoric cultural heritage of the Wyoming County region.
Weirton Area Museum and Cultural Center	Community Organization	Brooke County	The Weirton Area Museum and Cultural Center is home to materials documenting the lived experiences of people in the Weirton area. Notable collections including the Weirton Steel Employees Bulletin collection, which consists of more than 10,000 pages of a periodical that documented the lives of steel employees and their families from 1934 until 1989, and includes articles, photographs, advertisements, local sports segments, recipes and dress patterns.
