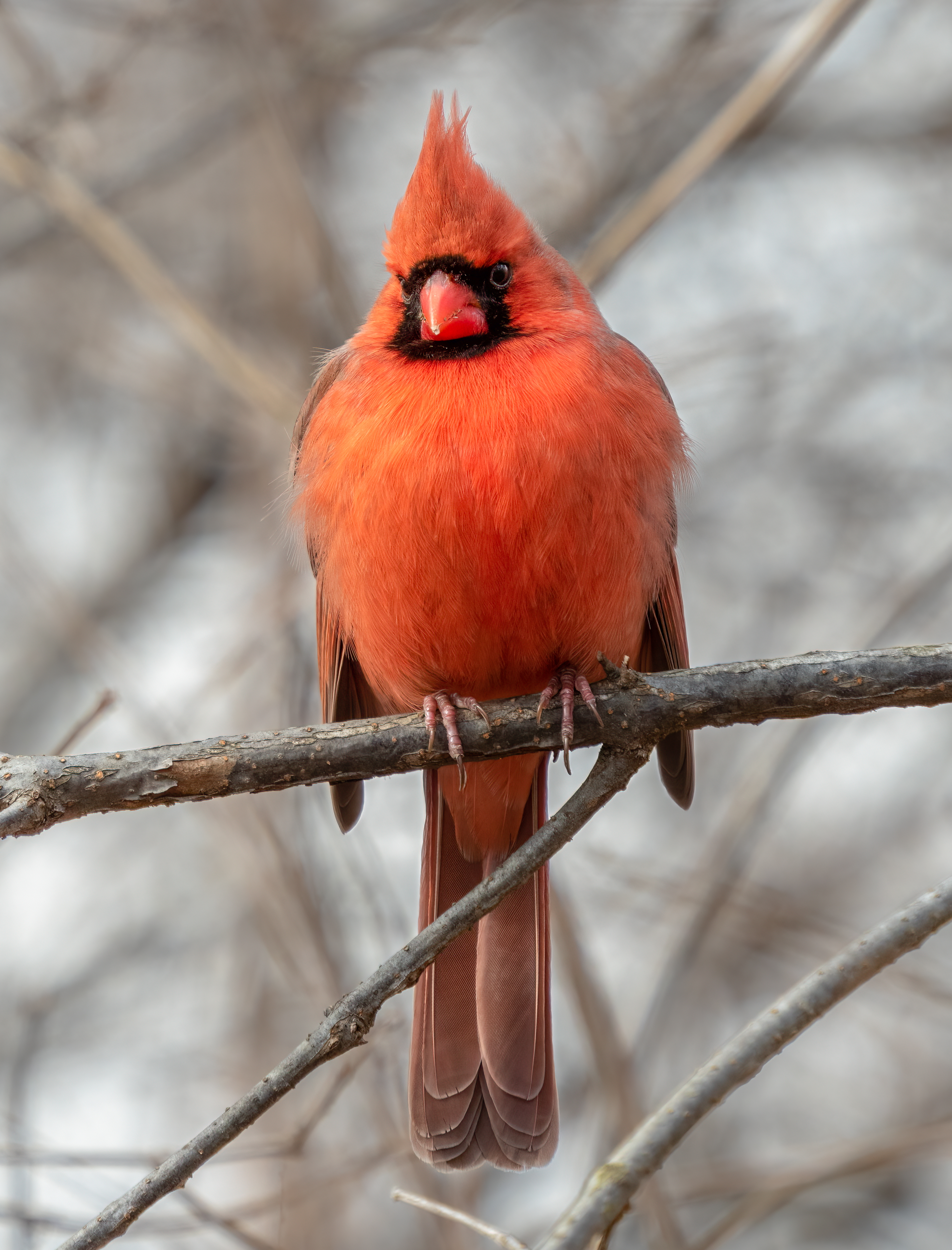
- Male in New York, United States
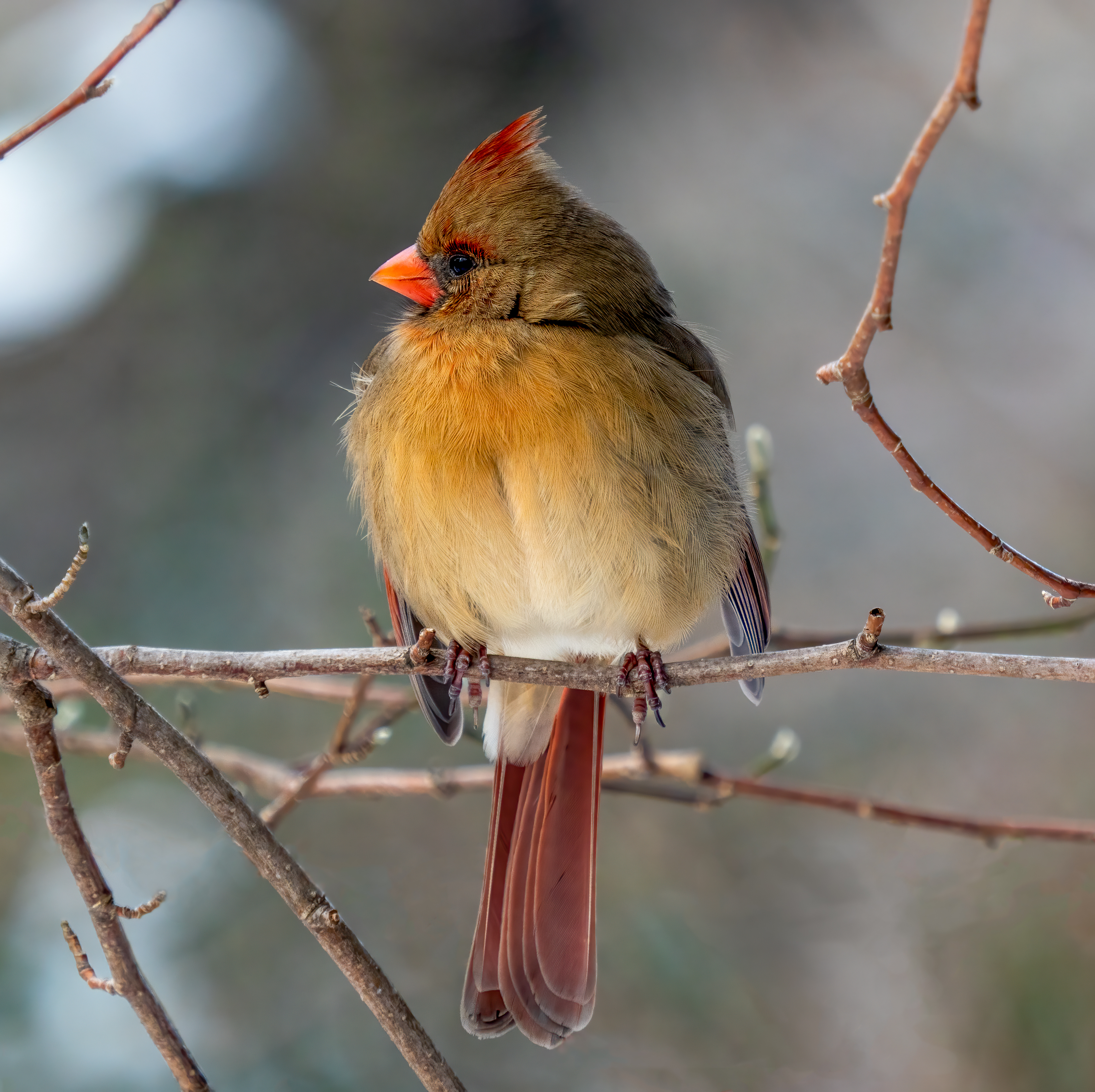
- Female in New York, United States

Conservation status
- Least Concern (IUCN 3.1)

- Secure (NatureServe)

Scientific classification
- Kingdom: Animalia
- Phylum: Chordata
- Class: Aves
- Order: Passeriformes
- Family: Cardinalidae
- Genus: Cardinalis
- Species: C. cardinalis

Binomial name
- Cardinalis cardinalis (Linnaeus, 1758)

Subspecies
- 19 subspecies, see text
- Approximate distribution map Year-round

Synonyms
- Loxia cardinalis Linnaeus, 1758

= Northern cardinal =

Northern cardinal Temporal range: Gelasian–Present

Species of North American bird

The northern cardinal (Cardinalis cardinalis), also commonly known as the common cardinal, red cardinal, or simply cardinal, is a bird in the genus Cardinalis. It can be found in southeastern Canada, through the eastern United States from Maine to Minnesota to Texas, New Mexico, southern Arizona, southern California and south through Mexico, Belize, and Guatemala. It is also an introduced species in a few locations such as Bermuda and all major islands of Hawaii since its introduction in 1929. Its habitat includes woodlands, gardens, shrublands, and wetlands. It is the state bird of Illinois, Indiana, Kentucky, North Carolina, Ohio, Virginia, and West Virginia.

The northern cardinal is a mid-sized perching songbird with a body length of 21–23 cm (8.3–9.1 in) and a crest on the top of its head. The species expresses sexual dimorphism: Females are a reddish olive color, and have a gray mask around the beak, while males are a vibrant red color, and have a black mask on the face, as well as a larger crest. Juvenile cardinals do not have the distinctive red-orange beak seen in adult birds until they are almost fully mature. On hatching, their beaks are grayish-black and they do not become the typical orange-red color until they acquire their final adult plumage in the fall.

The northern cardinal is mainly granivorous but also feeds on insects and fruit. The male behaves territorially, marking out his territory with song. During courtship, the male feeds seed to the female beak-to-beak. The northern cardinal's clutch typically contains three to four eggs, with two to four clutches produced each year. It was once prized as a pet, but its sale was banned in the United States by the Migratory Bird Treaty Act of 1918.

== Taxonomy ==
The northern cardinal was described by Carl Linnaeus in the 1758 10th edition of Systema Naturae. It was originally categorized as Loxia cardinalis, a genus which now contains only crossbills. In 1838, it was recategorized as Cardinalis virginianus. In 1918, the scientific name was sometimes replaced with Richmondena cardinalis. In 1983, the scientific name was changed again to Cardinalis cardinalis and the common name was changed to "northern cardinal" to avoid confusion with the several other species also termed cardinals.

The cardinal is named after cardinals of the Roman Catholic Church, who wear distinctive red robes and caps. The term "northern" in the common name refers to its range, as it is the northernmost cardinal species known.

== Description ==
The northern cardinal is a mid-sized songbird with a body length of 21–23.5 cm (8.3–9.3 in) and a wingspan of 25–31 cm (9.8–12.2 in). The adult weighs from 33.6–65 g (1.19–2.29 oz), with an average 44.8 g (1.58 oz). The male averages slightly larger than the female.

The oldest wild cardinal banded by researchers lived at least 15 years and 9 months, although 28.5 years was achieved by a captive bird. Annual survival rates for adult northern cardinals have been estimated at 60–65%.

=== Plumage ===
The adult male is a brilliant crimson red color with a black face mask over the eyes, extending to the upper chest. The color becomes duller and darker on the back and wings. The adult female is fawn-colored, with mostly grayish-brown tones and a slight reddish tint on the wings, crest, and tail feathers. The face mask of the female is gray to black and is less defined than that of the male. Both sexes possess prominent raised crests and bright coral-colored beaks. The beak is cone-shaped and strong. Young birds, both male and female, show coloring similar to the adult female until the fall, when they molt and grow adult feathers. They are brown above and red-brown below, with brick-colored crest, forehead, wings, and tail. The legs and feet are a dark pink-brown. The iris of the eye is brown.

The plumage color of the males is produced from carotenoid pigments in the diet. Coloration is produced from both red and yellow carotenoid pigments. Northern cardinal males metabolize carotenoid pigments to create plumage pigmentation of a color different from the ingested pigment. When fed only yellow pigments, males become a pale red color. A few rare "yellow morph" cardinals lack the enzyme to convert carotenoids into red pigments, and have a yellow beak and feathers (except for black face mask).

== Distribution and habitat ==
Northern cardinals are numerous across the eastern United States from the southern half of Maine to Minnesota to the Texas-Mexico border and in Canada in the southern portions of Ontario, Quebec, New Brunswick and Nova Scotia, all the way east to Cape Breton Island. Its range also extends south through Mexico to the Isthmus of Tehuantepec, northern Guatemala, and northern Belize. An allopatric population is found on the Pacific slope of Mexico from Jalisco to Oaxaca (this population is not shown on the range map). The species was introduced to Bermuda in 1700. It has also been introduced in Hawaii. Its natural habitat is in woodlands, gardens, shrublands, and wetlands.

In 1929, Forbush described the species as rare in New England, and by 1955 Griscom reported the bird to be "pushing northward" when recorded annually at feeding stations. Audubon data shows that the population has grown rapidly in Massachusetts since 1960. In Massachusetts, the species is most abundant in the east, especially in areas where dense cover is interspersed with open areas, such as woodland edges, brushy fields, wooded wetlands, parks, and suburban areas. They tend to avoid extensive woodlands.

== Behavior ==
During winter, cardinals will fluff up their down feathers in order to retain warm air next to their body. The down feathers are small and hairlike at the base of each flight feather. The legs and feet are thin and lack feathers, and are vulnerable to rapid heat loss. In cold temperatures, cardinals will shiver and tense their muscles, especially breast muscles, to generate heat. Cardinals have the ability to drop their body temperature 3 to 6 °F (1.7 to 3.3 °C) if needed in order to survive cold temperatures.

=== Songs ===
Both sexes sing clear, whistled song patterns, which are repeated several times, then varied. Some common phrases are described as "cheeeer-a-dote, cheeer-a-dote-dote-dote", "purdy, purdy, purdy...whoit, whoit, whoit, whoit", "what-cheer, what-cheer... wheet, wheet, wheet, wheet" and "cheer, cheer, cheer, what, what, what, what".

Northern cardinal
Song of the northern cardinal

The northern cardinal has a distinctive alarm call, a short metallic chip sound. This call often is given when predators approach the nest, in order to give warning to the female and nestlings.

The songs of the two sexes of the northern cardinal, although difficult to distinguish by the human ear, are sexually dimorphic. It is suggested that this is because of the differences in levels of hormones of the two sexes.

=== Territoriality ===
The northern cardinal is a territorial song bird. The male sings in a loud, clear whistle from the top of a tree or another high location to defend his territory. He will chase off other males entering his territory. He may mistake his image on various reflective surfaces as an invading male and will fight his reflection relentlessly. The northern cardinal learns its songs, and as a result the songs vary regionally. Mated pairs often travel together. The songs of a northern cardinal will usually overlap more in syllables when compared to other northern cardinals near it than those far away from it.

== Diet ==
The diet of the adult northern cardinal consists mainly (up to 90%) of weed seeds, grains, and fruits. It is a ground feeder and finds food while hopping on the ground through trees or shrubbery. It will also consume snails and insects, including beetles, cicadas, and grasshoppers, and the young are fed almost entirely on insects. Other common items include corn, oats, sunflower seeds, the blossoms and bark of elm trees, and drinks of maple sap from holes made by sapsuckers.

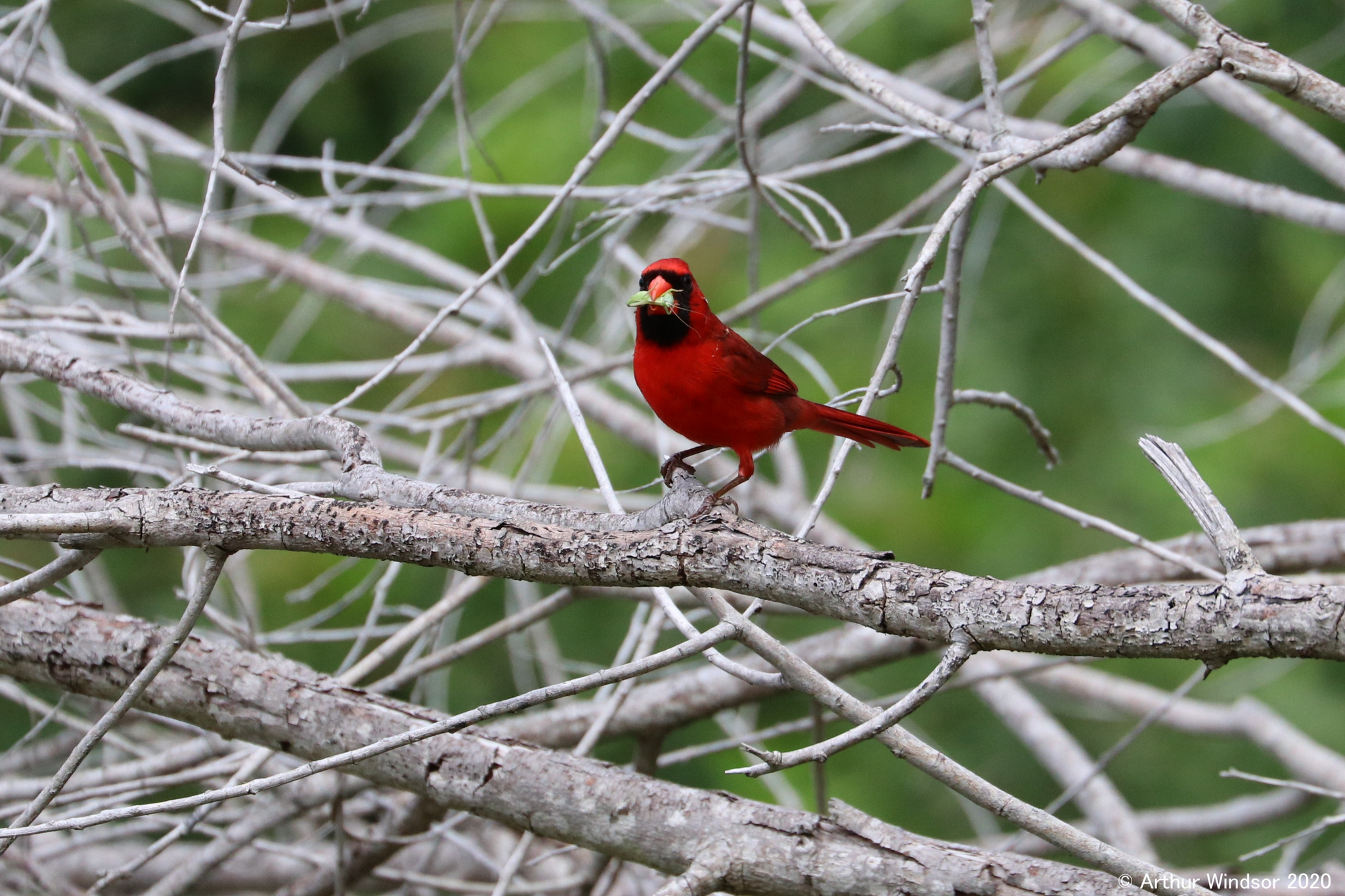
Adult male with a grasshopper

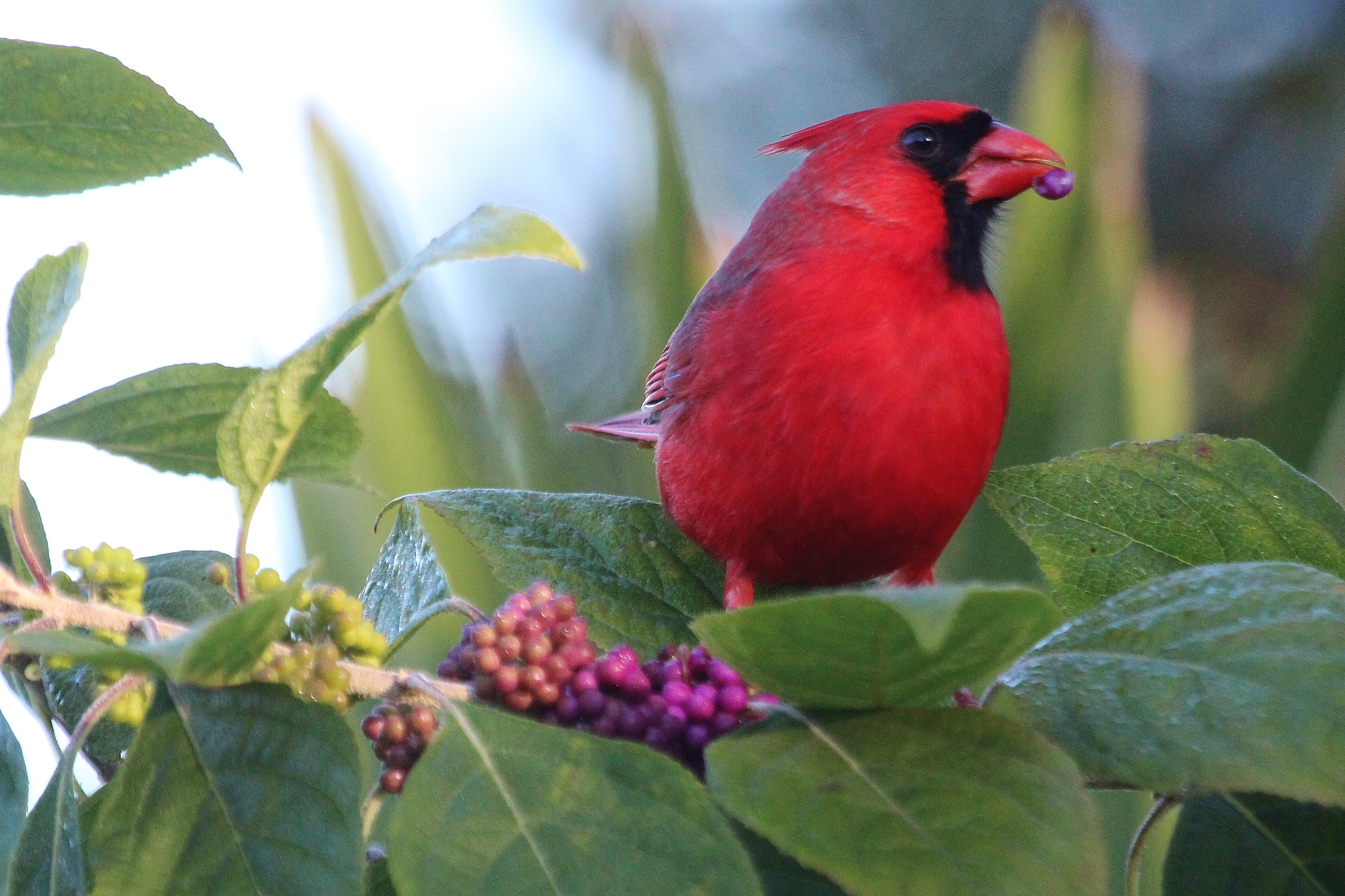
Male cardinal feeding on American beautyberry at Okeeheelee Nature Center, Florida

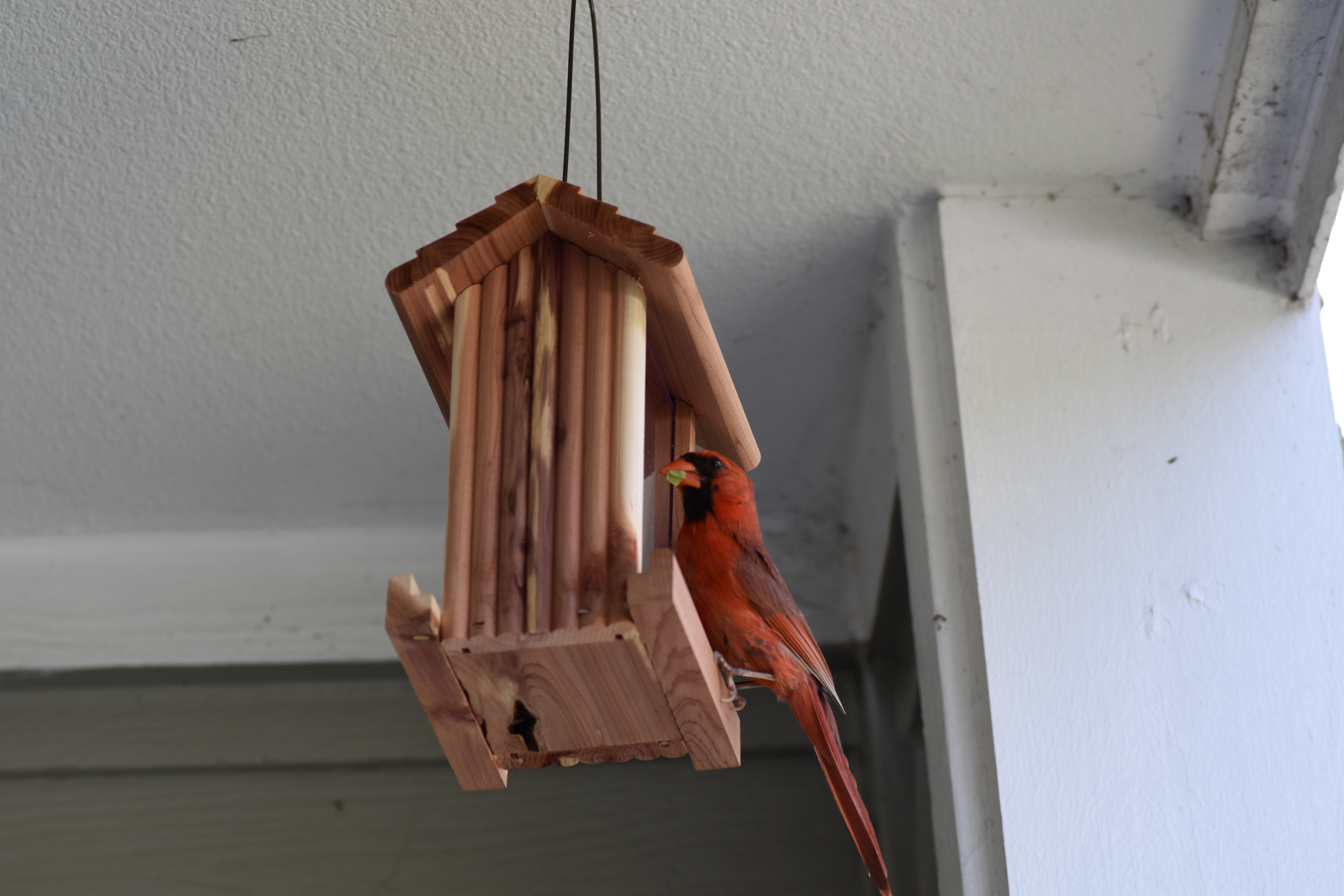
A male northern cardinal feeding on a bird feeder

== Reproduction ==
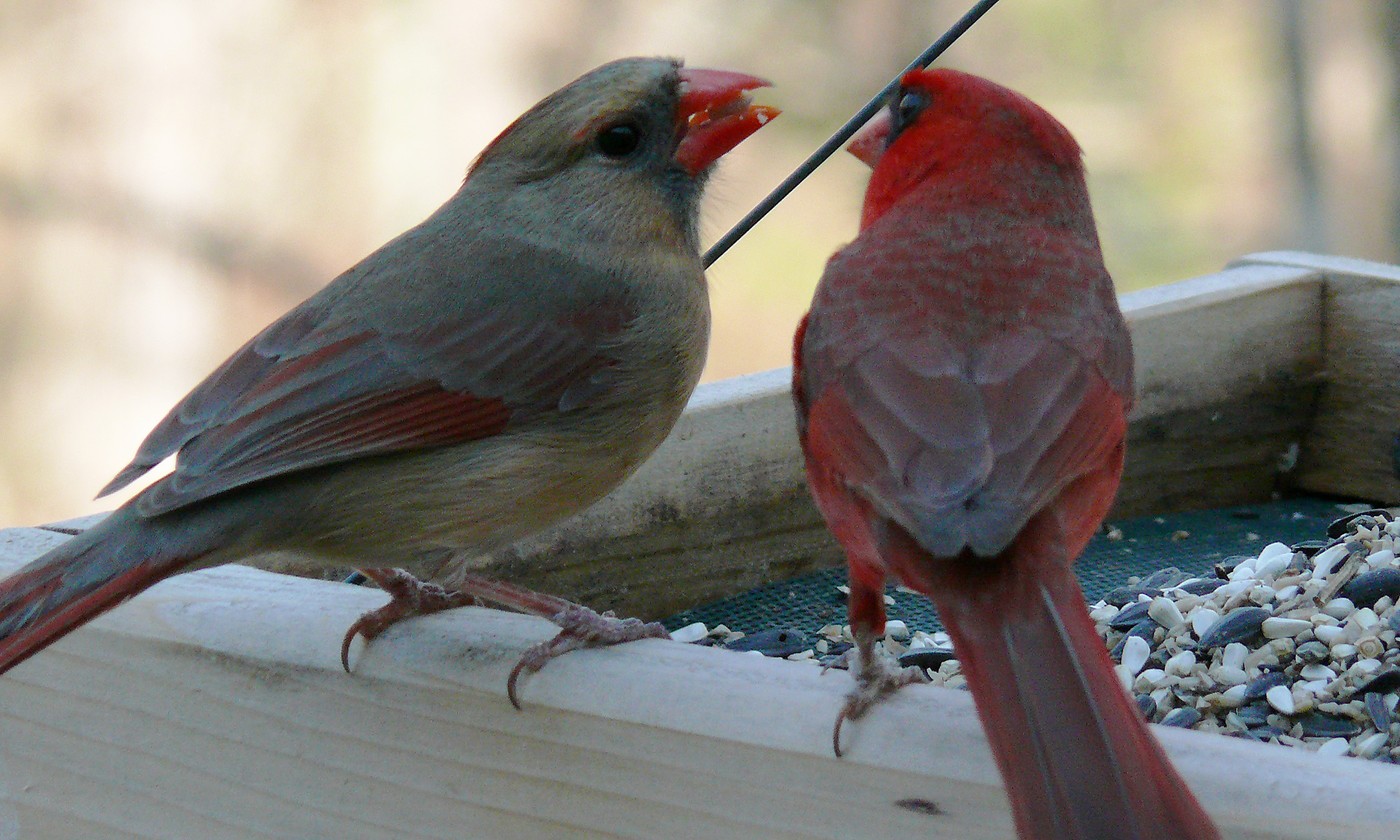
The male often feeds the female as part of their courtship behavior.

Pairs may mate for successive years, but some also "divorce" between seasons or choose a new mate when one dies. Pairs generally stay together year-round but are not necessarily monogamous. DNA studies of two populations of cardinals found that 9–35% of nestlings were not fathered by the female's mate. Mated pairs sometimes sing together before nesting. During courtship they may also participate in a bonding behavior where the male collects food and brings it to the female, feeding her beak-to-beak.

=== Nests ===
The cardinals' nest is made of thin twigs, bark strips, and grasses, lined with grasses or other plant fibers. Males sometimes bring nest material to the female, who does most of the building. The female builds a cup nest in a well-concealed spot in dense shrub or a low tree 1–3 m (3.3–9.8 ft) off the ground. She crushes twigs with her beak until they are pliable, then turns in the nest to bend the twigs around her body and push them into a cup shape with her feet. The cup has four layers: coarse twigs (and sometimes bits of trash) covered in a leafy mat, then lined with grapevine bark (when available) and finally grasses, stems, rootlets, and pine needles (where available). The nest typically takes three to nine days to build; the finished product is 5.1–7.6 cm (2.0–3.0 in) tall, 10.1 cm (4.0 in) across, with an inner diameter of about 7.6 cm (3.0 in). Cardinals do not usually use their nests more than once.

=== Eggs ===
There are usually three or four eggs per nest, though there are sometimes as few as one or as many as five. The eggs are white, with a tint of green, blue, or brown, and are marked with lavender, gray, or brown blotches which are thicker around the larger end. The shell is smooth and slightly glossy. Eggs measure approximately 26 mm × 19 mm (1.02 in × 0.75 in) in size.

Eggs are laid one to six days following the completion of the nest. Three or four eggs are laid in each clutch. The female generally incubates the eggs. The male may incubate for brief periods of time, though this is rare. Incubation takes 12 or 13 days. Young fledge 10 or 11 days after hatching. Two or three, and even four, broods are raised each year. The male cares for and feeds each brood as the female incubates the next clutch of eggs.

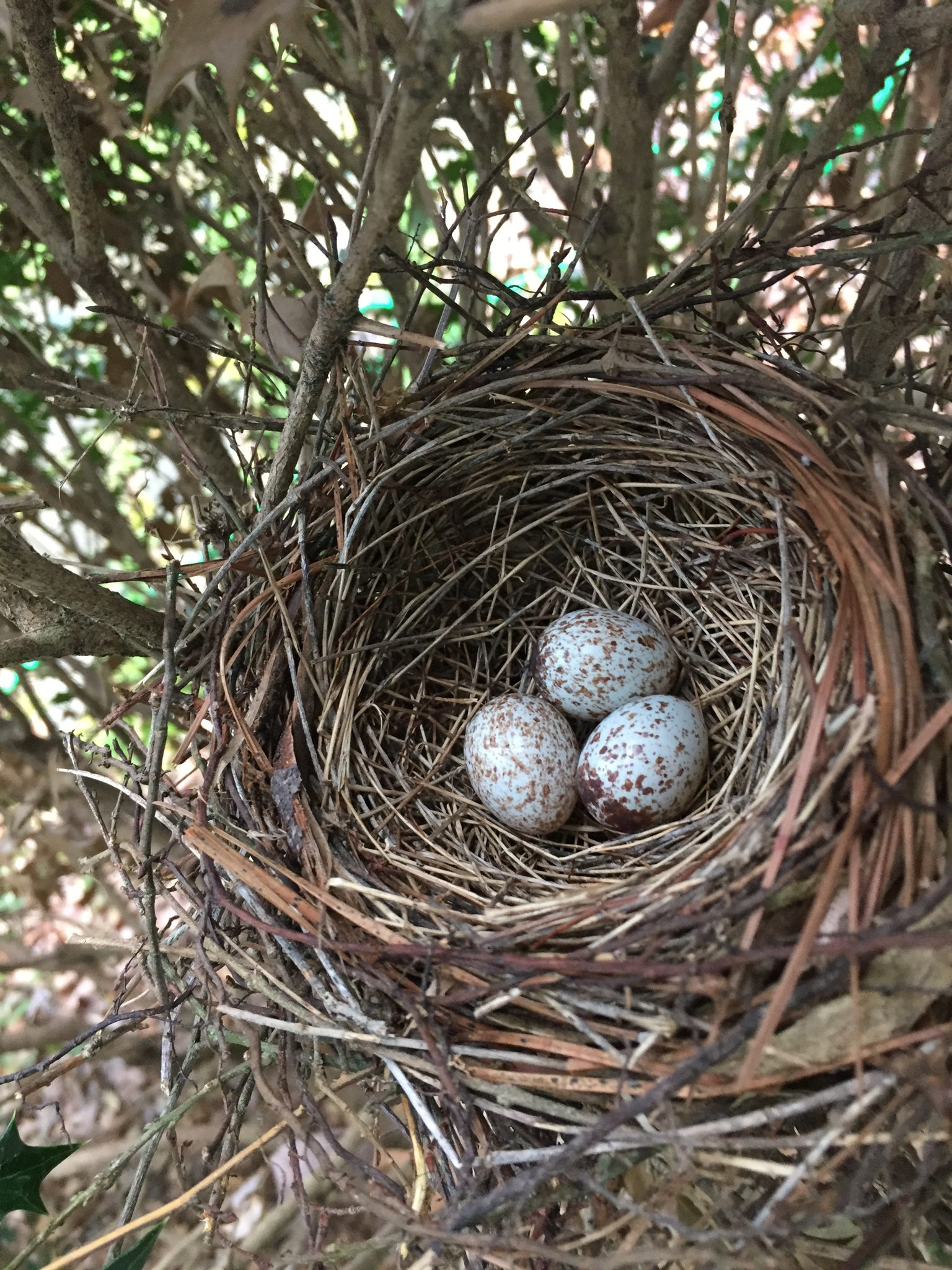
Nest with three eggs in Durham, North Carolina

Cardinals in Massachusetts have been observed to nest in thick and dense shrubs, trees, and vine tangles, making nests out of twigs, grass, and plant fibers. The eggs are usually incubated by female cardinals, who have brood patches, while the male cardinal forages for food.

=== Nestlings ===
Newly hatched cardinals weigh an average of 3–3.5 grams, are naked, blind, and immobile, and do not have feathers until they are 4–5 days old. Unlike adults, their diet is mainly composed of insects, which adults crush with their beaks and feed to them. They gain weight at a rate of about 2–3 grams per day, but grow a bit slower until day 2, faster from day 2 to day 7 or 8, and then slower for the day or two before fledging.

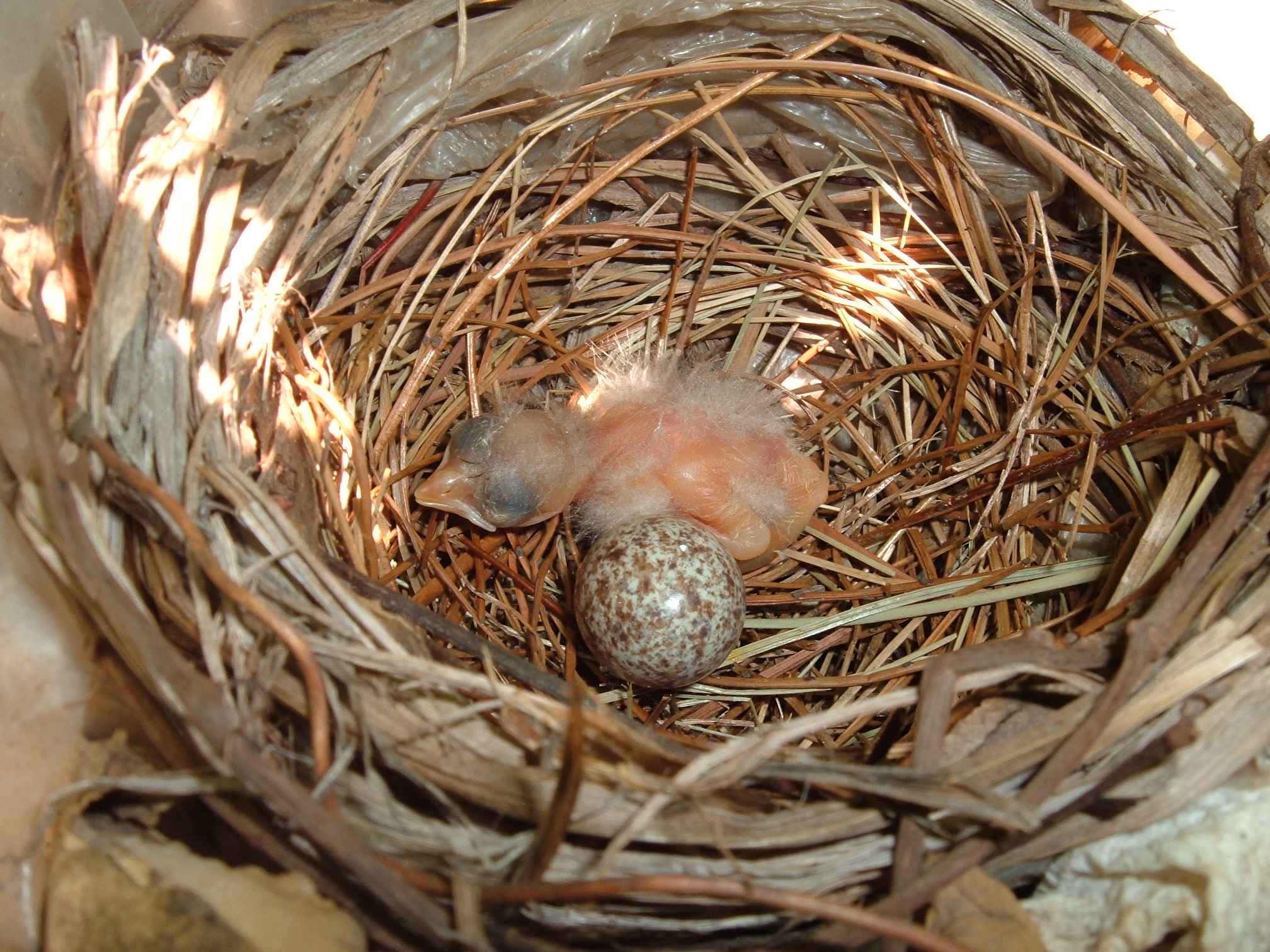
Newly hatched

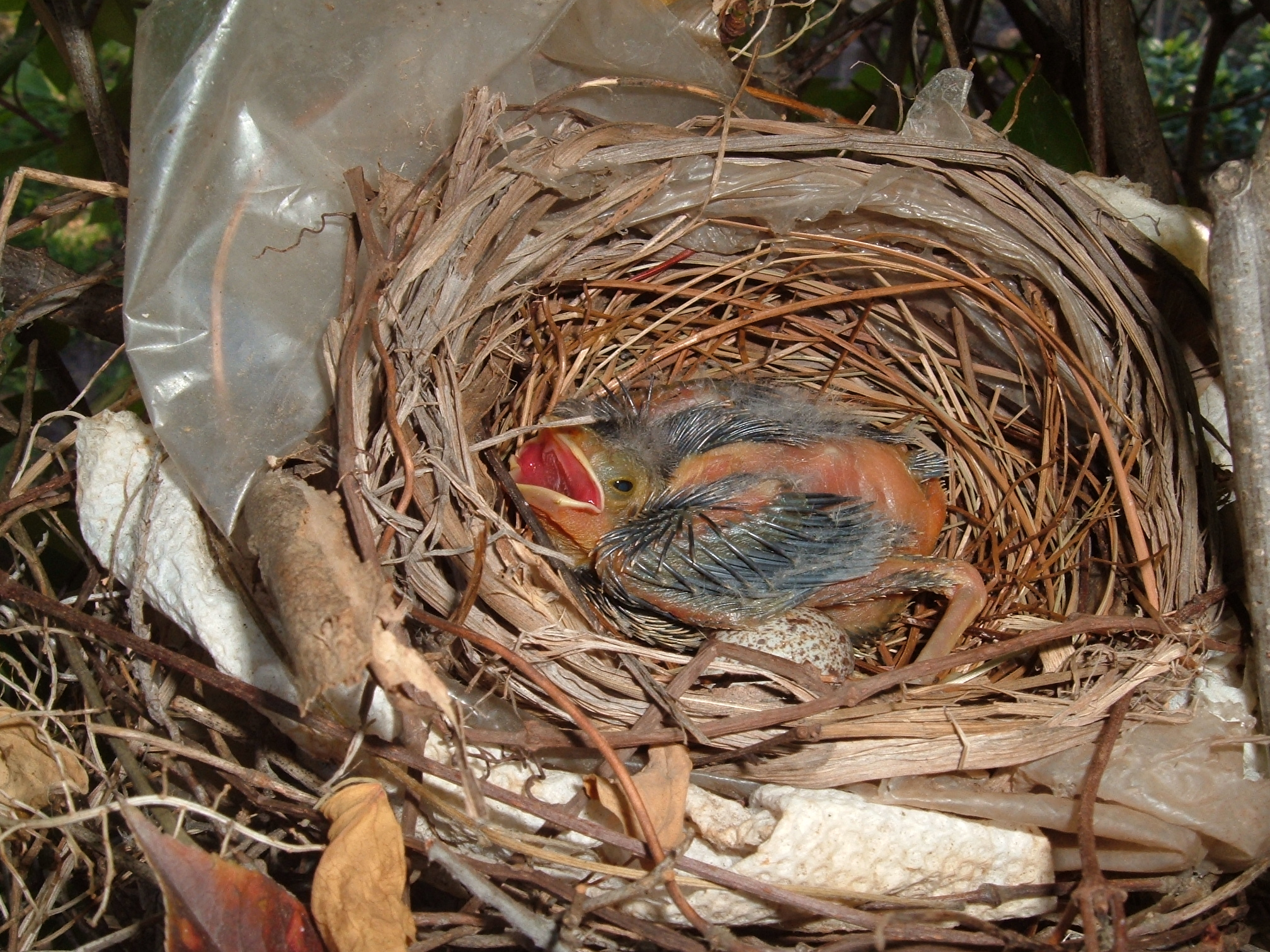
At one week of age

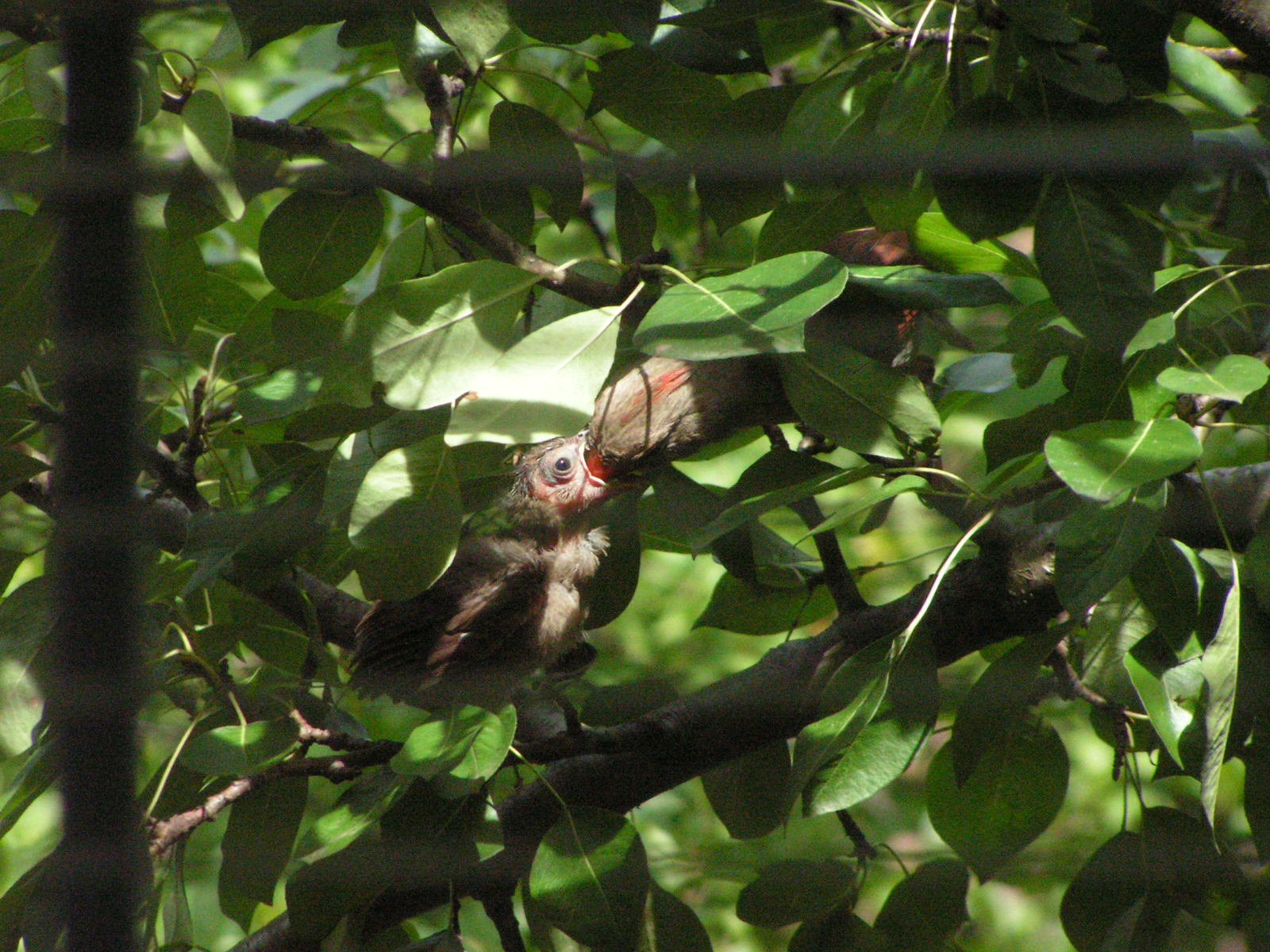
Female feeding a chick

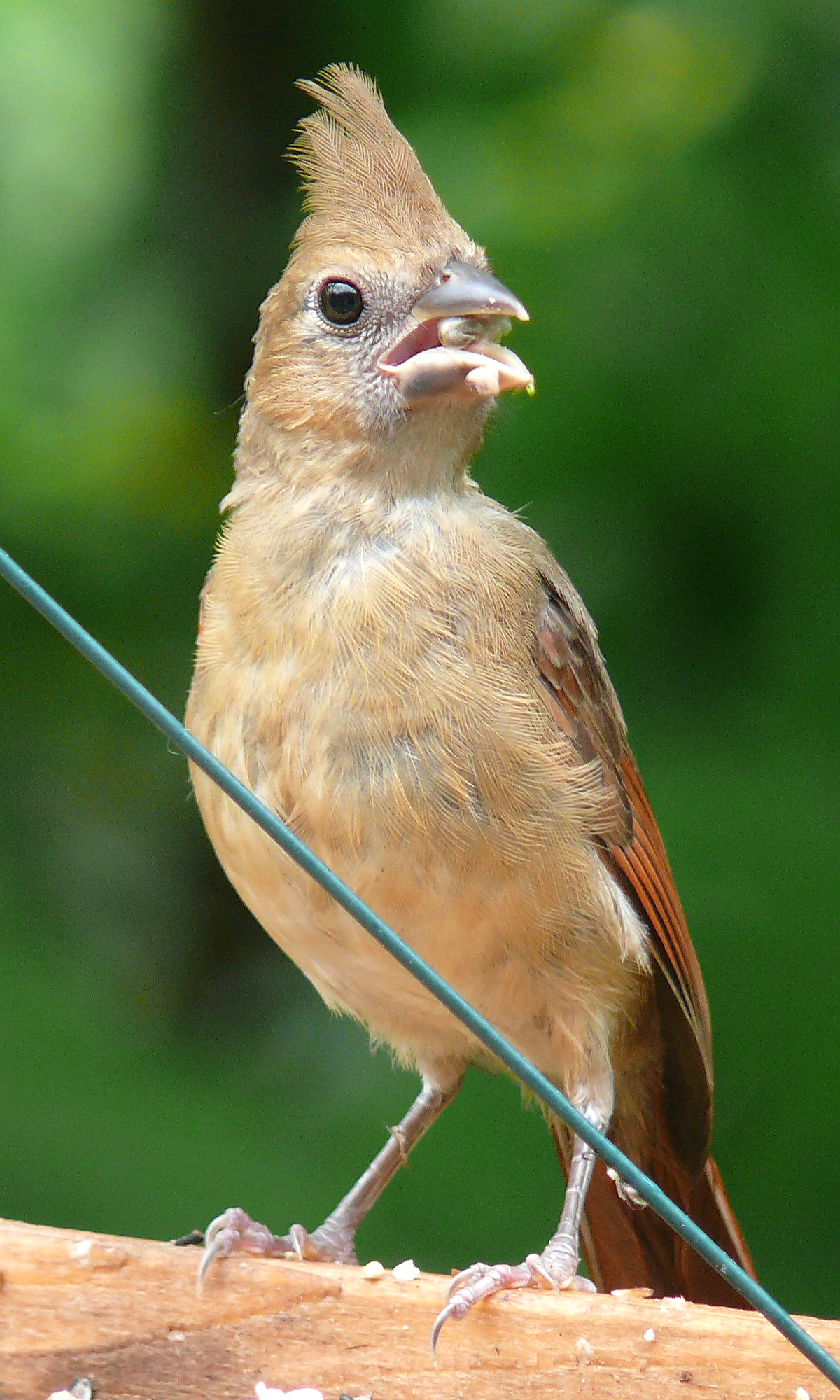
Fledgling at a box feeder

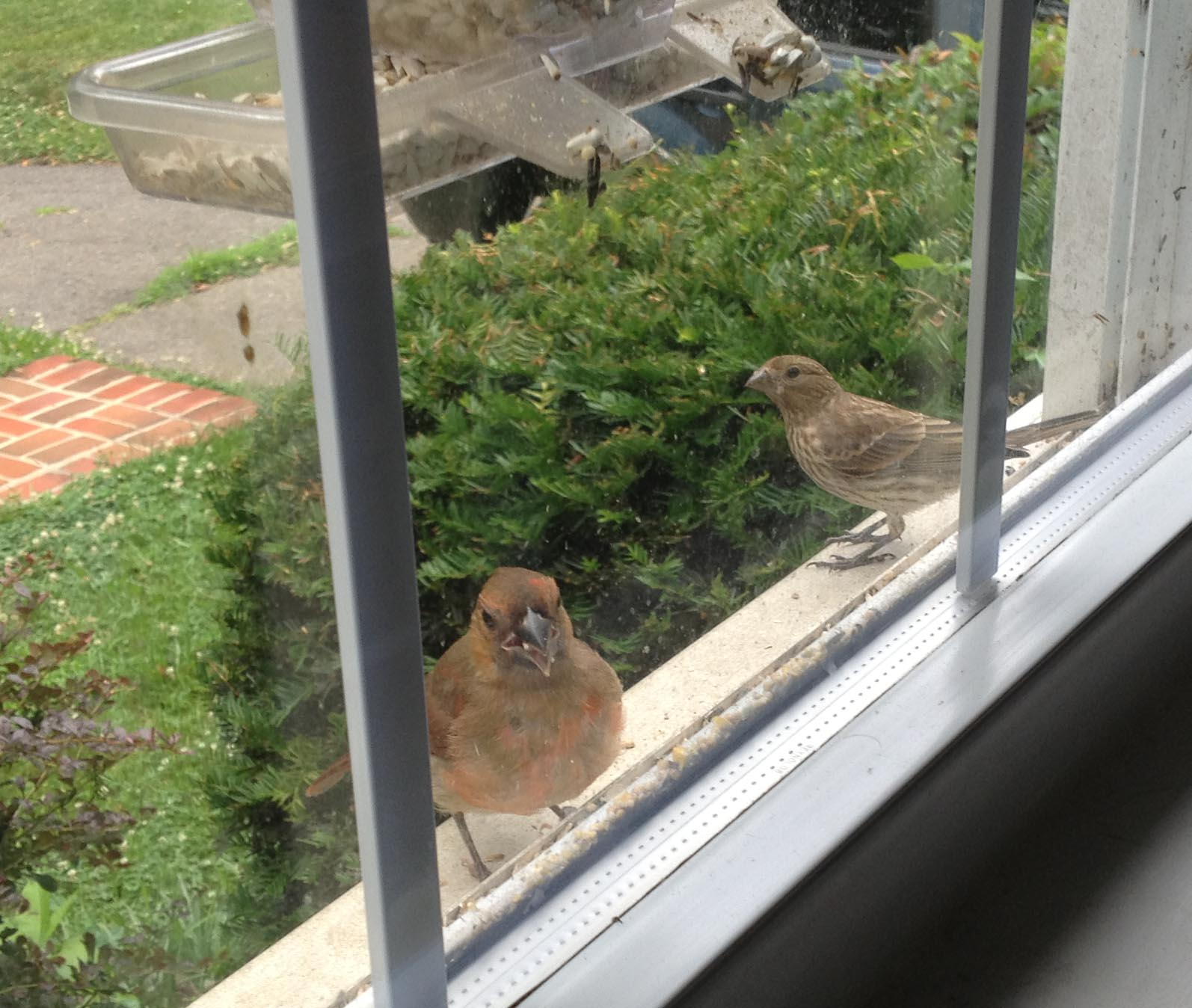
Juvenile male northern cardinal (left) at feeder with female house finch

Male juvenile in Manhasset, New York

Female juvenile in Manhasset

=== Vocalizations ===
Call of the northern cardinal

Nestlings vocalize to attract parents for feeding. Very young nestlings will beg if the nest is moved, but as they grow older, they start to only respond to their parents' presence or their songs.

=== Defecation ===
Nestlings defecate in the form of a fecal sac, where the fecal matter is enclosed by a tough mucous membrane. They are produced every 3 or 4 feedings, and female cardinals sometimes stimulate defecation by poking the nestling near the cloaca. Fecal sacs from the first 4 to 5 days of nesting are eaten by the parents, and later sacs are carried away from the nest and dropped.

== Ecology ==
Northern cardinals are preyed upon by a wide variety of predators native to North America, including falcons, all Accipiter hawks, shrikes, bald eagles, golden eagles and several owls, including long-eared owls, and eastern screech owls. Predators of chicks and eggs include milk snakes, coluber constrictors, blue jays, crows, eastern gray squirrels, fox squirrels, eastern chipmunks, and domestic cats.

Cowbirds have been observed to parasitize their nests.

== Relationship with humans ==
In Cherokee mythology, the cardinal is associated with the sun and is a symbol of good luck.

The northern cardinal is found in residential areas throughout its range. Bird feeders attract it by using feeders containing seeds, particularly sunflower seeds and safflower seeds. An increase in backyard feeding by humans has increased the range of this species, with an estimated global range of 5,800,000 km^{2} (2,200,000 sq mi) and a global population of some 100 million. Populations appear to remain stable or increasing.

Cardinals were once prized as pets due to their bright color and distinctive song. In the United States, this species is protected under the Migratory Bird Treaty Act of 1918, which also banned their sale as cage birds. It is illegal to take, kill, or possess northern cardinals, and violation of the law is punishable by a fine of up to US$15,000 and imprisonment of up to six months. It is also protected by the Convention for the Protection of Migratory Birds in Canada.

A study conducted in 2016 in Atlanta, Georgia, on West Nile virus transmission in the United States found that unlike other species, northern cardinals biologically suppress the disease upon infection.

=== Mascot ===
In the United States, the northern cardinal (referred to as just "cardinal") is the mascot of numerous athletic teams; however, most teams portray the bird with a yellow beak and legs. In professional sports, it is the mascot of the St. Louis Cardinals of Major League Baseball's National League and the Arizona Cardinals of the National Football League, which for many years were also based in St. Louis. In college athletics, it is the mascot of many schools, including Ball State University, The Catholic University of America, Illinois State University, the University of the Incarnate Word, Lamar University, the University of Louisville, the Massachusetts College of Pharmacy and Health Sciences, North Central College, North Idaho College, Otterbein University, Saint John Fisher College, the State University of New York at Plattsburgh, Wesleyan University, Wheeling University, and William Jewell College.

=== U.S. state bird ===
The northern cardinal is the state bird of seven U.S. states, more than any other species: Illinois, Indiana, Kentucky, North Carolina, Ohio, Virginia, and West Virginia; although in each case the particular state just refers to the bird as "cardinal". It was also a candidate to become the state bird of Delaware but lost to the Delaware Blue Hen. Because the cardinal is the state bird of the six states along its route, the Amtrak passenger train between Chicago and Washington DC bears the name of the bird as well.

== Subspecies ==
There are 19 subspecies:

- C. c. cardinalis (Linnaeus, 1758)
- C. c. affinis Nelson, 1899
- C. c. canicaudus Chapman, 1891
- C. c. carneus (Lesson, 1842)
- C. c. clintoni (Banks, 1963)
- C. c. coccineus Ridgway, 1873
- C. c. flammiger J.L. Peters, 1913
- C. c. floridanus Ridgway, 1896
- C. c. igneus S.F. Baird, 1860
- C. c. littoralis Nelson, 1897
- C. c. magnirostris Bangs, 1903
- C. c. mariae Nelson, 1898
- C. c. phillipsi Parkes, 1997
- C. c. saturatus Ridgway, 1885
- C. c. seftoni (Huey, 1940)
- C. c. sinaloensis Nelson, 1899
- C. c. superbus Ridgway, 1885
- C. c. townsendi (van Rossem, 1932)
- C. c. yucatanicus Ridgway, 1887
