= West Virginia Healthy Lifestyles Act of 2005 =

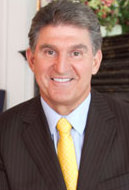
Joe Manchin (D), then governor of West Virginia

The West Virginia Healthy Lifestyles Act of 2005 is a West Virginia state law enacted in 2005. Signed into law by Governor Joe Manchin III, the act's purpose was to address obesity in the state. The state legislature found in 2005 that "obesity is a problem of epidemic proportions" in West Virginia.

== Provisions ==
Introduced as House Bill 2816, the West Virginia Health Lifestyles Act consists of five school-based mandates which require health education assessments, fitness assessments, physical education, body mass index (BMI) assessments and the availability of healthy beverages in schools.

The law restricts elementary schools, middle schools, and junior high schools from selling soft drinks in areas accessible to students during the school day. High schools are allowed to sell soft drinks in vending machines during the school day only if they also offer healthy drink options as well and only if at least fifty percent of the drinks available are considered to be healthy. The law recognizes healthy drinks as water, low-fat milk, juices made one hundred percent from fruits and vegetables, and other juice drinks with a minimum of twenty percent real juice. This portion of the law states that, "Seventy-five percent of the profits from the sale of healthy beverages and soft drinks shall be allocated by a majority vote of the faculty senate of each school and twenty-five percent of the profits from the sale of healthy beverages and soft drinks shall be allocated to the purchase of necessary supplies by the principal of the school."

In addition to the school-based mandates, the act created the Office of Healthy Lifestyles within the West Virginia Department of Health and Human Resources, a partnership to encourage healthy lifestyles by children and families in the state, and an interest bearing account known as the Healthy Lifestyles Fund.

== Implementation and funding ==
The policy's school-based elements were implemented beginning in 2006. The state has received funding to evaluate the legislation and its impact from the Robert Wood Johnson Foundation, a national philanthropy organization dedicating to improving health care in the United States.

Carole Harris, professor of Behavioral Medicine and Psychiatry at the West Virginia University, conducted research that evaluated the West Virginia Healthy Lifestyles Act and the West Virginia Board of Education’s school nutrition standards. Dr. Harris noted that participation by students and schools in health education and fitness testing had improved, but approximately 40 percent of schools are unable to meet one or more of the five mandates in the act: "The combination of these policies for nutrition and physical activity make West Virginia one of the most progressive states in the country when it comes to addressing childhood obesity and related issues. But some schools continue to struggle to provide the mandated physical education because of inadequate staffing, facilities, or both."
