= List of West Virginia state symbols =

The following is a list of symbols of the U.S. state of West Virginia.

== Insignia ==
Type	Symbol	Year	Image
Coat of arms	The Coat of Arms of West Virginia	1863	The Coat of Arms of West Virginia
Flag	The flag of West Virginia consists of the coat of arms, wreathed below in rhododendron and bannered with "State of West Virginia" above, on a white field bound in blue	1929	Flag of West Virginia
Motto	Montani Semper Liberi (Mountaineers [are] Always Free)	1863, 1872	
Seal	The Great Seal of the State of West Virginia	1863	The Great Seal of West Virginia

== Flora and fauna ==
Type	Symbol	Year	Image
Animal	Black bear	1954, 1973	Black bear
Bird	Cardinal	1949	Cardinal
Butterfly	Monarch butterfly	1995	Monarch butterfly
Fish	Brook trout	1973	Brook trout
Flower	Rhododendron	1903	Rhododendron
Fruit	Apple	1972	Golden Delicious apple
Fruit	Golden Delicious apple	1995	Golden Delicious apple
Insect	Honey bee	2002	Honey bee
Reptile	Timber rattlesnake	2008	Timber rattlesnake
Tree	Sugar maple	1949	Sugar maple

== Inanimate ==
Type	Symbol	Year	Image
Fossil	Jefferson's ground sloth (Megalonyx jeffersonii)	2008	Lithostrotionella
Gem	Silicified Mississippian Lithostrotionella coral	1990	Lithostrotionella
Rock	Bituminous coal	2009	Coal
Soil	Monongahela	1997	

== Cultural ==
Type	Symbol	Year	Image
Colors	Old gold and blue	1963	
Official holiday	West Virginia Day – June 20	1927	
Official songs	"Take Me Home, Country Roads", "The West Virginia Hills," "West Virginia, My Home Sweet Home" and "This Is My West Virginia"	1971, 1963, 2014	
Steam Locomotive	Cass Scenic Railroad #5	2004	Cass Scenic 5
Tartan	West Virginia Shawl (adaptation)	2008	
State Firearm	Harpers Ferry M1819 Hall Rifle	2013	State rifle of West Virginia
