= Transportation in West Virginia =

Transport in the U.S. state of West Virginia is handled by the West Virginia Department of Transportation (WVDOT) which employs more than 6,000 in West Virginia.

Transportation in West Virginia includes the following.

== Roads ==
=== Interstate highways ===
- Interstate 64
- Interstate 68
- Interstate 70
- Interstate 470
- Interstate 73 (proposed)
- Interstate 74 (proposed)
- Interstate 77
- West Virginia Turnpike
- Interstate 79
- Interstate 81

=== U.S. Highways ===
- U.S. Route 11
- U.S. Route 19
- U.S. Route 119
- U.S. Route 219
- U.S. Route 220
- U.S. Route 21
- U.S. Route 121
- U.S. Route 22
- U.S. Route 522
- U.S. Route 30
- U.S. Route 33
- U.S. Route 35
- U.S. Route 40
- U.S. Route 340
- U.S. Route 48
- U.S. Route 50
- U.S. Route 250
- U.S. Route 52
- U.S. Route 60
- Midland Trail
- U.S. Route 460

== Airports ==
- Appalachian Regional Airport
- Eastern West Virginia Regional Airport
- Elkins-Randolph County Airport
- Greater Cumberland Regional Airport
- Greenbrier Valley Airport
- Mercer County Airport
- Mid-Ohio Valley Regional Airport
- Morgantown Municipal Airport
- North Central West Virginia Airport
- Potomac Airfield
- Raleigh County Memorial Airport
- Tri-State Airport
- Wheeling Ohio County Airport
- Yeager Airport

== Railroads ==
While West Virginia was once crisscrossed with commercial and passenger railroad networks, the decline of the coal and timber industries, coupled with the rise of the automobile, led to a sharp drop in track mileage in the state. Many of the former railroad grades are used as trails for hiking and biking throughout the state's numerous woodlands.

Today, West Virginia is serviced by two Amtrak lines: one that cuts through the southern portion of the state, including stops in Huntington and Charleston, and one that cuts through the state's Eastern Panhandle, including stops in Martinsburg and Harpers Ferry. The Eastern Panhandle is also serviced during the week by MARC's Brunswick commuter rail line, which terminates in Martinsburg. Commercial railroads still operate in the state, mainly hauling coal to inland ports such as Huntington-Tristate (the nation's largest inland port) and Pittsburgh.

== Bridges and tunnels ==
As a mountainous state, bridges and tunnels play an important role in transportation in West Virginia. Notable bridges and tunnels include:

- New River Gorge Bridge – near Fayetteville, WV
- Silver Bridge – Point Pleasant, WV
- Silver Memorial Bridge – Henderson, WV to Gallipolis, OH
- Wheeling Suspension Bridge – Wheeling, WV
- East River Mountain Tunnel – near Bluefield, WV to near Rocky Gap, VA
- Fort Henry Bridge – Wheeling, WV
- Veterans Memorial Bridge – Weirton, WV to Steubenville, OH

== Public transportation ==
=== Rapid transit ===
- Morgantown Personal Rapid Transit

=== Bus systems ===
- Ashland Bus System
- Barons Bus Lines
- Bluefield Area Transit
- Central West Virginia Transportation Authority
- Eastern Panhandle Transit Authority
- Fairmont Marion County Transit Authority
- Intelligent Transit
- Kanawha Valley Regional Transportation Authority
- Mountain Line Transit Authority
- Ohio Valley and Eastern Ohio Regional Transportation Authority
- Tri-State Transit Authority

== Rivers ==
Rivers with commercial barge traffic and docks in West Virginia include:

- Ohio
- Kanawha (a tributary of the Ohio)
- Monongahela (The Mon and the Allegheny Rivers meet to form the Ohio in Pittsburgh, Pennsylvania.)
- Little Kanawha (a tributary of the Ohio)
- Big Sandy (a tributary of the Ohio)
- Elk (a tributary of the Kanawha)
- Pocatalico (a tributary of the Kanawha)
- Mill Creek (a tributary of the Ohio)

Navigation locks and dams in West Virginia:

- On the Ohio
  - New Cumberland Locks and Dam
  - Pike Island Locks and Dam
  - Hannibal Locks and Dam
  - Willow Island Locks and Dam
  - Belleville Locks and Dam
  - Racine Locks and Dam
  - Robert C. Byrd Locks and Dam

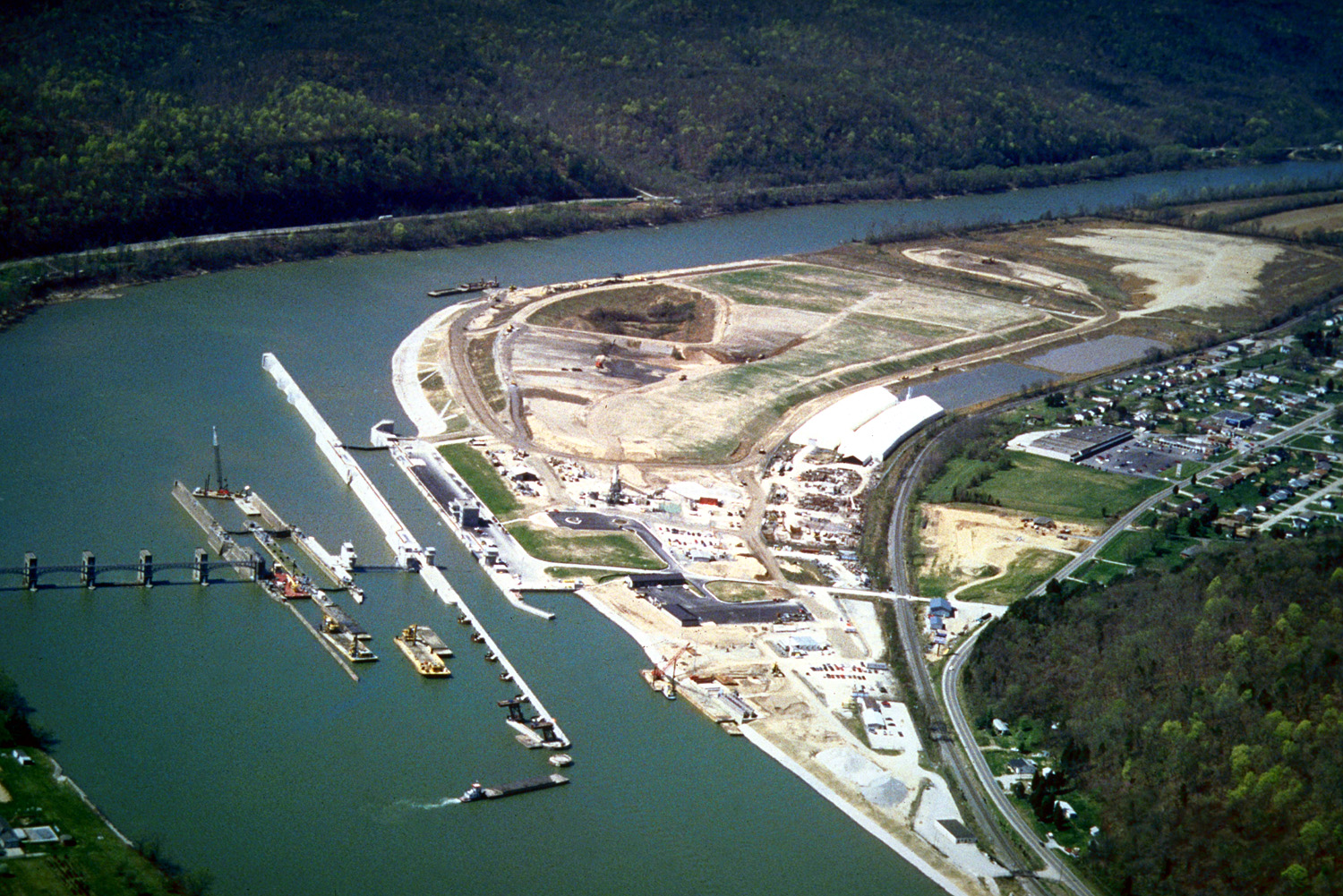
Winfield Lock and Dam on the Kanawha River at Winfield, West Virginia

- On the Kanawha
  - London Lock and Dam
  - Marmet Lock and Dam
  - Winfield Lock and Dam
- On the Monogahela
  - Morgantown Lock and Dam
  - Hildebrand Lock and Dam
  - Opekiska Lock and Dam

== See also ==
- Plug-in electric vehicles in West Virginia
- Transportation, Remuneration, Incentive Program
