= State Transit Authority (disambiguation) =

State Transit Authority may refer to:

- State Transit Authority, New South Wales, Australia
- Tri-State Transit Authority, city bus system in Huntington, West Virginia, and Ironton, Ohio

== See also ==
- State Transport Authority (disambiguation)
- Urban Transit Authority
