= Logan Airport (disambiguation) =

Logan International Airport is an airport serving Boston, Massachusetts, United States.

Logan Airport may also refer to:

- Billings Logan International Airport serving Billings, Montana, United States
- Logan County Airport (Illinois) in Lincoln, Illinois, United States (FAA: AAA)
- Logan County Airport (West Virginia) in Logan, West Virginia, United States (FAA: 6L4)
- Logan-Cache Airport, serving Logan, Utah, United States
- Russellville-Logan County Airport in Russellville, Kentucky, United States (FAA: 4M7)

== See also ==
- Logan Field (disambiguation)
