= List of airports in West Virginia =

This is a list of airports in West Virginia (a U.S. state), grouped by type and sorted by location. It contains all public-use and military airports in the state. Some private-use and former airports may be included where notable, such as airports that were previously public-use, those with commercial enplanements recorded by the FAA or airports assigned an IATA airport code.

== Airports ==
This list contains the following information:

- **City served** – The city generally associated with the airport, as per the airport's master record with the Federal Aviation Administration. This is not always the actual location since some airports are located in smaller towns outside of the city they serve. It is not meant to be a complete list of cities served, which can be found in or added to each airport's Wikipedia article.
- **FAA** – The location identifier assigned by the Federal Aviation Administration (FAA).
- **IATA** – The airport code assigned by the International Air Transport Association (IATA). Those that do not match the FAA code are shown in bold.
- **ICAO** – The location indicator assigned by the International Civil Aviation Organization (ICAO).
- **Airport name** – The official airport name. Those shown in **bold** indicate the airport has scheduled passenger service on commercial airlines.
- **Role** – One of four FAA airport categories, as per the 2021-2025 National Plan of Integrated Airport Systems (NPIAS) report released September 2020:
  - P-s: Commercial service – primary are publicly owned airports that receive scheduled passenger service and have more than 10,000 passenger boardings (enplanements) each year. Each primary airport is sub-classified by the FAA as one of the following four "hub" types (s):
    - L: Large hub that accounts for at least 1% of total U.S. passenger enplanements.
    - M: Medium hub that accounts for between 0.25% and 1% of total U.S. passenger enplanements.
    - S: Small hub that accounts for between 0.05% and 0.25% of total U.S. passenger enplanements.
    - N: Nonhub that accounts for less than 0.05% of total U.S. passenger enplanements, but more than 10,000 annual enplanements.
  - CS: Commercial service – nonprimary are publicly owned airports that receive scheduled passenger service and have at least 2,500 passenger boardings each year.
  - R: Reliever airports are designated by the FAA to relieve congestion at a large commercial service airport and to provide more general aviation access to the overall community.
  - GA: General aviation airports are the largest single group of airports in the U.S. airport system. They are public-use airports that do not have scheduled service or have scheduled service with less than 2,500 passenger boardings each year.
- **Enplanements** – The number of enplanements (commercial passenger boardings) that occurred at the airport in calendar year 2025, as per FAA records released September 2026.

City served	FAA	IATA	ICAO	Airport name	Role	Enplanements (2025)
				**Commercial service – primary airports**		
Charleston	CRW	CRW	KCRW	**Yeager Airport**	P-N	220,015
Clarksburg	CKB	CKB	KCKB	**North Central West Virginia Airport** (was Harrison-Marion Regional)	P-N	41,067
Huntington	HTS	HTS	KHTS	**Tri-State Airport** (Milton J. Ferguson Field)	P-N	110,174
Morgantown	MGW	MGW	KMGW	**Morgantown Municipal Airport** (Walter L. Bill Hart Field)	P-N	15,288
				**Commercial service – nonprimary airports**		
Beckley	BKW	BKW	KBKW	**Raleigh County Memorial Airport**	CS	6,300
Lewisburg	LWB	LWB	KLWB	**Greenbrier Valley Airport**	CS	8,989
Parkersburg	PKB	PKB	KPKB	**Mid-Ohio Valley Regional Airport**	CS	5,257
				**Reliever airports**		
				**General aviation airports**		
Bluefield	BLF	BLF	KBLF	Mercer County Airport	GA	7
Buckhannon	W22			Upshur County Regional Airport	GA	0
Elkins	EKN	EKN	KEKN	Elkins-Randolph County Airport (Jennings Randolph Field)	GA	3
Fairmont	4G7			Fairmont Municipal Airport (Frankman Field)	GA	0
Logan	6L4			Logan County Airport	GA	0
Martinsburg	MRB	MRB	KMRB	Eastern West Virginia Regional Airport	GA	11
Moundsville	MPG		KMPG	Marshall County Airport	GA	0
Petersburg	W99	PGC		Grant County Airport	GA	0
Philippi	79D			Philippi/Barbour County Regional Airport	GA	0
Pineville	I16			Wyoming County Airport (Kee Field)	GA	0
Point Pleasant	3I2			Mason County Airport	GA	0
Ravenswood	I18			Jackson County Airport	GA	0
Summersville	SXL		KSXL	Summersville Airport (Gerald L. Rader Field)	GA	0
Sutton	48I			Braxton County Airport	GA	0
Wheeling	HLG	HLG	KHLG	Wheeling Ohio County Airport	GA	9
Williamson	EBD		KEBD	Southern West Virginia Regional Airport	GA	0
				**Other public-use airports** (not listed in NPIAS)		
Arthurdale	70D			Titus Field		
Berkeley Springs	W35			Potomac Airpark		
Huntington	I41			Robert Newlon Field		
Leon	W07			Leon Airport		
Milton	12V			Ona Airpark		
New Cumberland	7G1			Herron Airport		
New Martinsville	75D			P.W. Johnson Memorial Airport		
Philippi	9W3			Simpson Airport		
Richwood	3I4			Richwood Municipal Airport		
Shinnston	6W0			Wade F. Maley Field		
Spencer	USW		KUSW	Boggs Field (formerly FAA: 14P)		
Welch	I25			Welch Municipal Airport		
Wiley Ford / Cumberland, MD	CBE	CBE	KCBE	Greater Cumberland Regional Airport (Note: Greater Cumberland Regional Airport is located in West Virginia, but the FAA considers this airport as serving the nearby larger city of Cumberland, Maryland.)		
				**Other military airports**		
Kingwood	3G5			Dawson Army Airfield (at Camp Dawson)		
				**Notable private-use airports**		
Glendale	WV66	GWV		Glendale Fokker Field		
Pence Springs	WV77			Hinton-Alderson Airport		
Weston	WV23			Louis Bennett Field (formerly public-use, FAA: 49I)		
				**Notable former airports**		
Grafton	~~71D~~			Roy Airfield (closed 2005?)		
Weirton				Weirton Airport (closed 1974)		

Footnotes:

== See also ==
- Essential Air Service
- Wikipedia:WikiProject Aviation/Airline destination lists: North America#West Virginia
