= USW =

USW may refer to:

== Organizations ==
=== Companies ===
- HumoAir, an Uzbekistani airline
- Ugar Sugar Works, an Indian company based in Ugar Khurd, Karnataka
- US West, an American telecommunications provider

=== Trade unions and professional associations ===
- Union of Soviet Writers
- United Seafood Workers, an American trade union to which the racketeer Joseph Lanza belonged
- United Steelworkers, a North American trade union

=== Universities and educational institutions ===
- Universitätsseminar der Wirtschaft, an educational institution that merged into the European School of Management and Technology
- University of South Wales
- University of Suwon, a university in Hwaseong, South Korea
- University of the Southwest, a private Christian university in Hobbs, New Mexico, US

== Warfare and weaponry ==
- Ultrasonic weapon
- Undersea warfare
- Universal Service Weapon, a class of firearm produced by Brügger & Thomet
- Unrestricted submarine warfare

== Other uses ==
- Boggs Field, an airport near Spencer, West Virginia, US
- Ultra-shortwave, see: Very high frequency
- Ultrasonic spot welding
- Und so weiter, a German term meaning 'et cetera'
