= I25 =

I25 may refer to:

- Hyundai i25, a car
- Interstate 25, United States
- Japanese submarine I-25, a Japanese Navy submarine
- Welch Municipal Airport, FAA identifier code I25

== See also ==
- I-25 & Broadway station, Denver, Colorado, United States
