= Mingo County Airport =

- IATA: none; ICAO: none; FAA LID: 4I0

Summary
- Airport type: Public
- Owner: Mingo County Airport Authority
- Serves: Williamson, West Virginia
- Elevation AMSL: 1,575 ft / 480 m
- Coordinates: 37°41′15″N 082°15′40″W

Map
- Location of airport in West Virginia 4I0 (the United States)

Runways
Direction	Length		Surface
Direction	ft	m	Surface
6/24	3,515	1,071	Asphalt

Statistics (2010)
- Aircraft operations: 4,520
- Based aircraft: 11
- Source: Federal Aviation Administration

Mingo County Airport (FAA LID: 4I0) is a former public use airport located one nautical mile (2 km) northeast of the central business district of Williamson, a city in Mingo County, West Virginia, United States. It is owned by the Mingo County Airport Authority. This airport was included in the National Plan of Integrated Airport Systems for 2011–2015, which categorized it as a general aviation facility.

It was replaced in 2012 by the Appalachian Regional Airport, also owned by the Mingo County Airport Authority.

== Facilities and aircraft ==
Mingo County Airport covered an area of 150 acres (61 ha) at an elevation of 1,575 feet (480 m) above mean sea level. It had one runway designated 6/24 with an asphalt surface measuring 3,515 by 60 feet (1,071 x 18 m).

For the 12-month period ending December 31, 2010, the airport had 4,520 aircraft operations, an average of 12 per day: 99.6% general aviation and 0.4% military. At that time there were 11 aircraft based at this airport, all single-engine.

== See also ==
- List of airports in West Virginia
