= Fairmont Municipal Airport =

Fairmont Municipal Airport may refer to:

- Fairmont Municipal Airport (Minnesota) in Fairmont, Minnesota, United States
- Fairmont Municipal Airport (West Virginia) in Fairmont, West Virginia, United States
