= W22 =

W22 may refer to:

- British NVC community W22, a scrub community in the British National Vegetation Classification system
- Great stellated dodecahedron
- Mercedes-Benz W22, a German sedan
- Wanderer W22, a German sedan
- Warriyangga language
- Weekend 22, a Christian music countdown
- Upshur County Regional Airport, which uses W22 as its FAA Location Identifier code.
