= HHG =

HHG may refer to:

- HHG Corporation, Extreme Championship Wrestling
- HHG Group, former name of Henderson Group, a global investment management company
- H. H. Gregg, an American electronics retailer company
- High-harmonic generation, a non-linear process during which a target is illuminated by an intense laser pulse
- The Hitchhiker's Guide to the Galaxy
- Household goods, a cargo shipping category
- Hungry, Hungry Ghost, a German band

== See also ==
- Huntington Airport (disambiguation)
