= Climate change in West Virginia =

Climate change in the US state of West Virginia

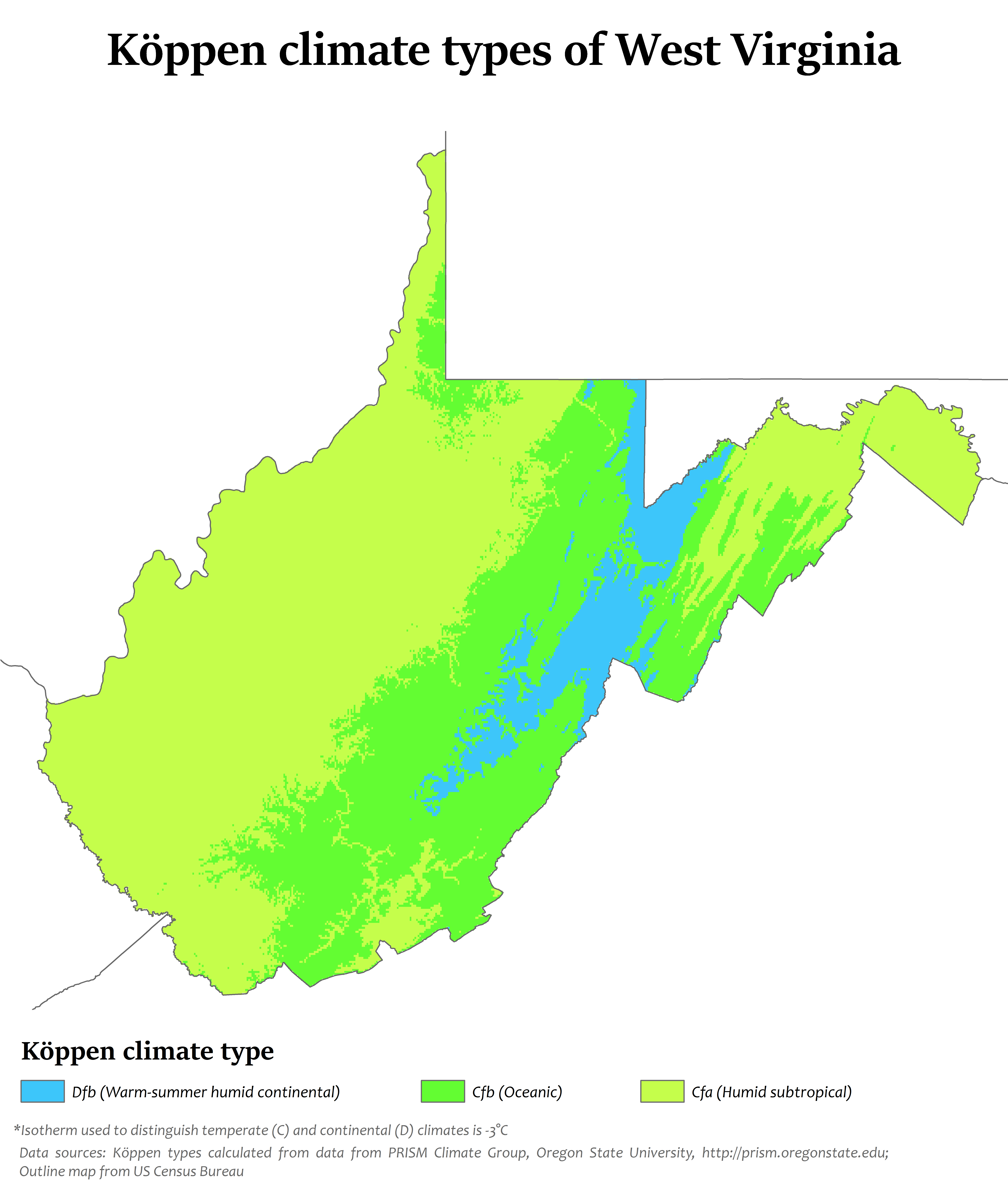
Köppen climate types in West Virginia.

Climate change in West Virginia is an ongoing concern. Most of the state has warmed one-half to one degree Fahrenheit (0.28–0.56 °C) in the last century, and heavy rainstorms are becoming more frequent. In the coming decades, a changing climate is likely to increase flooding, harm ecosystems, increase some health problems, and possibly threaten some recreational activities. The average temperature in Charleston, West Virginia, has increased 1.1 °F (0.61 °C) over the last century, and precipitation has increased by up to 10% in many parts of the state.

Over the course of the 21st century, climate in West Virginia may change even more. For example, based on projections made by the Intergovernmental Panel on Climate Change and results from the United Kingdom Hadley Centre’s climate model (HadCM2), a model that accounts for both greenhouse gases and aerosols, by 2100 temperatures in West Virginia could increase by 3 °F (1.7 °C) in winter, spring, and summer (with a range of 1–6 °F, 0.6–3.3 °C) and 4 °F (2.2 °C) in fall (with a range of 2–7 °F, 1.1–3.9 °C). Precipitation is estimated to increase by 20% (with a range of 10–30%) in all seasons, slightly more in summer. Other climate models may show different results, especially regarding estimated changes in precipitation. The impacts described in the sections that follow take into account estimates from different models. The frequency of extreme hot days in summer would increase because of the general warming trend. It is not clear how the severity of storms might be affected, although an increase in the frequency and intensity of summer thunderstorms is possible.

== Impacts ==
=== Human health ===
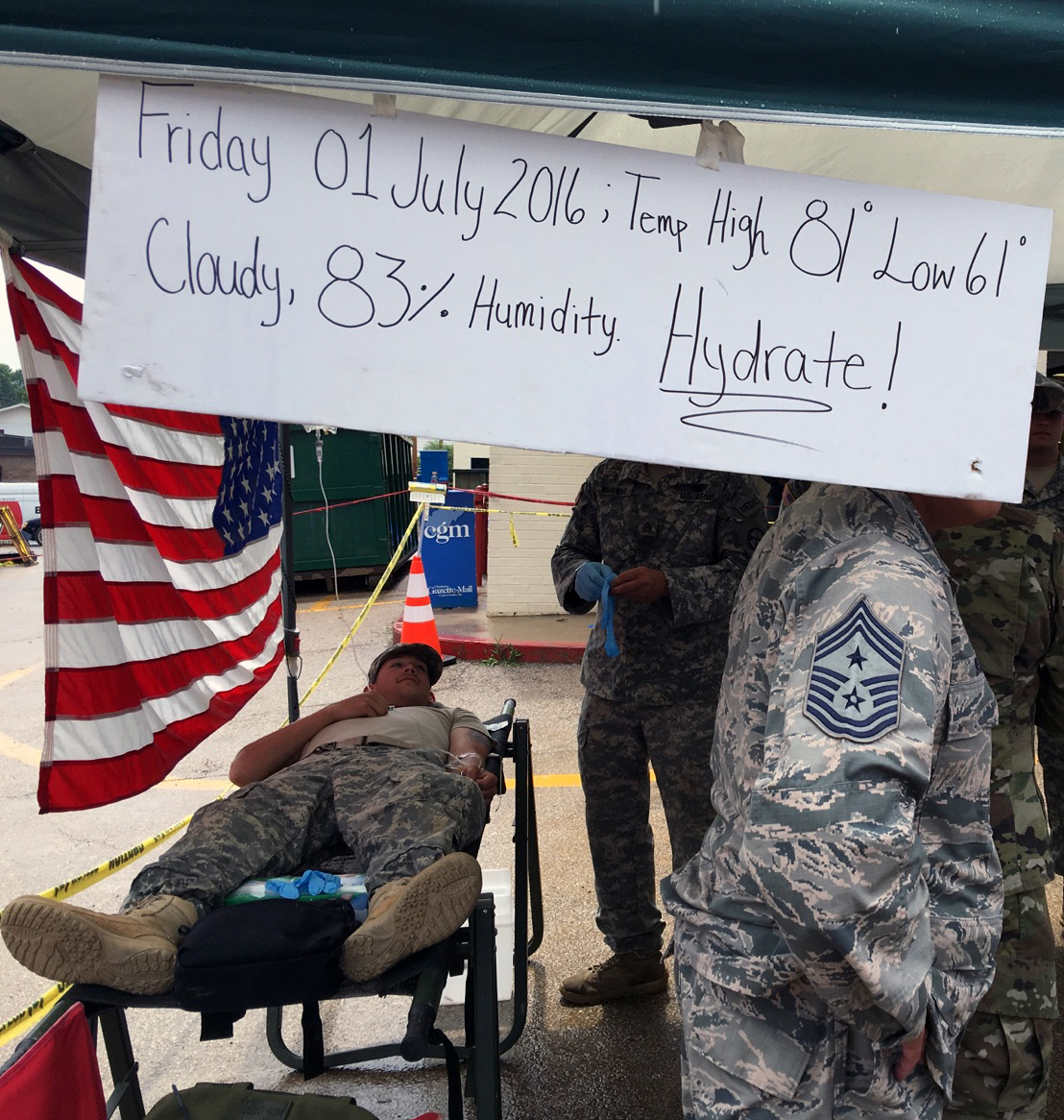
Heat stroke warning during flood cleanup

Warming and other climate changes could expand the habitat and infectiousness of disease-carrying insects, thus increasing the potential for transmission of diseases such as malaria and dengue. Warmer temperatures could increase the incidence of Lyme disease and other tick-borne diseases in West Virginia, because populations of ticks, and their rodent hosts, could increase under warmer temperatures and increased vegetation.

=== Water resources and flooding ===
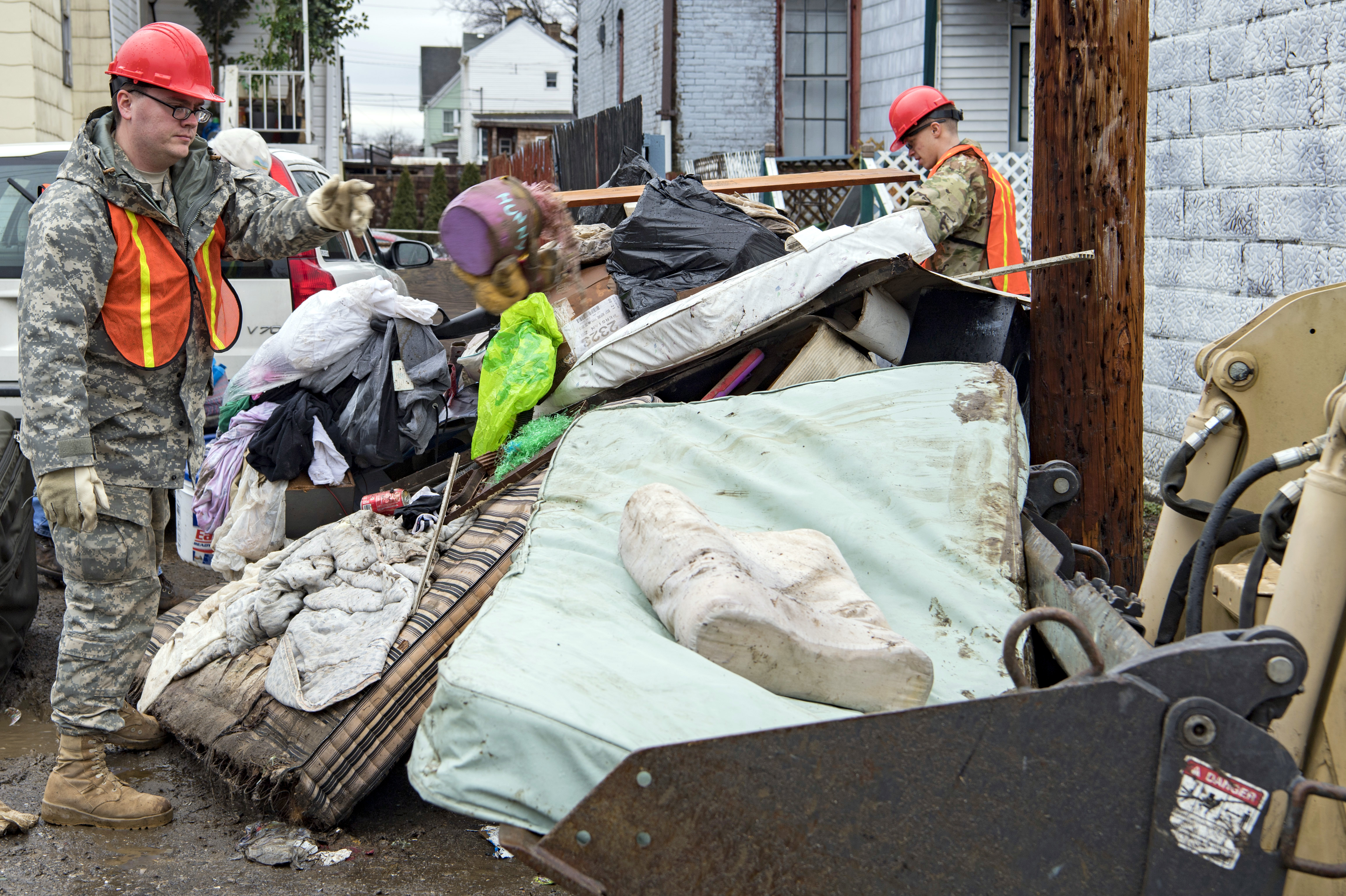
Cleanup after floods, 2018

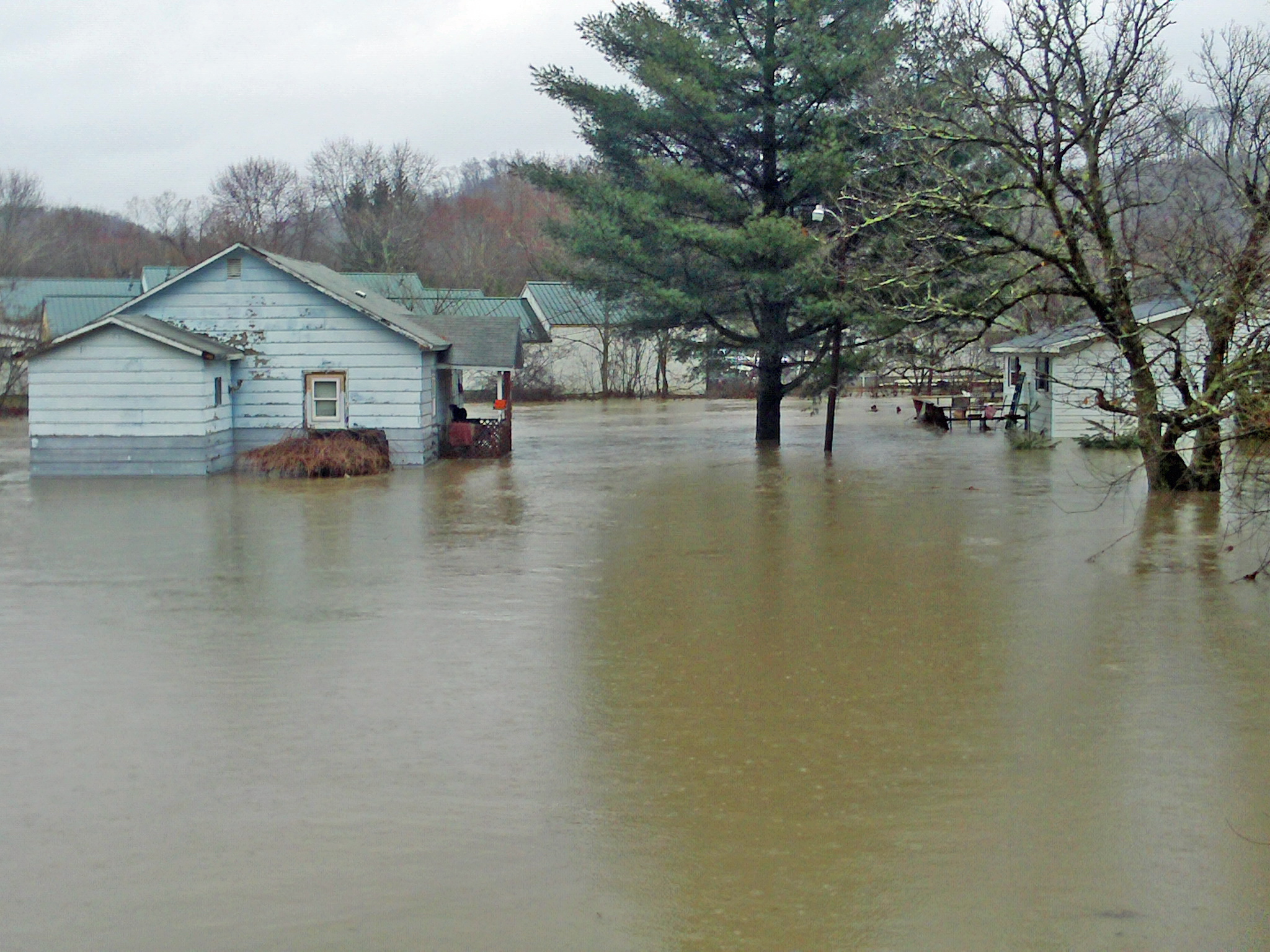
Flood on Dunloup Creek, 2010

The topography of West Virginia is rugged, and many of the rivers in the state are influenced by winter snow accumulation and spring snowmelt. A warmer climate would lead to an earlier spring snowmelt, resulting in higher streamflows in winter and spring.

Lower streamflows and lake levels in the summer and fall could affect the dependability of surface water supplies, particularly since many of the streams in West Virginia have low flows in the summer. The growing tourism and recreation industries such as whitewater rafting also could be affected by lower summer streamflows. Groundwater sources also could be reduced by lower spring and summer recharge. Lower summer streamflows and warmer temperatures could affect water quality by concentrating pollutant levels. This could exacerbate existing problems with acid drainage from coal mines, high concentrations of fecal coliform bacteria, and industrial pollution from the manufacturing plants along the floodplains of the Ohio and Kanawha rivers.

Increases in rainfall could mitigate these effects. Higher rainfall, however, could contribute to increased flooding. Most homes and businesses in West Virginia are built on flat, narrow valley floors and are susceptible to flooding. More rain also could increase erosion and exacerbate pollution in runoff areas devoted to manufacturing, coal mining, and oil and gas extraction.

According to the Fifth National Climate Assessment published in 2023, "Appalachian states like Kentucky and West Virginia have seen devastating flooding from rainstorms".

==== 2016 West Virginia flood and resiliency ====
During the June 2016 West Virginia flood, over 10 inches of rain fell, much of it within 12–18 hours. The National Weather Service described the magnitude and intensity of the rain as a "once in 1,000 years" event. A 2018 report by FEMA on lessons learned suggests that this sort of rain event and flooding may occur more frequently than has previously been expected.

One scientist from West Virginia University who concurs with these conclusions has emphasized the importance of "honest conversations about climate change and what it means for West Virginia" in order to prepare for more intense precipitation events.

The West Virginia State Resiliency Office was created in response to the disaster. In January 2020, the office was described as "barely functioning," and rebuilding from the flood remained incomplete.

=== Agriculture ===
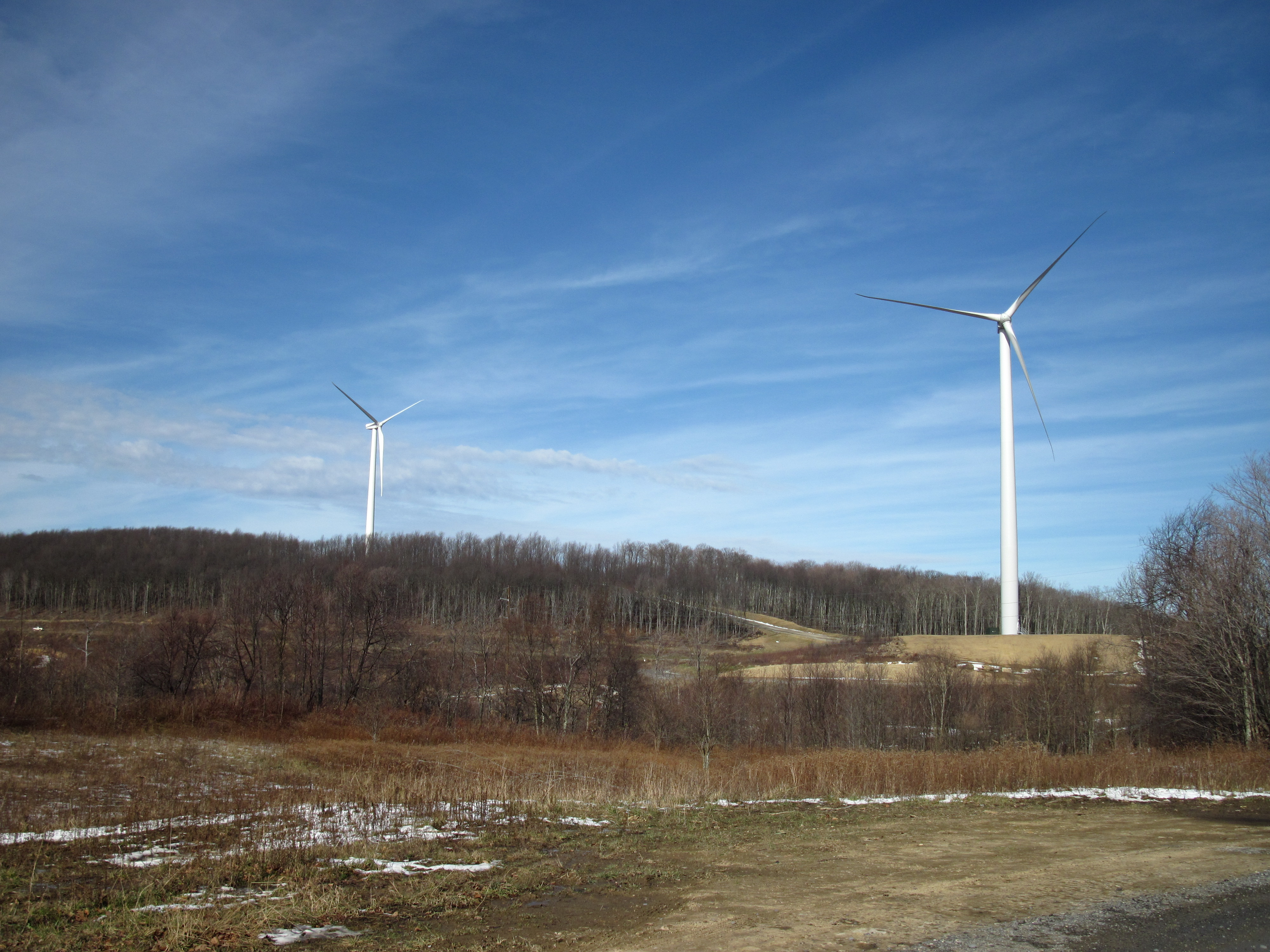
Beech Ridge wind farm

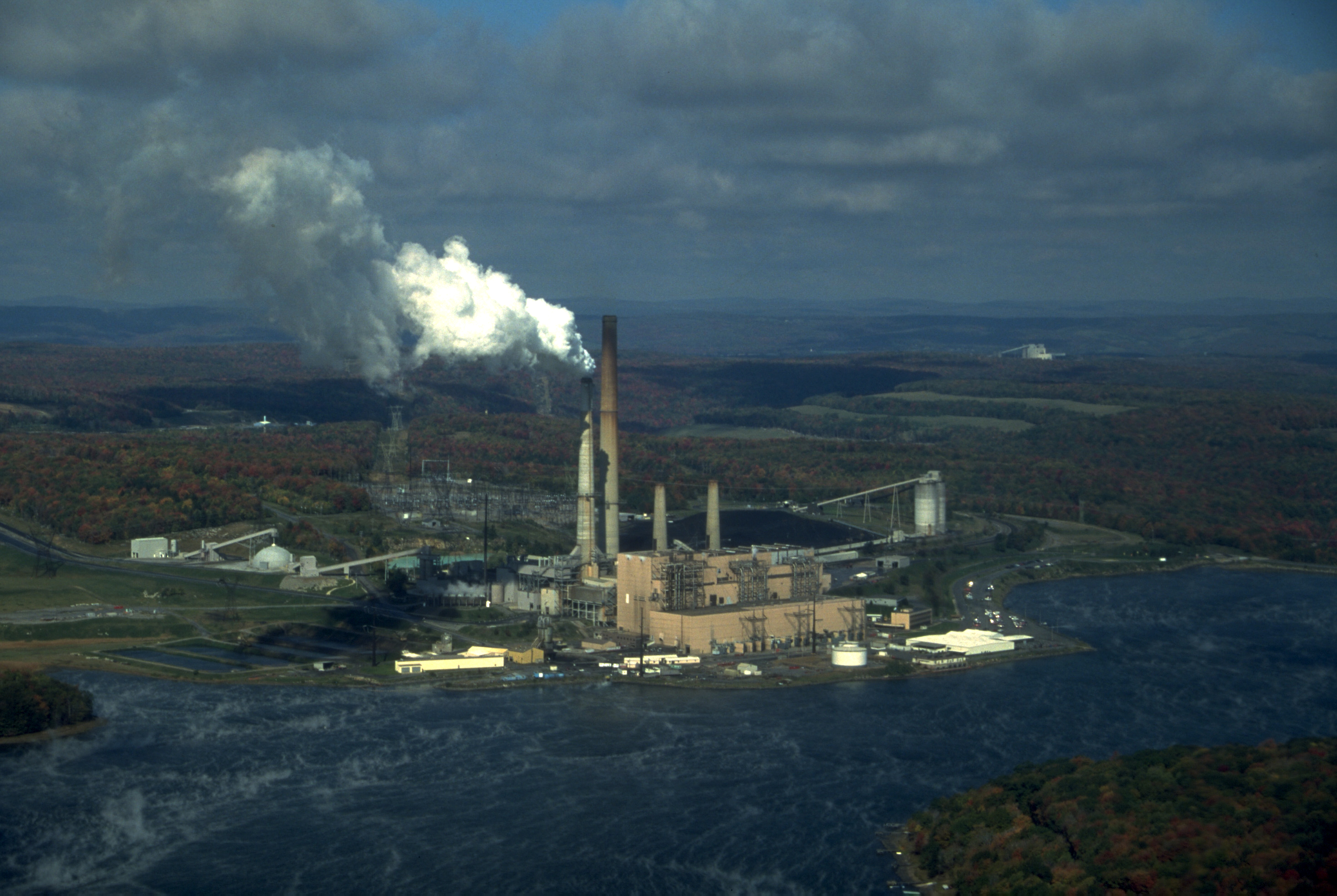
Mount Storm Power Station

In West Virginia, production agriculture is a $400 million annual industry, three-fourths of which comes from livestock, mainly cattle and poultry. Very few of the farmed acres are irrigated. The major crop in the state is hay. Hay yields could increase by about 30% as a result of climate change, leading to changes in acres farmed and production. Farmed acres could remain constant or could decrease by as much as 30% in response to changes in prices, for example, possible decreases in hay prices. Livestock and dairy production may not be affected, unless summer temperatures rise significantly and conditions become significantly drier. Under these conditions, livestock tend to gain less weight and pasture yields decline, limiting forage.

=== Forests ===
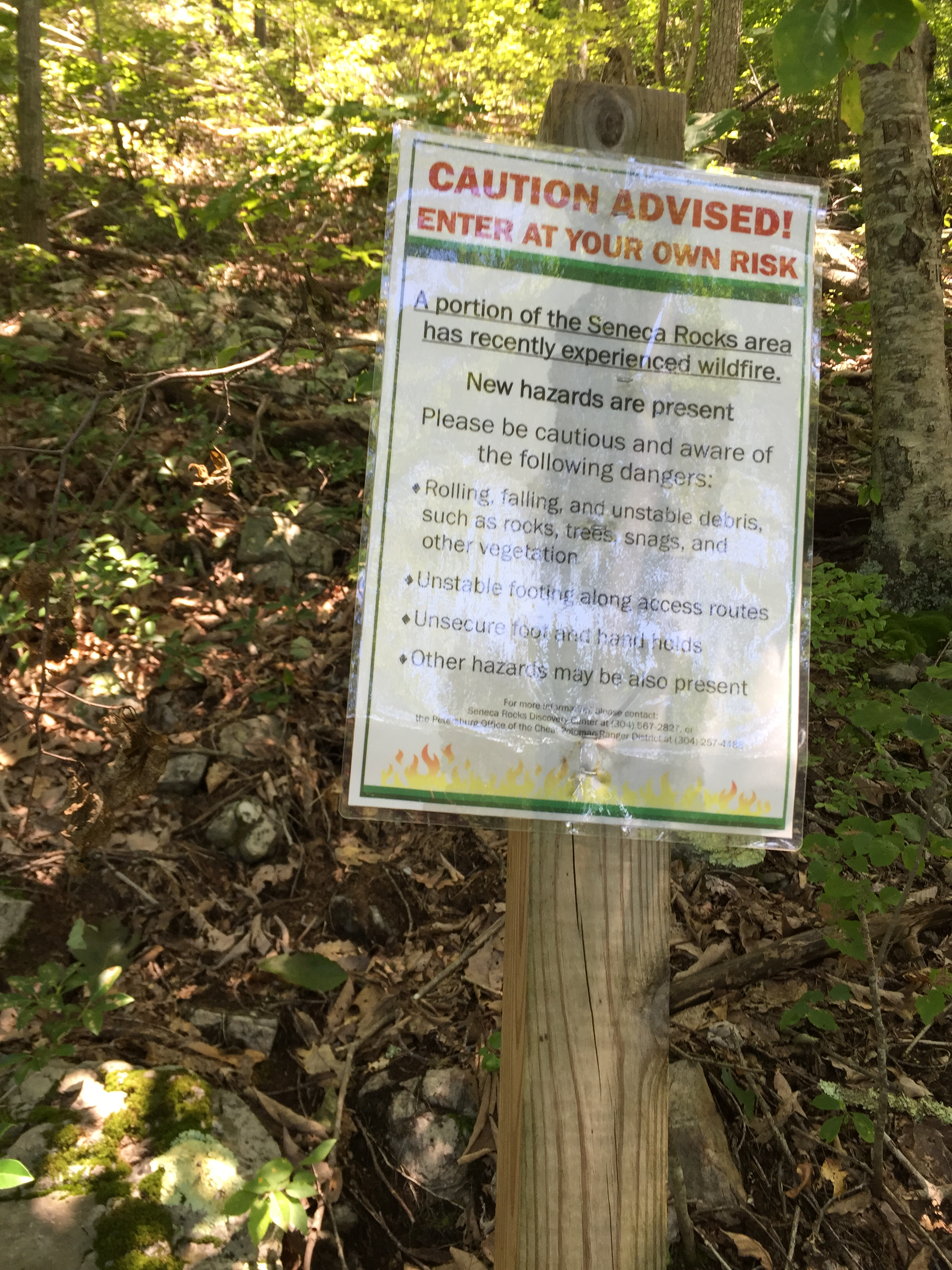
Warning of wildfires, Seneca Rocks

With changes in climate, the extent of forested areas in West Virginia could change little or decline by 5–10%. However, the types of trees dominating those forests and woodlands are likely to change. Forested areas could be increasingly dominated by pine and scrub oaks, replacing many of the eastern hardwoods common throughout West Virginia. In areas where richer soils are prevalent, southern pines could increase their range and density, and in areas with poorer soils, which are more common in West Virginia's forests, scrub oaks of little commercial value (e.g., post oak and blackjack oak) could increase their range. As a result, the character of forests in West Virginia could change. Climate change also could affect the success of tree plantings to stabilize open-face mining sites.

=== Ecosystems ===
The state of West Virginia is 97% forested, and much of this cover is in high-elevation areas. These areas contain some of the last remaining stands of red spruce, which are seriously threatened by acid rain and could be further stressed by changing climate. These forests provide habitat for many plants and animals, including the varying hare, red squirrel, the endangered Virginia northern flying squirrel, and the threatened Cheat Mountain salamander. Whereas species of lower elevations at least have the potential to move upward in response to warming temperatures, those in high elevation areas do not. Given a sufficient change in climate, these spruce forests could be substantially reduced, or could disappear.

West Virginia has the fourth highest number of caves (including 3,300 limestone caves) in the nation and 11 of the world's 50 longest caves. At least eight species of bats, including two that are federally endangered (Indiana bat and the Virginia big-eared bat), use caves as winter hibernation roosts or to raise young in the summer. One cave protects over 5,000 Indiana bats each winter, and another contains the largest known concentration of hibernating Virginia big-eared bats as well as the largest known maternity colony. Higher-than-normal winter temperatures could boost temperatures inside cave bat roosting sites, which has been shown to cause higher mortality due to increased winter body weight loss in endangered Indiana bats (e.g., an increase of 9 °F (−13 °C) during winter hibernation has been associated with a 42% increase in the rate of body mass loss). The south branch cave beetle is another endangered cave dweller.

Another unique West Virginia ecosystem is in the Ice Mountain Preserve. In a small slope area there are 60 small holes and openings at the base of a rock talus whose vents blow 38 °F (3 °C) air year round. As a result, high elevation boreal plants group around the cold air vents, where ice can be seen well into May. The effects of gradually warming temperatures are already noticeable on Ice Mountain, and ice around the vents is disappearing earlier in the year. This could adversely impact the boreal plants found in this system.

== See also ==
- Environmental issues in the United States
- Plug-in electric vehicles in West Virginia
