= Kanawha Valley Regional Transportation Authority =

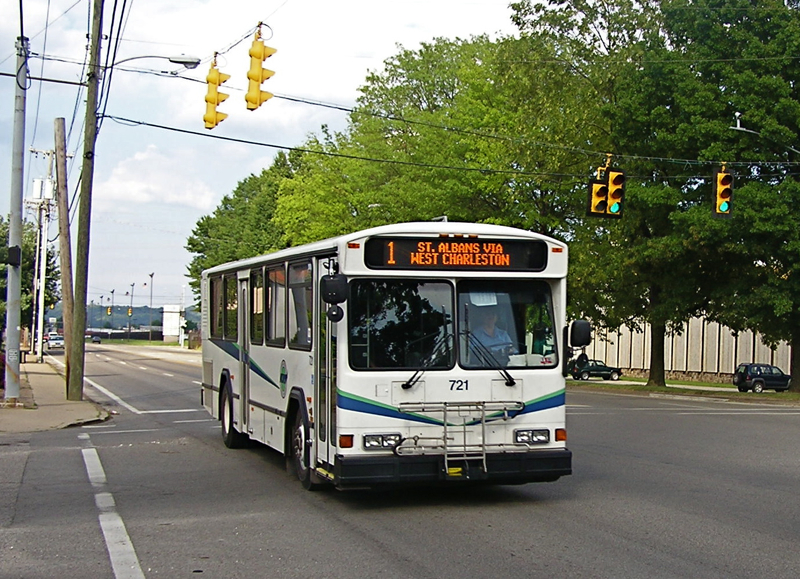
- Founded: 1971
- Headquarters: 1550 Fourth Avenue
- Locale: Charleston, WV
- Service type: bus service, paratransit
- Routes: 22
- Website: rideonkrt.com

The Kanawha Valley Regional Transportation Authority, commonly known as "KRT" is the city bus system for the Charleston, West Virginia, United States metropolitan area.

The system ranges throughout the Charleston metro area, from Montgomery, West Virginia in the south east, about 45 miles west to Nitro, West Virginia. All buses centralize on the former Laidley Street in downtown Charleston, which is now known as the Transit Mall and is restricted to buses only.

== History ==
The tax supported system was founded in 1971 after the Greyhound Corporation and the privately owned Charleston Transit Company ceased intra-city bus service following a strike.

The KRT also was involved in a Joint Venture with the Tri-State Transit Authority known as Intelligent Transit which provides a link between Charleston and Huntington, West Virginia, but this ended in 2015 due to low ridership.

== Routes ==
All routes except No. 9 depart from Downtown Charleston. Route 9 connects to Route 2 at Cabin Creek Junction and to Route 22 at Quincy Walmart and Montgomery.

No.	Route Name	Terminus	Service Times
1	St. Albans/West Charleston	St. Albans	7 day service
2	Kanawha City/Cabin Creek	Cabin Creek	7 day service
3	Dunbar/Nitro	Nitro Marketplace	7 day service
4	Woodward Drive	Woodrum Park	Weekday service
5	Tyler Mountain/Cross Lanes	Nitro Marketplace	Mon-Sat service
6	Elkview	The Crossings Mall	Mon-Sat service
7	Campbells Creek	Cinco	Weekday service
8	Sissonville	Sissonville	Mon-Sat service
9	Montgomery/Eskdale	Montgomery or Leewood	Weekday service
11	Oakridge Drive/Wertz Avenue	Charleston Heights	Mon-Sat service
12	Garrison Avenue/Hillsdale	Hillsdale	Mon-Sat service
13	Beech Avenue	Cato Park	Mon-Sat service
15	South Hills	Ashton Place	Mon-Sat service
16	South Park/Memorial Hospital	South Park	Mon-Sat service
18	Fort Hill/Montrose	Riverwalk Plaza	Mon-Sat service
20	Virginia Street	Government Complex	Mon-Sat service
21	Southridge/Alum Creek	Alum Creek	7 day service
22	Montgomery/Quincy	Montgomery	7 day service
23	Clendenin	Clendenin	Mon-Sat service
24	Sugar Creek	Sugar Creek	Weekday service
28	Hillcrest/Northgate	Northgate Business Park	Mon-Sat service
34	Downtown Trolley	(Downtown Loop)	Mon-Sat service

== Electric buses ==
A fleet of seven new hybrid electric-diesel buses were purchased in 2009 with funding provided by the federal Diesel Emissions Reduction Act, as well as $1.73 million in stimulus funds awarded to the state Department of Environmental Protection and the state Department of Transportation's Division of Public Transit.

== See also ==
- Transportation in Huntington, West Virginia
