= Transportation, Remuneration, Incentive Program =

The Transportation, Remuneration, Incentive Program (TRIP) was a five-year public transit program from 1974–1979 operated by the state of West Virginia, which later funded bus systems in the state.

Final report document, July 1982

== History ==
The TRIP program was proposed in 1973 by governor Arch A. Moore Jr and it went into effect in July 1974. The program targeted rural and suburban areas to meet unserved transportation needs from low-income, elderly, and handicapped people. The program dealt with inflation and struggling bus systems. Funding was acquired from the state, the Community Services Administration, the Urban Mass Transit Administration, the Federal Highway Administration, the Administration on Aging, and the Department of Health Education and Welfare. The pilot ended on June 30, 1979, with a 100% increase in ridership and a 144% increase in revenue. 12,000 subsidy tickets were sold to disabled, elderly, and low-income riders. Most riders used the transit systems for work or shopping-related purposes. 22 out of the 55 counties in West Virginia participated in TRIP. A problem found with the implantation of the bus systems was a "lack of a comprehensive database." Taxi companies benefited from the program.

Between 1979 and 1980, the former TRIP program guaranteed transit agencies $1,200,000 in state and federal funding that was matched with local funding. The funds fell onto the responsibility of local politicians.

Later, public transit authorities were created under Section 147 to better serve the general public. Central West Virginia Transit Authority, Eastern Panhandle Transit Authority, Fairmont Marion County Transit Authority, Monongalia County Transit Authority, Mountain Transit Authority, Ohio Valley Regional Transportation Authority, and Potomac Valley Transit Authority were funded by TRIP.
