= Jackson County Airport (West Virginia) =

Public-use airport serving Ravenswood, West Virginia, United States

- IATA: none; ICAO: none; FAA LID: I18

Summary
- Airport type: Public
- Owner: Jackson County Commission
- Serves: Ravenswood, West Virginia
- Elevation AMSL: 758 ft (231 m)
- Coordinates: 38°55′47″N 081°49′10″W
- Interactive map of Jackson County Airport

Runways
Direction	Length		Surface
Direction	ft	m	Surface
4/22	4,001	1,220	Asphalt

Statistics (2009)
- Aircraft operations: 12,402
- Based aircraft: 21
- Source: Federal Aviation Administration

Jackson County Airport (FAA LID: I18) is a county-owned, public-use airport located six nautical miles (11 km) southwest of the central business district of Ravenswood, in Jackson County, West Virginia, United States.

== Facilities and aircraft ==
Jackson County Airport covers an area of 217 acres (88 ha) at an elevation of 758 feet (231 m) above mean sea level. It has one runway designated 4/22 with an asphalt surface measuring 4,001 by 75 feet (1,220 x 23 m).

For the 12-month period ending July 6, 2009, the airport had 12,402 aircraft operations, an average of 33 per day: 97% general aviation, 2% military, and 1% air taxi, At that time there were 21 aircraft based at this airport: 90% single-engine, 5% multi-engine and 5% ultralight.

== See also ==
- List of airports in West Virginia
