= Marshall County Airport (West Virginia) =

Public airport in West Virginia

Coordinates: 39°52′51″N 080°44′09″W

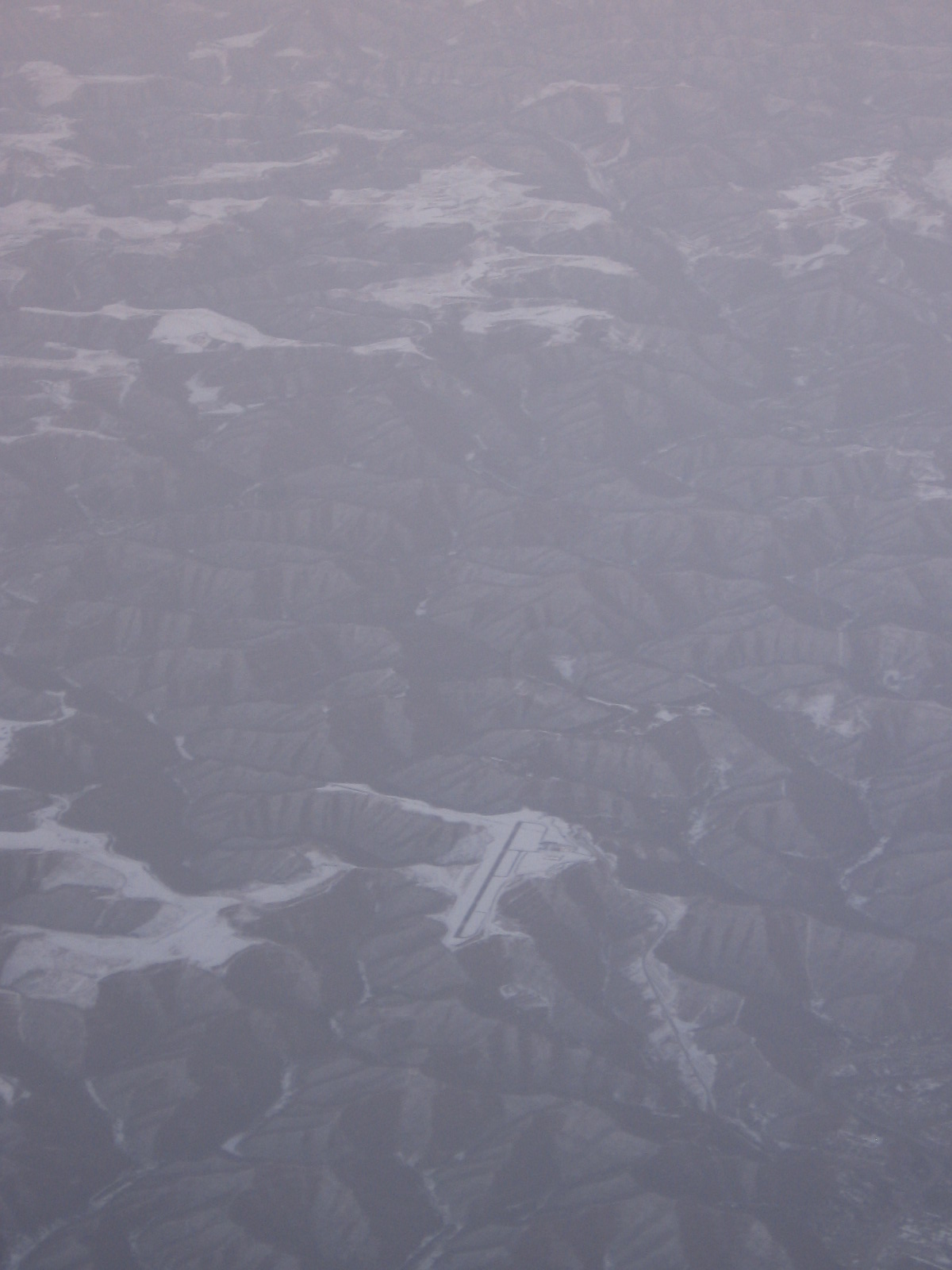
- IATA: none; ICAO: KMPG; FAA LID: MPG

Summary
- Airport type: Public
- Owner: Marshall County Commission
- Serves: Moundsville, West Virginia
- Elevation AMSL: 1,214 ft / 370 m
- Interactive map of Marshall County Airport

Runways
Direction	Length		Surface
Direction	ft	m	Surface
6/24	3,302	1,006	Asphalt

Statistics (2006)
- Aircraft operations: 19,300
- Source: Federal Aviation Administration

Marshall County Airport (ICAO: KMPG, FAA LID: MPG, formerly 74D) is a public airport located three miles (5 km) south of the central business district of Moundsville, a city in Marshall County, West Virginia, United States. The airport is owned by the Marshall County Commission.

Although most U.S. airports use the same three-letter location identifier for the FAA and IATA, Marshall County Airport is assigned MPG by the FAA but has no designation from the IATA (which assigned MPG to Makini, Papua New Guinea).

== Facilities and aircraft ==
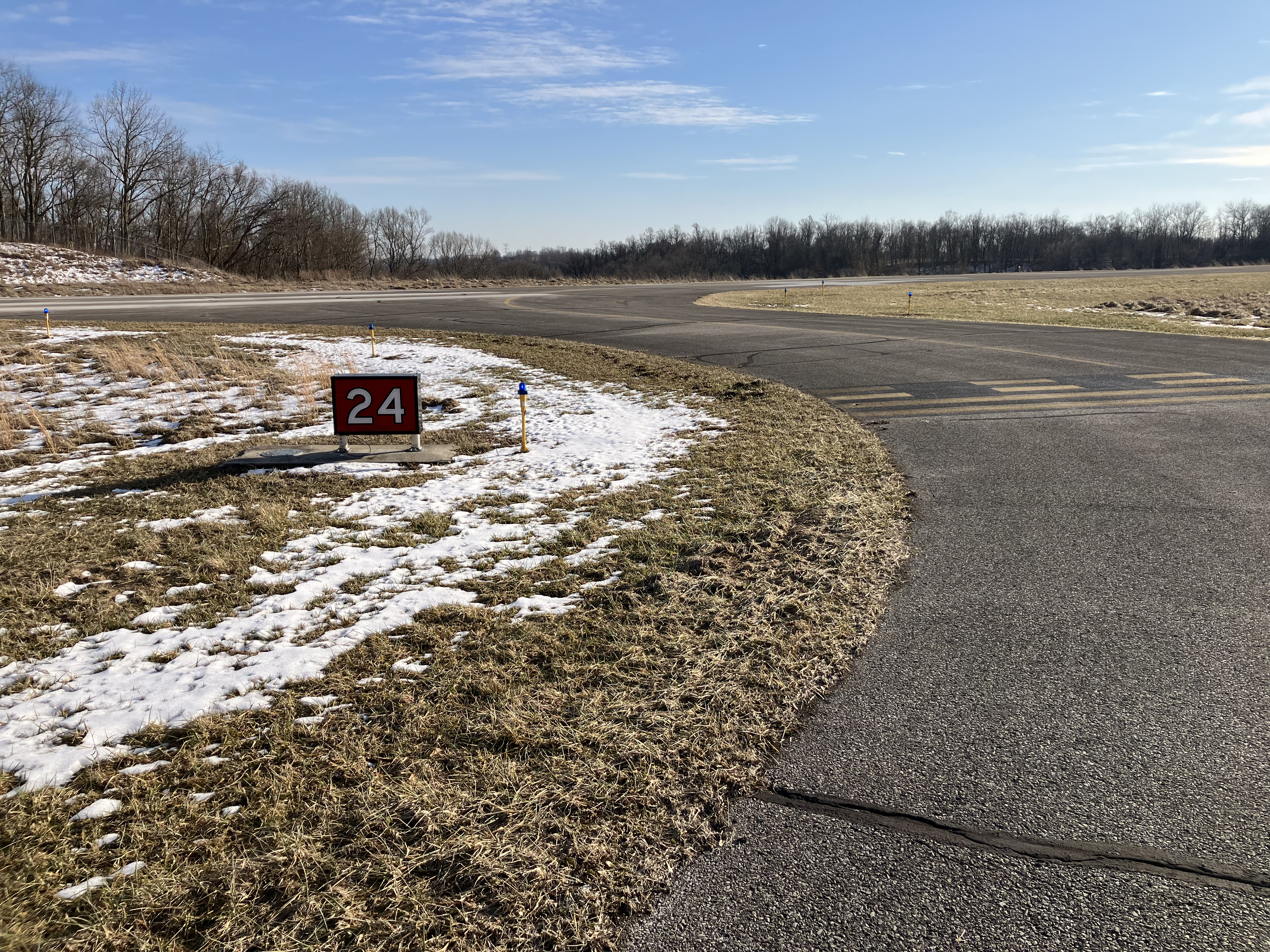
Runway 24

Marshall County Airport covers an area of 96 acres (39 ha) which contains one runway designated 6/24 with a 3,302 x 60 ft (1,006 x 18 m) asphalt surface. Situated in rugged mountain terrain, the airport site is a removed mountaintop with steep slopes to all sides. For the 12-month period ending December 31, 2006, the airport had 19,300 aircraft operations, an average of 52 per day: 97% general aviation, 3% military and <1% air taxi.

== Accidents & incidents ==
- On June 9, 2016, a Tecnam P2002 Sierra crashed while landing at the Marshall County Airport. The probable cause of the accident was found to be the pilot's failure to maintain directional control during the go-around in gusty crosswind conditions, which resulted in a collision with trees.

== See also ==
- List of airports in West Virginia
