= Grant County Airport (West Virginia) =

Public use airport in West Virginia

- IATA: PGC; ICAO: none; FAA LID: W99

Summary
- Airport type: Public
- Owner: Grant County Airport Authority
- Serves: Petersburg, West Virginia
- Elevation AMSL: 963 ft (294 m)
- Coordinates: 38°59′42″N 079°08′45″W
- Interactive map of Grant County Airport

Runways
Direction	Length		Surface
Direction	ft	m	Surface
13/31	5,000	1,524	Asphalt

Statistics (2009)
- Aircraft operations: 14,000
- Based aircraft: 24
- Source: Federal Aviation Administration

Grant County Airport (IATA: PGC, FAA LID: W99) is a public use airport in Grant County, West Virginia, United States. It is located one nautical mile (2 km) southwest of the central business district of Petersburg, West Virginia, and owned by the Grant County Airport Authority. This airport is included in the National Plan of Integrated Airport Systems for 2011–2015, which categorized it as a general aviation facility.

== Facilities and aircraft ==
Grant County Airport covers an area of 188 acres (76 ha) at an elevation of 963 feet (294 m) above mean sea level. It has one runway designated 13/31 with an asphalt surface measuring 5,000 by 75 feet (1,524 x 23 m).

For the 12-month period ending December 31, 2009, the airport had 14,000 aircraft operations, an average of 38 per day: 99% general aviation and 1% military. At that time there were 24 aircraft based at this airport: 71% single-engine, 13% multi-engine, 4% helicopter, and 13% glider.

== See also ==
- List of airports in West Virginia
