= Potomac Highlands Airport Authority =

Interstate agency and airport operator

The Potomac Highlands Airport Authority is an Interstate Agency that operates the Greater Cumberland Regional Airport, two miles south of Cumberland, Maryland in the state of West Virginia. The authority was ratified in 1976 by the legislatures of Maryland and West Virginia (Maryland Chapter 253, Acts of 1976; West Virginia Chapter 135, Acts of 1976), and by the US Congress in 1988 (P.L 105-348).
