= Huntington Airport =

Huntington Airport may refer to:

- Huntington Municipal Airport (Indiana) in Huntington, Indiana, United States (FAA: HHG)
- Huntington Municipal Airport (Utah) in Huntington, Utah, United States (FAA: 69V)

Other airports in places named Huntington:

- Tri-State Airport in Huntington, West Virginia, United States (FAA: HTS)
- Robert Newlon Field in Huntington, West Virginia, United States (FAA: I41)
- Lawrence County Airpark in Chesapeake, Ohio, serving Huntington, West Virginia, United States (FAA: HTW)
