= Herron Airport =

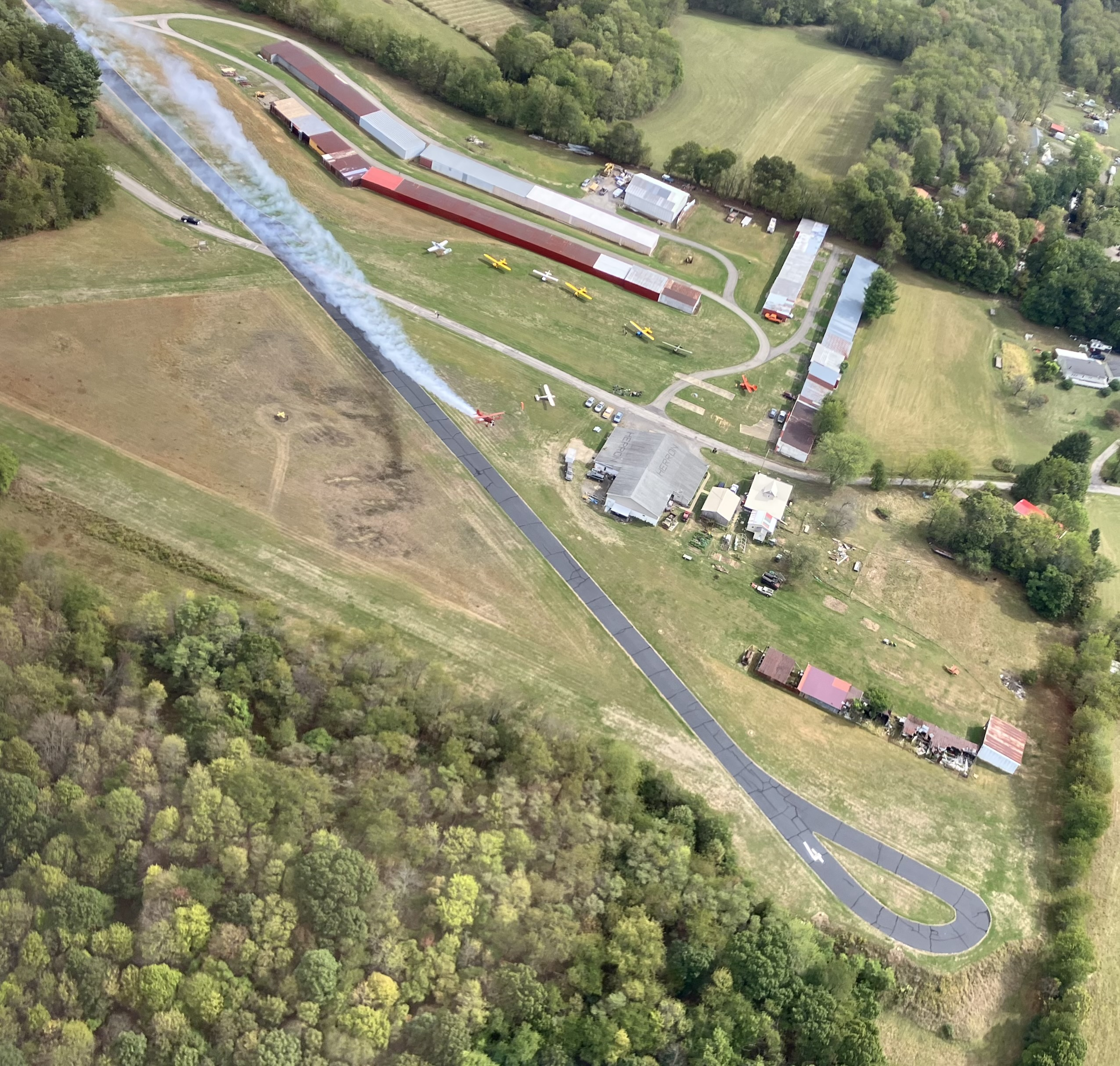
- A Boeing Stearman A75 taking off from runway 22 with
- IATA: none; ICAO: none; FAA LID: 7G1

Summary
- Airport type: Public
- Owner: Private
- Operator: Steven T. Roman
- Serves: Pittsburgh metropolitan area
- Location: New Cumberland, West Virginia
- Elevation AMSL: 1,226 ft (374 m)
- Coordinates: 40°31′59″N 080°32′28″W
- Interactive map of Herron Airport

Runways
Direction	Length		Surface
Direction	ft	m	Surface
4/22	2,030	619	Asphalt
1/19	1,200	366	Turf

Statistics (2022)
- Aircraft operations (year ending 7/8/2022): 2,003
- Based aircraft: 32
- Source: Federal Aviation Administration

Herron Airport (FAA LID: 7G1) is a privately owned airport in New Cumberland, West Virginia, United States, part of the Pittsburgh Combined Statistical Area. It was opened in December 1945, founded by William Earle "Earle" Herron.

== See also ==
- List of airports in West Virginia
