= Greenbrier Academy =

Defunct therapeutic boarding school in Pence Springs, West Virginia, United States

Coordinates: 37.6856°N 80.7154°W

Location
- 158 Academy Lane; Pence Springs, West Virginia 24962; US

Information
- Type: Private, Boarding
- Founder: L. Jay Mitchell
- Closed: 2023
- NCES School ID: A0990141
- Director: John Grago
- Grades: 8-12
- Website: Greenbrier Academy

Greenbrier Academy for Girls (GBA) was a therapeutic, college preparatory boarding school in Pence Springs, West Virginia for grades 8–12. Surrounded by a 140-acre (57 ha) campus, the academy's main building is listed on the National Register of Historic Places. GBA is located in rural southeastern West Virginia. The academy has been linked to multiple cases of child neglect, as well as the troubled teen industry. Greenbrier Academy announced plans to close on March 13, 2023.

== School structure ==
The school was accredited by AdvancED and the North Central Association Commission on Accreditation and School Improvement. The school offered a traditional curriculum of high-school level Mathematics, English, Science, Social Studies, and various languages. The average class size was about ten students.

== Extracurricular activities ==
The school also offered activities which include Yearbook Club, Running Club, Poetry Club, music lessons, basketball, skiing and outdoor adventures. The school also gave students the chance participate in service to the community and to go on service trips to Africa and Nicaragua.

== Therapeutics ==
The school offered a number of therapy programs, centered on a philosophy called "Strong" or "Applied Relationality." This philosophy is not widely recognized and seems to be based on a book by the founder of the school, self-proclaimed guru and former lawyer L. Jay Mitchell (see Controversy below). This philosophy claims that the "primary cause" of apparently any symptoms exhibited by adolescents is that "her perceptions of past, present, and future relational experiences." According to the philosophy, "Present perceptions of past experiences guide our behaviors and emotions" and that through viewing things in the appropriate context, healing can happen. The philosophy appears to be similar to Social Cognitive Theory.

As part of its therapeutic mission, the school offered animal therapy, a family program, and something the school calls "Village" which is based on a therapeutic construct called the "Hermeneutic Circle."

The school also offers continuing care through its Alumni network.
