= Varney, West Virginia =

- Unincorporated community
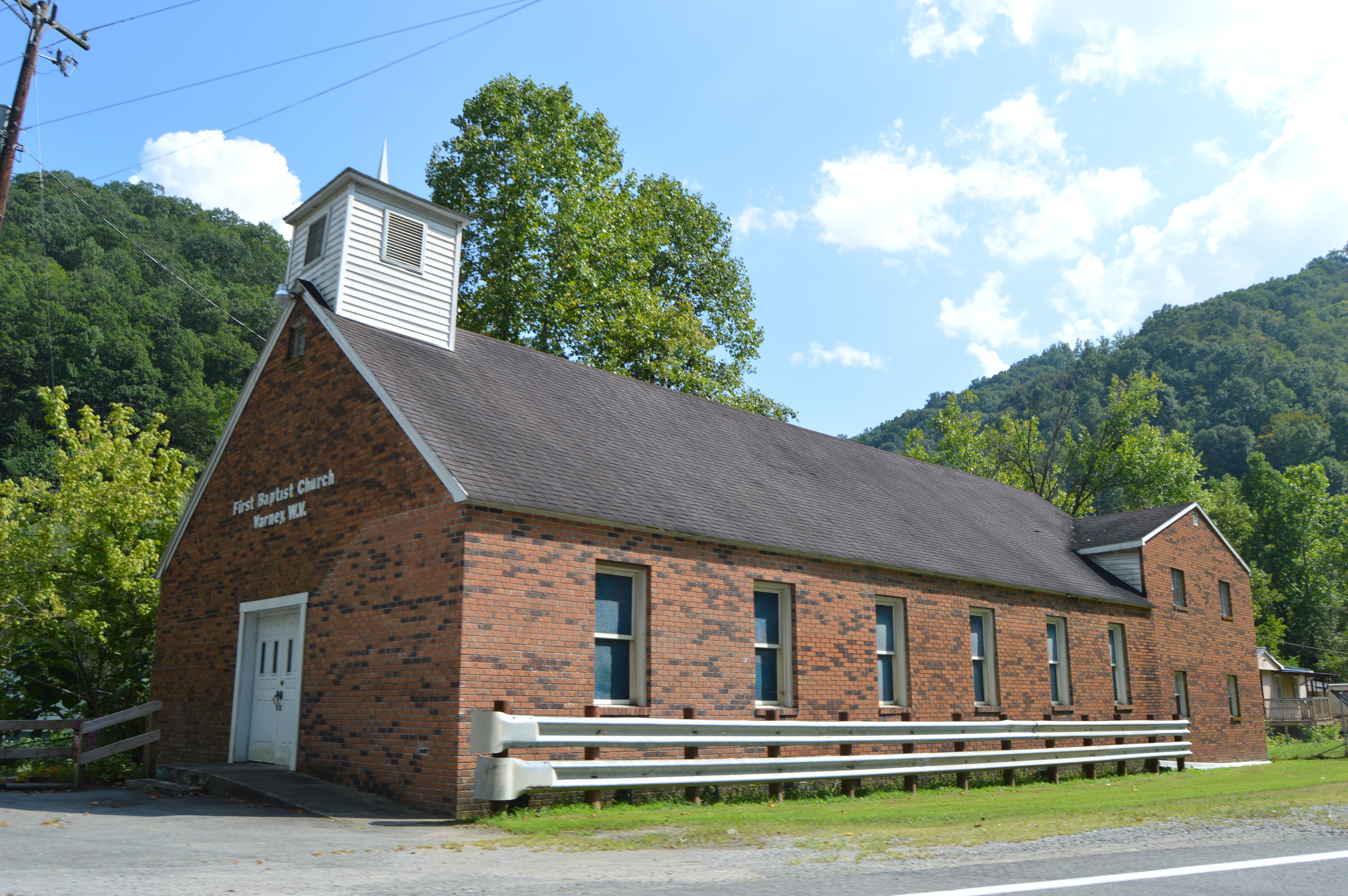
- First Baptist Church

- Location within the state of West Virginia Varney, West Virginia (the United States)
- Coordinates: 37°40′9″N 82°7′19″W
- Country: United States
- State: West Virginia
- County: Mingo
- Time zone: UTC-5 (Eastern (EST))
  - Summer (DST): UTC-4 (EDT)
- ZIP code: 25696
- GNIS feature ID: 1548630

Varney is an unincorporated community in Mingo County, West Virginia, United States. It is located approximately 6 mi (9.7 km) southeast of Delbarton.

== History ==
Development of the Appalachian Regional Airport north of Varney began in 2012. The airport was "about 95 percent complete" in July 2018, and had "several hurdles to clear" before it could open.

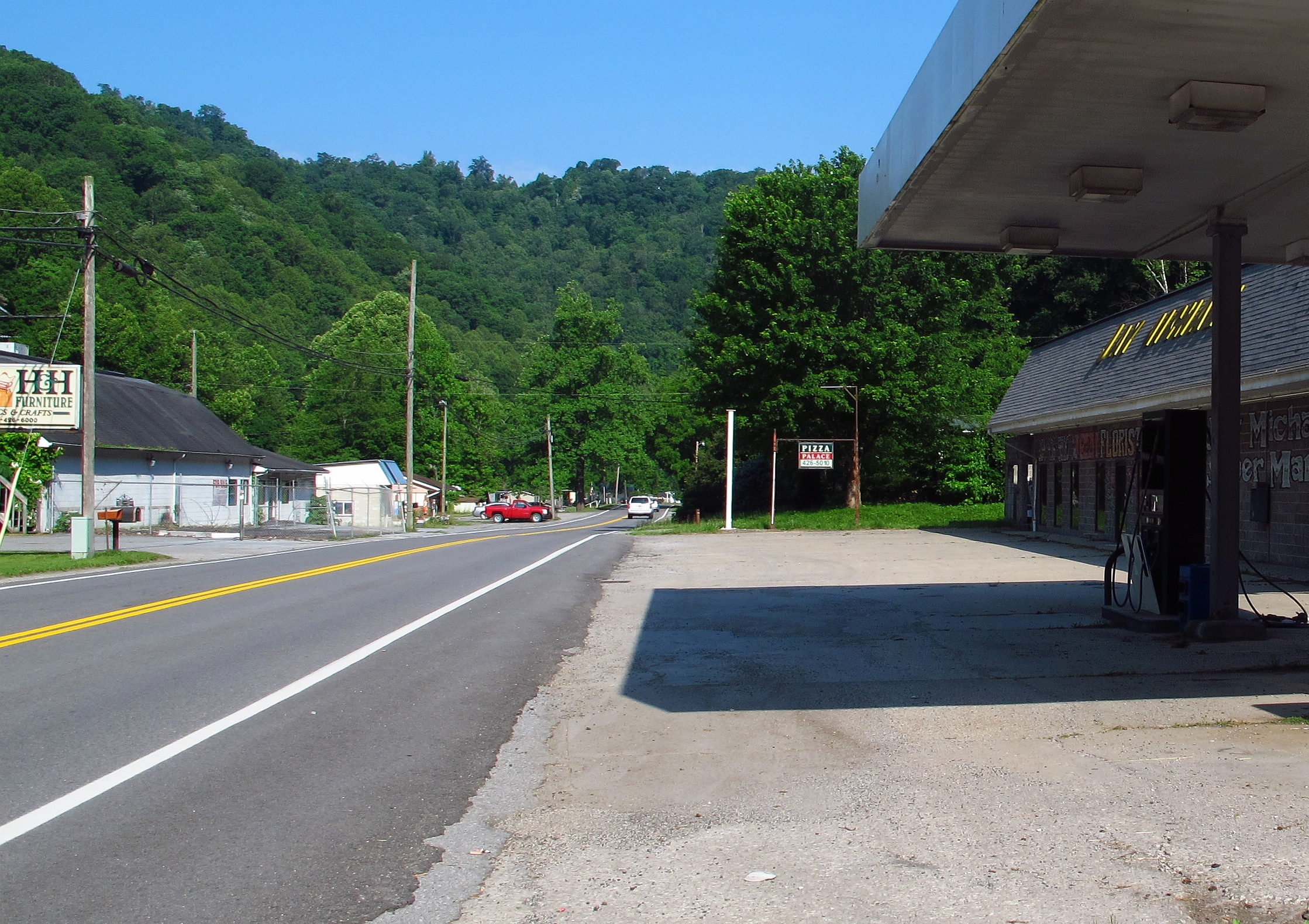
Varney in 2014
