= Pence Springs Hotel Historic District =

Historic district in West Virginia, United States

- U.S. National Register of Historic Places
- U.S. Historic district
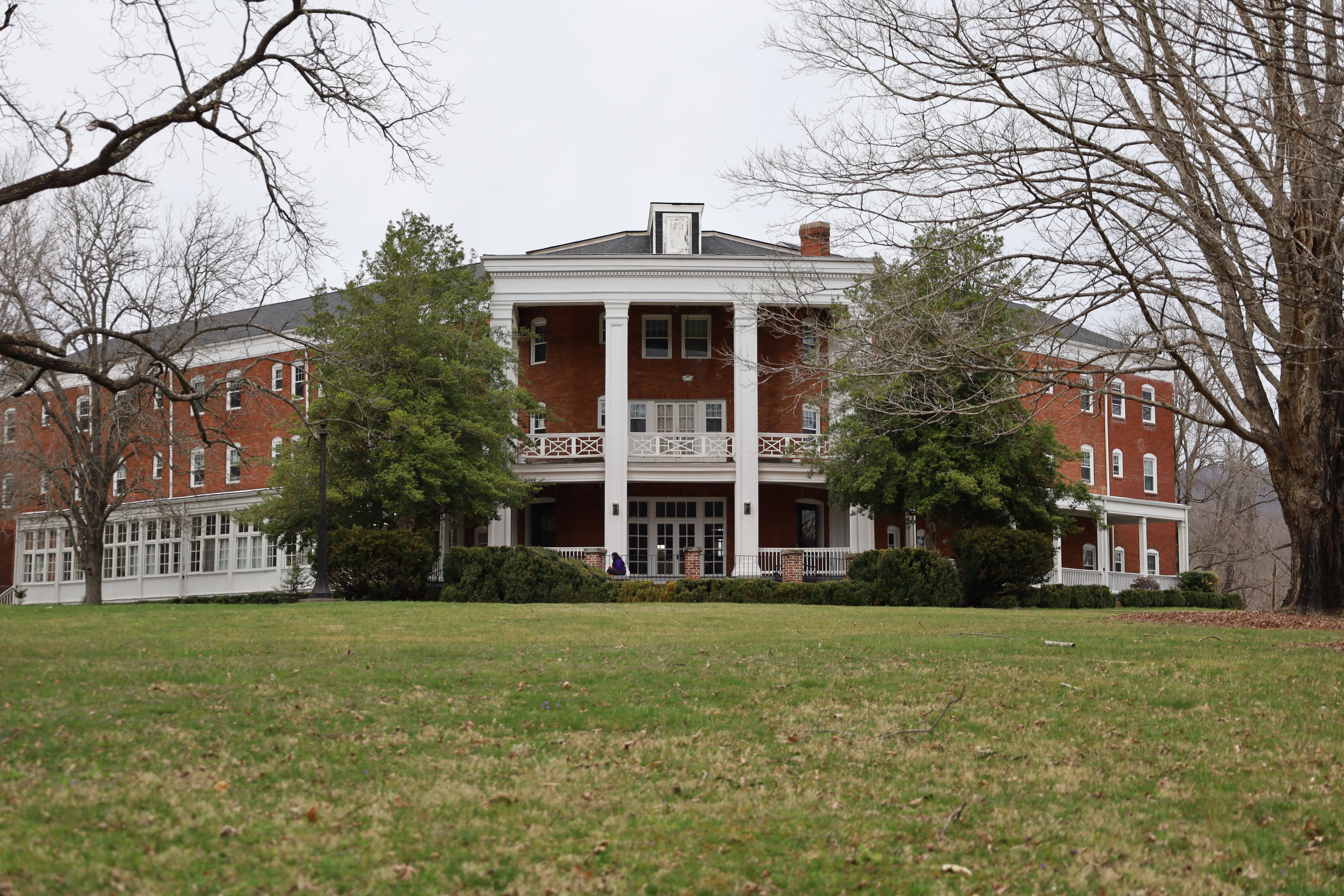
- The former main hotel building in 2022

- Location within West Virginia Location within the United States
- Location: Roughly bounded by Buggy Branch, Buggy Branch Rd., WV 3 and Pence Springs Access Rd., Pence Springs, West Virginia
- Coordinates: 37°41′4″N 80°43′10″W
- Area: 30 acres (12 ha)
- Built: 1901
- Architect: Meanor & Sweeney; Park-Grimm Corp.
- Architectural style: Colonial Revival, Bungalow/Craftsman, Georgian Revival
- NRHP reference No.: 85000404
- Added to NRHP: February 27, 1985

The Pence Springs Hotel Historic District is a national historic district located at Pence Springs, Summers County, West Virginia. It encompasses seven contributing buildings and two contributing structures. They are the Pence Springs Hotel Building (1916-1918), Pavilion / Casino (1919), Hotel Manager's Residence / Warden's Residence (c. 1919), Hotel Garage (1925), Golf Caddy House (1919), Pence Springs Bottling Works (c. 1915), and Pence Springhouse (c. 1901).

It was listed on the National Register of Historic Places in 1985.
