= West Virginia Department of Environmental Protection =

West Virginia government department

Agency overview
- Formed: 2001
- Jurisdiction: State of West Virginia
- Agency executive: Austin Caperton, West Virginia Secretary of Environmental Protection
- Website: www.dep.wv.gov

The West Virginia Department of Environmental Protection is a government agency of the U.S. state of West Virginia.

The Department originated as the Division of Environmental Protection (an agency of the Department of Commerce, Labor and Environmental Resources), created in October 1992. The Division was elevated to a Cabinet-level Department in 2001.

== See also ==
- Climate change in West Virginia
