= Leon Airport (West Virginia) =

- IATA: none; ICAO: none; FAA LID: W07

Summary
- Airport type: Public use
- Owner: James Upton
- Serves: Leon, West Virginia
- Elevation AMSL: 563 ft / 172 m
- Coordinates: 38°42′13″N 081°57′08″W

Map
- Location of airport in West Virginia W07 (the United States)

Runways
Direction	Length		Surface
Direction	ft	m	Surface
3/21	3,100	945	Turf

Statistics (2012)
- Aircraft operations: 1,000
- Based aircraft: 30
- Source: Federal Aviation Administration

Leon Airport (FAA LID: W07) is a privately owned, public use airport located three nautical miles (6 km) south of the central business district of Leon, in Mason County, West Virginia, United States.

== Facilities and aircraft ==
Leon Airport covers an area of 10 acres (4 ha) at an elevation of 563 feet (172 m) above mean sea level. It has one runway designated 3/21 with a turf surface measuring 3,100 by 45 feet (945 x 14 m).

For the 12-month period ending July 1, 2012, the airport had 1,000 general aviation aircraft operations, an average of 83 per month. At that time there were 30 aircraft based at this airport: 93% ultralight and 7% single-engine.

== See also ==
- List of airports in West Virginia
