= Pence Springs, West Virginia =

- Unincorporated community
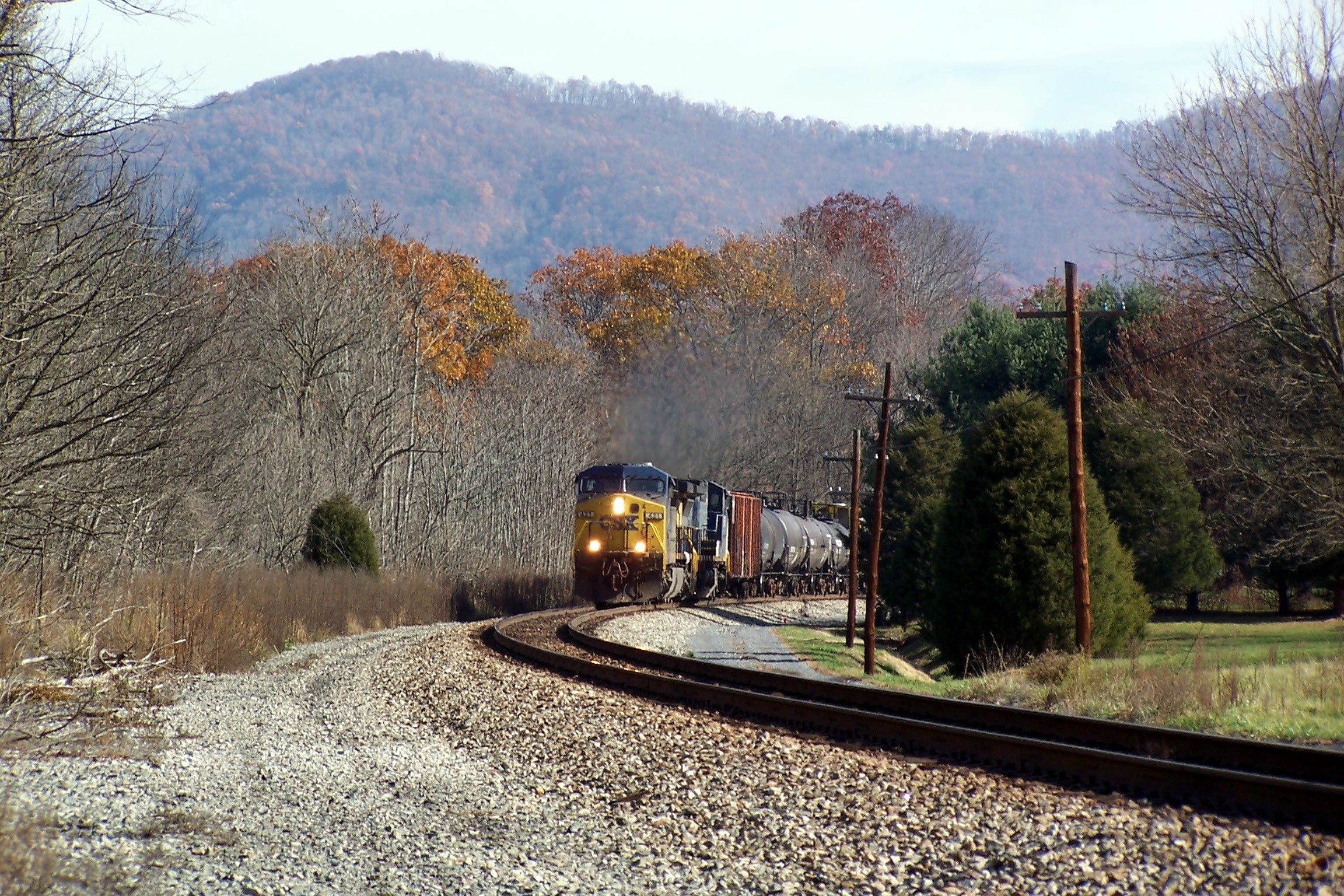
- A CSX freight train passes through Pence Springs in 2007.

- Location within West Virginia Location within the United States
- Coordinates: 37°40′41″N 80°43′30″W
- Country: United States
- State: West Virginia
- County: Summers
- Elevation: 1,539 ft (469 m)
- Time zone: UTC-5 (Eastern (EST))
  - Summer (DST): UTC-4 (EDT)
- Area codes: 304 & 681
- GNIS feature ID: 1555323

Pence Springs is an unincorporated community in Summers County, West Virginia, United States. It lies along the Greenbrier River to the east of the city of Hinton, the county seat of Summers County. Its elevation is 1,539 feet (469 m), and it is located at 37°40′41″N 80°43′30″W (37.6781762, -80.7250808). It had a post office with the ZIP code 24962 until it was closed in October 2011.

Once a hot spot for travelers, Pence Springs is now a quiet community home to a large flea market, which is held in the area that was once used as the bottling facility by Andrew Pence. The water that flows from the spring won awards at the St Louis Expo in 1904. In 1918, Pence built a three-story brick hotel above the spring. It attracted tourists and those wishing to visit the spring. The hotel was used as a state women's prison through the fifties, sixties and seventies. The old resort is currently being occupied by the Greenbrier Academy for Girls. The Pence Springs Hotel Historic District is a national historic district listed on the National Register of Historic Places in 1985.

Throughout the years several other hotels/hostels and boarding homes were built, none of which stand any longer. Across the Greenbrier River was the stock yards and the train station combination, that used to be as busy as nearby Hinton. Train service stopped in 1952.

There is a small grass landing strip known as the Hinton-Alderson Airport.

== Early history ==
Like most of the surrounding territories, the earliest inhabitants were the mound builders the Indians after the settlement of Jamestown by Captain John Smith, the Europeans who immigrated into what is now Summers County.

The first known white person to have settled in what is now Pence Springs was William Kincaid. The land on which he settled was later known as the Jesse Beard Plantation. On this land was the celebrated Pence Springs, then known only as a buffalo lick and called Buffalo Springs. For more than one hundred years it was a prime hunting destination for buffalo, elk and deer. In 1800 William Kincaid moved on west, leaving no trace of known descendants.

== Early settlers ==
As stated above, the earliest known settler of Pence Springs was William Kincaid, and there are no records to show who else may have settled there at the same time. Therefore, we have to use a land plantation grant to Colonel James Graham in 1758. Colonel Graham settled at Lowell, WV. One of his daughters Jane married David Jarrett and settled at buffalo Spring on land later known as the Mazi farm. A grandson of Colonel Graham settled on land which later became known as the Haynes place and a portion of it known first as the Nowlan and later the Tolley Place.

Jesse Beard, a native of Pocahontas County, owned a large tract of land in what is now Pence Springs. It was called the Beard Plantation which contained the famous spring. Beard died at about the close of the Civil war and is buried in the Beard/Nash Cemetery located behind the Buffalo School House. His lands were divided among his five children. A daughter Sarah who married Charles R. Hines, a native of Monroe County built a dwelling on the property she inherited from her father, this dwelling later became known as the Hines Boarding House.

James Madison Haynes, another native of Monroe County, moved to Greenbrier County in 1840. He then purchased the Samuel Graham property, located five miles (8 km) below Alderson on the Greenbrier River. This section of the property later became known as the Haynes Ferry. James Haynes died in 1858, leaving six children, his son William Haynes was elected a member of the state senate in 1871.

John Nowlan and Florance Graham Nowlan settled on Hungrets Creek in 1835. They were the grandparents of Mr. M.C. Nowlan of Pence Springs know to all as simply "Mac". His son Joseph Nowlan married Mary Keeny of Kanawha County in 1865. They purchased a part of the land owned by James M. Haynes. On this large tract of land, they constructed a large brick dwelling. The Nowlan's were very influential in the development of the community. In 1890 John was a republican candidate for commission of Summers County, in 1892 for sheriff. His son John Jr. Nowlan was the first postmaster of Pence Springs, at the time called Stock Yards.

Pence Springs owes its present name to Andrew P. Pence, a native of Monroe County, the grandson of Elizabeth Graham. Pence purchased the property containing the spring from the heirs of Jesse Beard. Through Pence's efforts, the old spring became one of the most famous places in the state of West Virginia and later recognized throughout the nation when its water won the silver medal at the Worlds Fair in St. Lewis in 1904. Mr. Pence Built a large hotel which could not accommodate all the guests so other smaller hotels were built, one of these was the Lahey Boarding House.

The Pence Springs Hotel burned in the early 1900s and the Pence Springs Company, consisting of Andrew Pence and Mr T. Davis built the Pence Springs Hotel which still stands today. This structure was used for the State Prison for Women from the 1940s to the 1980s.

== Early education ==
The first school was called The Mays School and was located in the vicinity of Valley Heights above the spring. There was the Kellan School, located near Lowell on the south side of the river. The Buffalo School was the next to be established; the original building was renovated in 2008 and stands below the Beard Nash Cemetery. Later came the Bush school. In the early 1900s these three schools were consolidated into the Pence Springs School; it was located on Route 3 in Pence Springs. It burned in 1941; following the fire school was held in the Lahey Boarding House until the new brick structure was completed in 1942 on the same site. The building still stands today.

== State Prison For Women ==
John William Johnson died December 5, 1930. For the next fourteen-year period, between 1930 and 1944, the Pence Springs Hotel property remained part of his estate. Efforts had been made by the trustees and executors, L.E. Johnson, Robert S. Johnson and William H. Sawyers, to sell the property; but they had been unable to secure a buyer. Then, on July 20, 1944, according to the deed of sale, "after diligent efforts extending over a period of years, finally obtained a buyer able, ready and willing to meet the price and terms they deem best for the Pence Springs Hotel property." The Pence Springs Resort was sold to the Hugh and Hall Adams Corporation, of Huntington for $27,500.00.

Arrangements for the purchase of the famous resort were made by John E. Campbell, of the Charleston law firm of Campbell, McClintic and James. This transaction involved the hotel property and all improvements, machinery, equipment, appliances, hotel furniture, furnishings used in connection with bottling and other plants, and all trademarks used in connection with the property and its water.

At the same time there had not been any announcement concerning the purchase of what plans the corporation had for the resort. An item in the Hinton Daily News, dated August 8, 1944, stated: "While no announcement has been made about plans for the resort, it was learned here that the purchasers are planning to spend considerable money to renovate the property with a view to opening it as a health resort for nine months of the year. Plastering and painting are expected to be done during the winter months with the expectation of opening the restort next springs."

A supplemental deed, dated October 16, 1944, was later made to the High and Hall Adams Corporation conveying "all rights, title and interest in and to the Pence Springs Hotel property." The Huntington Corporation's plans for the property never materialized.

During the following months the State Board of Control investigated the State Penitentiary at Moundsville, WV. Their investigation revealed that the state's present facilities for women inmates were inadequate and unsatisfactory. Women were being housed in cell blocks identical to those provided for male prisoners. Joseph Z. Terrell, President of the West Virginia State Board of Control, was the Warden at the Moundsville Prison. During that time, he had made several efforts to have the women moved from their cramped quarters in one wing of the penitentiary to a facility for women only, and now he was in a position to do something about it.

Terrell took his problem to the West Virginia Legislature and described the conditions that existed at Moundsville. He explained that "the only sensible solution would be the establishment of a State Prison for Women." Upon his recommendation, the 1945 West Virginia Legislature appropriated $203,000 for the establishment of a State Women's Prison. Terrell said that "he had been working for a prison for women for thirty years. It's one of the most constructive things the State of West Virginia has ever done."

The State Board of Control considered a dozen places," Terrell said "We thought about the Old Alderson college building in Alderson...we discarded them all. One day I happened to be driving by here [Pence Springs] on my way to Sweet Springs and it occurred to me that the hotel might be bought. My colleagues on the board warmed up to it immediately.

Subsequently, the State Board of Control obtained an option to purchase the hotel property for the sum of $45,000. Terrell brought the matter before the interim committee of the legislature, and on May 20, 1946, they recommended that the board exercise the option. The hotel facility seemed destined to be occupied by felons.

The following month the Board of Public Works released the funds appropriated by the 1945 Legislature for the purpose of "buying and remodeling the hotel." Terrell said that as soon as the building could be remodeled the 70 to 90 women who have been housed in the State Prison at Moundsville will be transferred to Pence Springs. On July 13, 1946, the hotel property and all the furniture presently located in the Pence Springs Hotel building was purchased through J.H. McClintic, Vice President and Purchasing Agent for the Hugh and Hall Adams Corporation. The Adams Corporation retained the adjacent property which contained the mineral spring and bottling plant along with the trade names and trademark used in connection with the hotel and its sulphur water.

Alexander Mahood, a Bluefield architect, was employed by the Board of Control to draw up plans for the necessary alterations needed to convert the former resort into a state penitentiary. Terrell said that "approximately $35,000 would be needed to install a new water and sewage system and up to $115,000 for other alterations including a new heating plant. We hope to have the property ready for occupancy by the first of the year."

Mahood was on the 81-acre (330,000 m^{2}) tract almost immediately. He owned his own architectural firm and was one of the state's foremost architects. Unfortunately the letter files kept by Mahood on this project have been destroyed.

Installation of the new water and sewage system began July 18, 1946. The work was being done for less than the original projected estimate of $35,000.00 by the Housby Brothers of Alderson, WV, who were under the supervision of J.E. Settle, a Charleston engineer. The first phase of this project was the installation of a water intake pump on the banks of the Greenbrier River, and a sewage disposal system. This was followed by the erection of a storage tank and a water treatment plant.

Mahood met with the State Board of Control on September 5, 1946, to discuss tentative plans for converting the former hotel building into a state penitentiary. The plans were drawn up the following week. Completion of the new water and sewage system was expected by the end of the month.
