= Dunloup Creek =

Stream in West Virginia, U.S.

Coordinates: 37°57′15″N 81°04′40″W

Dunloup Creek is a stream in the U.S. state of West Virginia.

Dunloup Creek most likely derives its name from a local family name.

== See also ==
- List of rivers of West Virginia
