= Central West Virginia Transit Authority =

Central West Virginia Transportation Authority
- Headquarters: 208 North 4th Street; Clarksburg, West Virginia
- Service area: Harrison County, West Virginia
- Service type: Bus
- Routes: 12
- Fuel type: Diesel
- Website: http://www.centrabus.com

The Central West Virginia Transit Authority, known by the moniker of Centra Bus, is a public transportation service located in Harrison County, West Virginia. It provides rural and inter-city bus and paratransit service to select communities within the county.

The agency was funded by the Transportation, Remuneration, Incentive Program from 1979 to 1980.

In 2020, the Department of Transportation Division of Transit purchased new vehicles for the system.

== Routes ==
The Central West Virginia Transit Authority operates the following routes.

- Adamson
- Anmoore
- Bridgeport
- Despard
- Hartland
- Nutter Fort
- Shinnson
- Stealy
- UHC/Charles Pointe
- West Milford
- Wolf Summit/Salem
