= Hinton–Alderson Airport =

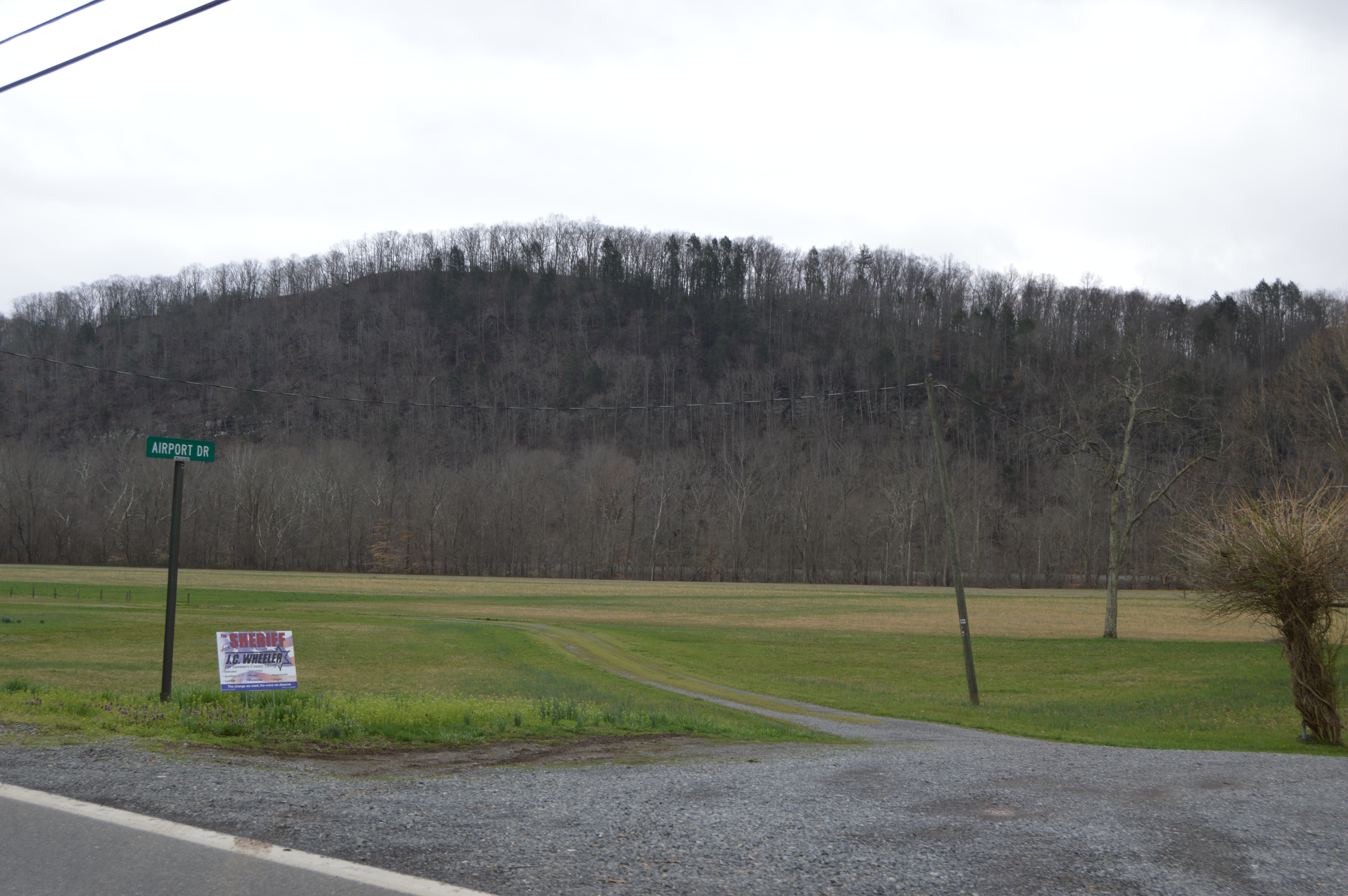
- IATA: none; ICAO: none; FAA LID: WV77

Summary
- Airport type: Private
- Owner: James Tolley Estate
- Operator: On Course Aviation LLC
- Location: Pence Springs, West Virginia
- Elevation AMSL: 1,520 ft (460 m)
- Coordinates: 37°40′46″N 080°42′37″W
- Website: https://oncourseaviationllc.com
- Interactive map of Hinton–Alderson Airport

Runways
Direction	Length		Surface
Direction	ft	m	Surface
10/28	2,700	820	Grass
- Source: Federal Aviation Administration

Hinton–Alderson Airport (FAA LID: WV77) is a private-use airport located in Pence Springs, West Virginia, between the larger communities of Hinton and Alderson. The airport is privately owned by James Tolley Estate and operated by On Course Aviation LLC.

== Facilities ==
Hinton–Alderson Airport covers an area of 47 acres (19 ha) at an elevation of 1,520 feet (460 m) above mean sea level. It has one grass runway designated 10/28 which measures 2,700 feet (820 m) x 25 feet (7.6 m).
