= Robert Newlon Field =

- IATA: none; ICAO: none; FAA LID: I41

Summary
- Airport type: Public
- Owner: Private
- Serves: Huntington–Ashland metropolitan area
- Location: Huntington, West Virginia
- Elevation AMSL: 550 ft / 168 m
- Coordinates: 38°27′25.3040″N 082°18′49.5360″W
- Interactive map of Robert Newlon Field

Runways
| Direction | Length | | Surface |
| Direction | ft | m | Surface |
|---|---|---|---|
| 2/20 | 2,300 | 701 | Turf |
- Source: Federal Aviation Administration

Herron Airport (FAA LID: 7G1) is a privately owned airport in Huntington, West Virginia, United States, part of the Huntington–Ashland metropolitan area. It was opened in February 1972, and named after Robert Newlon.

== See also ==
- List of airports in West Virginia
- Transportation in Huntington, West Virginia
