= Boggs Field =

- IATA: none; ICAO: KUSW; FAA LID: USW

Summary
- Airport type: Public use
- Owner: Boggs Aviation, LLC
- Serves: Spencer, West Virginia
- Elevation AMSL: 928 ft (283 m)
- Coordinates: 38°49′26″N 081°20′56″W

Map
- Location of airport in West Virginia USW (the United States)

Runways
Direction	Length		Surface
Direction	ft	m	Surface
10/28	4,549	1,387	Asphalt

Statistics (2022)
- Aircraft operations (year ending 7/7/2022): 3,100
- Based aircraft: 15
- Source: Federal Aviation Administration

Boggs Field (ICAO: KUSW, FAA LID: USW, formerly 14P) is a privately owned, public use airport located one nautical mile (2 km) north of the central business district of Spencer, in Roane County, West Virginia, United States.

Although most U.S. airports use the same three-letter location identifier for the FAA and IATA, this airport is assigned USW by the FAA but has no designation from the IATA.

== Facilities and aircraft ==
Boggs Field covers an area of 177 acres (72 ha) at an elevation of 928 feet (283 m) above mean sea level. It has one runway designated 10/28 with an asphalt surface measuring 4,549 by 75 feet (1,387 x 23 m).

For the 12-month period ending July 7, 2022, the airport had 3,100 aircraft operations, an average of 59 per week: 97% general aviation and 3% military. At that time there were 15 aircraft based at this airport: 10 single-engine, 2 multi-engine, 1 jet, and 2 helicopter.

== See also ==
- List of airports in West Virginia
