= Greater Cumberland Regional Airport =

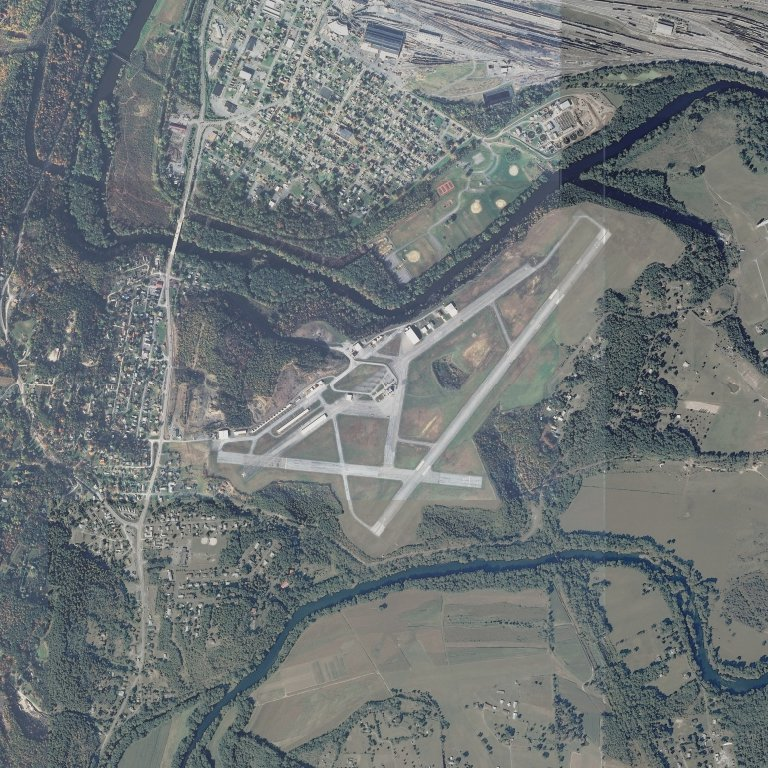
- USGS orthophoto
- IATA: CBE; ICAO: KCBE; FAA LID: CBE

Summary
- Airport type: Public
- Operator: Potomac Highlands Airport Authority
- Serves: Cumberland, Maryland, U.S.
- Location: 165 Terminal Loop, Wiley Ford, West Virginia, United States
- Elevation AMSL: 775 ft (236 m)
- Coordinates: 39°36′56″N 078°45′39″W
- Website: www.cbeairport.com
- Interactive map of Greater Cumberland Regional Airport

Runways
Direction	Length		Surface
Direction	ft	m	Surface
5/23	5,047	1,538	Asphalt
11/29	3,000	914	Asphalt

Statistics (2022)
- Aircraft operations (year ending 8/26/2022): 14,300
- Based aircraft: 58
- Source: Federal Aviation Administration

Greater Cumberland Regional Airport (IATA: CBE, ICAO: KCBE, FAA LID: CBE) is a public airport in the town of Wiley Ford in Mineral County, West Virginia, United States. It is two miles (3 km) south of Cumberland (population 21,518) in Allegany County, Maryland. Although the airport is in the Potomac Highlands of West Virginia, the FAA lists this as a Maryland airport. No major airlines fly here, with the nearest major airport being Johnstown–Cambria County Airport about 66 miles (106 km) away in Johnstown, Pennsylvania, as well as Hagerstown Regional Airport in Hagerstown, Maryland. In addition, it is situated in close proximity to Interstate 68 and U.S. Route 220, which both run through the nearby city of Cumberland.

On the second level of the airport terminal is the Cohongaronta Gallery (Cohongaronta being a Shawnee name for the Potomac River) with an array of displays on the history of the Potomac Highlands area. The centerpiece of the gallery is a 40% scale replica of the Wright Brothers 1903 Wright Flyer. A 70-foot-long (21 m) time line highlights dates and events for the Potomac Highlands region. The gallery is open to the public during terminal business hours.

== Facilities and aircraft ==
Greater Cumberland Regional Airport covers 314 acres (127 ha) and has two asphalt runways: 5/23, 5,047 x 150 ft (1,538 x 46 m) and 11/29, 3,000 x 150 ft (914 x 46 m).

In the year ending August 26, 2022, the airport had 14,300 aircraft operations, an average of 39 per day: 97% general aviation and 2% military. 58 aircraft were based at this airport: 45 single engine, 5 gliders, 4 multi-engine, 1 jet and 3 helicopter.

== Racing ==
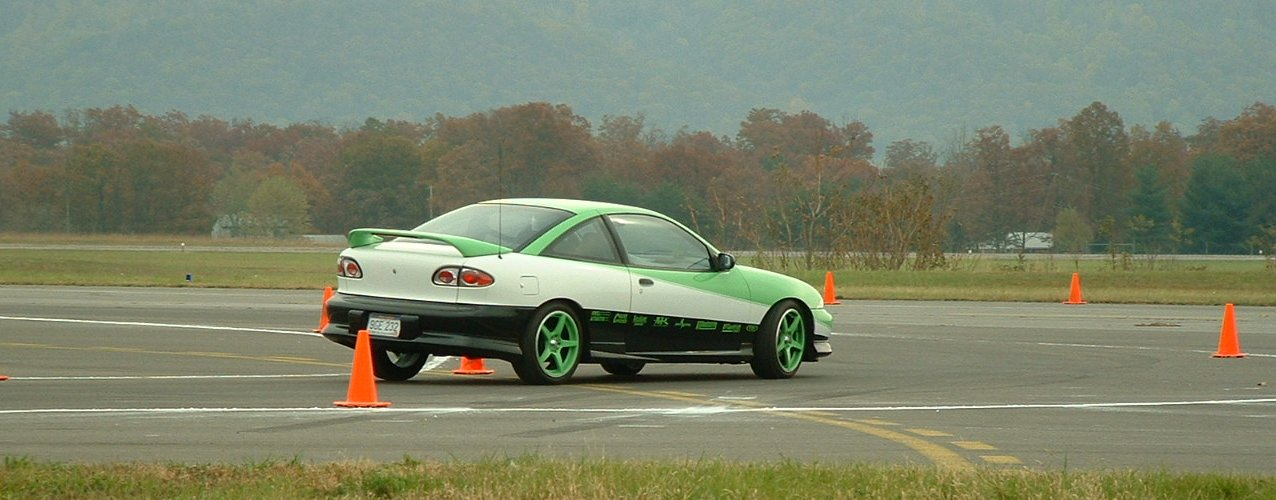
Pumpkin Carve Autocross, October 25, 2003

The Cumberland Greater Regional Airport was used for a 1.6-mile (2.6 km) airport course run in Wiley Ford, West Virginia (just south of Cumberland, Maryland) in the 1950s and 1960s.

Currently National Road Autosport holds autocross events at the airport on a monthly basis.

== History ==
Cumberland Airlines began service in 1969 with commuter flights from Cumberland to Baltimore and Pittsburgh. The Pittsburgh flights would later stop at Latrobe, Pennsylvania and the Baltimore flights continued through to the Ronald Reagan Washington National Airport. Piper PA-31 Navajo and Beechcraft Model 99 aircraft were used. Service continued for over twenty years, ending in 1990.

US Airways Express, operated by Crown Airways, began flights between Cumberland and Pittsburgh on June 3, 1991. The US Airways Express operator was changed to Liberty Express in 1994, to Mesa Airlines in 1998, then to Air Midwest in 1999. US Airways Express discontinued the flights on September 8, 2001 because of a lack of demand; the decision to end the flights had been made before the September 11 attacks.

Boston-Maine Airways, operating as Pan Am Clipper Connection on behalf of Pan Am, began flights between Cumberland and Baltimore-Washington International Airport with a stop at Hagerstown Regional Airport starting in December 2001. British Aerospace Jetstream 31 aircraft were used. Due to lack of demand, the service ended in June 2003.

== See also ==
- List of airports in West Virginia
