= Fairmont Municipal Airport (West Virginia) =

Fairmont Municipal Airport Frankman Field
- IATA: none; ICAO: none; FAA LID: 4G7

Summary
- Airport type: Public
- Owner: Fairmont-Marion County Regional Airport Authority
- Serves: Fairmont, West Virginia
- Elevation AMSL: 1,029 ft (314 m)
- Coordinates: 39°26′52″N 080°10′03″W

Map
- Location of airport in West Virginia

Runways
Direction	Length		Surface
Direction	ft	m	Surface
5/23	3,194	974	Asphalt

Statistics (2008)
- Aircraft operations: 7,900
- Based aircraft: 30
- Source: Federal Aviation Administration

Fairmont Municipal Airport (FAA LID: 4G7), also known as Frankman Field, is a public use airport located two nautical miles (4 km) southwest of the central business district of Fairmont, a city in Marion County, West Virginia, United States. It is owned by the Fairmont-Marion County Regional Airport Authority. This airport is included in the National Plan of Integrated Airport Systems for 2011–2015, which categorized it as a general aviation facility.

== Facilities and aircraft ==
Fairmont Municipal Airport covers an area of 20 acres (8 ha) at an elevation of 1,029 feet (314 m) above mean sea level. It has one runway designated 5/23 with an asphalt surface measuring 2,965 by 75 feet (904 x 23 m).

For the 12-month period ending July 2, 2008, the airport had 7,900 aircraft operations, an average of 21 per day: 94% general aviation and 6% military. At that time there were 30 aircraft based at this airport: 90% single-engine and 10% multi-engine.

== See also ==
- List of airports in West Virginia
