= State Transport Authority =

State Transport Authority may refer to:

- State Transport Authority (South Australia)
- State Transport Authority (Victoria)

== See also ==
- State Transit Authority, New South Wales
