= Southern West Virginia Regional Airport =

- IATA: none; ICAO: KEBD; FAA LID: EBD

Summary
- Airport type: Public
- Owner: Mingo County Airport Authority
- Serves: Williamson, West Virginia
- Location: Varney, West Virginia
- Elevation AMSL: 1,883 ft / 574 m
- Coordinates: 37°40′54″N 082°07′19″W

Map
- Location of airport in West Virginia

Runways
Direction	Length		Surface
Direction	ft	m	Surface
8/26	5,001	1,524	Asphalt

Statistics (2020)
- Aircraft operations (year ending 8/27/2020): 150
- Based aircraft (2024): 9
- Source: Federal Aviation Administration

Southern West Virginia Regional Airport (ICAO: KEBD, FAA LID: EBD), formerly known as Appalachian Regional Airport, is a public use airport located eight nautical miles (9 mi, 15 km) east of the central business district of Williamson, a city in Mingo County, West Virginia, United States. It is owned by the Mingo County Airport Authority. The airport was built on a reclaimed mine site near Varney, West Virginia, and opened in 2012.

This airport is included in the National Plan of Integrated Airport Systems for 2011–2015, which categorized it as a general aviation facility. Although most U.S. airports use the same three-letter location identifier for the FAA and IATA, this airport is assigned EBD by the FAA, but has no designation from the IATA (which assigned EBD to El Obeid Airport in El Obeid, Sudan).

== Facilities and aircraft ==
Southern West Virginia Regional Airport covers an area of 400 acres (162 ha) at an elevation of 1,883 feet (574 m) above mean sea level. It has one runway designated 8/26 with an asphalt surface measuring 5,001 by 75 feet (1,524 x 23 m).

For the 12-month period ending August 27, 2020, the airport had 150 general aviation aircraft operations, an average of 13 per month.

== See also ==
- List of airports in West Virginia
- Mingo County Airport (FAA LID: 4I0), located at 37°41′15″N 082°15′40″W
