= Logan County Airport (West Virginia) =

Coordinates: 37°51′20″N 081°54′57″W

- IATA: none; ICAO: none; FAA LID: 6L4

Summary
- Airport type: Public
- Owner: Logan County Airport Authority
- Serves: Logan, West Virginia
- Elevation AMSL: 1,667 ft / 508 m
- Interactive map of Logan County Airport

Runways
Direction	Length		Surface
Direction	ft	m	Surface
6/24	3,605	1,099	Asphalt

Statistics (2023)
- Aircraft operations (year ending 7/10/2023): 6,300
- Source: Federal Aviation Administration

Logan County Airport (FAA LID: 6L4) is five miles east of Logan, in Logan County, West Virginia. It is owned by the Logan County Airport Authority.

== Facilities ==
Logan County Airport covers 200 acres (81 ha); its one runway, 6/24, is 3,605 x 75 ft (1,099 x 23 m) asphalt. In the year ending July 10, 2023, the airport had 6,300 aircraft operations, average 121 per week, 96% general aviation and 5% military.

== See also ==
- List of airports in West Virginia
