= Welch Municipal Airport =

- IATA: none; ICAO: none; FAA LID: I25

Summary
- Airport type: Public
- Owner: City of Welch
- Serves: Welch, West Virginia
- Elevation AMSL: 2,118 ft / 646 m
- Coordinates: 37°25′00″N 081°31′44″W

Map
- Location of Welch Municipal Airport in West Virginia I25 (the United States)

Runways
Direction	Length		Surface
Direction	ft	m	Surface
9/27	2,695	821	Asphalt

Statistics (2009)
- Aircraft operations: 65
- Based aircraft: 2
- Source: Federal Aviation Administration

Welch Municipal Airport (FAA LID: I25) was a city-owned, public-use airport located 3 miles (4.8 km) southeast of the central business district of Welch, a city in McDowell County, West Virginia, United States.

== Facilities and aircraft ==
Welch Municipal Airport covered an area of 65 acres (26 ha) at an elevation of 2,118 feet (646 m) above mean sea level. It had one runway designated 9/27 with an asphalt surface measuring 2,695 by 50 ft (821 x 15 m).

During the 12-month period ending December 31, 2009, the airport had 65 aircraft operations: 92% general aviation and 8% military. At that time there were two single-engine aircraft based at this airport.

This airport has been closed since around 2013. The nearest active airport is Kee Field near Windom, West Virginia.

== See also ==
- List of airports in West Virginia
