= Logan Field =

Logan Field may refer to:

== Airports ==
- Logan Field (Alabama), an airport serving Samson, Alabama, United States
- Logan Field (Maryland), a former airport in Baltimore, Maryland, United States
- Logan International Airport, serving Boston, Massachusetts, United States

== Other uses ==
- Logan Field, the softball field of the Seattle Redhawks of Seattle University, Washington state, US
- Logan Field (actor), actor in A Hobo's Christmas
