= Intelligent Transit =

Joint venture bus service

- Founded: 2009
- Defunct: 2015
- Service type: commuter express bus service
- Alliance: Tri-State Transit Authority and Kanawha Valley Regional Transportation Authority
- Routes: 1
- Website: ridesmartwv.com

Intelligent Transit (iT) was a joint venture bus service of the Tri-State Transit Authority and the Kanawha Valley Regional Transportation Authority system, which operated a twice-per-day bus link between downtown Huntington, West Virginia, and downtown Charleston, West Virginia, with stops at the Marshall University main campus, the Teays Valley suburbs, and at the West Virginia State Capitol Building. Due to expired grants, declining gas prices, and reduced ridership, a decision was made to cease operation of the Intelligent Transit on August 28, 2015.

== Park and Ride Lots ==
- Huntington Mall (I-64 Exit 20B)
- Milton (I-64 Exit 28)
- Crooked Creek (I-64 Exit 40)
