= Upshur County Regional Airport =

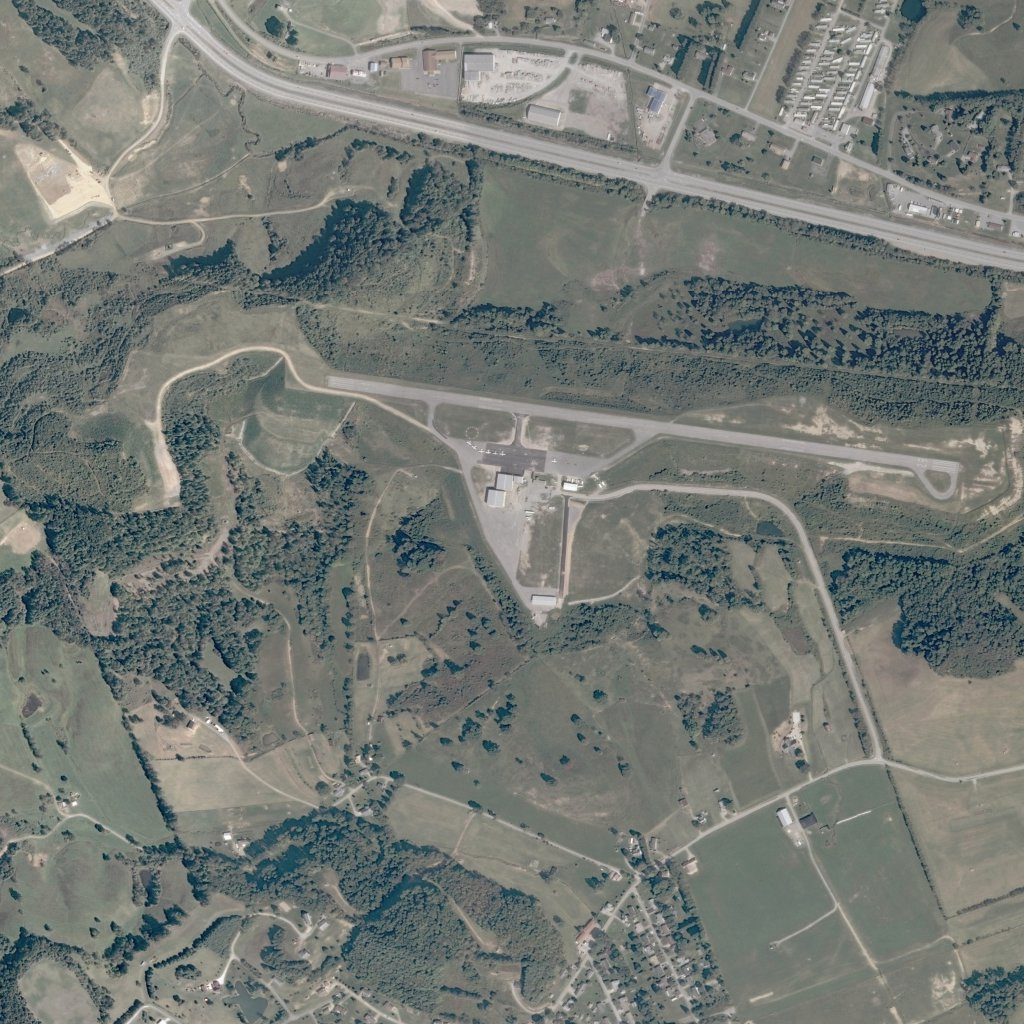
- USGS orthophoto
- IATA: none; ICAO: none; LID: W22

Summary
- Airport type: Public
- Owner: Buckhannon-Upshur; Airport Authority
- Serves: Upshur County West Virginia; Lewis County, West Virginia
- Location: 630 Airport Road, Upshur County, West Virginia, United States
- Opened: May 1998
- Time zone: GMT-5 (UTC-5)
- Elevation AMSL: 1,635.1 ft / 498.4 m
- Coordinates: 39°00′03″N 080°16′37″W Location of Upshur County Regional Airport W22 (West Virginia)
- Website: www.flyw22.com

Map
- Interactive map of Upshur County Regional Airport

Runways
Direction	Length		Surface
Direction	ft	m	Surface
11/29	4,201	1,280	Asphalt
- Source: AirNav, West Virginia Department of Transportation

Upshur County Regional Airport (FAA LID: W22) is a regional, public-use airport approximately 2 nautical miles outside the town of Buckhannon, Upshur County, in the United States. It lies directly along U.S. Route 48, and is also in close proximity to Interstate 79, which runs through neighboring Lewis County. In addition, it is close to U.S. Route 119, which also runs through the county in which the airport is based.

The airport was activated in May 1998, replacing a landing strip that had been in place before then, and has served as a general aviation facility ever since.

== History ==
Prior to the activation of the airport, the landing strip was used by West Virginia Wesleyan College as a pre-flight training facility for cadets during World War II. The airport was built on top of that very same landing strip, and was officially opened to the public during May 1998.

The airport currently works to accommodate a wide variety of aviation-based services throughout the entire region, including flights from the Civil Air Patrol, activities such as land surveying, as well as the transportation of mail and cargo by air. Additionally, the presence of the airport has become essential to the economy of the surrounding areas in recent years, creating over 10,000 jobs while also bringing other economic benefits.

== Facilities ==
The airport is located at an elevation of approximately 1,635 feet (roughly 498 meters). It currently has a single runway: 11/29, which is 4,201 x 75 ft. (1280 x 23 meters). It also has no control tower, and in the 12 months preceding July 13, 2021, had successfully conducted 10,000 local operations.
