= Ohio Valley and Eastern Ohio Regional Transportation Authority =

Ohio Valley and Eastern Ohio Regional Transit Authority
- Headquarters: 21 South Huron Street; Wheeling, West Virginia
- Service area: Ohio and Marshall Counties in West Virginia; Jefferson and Belmont Counties in Ohio
- Service type: Bus
- Routes: 11
- Fuel type: Diesel
- Website: http://www.ovrta.org

Ohio Valley and Eastern Ohio Regional Transit Authority is the provider of public transportation located in Wheeling, West Virginia and the surrounding area. The company is split into two divisions, the OVRTA, which provides seven routes on the West Virginia side of metro area, and the EORTA, which features four routes for the Ohio communities.

== Routes ==
All routes operate Monday through Saturday and depart from Downtown Wheeling.

=== OVRTA Division ===
- 1 Warwood- to Warwood
- 2 McMechen- to McMechen via Benwood
- 3 Elm Grove/Highlands- to Highlands Mall via Woodsdale, Edgewood, and Elm Grove
- 4 Mt. DeChantal- to Wheeling Medical Park via Woodsdale, Edgewood, and Wheeling Jesuit University
- 5 Mozart/Bethlehem- to Bethlehem via Mozart and Mt. Olivet
- 6 North Park/Wheeling Heights- to North Park via Wheeling Heights
- 7 Wheeling Island- to Wheeling Island

=== EORTA Division ===
- 8 Blaine/Mall- to Ohio Valley Mall via Bridgeport, Brookside, Lansing, and Blaine
- 9 Shadyside- to Shadyside via Bridgeport and Bellaire
- 10 Martins Ferry/Yorkville- to Yorkville via Bridgeport and Martins Ferry
- 11 Martins Ferry/Rayland- to Rayland via Bridgeport, Martins Ferry, Yorkville, and Tiltonsville
