= Tri-State Transit Authority =

- Headquarters: Huntington, West Virginia
- Service type: bus service, paratransit, express bus service
- Website: tta-wv.com

The Tri-State Transit Authority (TTA) is the city bus system in Huntington, West Virginia, and Ironton, Ohio, as well as its suburbs. Its buses range, on the West Virginia side from 21st Street in Kenova, West Virginia to Milton, West Virginia, about 20 miles to the east. On the Ohio side the buses range from downtown Ironton to the Huntington suburb of Proctorville, Ohio, which is also a range of about 20 miles.

Interchange buses provide links between Huntington and Chesapeake, Ohio, and between Ironton and Ashland, Kentucky, where transfers are available to the Ashland Bus System (ABS). However, the system does not interchange between the TTA and ABS in Ceredo, West Virginia, even though the buses pass within a few blocks of each other.

The TTA was involved in a joint venture with the Charleston, West Virginia-based Kanawha Valley Regional Transportation Authority bus system called Intelligent Transit which linked downtown Huntington to Charleston via bus. The service ceased on August 28, 2015, due to low ridership and lower gas prices compared to 2012.

All buses begin and end at the old Greyhound Bus Depot in downtown Huntington, which is now known as the TTA Center. Coordinates: 38°25′18″N 82°26′14″W

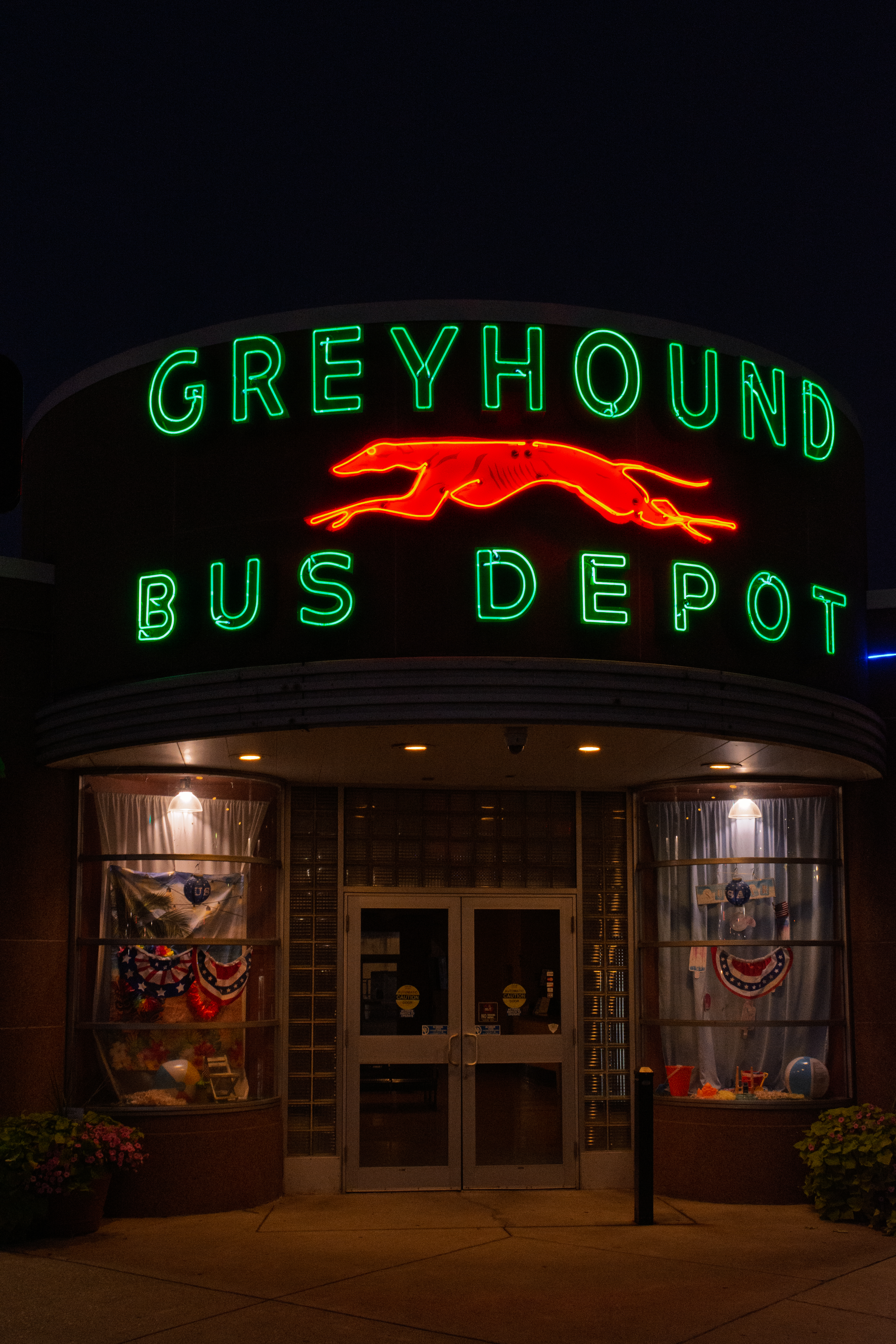
The neon sign for the former Greyhound Bus Depot in Huntington, West Virginia, is home to the TTA Center.

== Routes ==
TTA bus services operate on Monday to Saturday between 6:00 a.m. and 11:15 p.m. except for the Marshall Shuttle Evening Service.

| No. | Service | Notes |
|---|---|---|
| 1 | Ceredo/Kenova | to 21st Street in Kenova |
| 2 | Vo-Tech Center/Huntington Hospital/Prestera Center | to Eastern Heights |
| 3 | Third Avenue | to Lesage |
| 4 | 9th & 11th Avenue | to Huntington Plaza |
| 5 | Walnut Hills | to Pea Ridge |
| 6 | Madison Avenue | to Camden Park |
| 7 | Barboursville | to Huntington Mall |
| 8 | Hal Greer/John Marshall Medical Center/Pullman Square | to Infocision |
| 9 | Milton | to Culloden |
| 10 | Marshall Shuttle | 7:30 AM–4:20 PM service (Saturday service begins at 3:00 PM) |
| 10.1 | Marshall Shuttle Evening Service | 5:00 PM–12:00 AM service Monday-Thursday; 5:00 PM–3:00 AM Friday and Saturday |
| 11 | Burlington Walmart, Ironton Transit Cafe, Ashland Depot, Ceredo Plaza | |
| 12 | Ceredo Plaza, Ashland Bus Depot, Ironton Transit Cafe, Burlington Walmart | |
| 13 | Pullman Square, Chesapeake Community Center, Ohio University, Rome, St. Mary's Hospital, Marshall University | |
| 14 | Pullman Square, Chesapeake, Burlington, Wal-Mart | |
| 20 | PM South | 7:15-11:15 PM service |
| 30 | PM North | 7:15-11:15 PM service |
| 40 | PM West | 7:15-11:15 PM service |

== See also ==
- Huntington station
- List of bus transit systems in the United States
- Transportation in Huntington, West Virginia
