= Plug-in electric vehicles in West Virginia =

As of 2020, about 0.45% of all new vehicle sales in West Virginia were electric.

== Government policy ==
Initially, the state government offered tax rebates of up to $7,500 for electric vehicle purchases, but this program ended in 2013. As of 2022, the state government does not offer any tax incentives.

In 2017, the state government introduced an annual registration fee of $200 for electric vehicles, and $100 for plug-in hybrid vehicles.

== Charging stations ==
As of May 2022, there were about 80 public charging stations in West Virginia. The state has six public DC charging station locations with 44 charging ports.

The Infrastructure Investment and Jobs Act, signed into law in November 2021, allocates US$45.7 million to charging stations in West Virginia.

== Public opinion ==
In a 2022 poll conducted by the West Virginia Department of Transportation, 59% of respondents supported switching their vehicles to electric, while 41% were opposed.
