= Robert Gulden =

American cave surveyor and cartographer

- Robert Gulden March 25, 2022
- Born: March 30, 1948; Starnberg, West Germany
- Died: November 30, 2022 (aged 74)
- Other name: Bob
- Occupations: Cave surveyor and cartographer
- Years active: 58
- Known for: Cave survey
- Notable work: Database of long and deep caves

Robert Gulden, nicknamed Bob, (March 30, 1948 – November 30, 2022, age 74) was a prominent cave surveyor and cartographer. From 1976 until his death, Gulden kept the world's best-known database of long and deep caves.

== Early life ==
Gulden was born on March 30, 1948, in Starnberg, West Germany, to Irma and Edgar Walt Gulden. He began caving in 1964 while living in Okinawa, Japan.

== Career ==
Gulden joined the National Speleological Society in 1971. He began keeping the database for which he was best known in 1976, while he was helping to survey the Friars Hole Cave System in West Virginia. He also helped explore and map Great Onyx Cave at Mammoth Cave National Park in Kentucky, Gap Cave in Cumberland Gap National Historical Park in Virginia, and Siler's Cave in West Virginia.

He belonged to a caving club called the Gangsta Mappers, a group of "guerrilla cartographers who remap previously explored caves, but with more care and in greater detail", the New York Times reported in 2004.

In March 2022, Gulden was presented with the Karst Award, given annually to an outstanding member of the cave and karst field by the Karst Waters Institute.

== Death ==
Gulden died in his sleep on November 30, 2022. Bob's wife Janice Louise preceded him in death.

== Books ==
- Caves of the Eastern Panhandle of West Virginia, co-written with Mark J. Johnsson. Published 1984 by the West Virginia Speleological Survey.

== See also ==
- List of longest caves in the United States
