= Lock Haven Formation =

Geologic formation in Pennsylvania, United States

- Stratigraphic range: Devonian
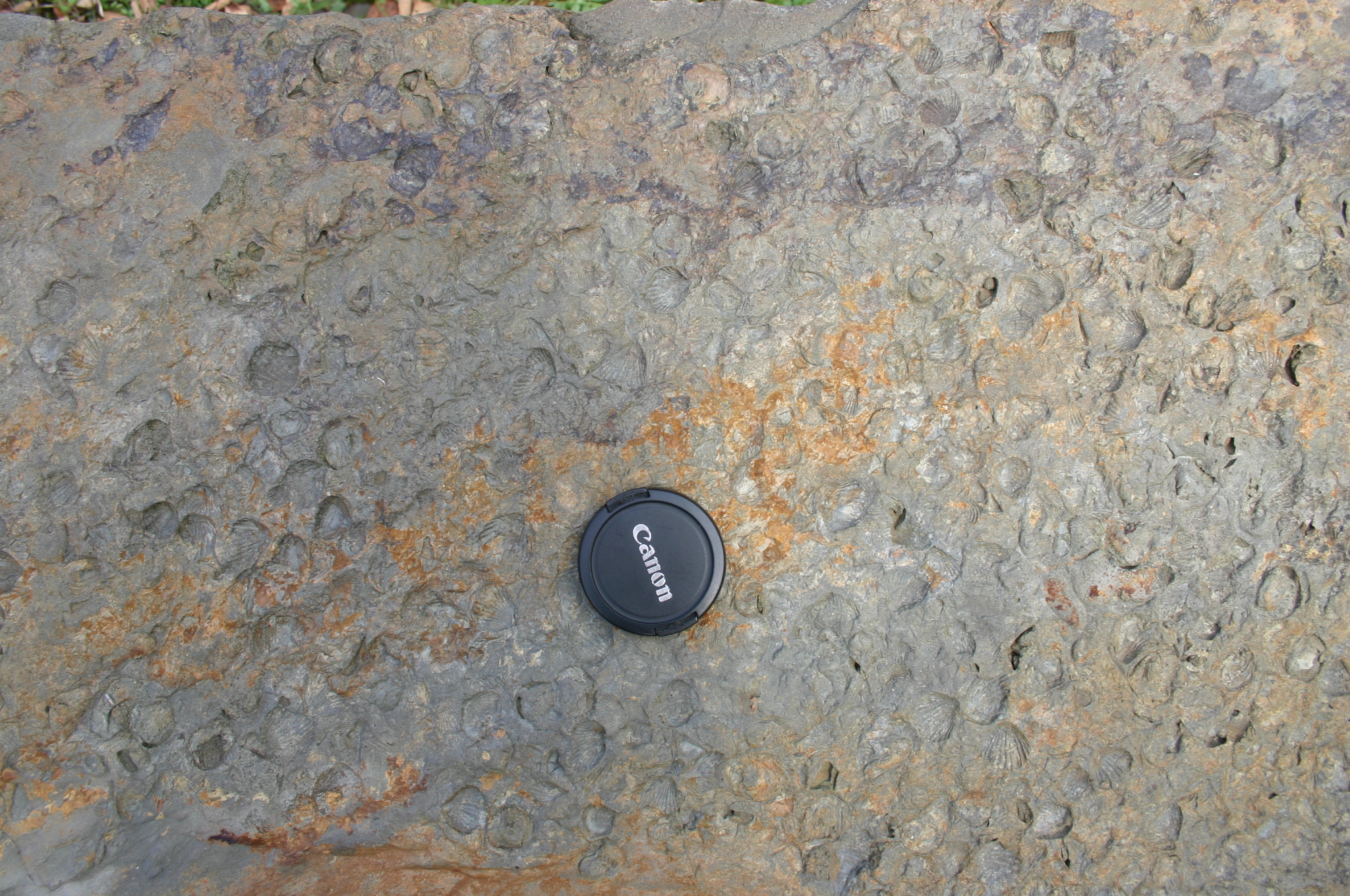
- Brachiopod casts in the Lock Haven, Leberfinger Quarry, Sullivan County, PA
- Type: sedimentary
- Unit of: Susquehanna Group
- Sub-units: lower shaly member, upper sandy member, Minnehaha Springs Member
- Underlies: Catskill Formation
- Overlies: Brallier Formation

Lithology
- Primary: siltstone, shale, sandstone
- Other: conglomerate

Location
- Region: Appalachian Mountains
- Country: United States
- Extent: Pennsylvania

Type section
- Named for: Lock Haven, Pennsylvania
- Named by: Faill and Wells, 1977

The Lock Haven Formation is a Devonian mapped bedrock unit in Pennsylvania, in the Appalachian Mountains of the United States.

== Description ==
The Lock Haven is gray to green-brown sandstone, siltstone, and shale and is over 400 million years old. It is located in northcentral Pennsylvania.

=== Stratigraphy ===
The Lock Haven may underlie various members of the Catskill Formation, although it may be a lateral equivalent of the Sherman Creek or Irish Valley Members of the Catskill. It is also a lateral equivalent of the Foreknobs Formation and underlying Scherr Formation. The Brallier Formation usually underlies the Lock Haven.

The Minnehaha Springs Member (originally proposed as a member of the Scherr Formation) is a "clastic bundle" consisting of interbedded medium gray siltstone and olive gray shale with some grayish-red siltstone and shale and some sandstone. It is interpreted as turbidites. This member is proposed to define the base of the Lock Haven Formation.

=== Notable Exposures ===
- Pine Creek Gorge
- Leberfinger Quarry, near Forksville in Sullivan County, Pennsylvania. Fossils at this location include Brachiopods and carbonized plant fossils, while trace fossils include Cruziana, Arenicolites, and Rhizocorallium.

== See also ==
- Geology of Pennsylvania
