= List of longest caves in the United States =

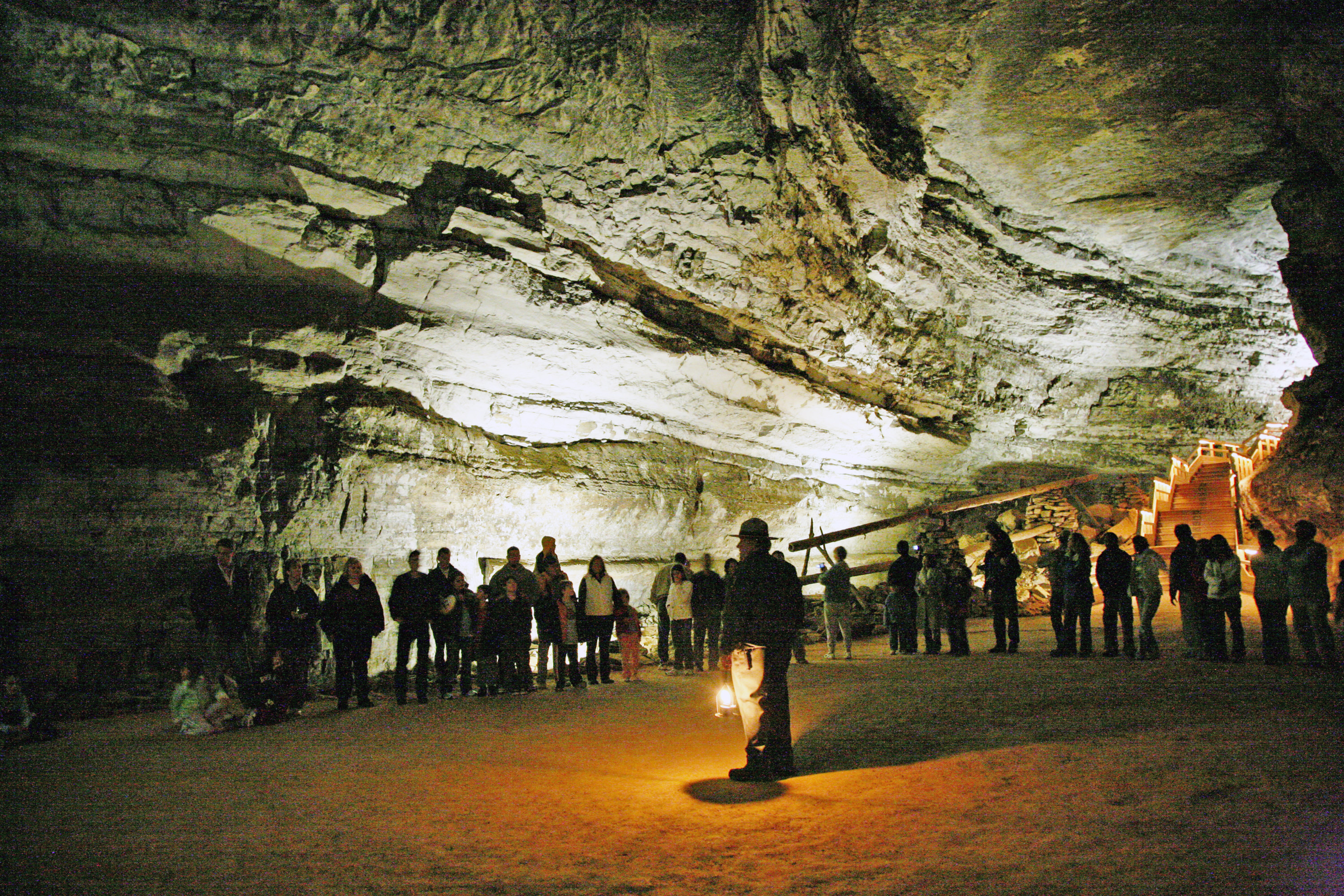
Mammoth Cave, the longest known cave system in the world

The following is a list of the longest caves in the United States per length (over 50 kilometres or 30 miles) of documented passageways. Many passageways are still being discovered; this list is based on the latest verifiable data. Some caves and cave systems are partially accessible to the general public. Other caves have restricted access; restrictions may include limiting access to experienced spelunkers or scientific research teams.

#	System	Length	Location	Coordinates	Associated parks, protected areas	Access
1	Mammoth Cave	685.6 km (426.0 mi)	near Brownsville, Kentucky	37.18758°N 86.10357°W	Mammoth Cave National Park, also a World Heritage Site and International Biosphere Reserve. Longest cave in the world.	Some public access
2	Jewel Cave	354.86 km (220.5 mi)	near Custer, South Dakota	43.72944°N 103.82944°W	Jewel Cave National Monument	Some public access
3	Wind Cave	270.498 km (168.1 mi)	near Hot Springs, South Dakota	43.55804°N 103.47955°W	Wind Cave National Park	Some public access
4	Lechuguilla Cave	244.8 km (152.1 mi)	near Carlsbad, New Mexico	32.1906420°N 104.5033091°W	Carlsbad Caverns National Park	Restricted access, requires authorization
5	Fisher Ridge Cave System	215.908 km (134.2 mi)	near Brownsville, Kentucky	37.1873°N 85.9751°W	partly within Mammoth Cave National Park	
6	Helms Deep Cave	119.896 km (74.50 mi)	Perry County, Tennessee	35.566667°N 87.683333°W	None.Entrances are on private property.	Restricted access, requires authorization
7	Great Savannah Cave System,(Maxwelton Sink Cave-McClung Cave)	88.530 km (55.01 mi)	near Greenbrier County, West Virginia	37.859703°N 80.406044°W	None. Entrances are on private property.	Restricted access, requires authorization
8	Fort Stanton Cave	90.493 km (56.23 mi)	near Lincoln County, New Mexico	33.506670°N 105.493610°W	Fort Stanton–Snowy River Cave National Conservation Area	Restricted access, requires authorization.
9	Friars Hole Cave System	84.587 km (52.56 mi)	near Renicks Valley, West Virginia	38.067203°N 80.329775°W	None. Multiple entrances, most on private property.	Some entrances closed. Some entrances require authorization. Some entrances accessible.
10	Binkley's Cave System	74.190 km (46.10 mi)	near Corydon, Indiana	38.1824995°N 86.1501717°W	None. Entrance on private property.	Some public access
11	Wakulla-Leon Sinks Cave System	72.1 km (44.80 mi)	Wakulla County, Florida	30.2354147°N 84.3028754°W	None. Underwater cave system.	
12	Whigpistle System	71.3 km (44.30 mi)	Edmonson County, Kentucky	37.1196°N 86.1362°W	none	
13	Hellhole	70.1 km (43.56 mi)	Germany Valley, West Virginia	38.771361°N 79.378103°W	None. Entrance is privately leased and owned. Home of two federally protected bat species.	No public access at any time. Restricted scientific access.
14	Double Bopper Cave	68.7 km (42.69 mi)	Coconino County, Arizona		Grand Canyon National Park	Restricted access, requires authorization
15	Blue Spring Cave	67.4 km (41.88 mi)	near Sparta, Tennessee	35.962811°N 85.385311°W	none	Restricted access, requires authorization
16	Kazumura Cave	65.5 km (40.70 mi)	Pahoa, Hawaii	19.518890°N 155.031110°W	None. Entrance on private property.	Some public access for fee.
17	Carlsbad Caverns	63.5 km (39.46 mi)	near Carlsbad, New Mexico	32.177057°N 104.441039°W	Carlsbad Caverns National Park	Public access.
18	Organ Cave	61.9 km (38.46 mi)	Greenbrier County, West Virginia	37.7181564°N 80.4362982°W	None. Entrances on private property.	Some entrances closed. Some entrances require authorization. Some entrances accessible.
19	Crevice Cave	50.2 km (31.19 mi)	Perry County, Missouri	37.7527°N 89.8749°W	none	

== See also ==
- List of caves
- List of longest caves
- List of deepest caves
