= Geology of West Virginia =

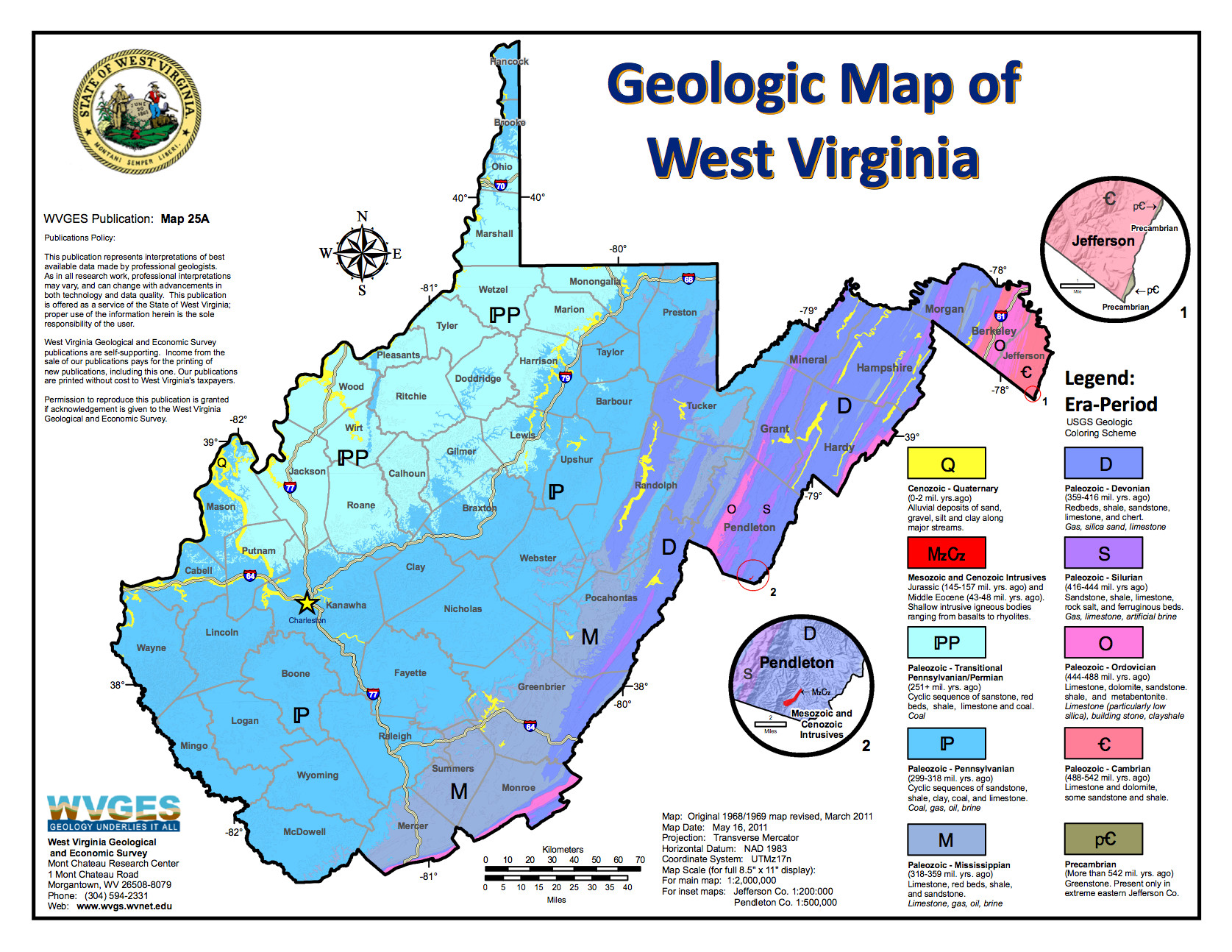
Geologic Map of West Virginia.

West Virginia's geologic history stretches back into the Precambrian, and includes several periods of mountain building and erosion. At times, much of what is now West Virginia was covered by swamps, marshlands, and shallow seas, accounting for the wide variety of sedimentary rocks found in the state, as well as its wealth of coal and natural gas deposits. West Virginia has had no active volcanism for hundreds of millions of years, and does not experience large earthquakes, although smaller tremors are associated with the Rome Trough, which passes through the western part of the state.

== Precambrian origins ==
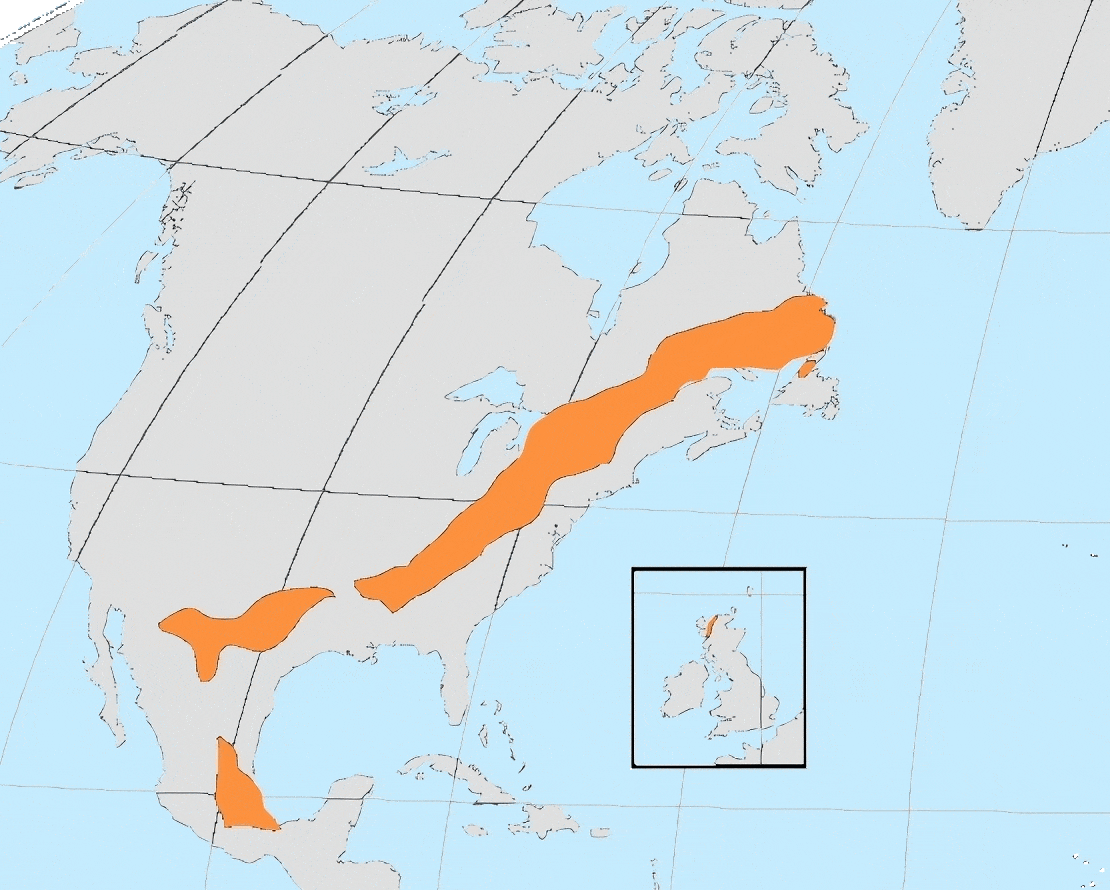
Extent (orange regions) of the Grenville orogeny, after Tollo et al. (2004) and Darabi (2004). This illustration shows mountain building regions, but Grenvillian basement rock extends all the way to the Atlantic Ocean.

The basement rock of West Virginia was formed during the Grenville orogeny, approximately 1,140 to 980 million years ago, when the land mass today known as Laurentia, the ancestral North American craton, collided with other land masses to produce the supercontinent known as Rodinia. The heat and pressure of this collision melted the existing rock, some of which was pushed down into the mantle, while a high chain of mountains formed on the surface. As these mountains eroded, the underlying layers of granite and gneiss were pushed upward by heavier mantle rocks, and exposed at the surface. This Grenvillian basement rock underlies substantially all of the Appalachian region, from the Ohio valley to the sea, and extends north and south into eastern Canada and Mexico, as well as a part of the Scottish highlands.

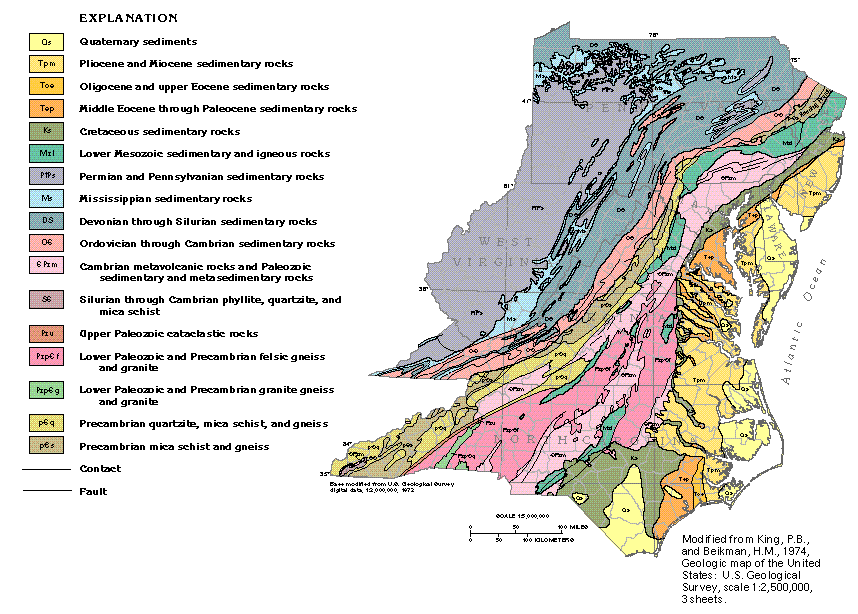
Geological map of the Mid-Atlantic states

Today, the crystalline igneous rocks of the Grenvillian basement form the core of the Blue Ridge Mountains, also known as the Pedlar formation, where they are exposed. To the west, they are hidden beneath the Valley and Ridge and Appalachian Plateau, while to the east they extend under the Piedmont, coastal plain, and continental shelf. Over hundreds of millions of years, erosion formed a layer of sediment known as the Swift Run formation, extending over substantially all of West Virginia. Although Rodinia began to break up between 850 and 750 million years ago, it was not until about 600 million years ago that the Iapetus Ocean began to open up between Laurentia and its neighbors along the region uplifted during the Grenville orogeny. At that time, the craton was rotated approximately 90° clockwise from its present orientation, and was located south of the equator. The rifting process thinned the crust and led to volcanic activity, resulting in a layer of basalt, today known as the Catoctin formation, burying the existing ridges and valleys.

Little of West Virginia's ancient history can be seen at the surface. Only in the extreme eastern panhandle is the Precambrian core of the Blue Ridge Mountains exposed. Except for intrusives, all of the rocks occurring above the Catoctin and Swift Run formations are of sedimentary origin, and most date to the Paleozoic Era.

== Paleozoic Era ==
By the Cambrian Period, approximately 541 to 485 million years ago, a shallow sea had spread westward over most of what is now West Virginia. Marine deposition took place throughout most of this and the succeeding Ordovician Period. During this total interval of about 370 million years, most of the rocks today exposed in Jefferson and eastern Berkeley counties and in scattered areas southwestward along the boundary were deposited. Rocks of the same age are found in abundance in the deep wells throughout the State. The Taconic orogeny near the end of Ordovician time formed a high mountainous area east of West Virginia. Near the end of Devonian time, the sea was rapidly retreating westward and the continental red beds of the Hampshire Formation were being deposited over most of the State. The last significant period of marine deposition was the Greenbrier Formation, predominantly limestone, approximately 330 million years ago. About 310 million years ago, the area of West Virginia was once again above sea level, but covered by vast areas of swamp. This condition prevailed for more than fifty million years, resulting in the deposition of thousands of feet of non-marine sandstone and shale, as well as the many important coal seams that we know today. The Appalachian Orogeny began roughly 270 to 225 million years ago, building the present-day Appalachian Mountains. Most of the state was uplifted, important deposition of sediments ceased, and a gradual process of erosion commenced.

== Details ==
The Taconic orogeny near the end of Ordovician time formed a high mountainous area east of West Virginia. These highlands formed the main source of sediments for the succeeding Silurian Period and part of the Devonian Period. Both clastics and carbonates were deposited in a mixed marine and nonmarine environment, with clastics predominating in the eastern part of the State. Evaporites were deposited in northern West Virginia in Late Silurian time.

During Middle and Late Devonian time the Acadian Orogeny, with the main uplift to the northeast, resulted in a further source for the predominantly clastic marine deposits of these epochs. However, near the end of Devonian time, the sea was rapidly retreating westward and the continental red beds of the Hampshire Formation were being deposited over most of the State.

The sea made one more important intrusion into West Virginia during Middle Mississippian time, approximately 330 million years ago, resulting in the deposition of the Greenbrier Formation, predominantly limestone, the last marine deposit of significance in the State.

At the close of Mississippian time, about 310 million years ago, West Virginia was essentially a land area, subject to erosion. Early in the succeeding Pennsylvanian Period, the area dropped to near sea level and for more than 50 million years continued to sink at about the same rate that deposition was taking place. Only occasionally and for very short periods of time did the area fall below sea level. Swamp conditions prevailed, resulting in the deposition of thousands of feet of nonmarine sandstone and shale and the many important coal seams that we know today.

During the Permian Period, roughly 270 to 225 million years ago, the Appalachian Orogeny began. West Virginia was uplifted, important deposition of sediments ceased, and erosion began taking place. Much folding and thrust faulting occurred, especially in the eastern part of the State. This orogeny played a major part in the formation of the Appalachian Mountains as we know them today. Never again has the sea invaded West Virginia.

Almost no sedimentary rock from the Mesozoic Era is present in West Virginia. In other parts of world, rocks of this age, which extended from 225 to 66 million years ago, contain the remains of countless species of dinosaurs and other reptiles; such fossils are virtually unknown in West Virginia. During the early part of the era, considerable igneous activity took place in neighboring states to the east. A few dikes of gabbro and other mafic rock from the Jurassic Period, 210 to 145 million years ago, are present in Pendleton and surrounding counties.

In the Cenozoic Era, which extended from 66 million years ago to present day, igneous activity was renewed in the eastern part of the State. Approximately 45 million years ago, a complex of dikes and sills with compositions ranging from basalt to rhyolite were intruded into the Paleozoic sedimentary rocks in the area in and around Pendleton County. These unusual igneous rocks are some of the youngest in eastern North America. Late in the Cenozoic Era, in fact extending to less than 100,000 years ago, glaciers covered the northern part of the North American continent, extending almost to the Northern Panhandle of West Virginia, but not into the State. Prior to the advance of these ice sheets, drainage of the Monongahela River was northward to the St. Lawrence River system. The ice sheet caused damming and a lake extended as far south as Weston. Important lake deposits, predominantly clay, were thus laid down in the Monongahela River basin. Drainage was diverted westward into the Ohio River system. Divergence of the New River system that formerly drained northwestward caused the deposition of similar deposits in the old Teays River channel between Charleston and Huntington. Except for recent alluvial deposits, there are no other known Cenozoic rocks.

The oldest evidences of life found in West Virginia occur in rocks about 600 million years old, in the Antietam Formation of Lower Cambrian age. However, in this formation they are abundant and of forms that had already developed through a substantial part of all evolution that has taken place during the history of the earth. Evidences of life in other parts of the earth are found in rocks at least 3 billion years old. Fossils are found in increasing abundance and increasing stages of evolutionary development in the rocks of all ages since earliest Cambrian time.

== See also ==
- Geography of West Virginia
