= West Virginia Speleological Survey =

The West Virginia Speleological Survey (WVaSS) is a speleological organization and ongoing cave survey program that has gathered information and published about West Virginia caves and karst since 1967.

WVaSS was founded by Roger Baroody who was motivated to continue the survey begun by William E. Davies (1917–1990) in his Caverns of West Virginia (1949, 1950, 1965). Davis’ book and its updates were published as part of the West Virginia Geological Survey series, but after 1965 it became apparent that no further updates would be forthcoming. Large quantities of new cave and karst data were becoming available and so the need for a dedicated survey program seemed evident.

== Organization and history ==
The WVaSS is a highly informal, voluntary, non-profit association of cavers and caving groups. In 1978, WVaSS became a Study Group of the National Speleological Society (NSS) and in 1987 was granted 501c3 tax exempt status by the Internal Revenue Service.

== Safeguards ==
For reasons of cave conservation and safety, it is the policy of WVaSS to sell bulletins only to NSS members and individuals and agencies doing karst research. Certain caves contain unique speleothems, rare forms of cave life, or have serious landowner-caver relations problems. For these caves, the WVaSS may refrain from publication.

== Publications ==
Beginning in 1971, the WVaSS has produced 19 publications (“bulletins”) to date. It has attempted to maintain a balance between bulletins that simply present cave surveys/descriptions (14 so far) and bulletins advancing specific karst research (5 so far). In aggregate, the 11 survey bulletins have provided descriptions of over 2175 caves in 14 West Virginia counties. The research survey bulletins include a master's thesis on cave development, a bibliography of West Virginia caves and karst, and bulletins on the invertebrate and vertebrate fauna of West Virginia caves.

=== WVaSS publications ===
An asterisk (*) indicates an out-of-print publication.

Bulletins

- BULLETIN 1* — Caves of Randolph County, by Doug Medville, 1971. 218 pages, over 200 caves described.
- BULLETIN 2* — Development of Solution Features Cloverlick Valley, Pocahontas County, by Eb Werner, 1972. 62 pages. A discussion of the geology and geomorphology of karst features in Cloverlick Valley.
- BULLETIN 3 — Index of the Literature Pertaining to West Virginia Caves and Karst, by Eb Werner, 1974. 155 pages.
- BULLETIN 4* — Caves of Monroe County, by John C. Hempel, 1975. 171 pages describing 210 caves.
- BULLETIN 5* — Caves of North Central West Virginia, by E. Ray & Mary Ellen Garton, 1976. 116 pages describing 111 caves in 7 counties (viz., Barbour, Harrison, Marion, Monongalia, Ohio, Preston, and Upshur).
- BULLETIN 6* — Caves and Karst Hydrology in Northern Pocahontas County, by Doug & Hazel Medville, 1976. 174 pages describing over 300 caves. See Bulletin 10.
- BULLETIN 7* — The Invertebrate Cave Fauna of West Virginia, by John R. Holsinger, Roger A. Baroody & David C. Culver, 1976. 86 pages.
- BULLETIN 8* — Caves of the Eastern Panhandle of West Virginia, by Robert Gulden & Mark Johnson, 1985. 135 pages describing 89 caves in 3 counties.
- BULLETIN 9* — Caves of the Organ Cave Plateau, Greenbrier County, West Virginia, edited by Paul J. Stevens, 1988. Over 70 pages devoted to Organ Cave, the second longest in West Virginia, 37+ miles. At 100 feet to the inch the map of the system covers 80 pages. Also included are descriptions of 50 other caves on the Organ Cave Plateau. 200 pages.
- BULLETIN 10 — Caves and Karst Hydrology of Southern Pocahontas County and the Upper Spring Creek Valley, by Gary D. Storrick, 1992. 220 pages, 428 caves including 43+ mile Friars Hole System. 100 maps, 30 photos, 30 fold-out maps including Friars Hole at 1"=160'. Companion volume to Bulletin 6.
- BULLETIN 11 — The Vertebrate Fauna of West Virginia Caves, by E. Ray Garton, Fredrick Grady & Steven D. Carey, 1993. 100 pages describing and listing the living vertebrates reported from WV caves. Lists over 550 records for 57 species in over 220 caves. 5 color plates, 3 B/W plates.
- BULLETIN 12 — The Caves and Karst of Buckeye Creek Basin, by George R. Dasher and William M. Balfour, 1994. 238 page, 80 photos, 4 color plates, 62 illustrations, 35 cave maps including 4 foldouts, with descriptions of 116 caves including the 5+ mile Buckeye Creek Cave System.
- BULLETIN 13 — Caves and Karst of Randolph, by Doug & Hazel Medville, 1995. Completely revised and updated to replace Bulletin 1. Describes 520 caves, 41 photos, with 150 maps, (11 foldout) including first ever full map of Simmons Mingo Cave, 252 pages.
- BULLETIN 14 — Caves of East-Central West Virginia--The Guidebook of the National Speleological Society’s 2000 Convention, Elkins, West Virginia, edited by George R. Dasher, May 2000. Contains 60+ cave descriptions plus maps including 20 large fold-out maps in separate map packet. Also includes interviews with well-known cavers of the region, detailed geology, hydrology, paleontology, biology and field trips. 300 pages.
- BULLETIN 15 — Caves and Karst of Pendleton County, by George Dasher, 2001. 404 pages describing 326 caves with 172 cave maps, 23 as fold outs, with 202 photos.
- BULLETIN 16 — The Invertebrate Cave Fauna of West Virginia, 2nd ed., by Daniel W. Fong, David C. Culver, Horton H. Hobbs III, and Tanja Pipan, 2007; 167 pages, 11 color photos, 42 color maps, and six tables; describes 88 species and three subspecies in 282 caves in 19 West Virginia counties.
- BULLETIN 17 — Caves and Karst of Grant County, West Virginia, by George Dasher, 2010. 120 pages describing 90 caves with 35 cave maps, with 91 photos.
- BULLETIN 18 — The Caves and Karst of Tucker County, by Doug McCarty & Brian Masney, 2011. 302 pages describing 304 caves and karst features, with 96 cave maps, and 155 photos, with a CD containing color versions of all maps and photos, including several maps too large for the book.
- BULLETIN 19 — The Caves and Karst of West Virginia, by George Dasher, 2012. The bulletin is 264 pages long, and contains descriptions of West Virginia's karst and limestones, summaries of the state's caves by river basins, and list of West Virginia's long caves, deep caves, deep pits, saltpeter caves, significant caves, karst springs, dye traces, VAR cave accidents, and reprints of the 2000 and 2012 NSS Convention geology field trips.
- Bulletin 20 — The Caves and Karst of the Culverson Creek Basin by Philip Lucas, William Balfour, and George Dasher. 2018. 336 pages, 364 caves, 208 photos, 80 maps. Included is a USB drive with the entire Bulletin in color plus other useful files. Describes the many caves in the Culverson Creek Basin of north-eastern Greenbrier County; includes a USB drive with the entire bulletin in color, plus other useful files. Black and white vs color editions available.
- BULLETIN 21 — The Caves and Karst of Mercer and Summers Counties, WV by Nick Schaer and George Dasher. 2018. 226 caves, 186 pages, 131 photos, 62 maps. Black and white vs color editions available.
- BULLETIN 22 — The Caves and Karst of Monroe County by George Dasher. 2019. 476 pages, 524 caves and springs, 143 maps, 242 photos, sections on bats and vertebrate fossils, 12 appendices. Black and white vs color editions available.
- BULLETIN 23 — The Caves and Karst of Hardy County by George Dasher; 2020; 194 pages, 70 caves and springs, 43 maps, 17 geological schematics, 185 photos, sections on bats and vertebrate fossils, nine appendices, and a 43-page geological field trip on Corridor H from Davis to Wardensville; Black and white vs color editions available.
- BULLETIN 24 — The Caves and Karst of Western Greenbrier County by Bill Balfour, Greg Springer, Mark Passerby, and George Dasher; 2020; 248 pages, 184 caves and springs, 41 cave maps, 24 geological schematics and other maps, 138 photos, 9 appendices, and a 58-page quad map of Zicafoose Blowhole; Black and white vs color editions available.
- BULLETIN 25 — The Caves and Karst of Pendleton County Volume One: Potomac River Valleys by George R. Dasher, 306, pages, 192 caves, 143 maps, 208 photos, 2020. Black and white vs color editions available.
- BULLETIN 26 — The Caves and Karst of Pendleton County Volume Two: Germany Valley by George R. Dasher, 328, pages, 321 caves, 122 maps, 104 photos, 2021. Black and white vs color editions available.
- BULLETIN 27 — The Saltpeter Caves of West Virginia by George Dasher, Ray Garton & Mary Ellen Garton; 2021, 300 pages, 62 caves, 78 maps, 91 photos, 10 appendices. Color
- BULLETIN 28 — The Caves and Karst of North-Central Greenbrier County, WV by William Balfour, Bert Ashbrook, Gregory S. Springer, & George Dasher; 2023, 198 pages, 214 caves, 57 maps, 106 photos.Color
- BULLETIN 29 — The Caves and Karst of Central Greenbrier County, WV by William Balfour, Gregory S. Springer, & George Dasher; 2024, 242 pages, 208 caves, 96 maps, 170 photos. Color

Monographs

- MONOGRAPH 1 — "Caves in the Richlands Area of Greenbrier County, West Virginia", edited by Bert Ashbrook, 1995. 48 caves are described in a 4-square-mile (10 km^{2}) area, with 25 figures, photos, tables & maps including 4 large foldouts, 37 pages.
- MONOGRAPH 2 — "Recent Spring Creek Area Dye Tracings, Greenbrier County, West Virginia", by George R. Dasher & Dr. Doug G. Boyer, 2000. Contains detailed analysis, significance and historical perspective of the karst springs of the Buckeye Creek, Culverson Creek and Spring Creek drainage basins. Maps, photos and illustrations. 28 pages.
- MONOGRAPH 3 — "The Cassell Cave Survey Project, Pocahontas County, West Virginia" by Robert Zimmerman, 2009. 60 pages, 17 photos, 27 figures, maps at 50 feet to the inch. Describes the history, exploration and geology of this 8.6 mile system and surrounding caves.
- MONOGRAPH 4 — "The Survey of Cass Cave, Pocahontas County, West Virginia" by Robert Zimmerman, cartography by Robert Zimmerman and Gregory S. Springer, 2011. Describes the history and geology of Cass Cave, including a map of the entire system. 23 map sheets, 1 profile sheet, 23 figures, 64 pages. OUT OF PRINT
- MONOGRAPH 5 — "Geology of Some Caves in Pendleton County, West Virginia" by Chrisopher S. Swezey, 2014. Describes the geology, etc. of Cave Mountain, Sinnett, Trout, New Trout, and Hamilton Caves. 60 pages, 5 maps, 7 geological schematics, and one graph.
- MONOGRAPH 6 — "A Convergence of Cave Men: The History of the Seneca Caverns Company" by Richard A. Lambert; 134 pages, 229 pictures, 13 maps

Miscellaneous

- Proceedings of the 1976 N.S.S. Annual Convention, Morgantown, WV edited by Eb Werner, 1977. 60 pages with 18 papers.
- Proceedings of the 1977 N.S.S. Annual Convention, Alpena, MI edited by Eb Werner, 1979. 90 pages with 16 papers.
- Caverns of West Virginia* by William E. Davies, 1965. 474 pages describing over 500 caves. Hard cover. Soft cover reprint, 1994.
- Caverns of West Virginia by William E. Davies, 1965 supplement. 72 pages describing 194 caves.
- Karst Hydrology Atlas of West Virginia by William K. Jones, 1997. Special Publication 4 of the Karst Waters Institute. 111 pages describing 22 aspects of the Hydrogeologic Setting in West Virginia including Karst Drainage Basins, Biological Significance of Karst, Land-use Planning for Karst Areas and the results of tracer tests in West Virginia. 11x14 format, dozens of photos, maps and charts.
- West Virginia Caver, Published every other month as official newsletter of the Charleston, ESSO, Monongahela, Monroe County Cavers, Mountain State, Parkersburg Area, Warsaw Underground, WV Association for Cave Studies, GROSS Grotto, and the WV University Student Grottos. Edited by George Dasher, each issue is generally 18-20 pages. 124 issues have been published as of 11/01.
- Hydrology of Limestone Karst in Greenbrier County, West Virginia (Bulletin 36) by William K. Jones, 1973. 55 pages describing several cave systems.
- Limestones of West Virginia by J.B. McCue, J.B. Luke & H.P. Woodward, 1939. 560 pages, hard cover.
- Springs of West Virginia by Paul H. Price, John B. McCue & Homer A. Hoskins, 1936. 146 pages describing the geology, history and chemistry of 176 springs in West Virginia.
- Springs of West Virginia 50th Anniversary Revised Edition by Jane S. McColloch, 1986. 493 pages describing the geology, history and chemistry of 1193 springs in West Virginia. All major karst springs included.
- Proceedings of the Fourth Conference on Karst Geology and Hydrology edited by H.W. Rauch & Eb Werner, 1974. 192 pages, 22 papers, 10 abstracts.
- Structural Contour Map on the Greenbrier Limestone in West Virginia by O.L. Haught, 1968. 35 X 38 inch map.
- Ground-water Hydrology of the Potomac River Basin in West Virginia by W.A. Hobba, E.A. Friel, J.K. Chrisholm, 1973. 31 X 45 inch map.
- Karst Subsidence and Linear Features Map of Greenbrier and Monroe Counties, West Virginia by P. Lessing, S.L. Dean, B.R. Kulander & J.H. Renalds, 1979. 32 X 58 inch map.
- Limestone Outcrops and Probable Areas Underlain by Rock Salt and Natural Brine in West Virginia. 8.5 X 11 inch map.
- WV Geological Survey County Geologic Reports and Geologic Maps. All county reports are rare out of print books but our extensive network of resources can generally find most titles within a few days or weeks. All books are hard bound and the accompanying geologic maps (when available) are in color at a scale of 1:62:500 (1 inch = 1 mile). Titles of interest to cavers include: Greenbrier County, 1939, 846 pages. Pocahontas County, 1929, 531 pages. Randolph County, 1931, 989 pages. Hampshire & Hardy Counties, 1927, 624 pages. Jefferson, Berkeley & Morgan Counties, 1916, 644 pages. Mercer, Monroe & Summers Counties, 1926, 963 pages. Mineral & Grant Counties, 1924, 866 pages. Pendleton County, 1927, 384 pages. Tucker County, 1923, 542 pages.
