= Greenland Gap Group =

- Stratigraphic range: Devonian
- Type: Group
- Underlies: Hampshire Formation
- Overlies: Brallier Formation

Location
- Country: United States
- Extent: Maryland and West Virginia

The Greenland Gap Group is a geologic group in West Virginia. It preserves fossils dating back to the Devonian period.

== See also ==
- List of fossiliferous stratigraphic units in West Virginia
