= Snowy River Cave Passage =

Cave in New Mexico, United States

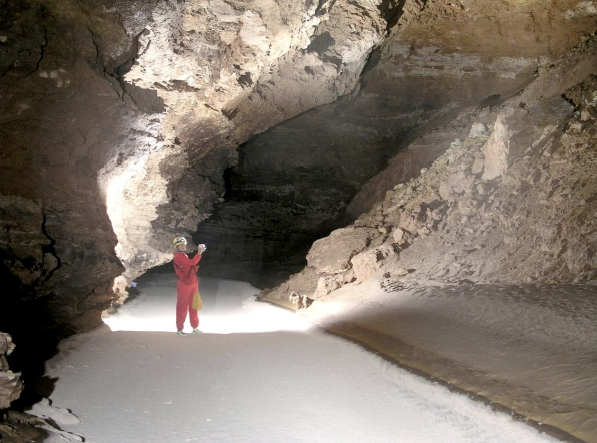
Snowy River

Snowy River Cave Passage is a cave passage within Fort Stanton Cave as part of Fort Stanton–Snowy River Cave National Conservation Area in Lincoln County, New Mexico, obtaining its name from a stream bed of white calcite.

== Geology ==
The bed of Snowy River is covered with bright white calcite. Over time, ancient, slow moving ground water dissolved the limestone walls of the cave and, with the help of microorganisms, recrystallized limestone into the white-colored mineral. Since prehistoric times, ground water saturated with dissolved calcite has periodically flooded the cave, followed by extended periods of dryness, leaving behind coatings and deposits. Fort Stanton Cave, now including the Snowy River Passage, contains the fourth largest cave footprint (the area within a convex polygon that encloses the known cave passages) in the USA.

The Bureau of Land Management reports that Snowy River may be the largest continuous cave formation in America.

== Hydrology ==
Discovered in 2001, Snowy River is a section of a much larger cave complex. Researchers and explorers have not yet determined how the formations relate to the geology and hydrology. After visits to the dry riverbed in 2001, 2003 and 2005, explorers were surprised to find Snowy River flowing with water in 2007 and also in 2010 after a heavy winter snowfall. In 2014, cave surveys reached points as far as 12 miles (19.3 km) from daylight from the cave's single entrance. In August 2014, Snowy River again started flowing and continued to flow for the next three years, severely limiting exploration far upstream past Midnight Junction where a camping area had been established. With surveyed passage reaching 31.59 miles (50.84 km) in 2017, this cave is the third longest cave in New Mexico. At 11 miles, Snowy River is the world's longest calcite formation. The non-profit [1] group has a long history of work in the cave, and in 2017 published a new book 12 Miles From Daylight with over 300 pages and 350 photographs and maps, featuring explorations from 1855 to the present.

== Biology ==
From crusts on the cave walls, antibiotic-producing actinobacteria and some 36 strains of manganese-using bacteria have been discovered. New Mexico Institute of Mining and Technology says the organisms live in this isolated environment by chemically breaking down manganese compounds, creating reconstituted mineral byproducts in the process that may have pharmaceutical uses. Scientists anticipate new biological as well as geologic discoveries will be found.

== See also ==
- List of caves in the United States
- List of longest caves in the United States
