= Environment of West Virginia =

West Virginia is situated in the Appalachian Mountains, bounded by Allegheny Mountains to the east, Ohio river and its tributary Big Sandy River to the west and southwest and the Cumberland Mountains to the south

The environment of West Virginia encompasses terrain and ecosystems ranging from plateaus to mountains. Most of West Virginia lies within the Appalachian mixed mesophytic forests ecoregion, while the higher elevations along the eastern border and in the panhandle lie within the Appalachian-Blue Ridge forests.

West Virginia is situated in the Appalachian Mountains of the Upper South region of the 48 contiguous states. Usually considered part of the South Eastern United States, West Virginia is bounded on the northeast by Pennsylvania and Maryland, on the southeast by Virginia, on the northwest by Ohio, and on the southwest by Kentucky.

A portion of the Appalachian Mountains stretches into eastern West Virginia, and in Pendleton County near the eastern border, Spruce Knob, is officially regarded as the tallest mountain in the Allegheny Mountains, a vast section of the Appalachians. West Virginia covers an area of 24,229.76 square miles (62,754.8 km^{2}), with 24,077.73 square miles (62,361.0 km^{2}) of land and 152.03 square miles (393.8 km^{2}) of water, making it the 41st-largest state in the United States. Generally, it is divided into four geographical regions: Ohio River Valley, Allegheny Plateau, Allegheny Highlands, and Potomac Section.

== Climate ==
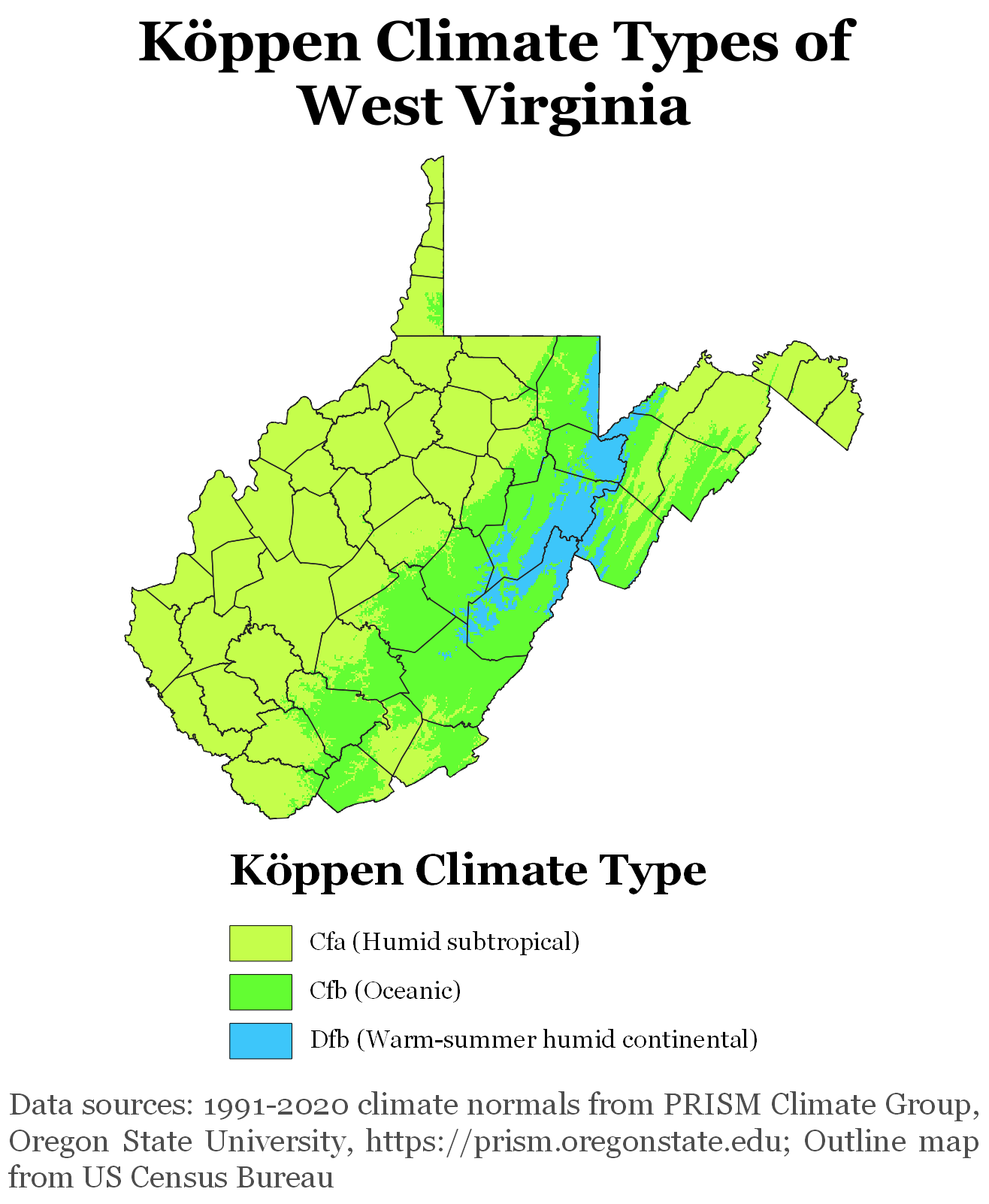
Köppen climate types of West Virginia, using 1991–2020 climate normals

West Virginia state-wide averages

Climate chart (precipitation, max. and min. temperature)
| J | F | M | A | M | J | J | A | S | O | N | D |
| 3.3 39 22 | 2.9 43 24 | 3.8 53 32 | 3.7 64 40 | 4.4 73 50 | 4 80 59 | 4.2 83 64 | 4 82 62 | 3.4 76 56 | 2.9 65 44 | 3.5 54 35 | 3.3 44 27 |
- █ Average max. and min. temperatures in °F
- █ Precipitation totals in inches
- Source: West Virginia University data
Metric conversion
| J | F | M | A | M | J | J | A | S | O | N | D |
| 84 4 −6 | 74 6 −4 | 97 12 0 | 94 18 4 | 112 23 10 | 102 27 15 | 107 28 18 | 102 28 17 | 86 24 13 | 74 18 7 | 89 12 2 | 84 7 −3 |
- █ Average max. and min. temperatures in °C
- █ Precipitation totals in mm

West Virginia generally has a humid subtropical climate (Köppen Cfa) with very warm, humid summers and chilly winters. The climate increases in severity with elevation, and the highest elevations have a snowy humid continental climate (Köppen Dfb). Some areas of intermediate altitude have a mountain temperate climate (Köppen Cfb) where winter temperatures are more moderate and summer temperatures are somewhat cooler. However, the weather is subject in all parts of the state to change. The hardiness zones range from zone 5b in the central Appalachian mountains to zone 7a in the warmest parts of the lowest elevations.

In the Eastern Panhandle and the Ohio River Valley, temperatures are warm enough to see and grow subtropical plants such as southern magnolia (Magnolia grandiflora), crepe myrtle, Albizia julibrissin, American sweetgum and even the occasional needle palm and sabal minor. These plants do not thrive as well in other parts of the state. The eastern prickly pear grows well in many portions of the state.

Average January temperatures range from around 26 °F or −3.3 °C near the Cheat River to 41 °F or 5 °C along sections of the border with Kentucky. July averages range from 67 °F or 19.4 °C along the North Branch Potomac River to 76 °F or 24.4 °C in the western part of the state. It is cooler in the mountains than in the lower sections of the state. The highest recorded temperature in the state is 112 °F or 44.4 °C at Martinsburg on July 10, 1936, and the lowest recorded temperature in the state is −37 °F or −38.3 °C at Lewisburg on December 30, 1917.

Annual precipitation ranges from less than 32 inches (810 mm) in the lower eastern section to more than 56 inches (1,400 mm) in higher parts of the Allegheny Front. Valleys in the east have lower rainfall because the Allegheny mountain ridges to the west create a partial rain shadow. Slightly more than half the rainfall occurs from April to September. Dense fogs are common in many valleys of the Kanawha section, especially the Tygart Valley. West Virginia is also one of the cloudiest states in the nation, with the cities of Elkins and Beckley ranking 9th and 10th in the U.S. respectively for the number of cloudy days per year (over 210). In addition to persistent cloudy skies caused by the damming of moisture by the Alleghenies, West Virginia also experiences some of the most frequent precipitation in the nation, with Snowshoe averaging nearly 200 days a year with either rain or snow. Snow usually lasts only a few days in the lower sections but may persist for weeks in the higher mountain areas. An average of 34 inches or 0.86 metres of snow falls annually in Charleston, although during the winter of 1995–1996 more than three times that amount fell as several cities in the state established new records for snowfall. Average snowfall in the Allegheny Highlands can range up to 180 inches or 4.6 metres per year. Severe weather is somewhat less prevalent in West Virginia than in most other eastern states, and it ranks among the least tornado-prone states east of the Rockies.

=== Climate data ===
Climate data for Charleston (Köppen Cfa)
| Month | Jan | Feb | Mar | Apr | May | Jun | Jul | Aug | Sep | Oct | Nov | Dec | Year |
|---|---|---|---|---|---|---|---|---|---|---|---|---|---|
| Record high °F (°C) | 81 (27) | 81 (27) | 92 (33) | 96 (36) | 98 (37) | 105 (41) | 108 (42) | 108 (42) | 104 (40) | 96 (36) | 87 (31) | 80 (27) | 108 (42) |
| Mean maximum °F (°C) | 68.2 (20.1) | 70.6 (21.4) | 79.1 (26.2) | 86.8 (30.4) | 88.8 (31.6) | 92.0 (33.3) | 93.9 (34.4) | 93.1 (33.9) | 90.1 (32.3) | 84.5 (29.2) | 77.3 (25.2) | 69.1 (20.6) | 95.3 (35.2) |
| Mean daily maximum °F (°C) | 43.9 (6.6) | 47.8 (8.8) | 56.8 (13.8) | 69.4 (20.8) | 76.2 (24.6) | 83.1 (28.4) | 86.0 (30.0) | 85.2 (29.6) | 79.5 (26.4) | 68.7 (20.4) | 57.3 (14.1) | 47.5 (8.6) | 66.8 (19.3) |
| Daily mean °F (°C) | 35.0 (1.7) | 38.2 (3.4) | 46.0 (7.8) | 56.9 (13.8) | 64.7 (18.2) | 72.3 (22.4) | 75.8 (24.3) | 74.6 (23.7) | 68.3 (20.2) | 57.0 (13.9) | 46.4 (8.0) | 38.7 (3.7) | 56.2 (13.4) |
| Mean daily minimum °F (°C) | 26.1 (−3.3) | 28.6 (−1.9) | 35.1 (1.7) | 44.5 (6.9) | 53.2 (11.8) | 61.5 (16.4) | 65.5 (18.6) | 64.1 (17.8) | 57.1 (13.9) | 45.3 (7.4) | 35.6 (2.0) | 29.9 (−1.2) | 45.5 (7.5) |
| Mean minimum °F (°C) | 5.5 (−14.7) | 9.9 (−12.3) | 17.0 (−8.3) | 27.6 (−2.4) | 37.1 (2.8) | 48.8 (9.3) | 55.7 (13.2) | 54.1 (12.3) | 43.3 (6.3) | 30.4 (−0.9) | 20.6 (−6.3) | 12.9 (−10.6) | 2.3 (−16.5) |
| Record low °F (°C) | −16 (−27) | −12 (−24) | −5 (−21) | 18 (−8) | 26 (−3) | 33 (1) | 46 (8) | 41 (5) | 32 (0) | 17 (−8) | 6 (−14) | −17 (−27) | −17 (−27) |
| Average precipitation inches (mm) | 3.27 (83) | 3.36 (85) | 4.14 (105) | 3.56 (90) | 4.93 (125) | 4.72 (120) | 5.38 (137) | 3.75 (95) | 3.46 (88) | 2.91 (74) | 3.20 (81) | 3.56 (90) | 46.24 (1,174) |
| Average snowfall inches (cm) | 10.3 (26) | 7.7 (20) | 5.9 (15) | 0.5 (1.3) | 0.0 (0.0) | 0.0 (0.0) | 0.0 (0.0) | 0.0 (0.0) | 0.0 (0.0) | 0.6 (1.5) | 1.5 (3.8) | 5.0 (13) | 31.5 (80) |
| Average precipitation days (≥ 0.01 in) | 14.8 | 13.7 | 14.8 | 13.4 | 14.1 | 12.5 | 12.8 | 10.6 | 9.0 | 10.1 | 11.0 | 14.2 | 151.0 |
| Average snowy days (≥ 0.1 in) | 7.6 | 6.2 | 3.9 | 0.5 | 0.0 | 0.0 | 0.0 | 0.0 | 0.0 | 0.1 | 1.5 | 4.1 | 23.9 |
Source: NOAA

Climate data for Huntington (Köppen Cfa)
| Month | Jan | Feb | Mar | Apr | May | Jun | Jul | Aug | Sep | Oct | Nov | Dec | Year |
|---|---|---|---|---|---|---|---|---|---|---|---|---|---|
| Record high °F (°C) | 79 (26) | 81 (27) | 92 (33) | 92 (33) | 97 (36) | 105 (41) | 108 (42) | 107 (42) | 103 (39) | 95 (35) | 86 (30) | 80 (27) | 108 (42) |
| Mean daily maximum °F (°C) | 43.2 (6.2) | 47.3 (8.5) | 56.8 (13.8) | 68.8 (20.4) | 76.2 (24.6) | 83.3 (28.5) | 86.4 (30.2) | 85.5 (29.7) | 79.6 (26.4) | 68.6 (20.3) | 56.6 (13.7) | 46.7 (8.2) | 66.6 (19.2) |
| Daily mean °F (°C) | 34.8 (1.6) | 38.2 (3.4) | 46.4 (8.0) | 57.2 (14.0) | 65.2 (18.4) | 72.9 (22.7) | 76.4 (24.7) | 75.2 (24.0) | 68.7 (20.4) | 57.4 (14.1) | 46.6 (8.1) | 38.6 (3.7) | 56.5 (13.6) |
| Mean daily minimum °F (°C) | 26.4 (−3.1) | 29.1 (−1.6) | 36.1 (2.3) | 45.5 (7.5) | 54.2 (12.3) | 62.4 (16.9) | 66.4 (19.1) | 64.8 (18.2) | 57.7 (14.3) | 46.1 (7.8) | 36.6 (2.6) | 30.4 (−0.9) | 46.3 (7.9) |
| Record low °F (°C) | −21 (−29) | −24 (−31) | −2 (−19) | 15 (−9) | 27 (−3) | 39 (4) | 46 (8) | 43 (6) | 29 (−2) | 16 (−9) | 4 (−16) | −14 (−26) | −24 (−31) |
| Average precipitation inches (mm) | 3.10 (79) | 3.37 (86) | 4.16 (106) | 3.91 (99) | 4.51 (115) | 4.20 (107) | 5.08 (129) | 3.95 (100) | 3.16 (80) | 3.02 (77) | 3.07 (78) | 3.57 (91) | 45.10 (1,146) |
| Average snowfall inches (cm) | 6.0 (15) | 5.8 (15) | 4.3 (11) | 0.3 (0.76) | 0.0 (0.0) | 0.0 (0.0) | 0.0 (0.0) | 0.0 (0.0) | 0.0 (0.0) | 0.2 (0.51) | 0.5 (1.3) | 2.7 (6.9) | 19.8 (50) |
| Average precipitation days (≥ 0.01 in) | 13.4 | 12.2 | 13.5 | 13.1 | 13.7 | 12.5 | 12.2 | 9.9 | 8.3 | 10.2 | 10.3 | 12.8 | 142.1 |
| Average snowy days (≥ 0.1 in) | 4.4 | 3.7 | 2.5 | 0.5 | 0.0 | 0.0 | 0.0 | 0.0 | 0.0 | 0.1 | 0.8 | 2.8 | 14.8 |
Source: NOAA

Climate data for Morgantown (Köppen Cfa/Dfa)
| Month | Jan | Feb | Mar | Apr | May | Jun | Jul | Aug | Sep | Oct | Nov | Dec | Year |
|---|---|---|---|---|---|---|---|---|---|---|---|---|---|
| Record high °F (°C) | 79 (26) | 80 (27) | 87 (31) | 93 (34) | 95 (35) | 99 (37) | 103 (39) | 105 (41) | 102 (39) | 94 (34) | 83 (28) | 77 (25) | 105 (41) |
| Mean maximum °F (°C) | 66 (19) | 67 (19) | 75 (24) | 84 (29) | 88 (31) | 91 (33) | 93 (34) | 91 (33) | 89 (32) | 82 (28) | 75 (24) | 66 (19) | 93 (34) |
| Mean daily maximum °F (°C) | 40.1 (4.5) | 43.7 (6.5) | 52.6 (11.4) | 65.2 (18.4) | 73.6 (23.1) | 80.9 (27.2) | 84.4 (29.1) | 83.1 (28.4) | 77.1 (25.1) | 65.9 (18.8) | 54.1 (12.3) | 44.3 (6.8) | 63.8 (17.7) |
| Daily mean °F (°C) | 32.0 (0.0) | 34.8 (1.6) | 42.6 (5.9) | 53.8 (12.1) | 62.6 (17.0) | 70.3 (21.3) | 74.1 (23.4) | 72.8 (22.7) | 66.5 (19.2) | 55.3 (12.9) | 44.9 (7.2) | 36.4 (2.4) | 53.8 (12.1) |
| Mean daily minimum °F (°C) | 24.0 (−4.4) | 25.8 (−3.4) | 32.6 (0.3) | 42.4 (5.8) | 51.5 (10.8) | 59.7 (15.4) | 63.8 (17.7) | 62.5 (16.9) | 55.9 (13.3) | 44.7 (7.1) | 35.8 (2.1) | 28.6 (−1.9) | 43.9 (6.6) |
| Mean minimum °F (°C) | 3 (−16) | 7 (−14) | 14 (−10) | 26 (−3) | 36 (2) | 45 (7) | 53 (12) | 52 (11) | 42 (6) | 30 (−1) | 20 (−7) | 12 (−11) | 0 (−18) |
| Record low °F (°C) | −20 (−29) | −25 (−32) | −4 (−20) | 6 (−14) | 25 (−4) | 30 (−1) | 40 (4) | 38 (3) | 30 (−1) | 15 (−9) | −1 (−18) | −16 (−27) | −25 (−32) |
| Average precipitation inches (mm) | 3.12 (79) | 2.81 (71) | 3.65 (93) | 3.87 (98) | 4.33 (110) | 4.07 (103) | 4.93 (125) | 3.65 (93) | 3.41 (87) | 3.09 (78) | 3.02 (77) | 3.20 (81) | 43.15 (1,096) |
| Average snowfall inches (cm) | 9.1 (23) | 5.5 (14) | 7.0 (18) | 1.0 (2.5) | 0.0 (0.0) | 0.0 (0.0) | 0.0 (0.0) | 0.0 (0.0) | 0.0 (0.0) | 0.1 (0.25) | 1.1 (2.8) | 3.8 (9.7) | 27.6 (70) |
| Average precipitation days (≥ 0.01 in) | 15.5 | 13.0 | 14.4 | 14.1 | 14.7 | 13.1 | 12.4 | 10.5 | 10.3 | 11.4 | 11.7 | 13.9 | 155.0 |
| Average snowy days (≥ 0.1 in) | 6.1 | 4.3 | 3.3 | 0.3 | 0.0 | 0.0 | 0.0 | 0.0 | 0.0 | 0.2 | 1.1 | 3.5 | 18.8 |
Source: NOAA (snow 1981–2010)

== Geology ==
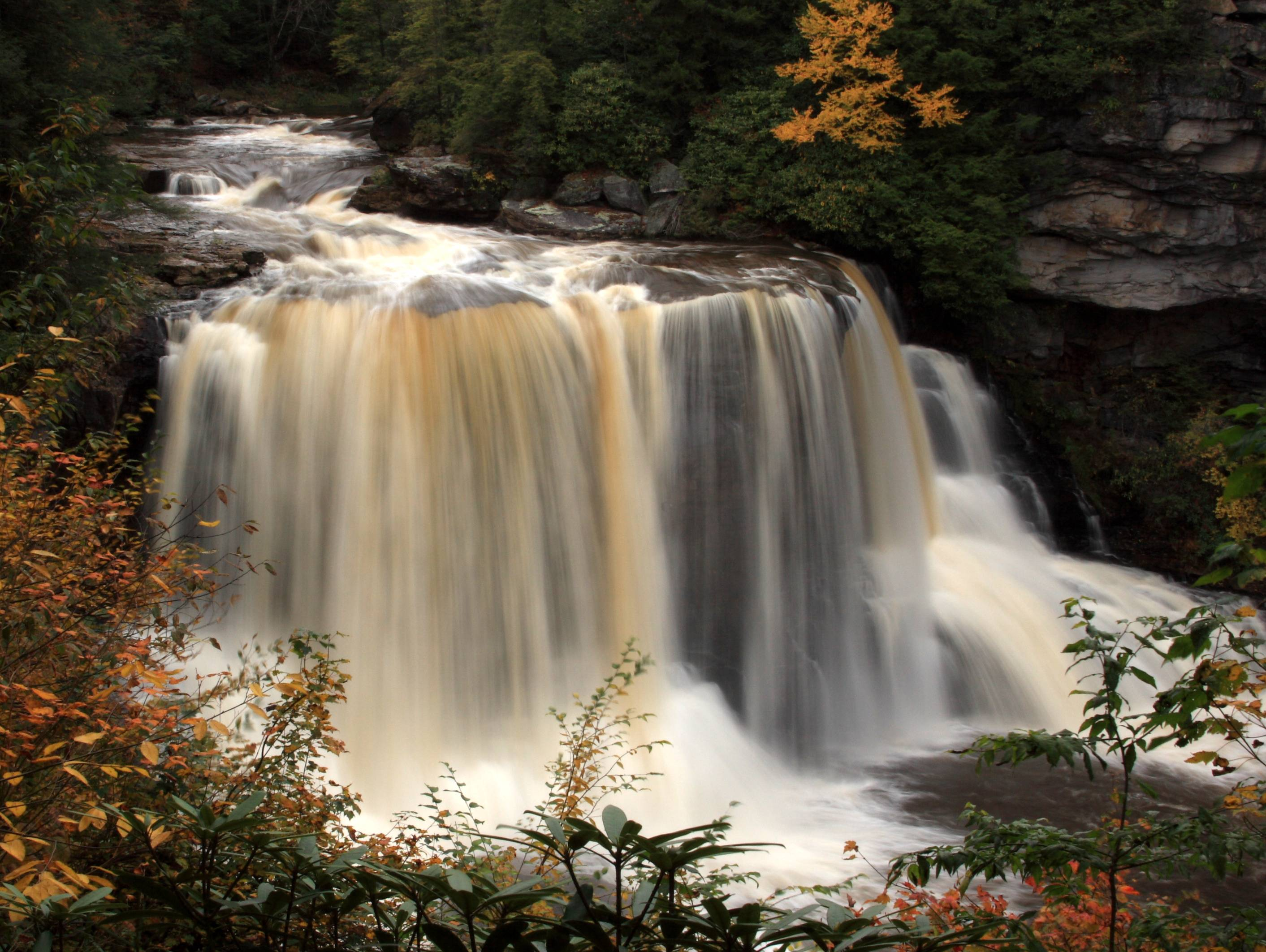
A view of Blackwater Falls State Park

Historical Geology Summary

Prior to one billion years ago, the geologic history of West Virginia is obscure. Sometime between about 1,100 and 800 million years ago, lava was deposited in the extreme eastern part of the State forming our oldest exposed rock, the Catoctin Greenstone. Later, perhaps about 800 million years ago, a narrow trough began to form in extreme eastern West Virginia. An arm of the sea entered and sediments accumulated. As time went on, this shallow sea transgressed westward. By the end of Cambrian time, about 300 million years later, this shallow sea covered essentially all of West Virginia. Marine deposition took place throughout most of this and the succeeding Ordovician Period. During this total interval of about 370 million years, most of the rocks exposed in Jefferson and eastern Berkeley counties and in scattered areas southwestward along the Virginia boundary were deposited. Rocks of the same age are found in abundance in the deep wells throughout the State.

The Taconic Orogeny near the end of Ordovician time formed a high mountainous area east of West Virginia. During Middle and Late Devonian time the Acadian Orogeny, with the main uplift to the northeast, resulted in a further source for the predominantly clastic marine deposits of these epochs. However, near the end of Devonian time, the sea was rapidly retreating westward and the continental red beds of the Hampshire Formation were being deposited over most of the State.

The sea made one more important intrusion into West Virginia during Middle Mississippian time, approximately 330 million years ago, resulting in the deposition of the Greenbrier Formation, predominantly limestone, the last marine deposit of significance in the State. At the close of Mississippian time, about 310 million years ago, West Virginia was essentially a land area, subject to erosion. Early in the succeeding Pennsylvanian Period, the area dropped to near sea level and for more than 50 million years continued to sink at about the same rate that deposition was taking place. Permian Period, roughly 270 to 225 million years ago, the Appalachian Orogeny began which played a major part in the formation of the Appalachian Mountains as we know them today. Never again has the sea invaded West Virginia.

The oldest evidences of life found in West Virginia occur in rocks about 600 million years old, in the Antietam Formation of Lower Cambrian age. However, in this formation they are abundant and of forms that had already developed through a substantial part of all evolution that has taken place during the history of the earth. Evidences of life in other parts of the earth are found in rocks at least 3 billion years old. Fossils are found in increasing abundance and increasing stages of evolutional development in the rocks of all ages since earliest Cambrian time.

== Fauna ==
The life zones of West Virginia transitions from large low-land farming valleys bordered with forest and meadow to high-land ridge flats and heavy forestlands, some with rocky ridge-line peaks. The geology allows for a diversity of habitats. The "Mountain State" harbors at least 56 species and subspecies of mammals. The state has more than 300 types of birds and more than 100 species of fish. Many common Insects of the Eastern United States can be found in West Virginia. The state's beetle number about 15 species with more than 70 species of Odonate, some 18 species of spiders and a dozen species of Stonefly. There are about 17 Moth species. There are a little over seven dozen Cave invertebrate species. The West Virginia Division of Wildlife (WVDNR) uses hunting and fishing license fees for wildlife habitat conservation.

== Flora ==
The Allegheny and Cumberland Plateaus of West Virginia are predominantly covered by hardwood forests, but along the Ohio River and its principal tributaries, the valuable timber has been removed and considerable areas have been wholly cleared over the centuries for farming and pasture lands. Among the most prevalent trees of this region are the chestnut oaks, the walnut, the yellow poplar, and the cherry. Southern West Virginia contains the largest reserve supply of timber. In the Ridge-and-Valley region of the Appalachian Mountains, the Eastern Panhandle and Potomac Highlands have a forest covering similar to that of the plateau region, however between these two areas of hardwood there is a long belt where spruce and white pine cover the mountain ridges. Other trees common in the state are the persimmon, sassafras, and, in the Ohio and Potomac Valley regions, the American sycamore. Hickory, chestnut, locust, maple, beech, dogwood, and pawpaw are widely distributed throughout the state as well. Among the state's common shrubs and vines are the blackberry, black and red raspberry, gooseberry, huckleberry, hazel, and wild grape. Ginseng is an important medicinal plant that is harvested primarily in West Virginia's southern regions. Wild ginger, elder, and sumach are common, and deep in the mountainous areas, rhododendrons, mountain laurel, and azaleas grow in abundance.

== Geographical facts ==
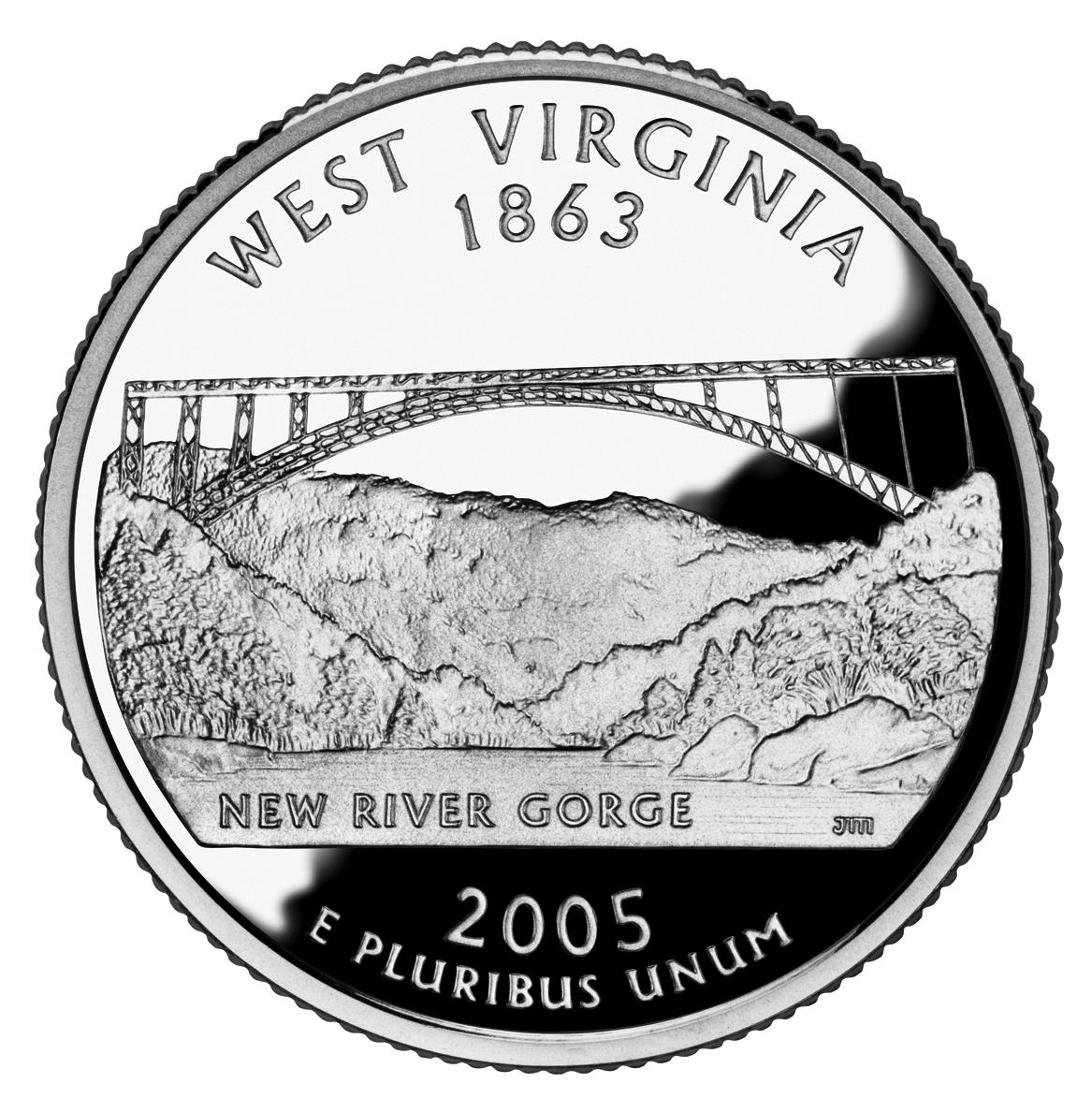
West Virginia state quarter

- Highest Point: Spruce Knob on Spruce Mountain in Pendleton County, 4,863 feet (1,482 m) above sea level
- Lowest Point: Potomac River at Harpers Ferry, 240 feet (73 m) above sea level
- Smallest County: Hancock County, 229 km² (88.2 mi²)
- Largest County: Randolph County, 2,693 km² (1,040 mi²)
- Oldest County: Hampshire County, formed December 13, 1753
- Youngest County: Mingo County, formed 1895
- Most Populous County: Kanawha County, 200,073 (2000)
- Least Populous County: Wirt County, 5,873 (2000)
- Fastest Growing County: Berkeley County, +28.0% growth between 1990 (59,253) and 2000 (75,905) censuses
- Most Populous Municipality: Charleston, 53,421 (2000)
- Least Populous Municipality: Thurmond, 7 (2000)
- Oldest Municipality: Romney in Hampshire County chartered December 23, 1762
- Geographical Center of State: near Sutton in Braxton County
- Center of Population: near Gassaway in Braxton County
- West Virginia is the only state with two Panhandles.

== See also ==
- Mountains of West Virginia
- Islands in West Virginia
- Lakes in West Virginia
- Rivers in West Virginia
- State forests in West Virginia
- State parks in West Virginia
- Wildlife management areas in West Virginia
