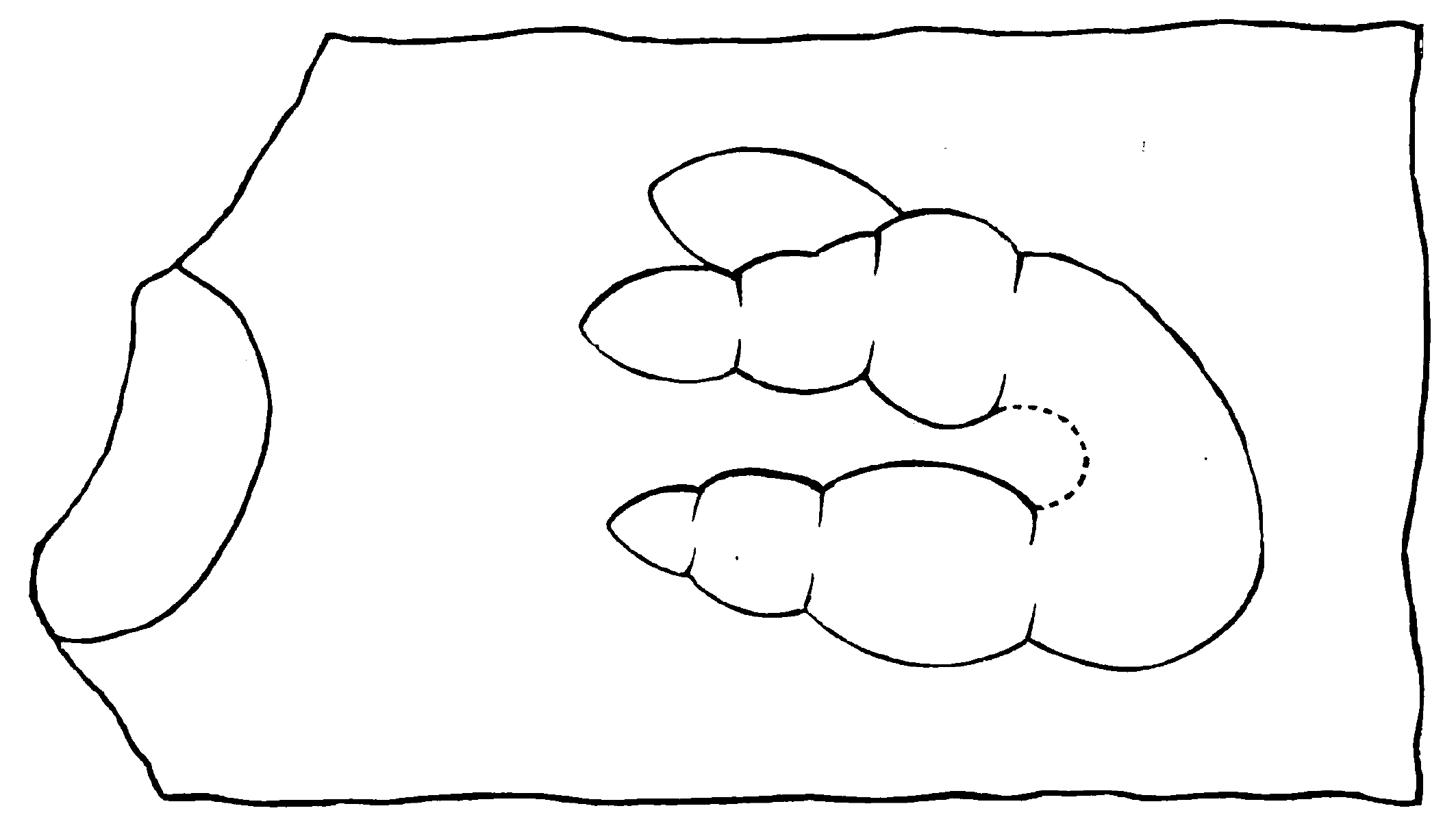
- Outline drawing of the fossil by Othniel Charles Marsh, 1896

Trace fossil classification
- Ichnogenus: †Thinopus; Marsh, 1896

Type ichnospecies
- †Thinopus antiquus Marsh, 1896

Ichnospecies
- †Thinopus antiquus

= Thinopus =

Thinopus Temporal range: Late Devonian

Ichnogenus of marine reptile

Thinopus is the name given to a trace fossil (ichnotaxon) found in late Devonian rocks in Pennsylvania. The only specimen was described by paleontologist Othniel Charles Marsh in a brief note published in 1896, with the only ichnospecies Thinopus antiquus. Marsh interpreted it as the fossil footprints of an early amphibian, making it the oldest evidence for tetrapods (land vertebrates) known at the time. Later research, however, argued that the fossil is better interpreted as the impressions of coprolites (fossilized feces) of fish. This would make Thinopus the earliest published name of a fish coprolite.

== Description ==
The only specimen attributed to Thinopus is a slab containing two concave impressions, a complex impression and part of a second impression. The complex impression is 84.3 millimetres (3.32 in) in length and 64 millimetres (2.5 in) in width, and has a depth of up to 9 millimetres (0.35 in). Its margins are sharply defined and slightly overhanging the impression. The complex impression is horseshoe-shaped, with two elongated impressions joined at their bases, which early workers interpreted as digit impressions. These two impressions taper at one end, and are segmented by constrictions which resemble constrictions between toe pads. A concavity bordering one of the "digit" impressions has been interpreted as a possible third digit impression. The slab is composed of brown-gray sandstone of fine grain size, but also contains fewer coarser grains.

== History of research ==
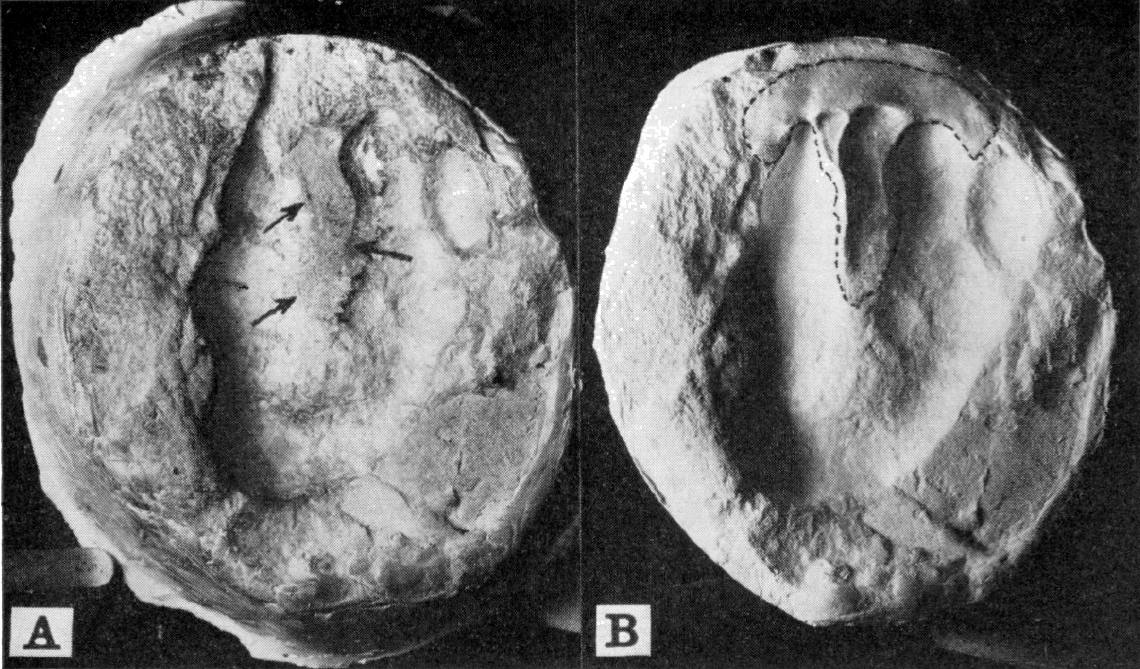
Cast of the fossil as published by Dudley J. Morton in 1926. A) shows the cast of the original, while B) shows a reconstruction of an assumed missing area (outlined by black dotted line), which adds two additional digit impressions.

The fossil was discovered by paleontologist Charles Emerson Beecher south of the Allegheny River in Pleasant, Warren County, in Pennsylvania. After acquiring the fossil from Beecher, Othniel Charles Marsh of the Yale Museum published a brief note naming the new ichnotaxon Thinopus antiquus on October 16, 1896. The note was accompanied by a simple outline drawing. The specimen is part of the collection of the Yale Museum under the specimen number YPM 784.

Marsh interpreted the impressions as the footprints of an amphibian, with the complex, two or three-toed impression pertaining to a left hind foot and the partial impression to a probable fore foot. This find was therefore the first fossil ascribed to a tetrapod (land vertebrate) from the Devonian, and therefore the oldest such fossil known. Marsh's interpretation was widely accepted until the 1930s. American Paleontologist Samuel Wendell Williston, in 1917, used Thinopus as the basis of his basal tetrapod group Protopoda, which fell into disuse since.

American physician Dudley J. Morton, in 1926, argued that the foot of Thinopus was clearly separated from its leg, indicating an elevated position of the body and limbs, and a clear adaptation to locomotion on land. He stated that these features "remove Thinopus by a wide margin from the earliest stages of the transition from an aquatic to a terrestrial habitation", which pushes back the origin of tetrapods well into the Devonian, and possibly even Silurian. Morton noted that Thinopus only showed three digit impressions, which is at odds with the five-toed condition inferred for the original tetrapod. He consequently argued that the five-toed stage might have evolved only later during tetrapod evolution. Alternatively, he suggested that two additional digits might have originally been impressed between the two larger digits but were not preserved, resulting in a five-toed foot. Morton further suggested that the digits would have been outwards directed during walking.

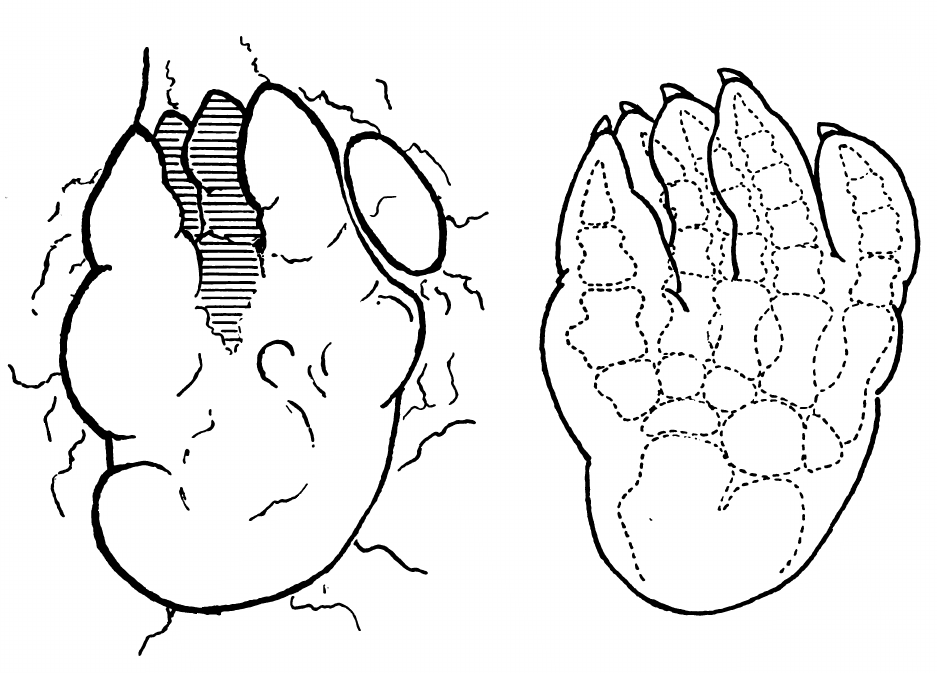
Outline drawing (left) and superimposition of a foot skeleton of an early tetrapod (right), by Dudley J. Morton, 1926. This interpretation shows a five-toed configuration of the assumed footprint.

In 1935, Austrian paleontologist Othenio Abel became the first to question the interpretation of Thinopus as a footprint, after studying the specimen during a research visit in Yale University in 1925. Abel concluded that different interpretations are possible, and found that an identification as the impressions of coprolites (fossilized feces) of a fish would be as likely as its interpretation as a footprint. American zoologist and paleontologist William King Gregory, in 1951, instead interpreted the complex impression as that of the front fin of the lobe-finned fish Eusthenopteron. In a 2015 review, American paleontologist Spencer G. Lucas agreed with Abel's interpretation, noting that it closely resembles coprolites from the Early Mississippian of Nova Scotia, which were likely produced by fish. He further argued that Thinopus does not fit what is now known about the anatomy of early tetrapods; that it lacks symmetry and other features expected for a footprint; and that the overhanging margins rather indicate that it is an impression of a rounded object. Lucas argued that this makes Thinopus the earliest fish coprolite ichnotaxon that was named.

== Stratigraphy and paleoenvironment ==
According to Beecher, the fossil stems from the "Chemung Formation", a geological formation that has since fallen in disuse. Lucas, in his 2015 review, stated that the fossil is thought to come from the Scherr Formation, which is Frasnian in age, i.e. the older part of the Late Devonian, ca. 383–372 million years ago. Beecher noted that ripple marks, mudcracks, rain drop impressions, and marine mollusks occur in the beds the fossil was found in, indicating that the impression formed in a shore environment. The fossil slab itself preserves the bivalve Nuculana.
