= Maccrady Formation =

Carboniferous era eologic formation in West Virginia

- Stratigraphic range: Tournaisian - Viséan
- Type: Formation
- Underlies: Greenbrier Group
- Overlies: Price Formation

Location
- Region: Appalachia and the Southeastern United States
- Country: United States
- Extent: Virginia and West Virginia

The Maccrady Formation is a geologic formation in West Virginia. It preserves fossils dating back to the Carboniferous period.

== See also ==
- List of fossiliferous stratigraphic units in West Virginia
