= Crevice Cave =

Cave in Perry County, Missouri

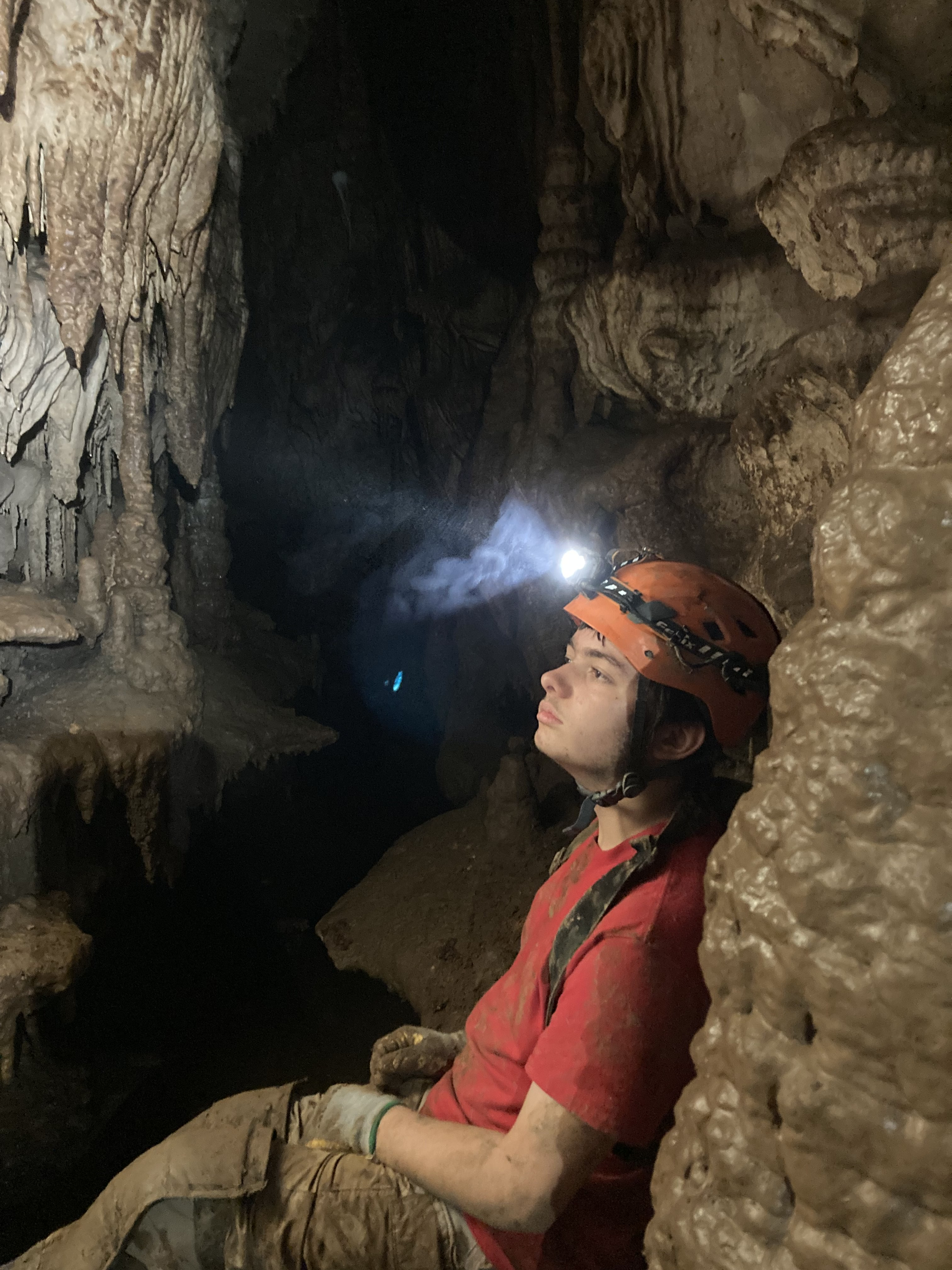
Crevice Cave Interior

Crevice Cave is a cave located in Perry County in the state of Missouri. It is the longest cave in Missouri and one of the longest caves in the United States.

== Geology ==
Speleothems in the cave have been used to determine climate changes in the period stretching from 25,000 to 75,000 years ago, as well as to document periods of cave flooding during the Holocene epoch.

== Length ==
It is the longest cave in Missouri and the 8th or 11th longest cave in the United States.

In 1984 the cave was measured to be 28.20 mi (45.38 km) long. The Missouri Speleological Survey suggests the cave is more than 31.2 mi (50.2 km) in length.

== See also ==
- List of caves in the United States
- List of longest caves in the United States
