= Hampshire Group =

Hampshire Formation
- Stratigraphic range: Famennian
- Type: Formation
- Underlies: Price Formation and Rockwell Formation
- Overlies: Foreknobs Formation and Greenland Gap Group

Location
- Region: Appalachia and Southeastern United States
- Country: United States
- Extent: Maryland, Virginia, and West Virginia

The Hampshire Formation is a geologic formation in West Virginia, USA. It preserves fossils dating back to the Devonian period.

== See also ==
- List of fossiliferous stratigraphic units in West Virginia
