= Foreknobs Formation =

Geological formation in the United States

- Stratigraphic range: Frasnian - Famennian
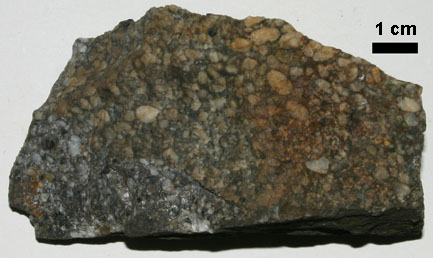
- Conglomerate from Foreknobs Formation, Rt. 994, near western side of bridge going over Raystown Lake, Huntingdon County, Pennsylvania
- Type: sedimentary
- Unit of: Greenland Gap Group
- Sub-units: Mallow Member, Briery Gap Sandstone Member, Blizzard Member, Pound Sandstone Member, and Red Lick Member
- Underlies: Catskill Formation, or Hampshire Formation in VA
- Overlies: Scherr Formation, or Brallier Formation in VA
- Thickness: 1321 ft at type section

Lithology
- Primary: Siltstone, sandstone, shale
- Other: Conglomerate

Location
- Region: Appalachian Mountains
- Extent: Pennsylvania, Maryland, Virginia, West Virginia

Type section
- Named for: Fore Knobs of Allegheny Front
- Named by: J. M. Dennison, 1970

The Devonian Foreknobs Formation is a mapped bedrock unit in Pennsylvania, Maryland, Virginia, and West Virginia.

== Description ==
The Foreknobs Formation contains massive sandstones; siltstone; "redbeds" of brownish-gray sandstone, siltstone, and shale containing scattered marine fossils; and occasional quartz-pebble conglomerate or conglomeratic sandstone beds.

=== Stratigraphy ===
Dennison (1970) renamed the old Chemung Formation the Greenland Gap Group and divided it into the lower Scherr Formation and the upper Foreknobs Formation. De Witt (1974) extended the Scherr and Foreknobs into Pennsylvania, but did not use the term Greenland Gap Group.

Boswell, et al. (1987), does not recognize the Scherr and Foreknobs Formations in the subsurface of West Virginia and thus these formations are reduced from "group" to "formation" as the Greenland Gap Formation.

Rossbach and Dennison (1994) extended the Foreknobs into the Catawba syncline of southwestern Virginia.

The Foreknobs is divided into the following Members, in ascending order: Mallow Member, Briery Gap Sandstone Member, Blizzard Member, Pound Sandstone Member, and Red Lick Member

=== Fossils ===
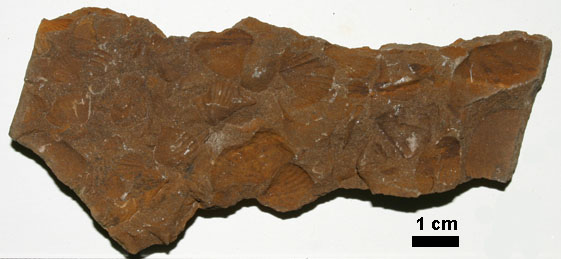
Foreknobs Formation containing abundant Mucrospirifer brachiopods, from near upper reservoir of Bath County Pumped Storage Station

Red beds within the Foreknobs contain scattered marine fossils, such as brachiopods.

=== Notable Exposures ===
Type section: along WV Highway 42, 0.48 km northwest of Scherr, Grant County, West Virginia

== Age ==
Relative age dating places the Foreknobs in the Late Devonian.
