= Price Formation =

- Stratigraphic range: Famennian- Tournaisian
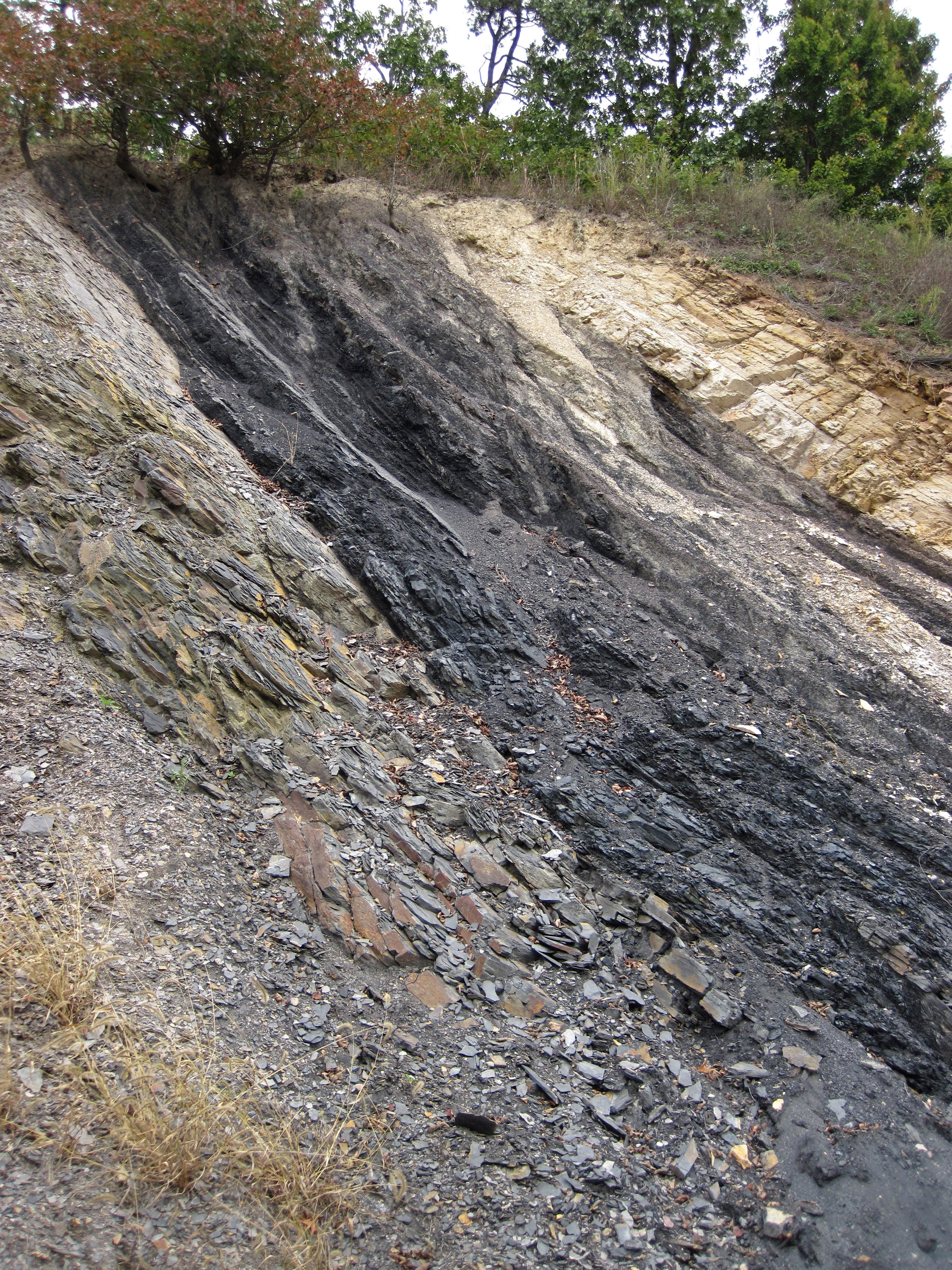
- Outcrop of Merrimac Coal, Price Formation; Valley Coalfield, Virginia
- Type: Geological formation
- Sub-units: Merrimac Coal, Langhorne Coal
- Underlies: Maccrady Formation and Greenbrier Group
- Overlies: Hampshire Group and Sunbury Shale

Lithology
- Primary: shale, siltstone
- Other: coal

Location
- Region: Virginia and West Virginia
- Country: United States

The Price Formation is a geologic formation in Virginia and West Virginia. It preserves fossils dating back to the Carboniferous period.

== Fossil content ==
=== Invertebrates ===
==== Eurypterids ====
Eurypterids reported from the Price Formation
Genus	Species	Presence	Material	Notes	Images
Cyrtoctenus	C. bambachi	Western Virginia.		A hibbertopterid.	

=== Plants ===
Plants reported from the Price Formation
Genus	Species	Presence	Material	Notes	Images
Cardiopteridium	C. nanum f. spetsbergense		Slender axes or portions of bipinnate fronds.		
Gnetopsis	G. hispida	Southwestern Virginia.	Seeds.		
Lagenospermum	L. imparirameum	Southwestern Virginia.	Seeds.		
Neuropteris	N. antiqua		Bipinnate fronds terminated by pinnules.		

== See also ==
- List of fossiliferous stratigraphic units in Virginia
- List of fossiliferous stratigraphic units in West Virginia
- Paleontology in Virginia
