= Friars Hole Cave System =

Cave in Pocahontas county, West Virginia

- Location within West Virginia Location within the United States
- Location: West Virginia
- Coordinates: 38.067203°N 80.329775°W
- Depth: 186.8 m (613 ft)
- Length: 82.5 km (51.3 mi)
- Discovery: 1950
- Geology: Limestone
- Entrances: 8

Friars Hole Cave System is a cave in West Virginia's Greenbrier and Pocahontas counties. First surveyed in the 1960s, it is one of the longest in the United States and the world.

Various sources put its total length at 63 km, 73.4 km, 72 km, 77.4 km, or 82.5 km long. The West Virginia Encyclopedia says that 44 miles (71 km) of the cave have been surveyed, making it the longest cave in the state, the 7th-longest cave in the United States, and the 35th-longest cave in the world. In 2017, William B. White called it the 31st-longest cave in the world.

The cave has eleven entrances, five of which are closed: Friars Hole, Rubber Chicken, Crookshank Pit, Toothpick, Icebox, Snedegars caves entrances (Snedegars Staircase, Snedegars Saltpeter, Snedegars Stream, Snedegars North), Canadian Hole, and Radio Pit.

In January 2020, the original entrance to the cave started growing unstable. Due to this, efforts were made to extend a nearby cave, known as Icebox Cave, to connect it to the Frairs Hole Cave System. In September of the same year, those efforts were completed leading to the eleventh entrance of the cave - the Icebox Entrance. The Frairs Hole Cave Entrance remains unstable and closed to the public.

The cave formed in the Mississippian Greenbrier Group. The oldest passage of the cave is said to be 4.1 million years old. The cave was formed by streams sinking down into the ground. The minor structures in the cave were influenced by thrust faults.

== See also ==
- List of caves in the United States
- List of longest caves in the United States
