= Scherr Formation =

Bedrock formation in the United States

- Stratigraphic range: Late Devonian
- Type: sedimentary
- Unit of: Greenland Gap Group
- Sub-units: Minnehaha Springs Member
- Underlies: Foreknobs Formation
- Overlies: Brallier Formation
- Thickness: 1,004 ft (306 m) at type section

Lithology
- Primary: Shale
- Other: Siltstone

Location
- Region: Appalachian Mountains
- Extent: Pennsylvania, Maryland, Virginia, West Virginia

Type section
- Named for: Scherr, West Virginia
- Named by: J. M. Dennison, 1970

The Devonian Scherr Formation is a mapped bedrock unit in Pennsylvania, Maryland, Virginia and West Virginia.

== Description ==
The Scherr Formation consists predominantly of siltstone and shale. Lower part of unit includes considerable fine-grained sandstone, while upper two thirds contains almost no sandstone. It weathers light olive gray.

=== Stratigraphy ===
Dennison (1970) renamed the old Chemung Formation the Greenland Gap Group and divided it into the lower Scherr Formation and the upper Foreknobs Formation. De Witt (1974) extended the Scherr and Foreknobs into Pennsylvania but did not use the term Greenland Gap Group.

Boswell et al. (1987), does not recognize the Scherr and Foreknobs Formations in the subsurface of West Virginia, and thus, these formations are reduced from "group" to "formation" as the Greenland Gap Formation.

The Minnehaha Springs Member is a "clastic bundle" consisting of interbedded medium gray siltstone and olive-gray shale with some grayish-red siltstone and shale and some sandstone. It is interpreted as turbidites. This same member is proposed to exist at the base of the Scherr's lateral equivalent, the Lock Haven Formation.

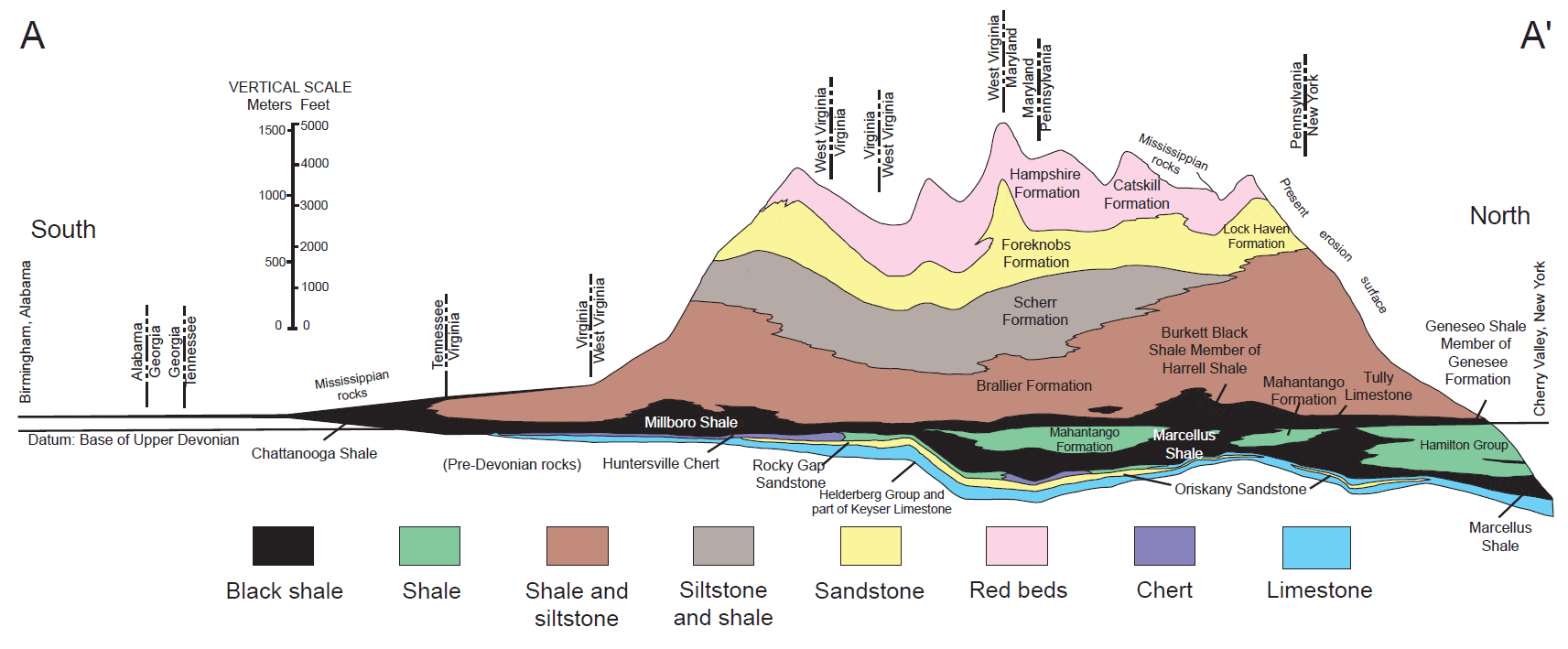
Scherr Formation within a geological cross section of the United States

=== Notable outcrops ===
- Type section: along West Virginia Route 42, Grant County 39°11′45″N 79°10′48″W

== Age ==
Relative age dating places the Scherr in the late Devonian.

== Paleontology ==
The Scherr Formation is the likely origin of the trace fossil Thinopus, which was described in 1896 by Othniel Charles Marsh as the earliest known tetrapod (land vertebrate). Later research, however, identified this fossil as coprolites (fossilized feces) of fishes.
