= Fort Stanton–Snowy River Cave National Conservation Area =

- IUCN category V (protected landscape/seascape)
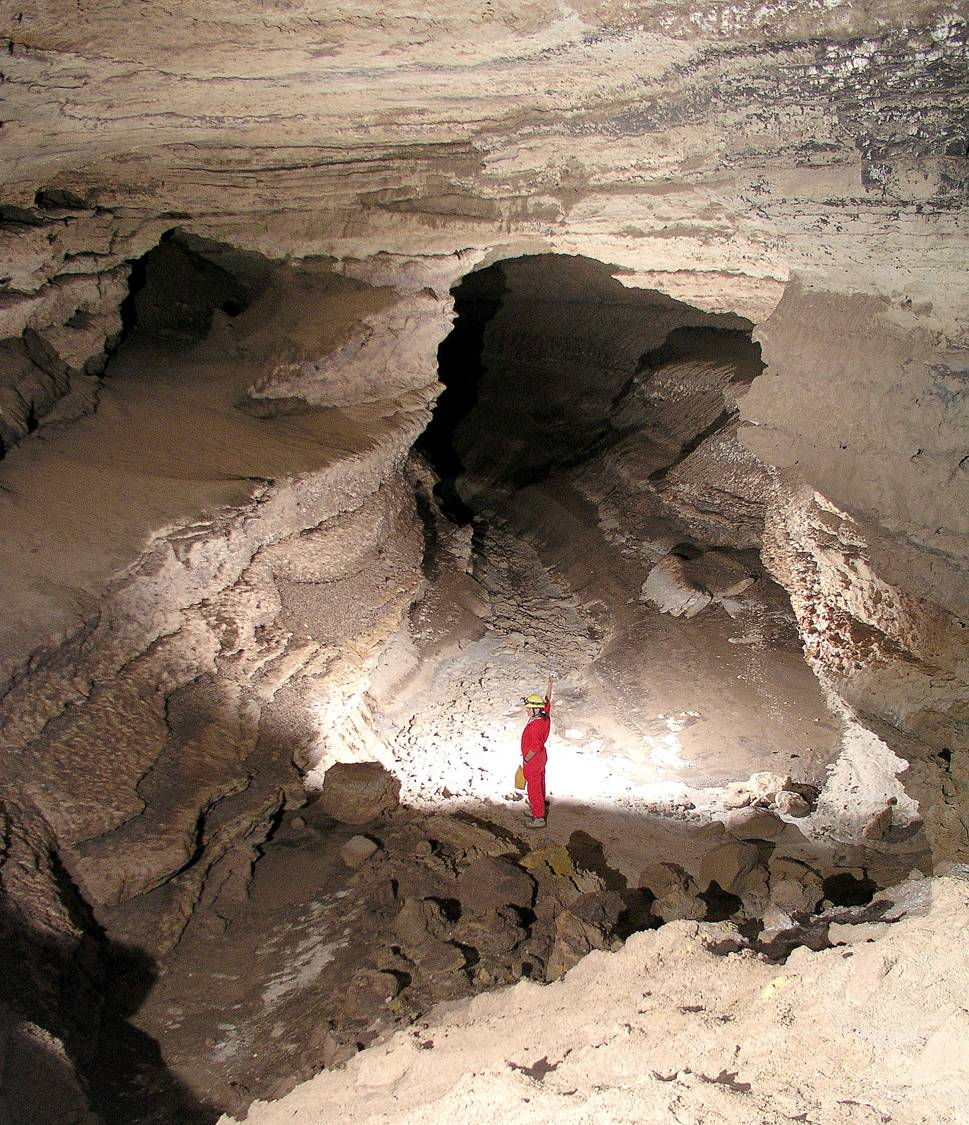
- Fort Stanton Cave

- Location within the United States
- Location: Lincoln County, New Mexico
- Nearest city: Roswell, New Mexico
- Coordinates: 33.502°N 105.528°W
- Area: 25,080 acres (101.5 km^{2})
- Established: 2009
- Governing body: Bureau of Land Management
- Website: Fort Stanton–Snowy River Cave National Conservation Area

A map of the Fort Stanton-Snowy River Cave National Conservation Area in New Mexico

The Fort Stanton–Snowy River Cave National Conservation Area is a National Conservation Area in the eastern foothills of the Sierra Blanca, between Capitan and Lincoln in south central New Mexico. Including approximately 25,080 acres (10,150 ha) and located at an elevation of about 6,300 feet (1,900 m) above sea level. It was established in 2009 to protect, conserve, and enhance the unique and nationally important historic, cultural, scientific, archaeological, natural, and educational cave resources of the Fort Stanton–Snowy River cave system.

The National Conservation Area was once known as the Fort Stanton Military Reservation. In 1855, the U.S. Cavalry established Fort Stanton as a cavalry fort. During these tumultuous times, the 9th and 10th Cavalry and the 24th and 25th Infantry Buffalo Soldiers were sent to the New Mexico Territory to protect settlers in the area. The historic fort and its buildings are managed by the New Mexico State Parks Division. The lands surrounding the fort are managed by the Bureau of Land Management. Within the National Conservation Area is Fort Stanton Cave, the third longest cave in New Mexico. This cave was explored by soldiers posted at the fort as evidenced by their inscriptions within the cave. Snowy River Cave is a famous cave passage within Fort Stanton Cave, named for its beautiful stream bed of bright white calcite. Snowy River Cave is a National Natural Landmark.

== See also ==
- Snowy River Cave
