= Renicks Valley, West Virginia =

- Unincorporated community
- Location within West Virginia Location within the United States
- Coordinates: 38°03′16″N 80°18′11″W
- Country: United States
- State: West Virginia
- County: Greenbrier
- Elevation: 2,480 ft (760 m)
- Time zone: UTC-5 (Eastern (EST))
  - Summer (DST): UTC-4 (EDT)
- Area codes: 304 & 681
- GNIS feature ID: 1555463

Renicks Valley is an unincorporated community in Greenbrier County, West Virginia, United States. Renicks Valley is 5 miles (8.0 km) northeast of Falling Spring (Renick).

The community was named after Major William Renick, a pioneer settler.
