= Greenbrier Group =

Lithostratigraphic unit

Greenbrier Limestone
- Stratigraphic range: Middle Mississippian
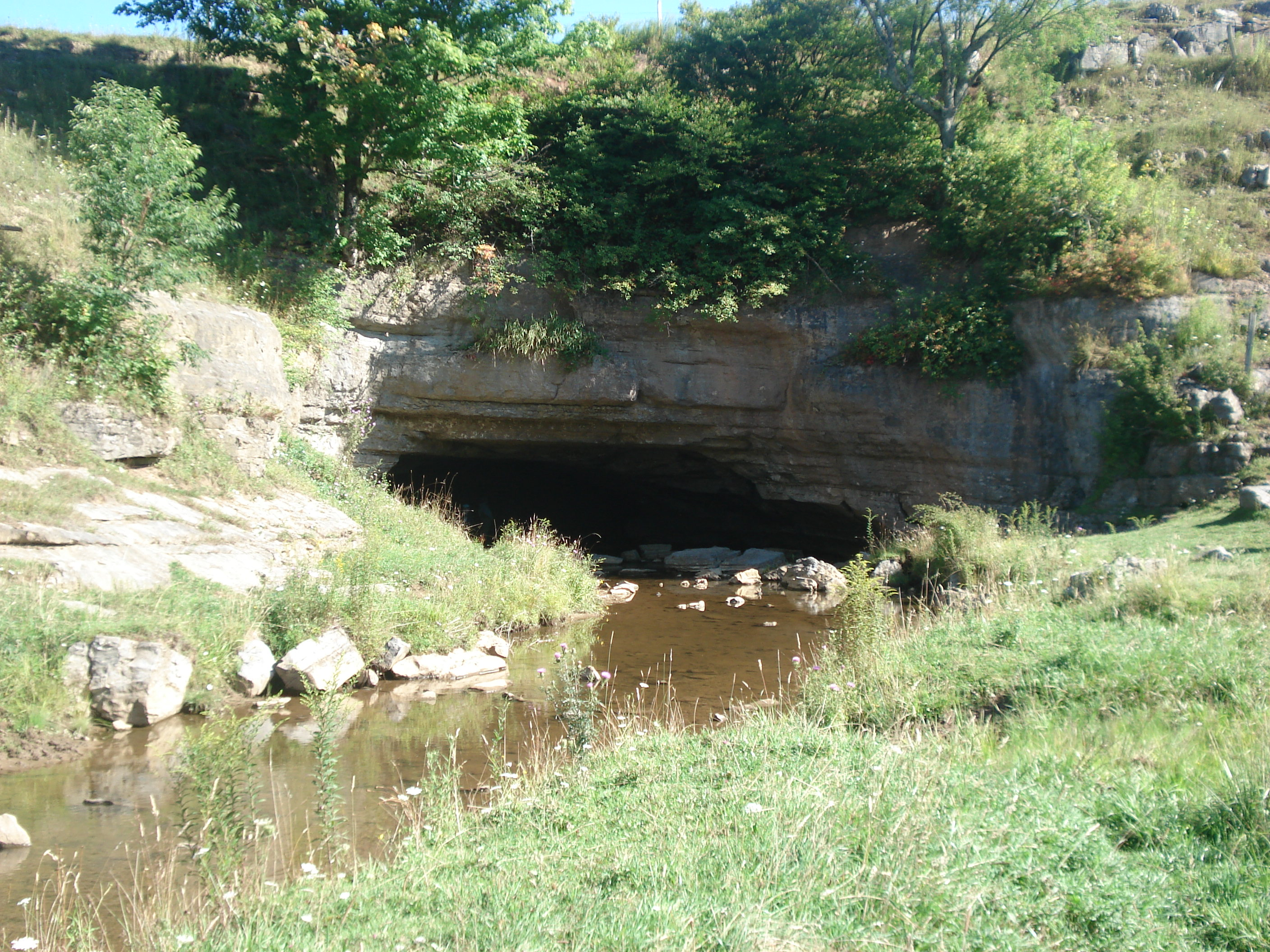
- The Sinks of Gandy (an underground stream) is developed in the Greenbrier Limestone Formation in West Virginia.
- Type: sedimentary
- Sub-units: Denmar Limestone, Taggard Shale, Pickaway Limestone, Union Limestone, Greenville Shale, and Alderson Limestone.
- Underlies: Bluefield Formation
- Overlies: Maccrady Formation and Price Formation
- Thickness: 120 m

Lithology
- Primary: Limestone

Location
- Region: Allegheny Mountains
- Country: United States
- Extent: Kentucky, Maryland, Virginia, and West Virginia

Type section
- Named for: Greenbrier River

The Greenbrier Limestone, also known locally as the "Big Lime", is an extensive limestone unit deposited during the Middle Mississippian Epoch (345.3 ± 2.1 – 326.4 ± 1.6 Ma), part of the Carboniferous Period. This rock stratum is present below ground in much of West Virginia and neighboring Kentucky, and extends somewhat into adjacent western Maryland and southwestern Virginia. The name derives from the Greenbrier River in West Virginia.

Greenbrier Limestone is in some places more than 400 feet (120 metres) thick, allowing it to trap large quantities of oil and gas. Since this carbonate rock erodes quickly in the region's wet climate, outcrops are not prominent and are often quarried.

The Greenbrier Limestone is subdivided into six stratigraphic units. In ascending order, they are Denmar Limestone, Taggard Shale, Pickaway Limestone, Union Limestone, Greenville Shale, and Alderson Limestone. The limestones in this interval are predominantly skeletal grainstones or packstones. The Pickaway and especially the Union contain oolitic grainstones.

Numerous solution caves are developed within the Greenbrier Formation.

== See also ==
- List of types of limestone
- Geology of West Virginia
