= Brallier Formation =

Geologic formation in the United States

- Stratigraphic range: Frasnian - Famennian
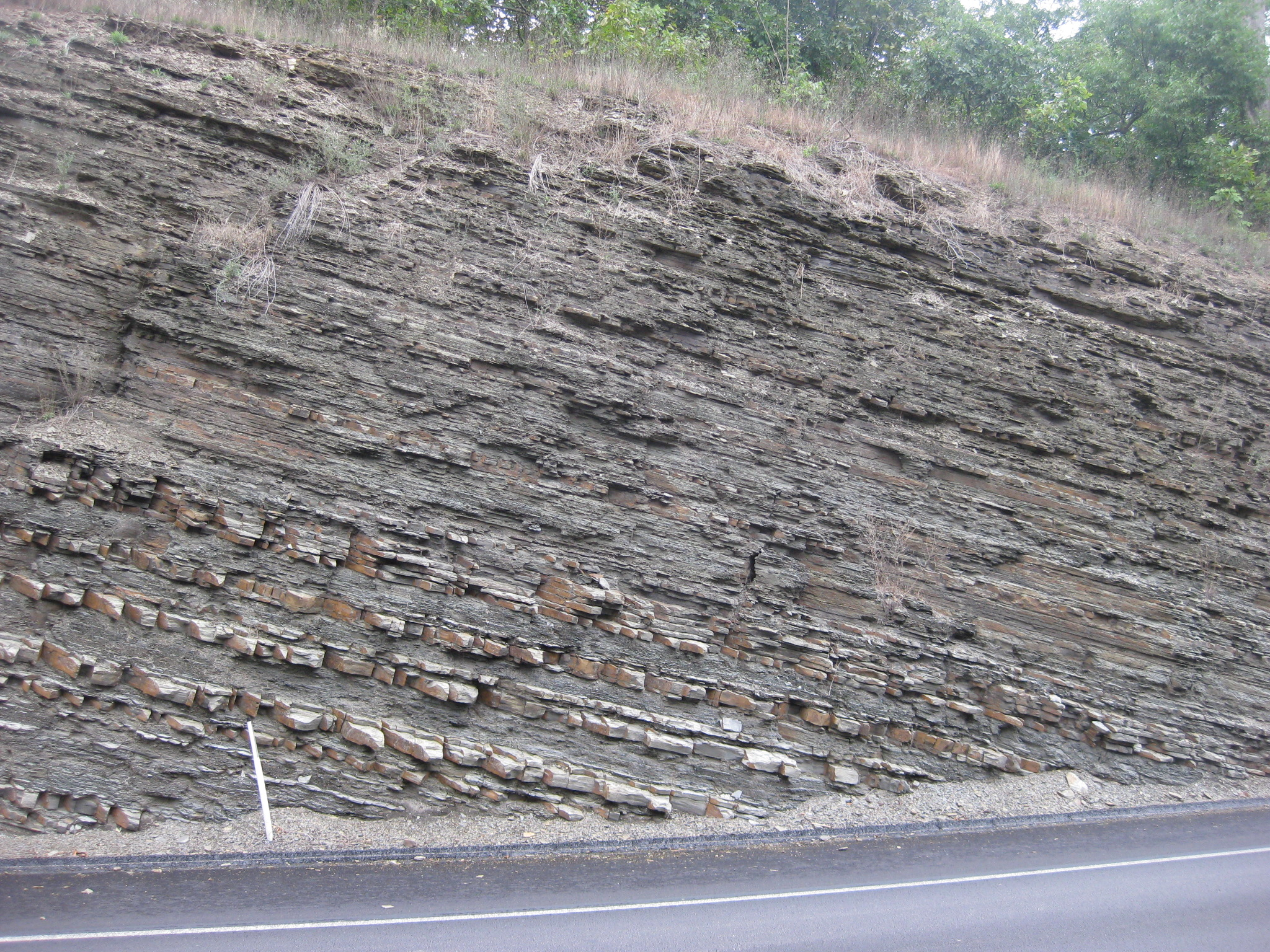
- Outcrop of Brallier Formation on north side of Pennsylvania Turnpike, central Bedford County, near Mile Marker 138
- Type: sedimentary
- Sub-units: Black Creek Siltstone Member, Minnehaha Springs Member
- Underlies: Greenland Gap Group and Scherr Formation
- Overlies: Harrell Formation
- Thickness: 1350 to 1800 feet in central PA

Lithology
- Primary: shale, sandstone

Location
- Region: Appalachian Mountains
- Country: United States
- Extent: Maryland, Pennsylvania, Virginia, and West Virginia

Type section
- Named by: Charles Butts, 1918

The Devonian Brallier Formation is a mapped bedrock unit in Pennsylvania, Maryland, West Virginia, and Virginia in the United States.

== Description ==
The Brallier Formation was described by Charles Butts in 1918 as a fine-grained, siliceous shale with few fine-grained sandstone layers, from outcrops in central Pennsylvania. Others expanded usage of the term to rocks in other states.

=== Stratigraphy ===
The Brallier is roughly equivalent to the Scherr Formation.

The contact with the underlying Harrell Formation is generally gradational.

=== Fossils ===
Hasson and Dennison reported the following fossils from outcrops of the lower Brallier at Keyser, West Virginia, Ridgeville, West Virginia, and McCoole, Maryland:

- Bivalvia: Buchiola retrostriata, Paracardium doris, Pterochaenia fragilis
- Cephalopoda: Bactrites, Orthoceras filosum
- Cricoconarida: Styliolina fissurella
- Annelida: Pteridichnites biseriatus

=== Notable Exposures ===
Type locality is at a railway station 6 miles northeast of Everett, Bedford County, Pennsylvania.

A large exposure is located in Huntingdon, Pennsylvania, along the ramp from U.S. Route 22 west to Route 26 north.

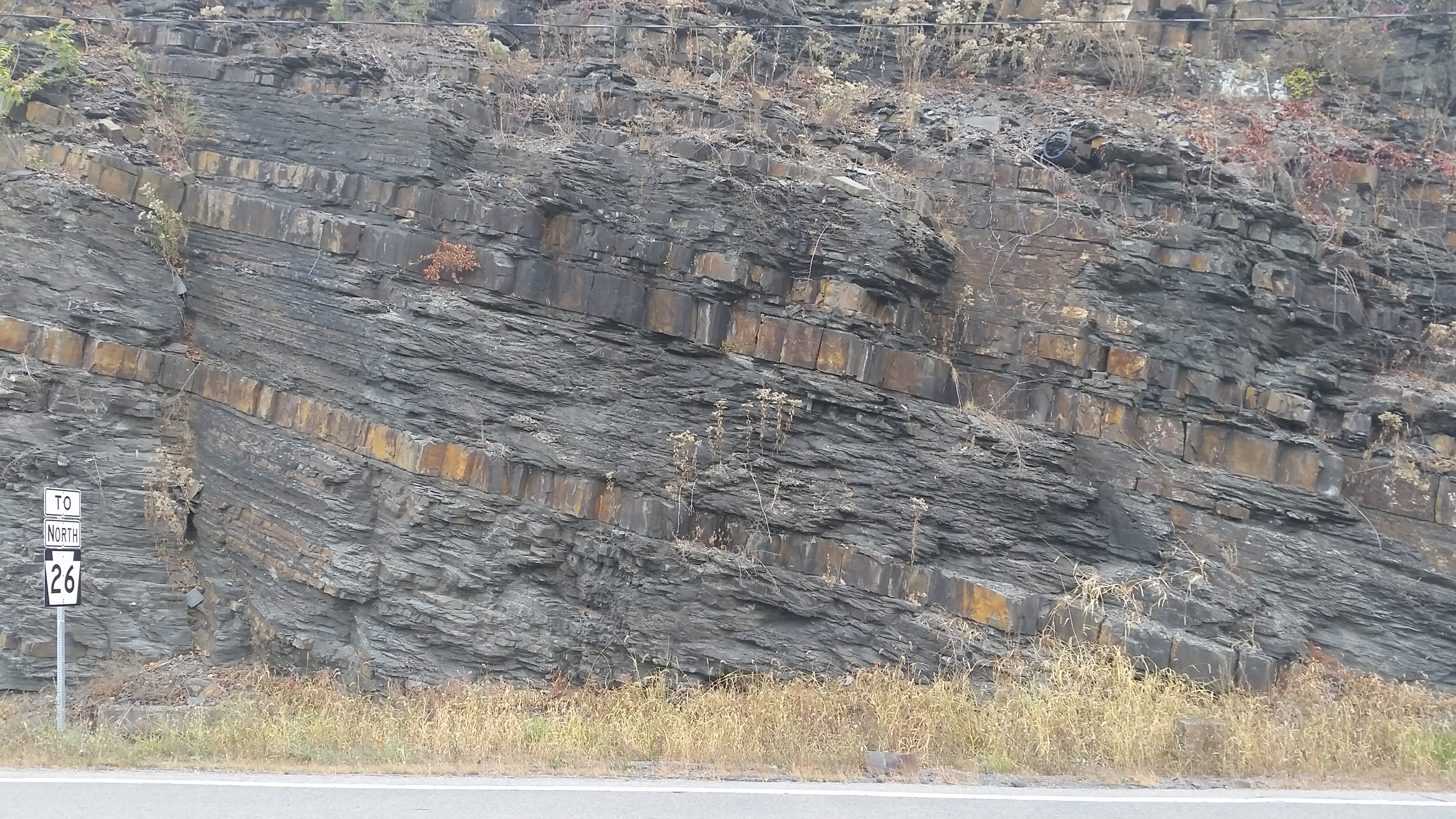
Part of the exposure at Huntingdon (2017)

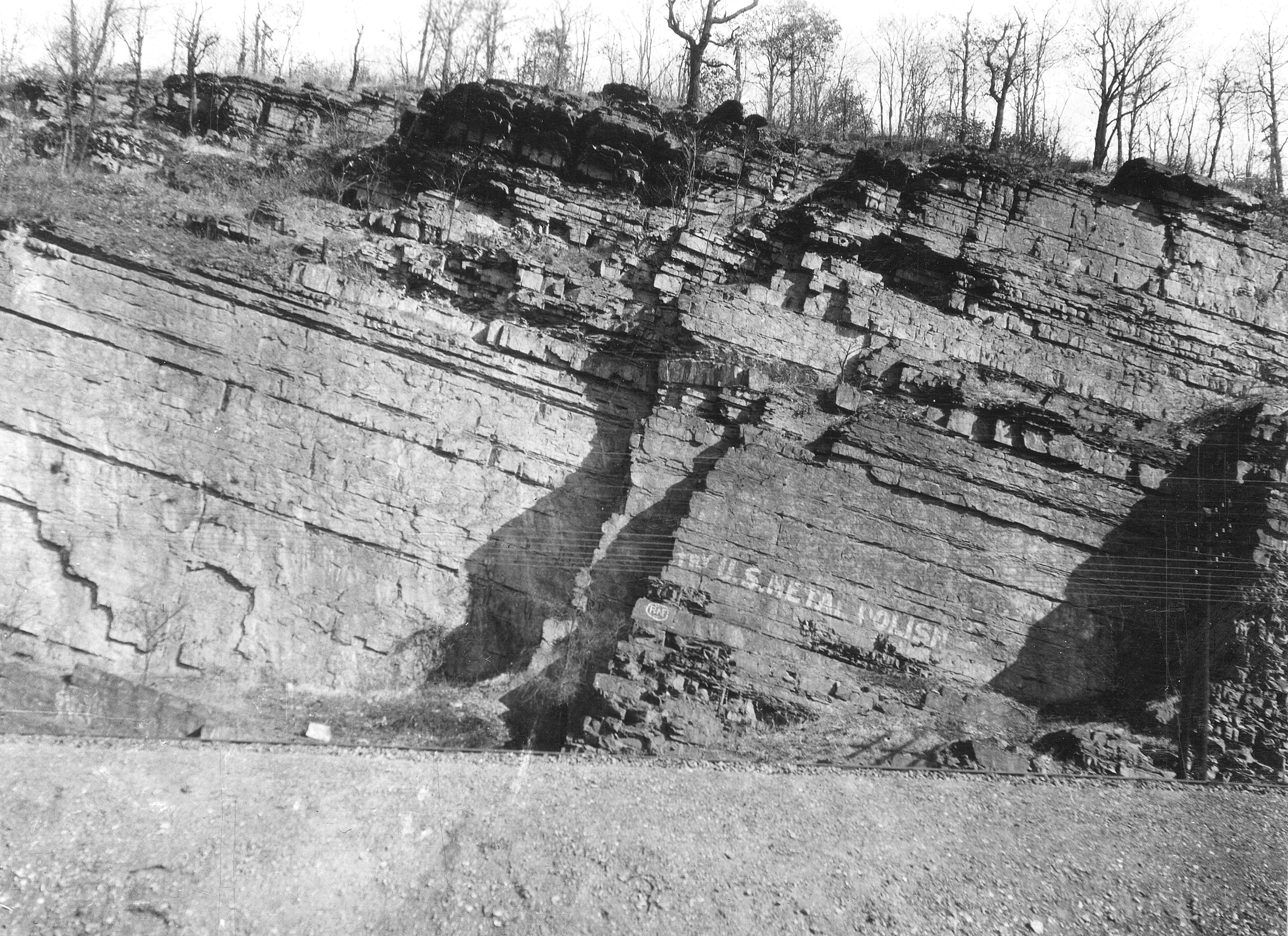
Another view at Huntingdon (1924)

Another good exposure is on the Pennsylvania Railroad bed just west of Altoona, Pennsylvania.

== Age ==
Relative age dating places the Brallier in the late Devonian.
