= List of power stations in West Virginia =

Sources of West Virginia utility-scale electricity generation in gigawatt-hours, full-year 2025:
1. Coal: 46,636 (86.9%)
2. Natural gas: 3,314 (6.18%)
3. Wind: 1,991 (3.71%)
4. Hydroelectric: 1,285 (2.40%)
5. Solar: 264 (0.49%)
6. Petroleum: 142 (0.26%)
7. Other gases: 17 (0.03%)

This is a list of electricity-generating power stations in the U.S. state of West Virginia, sorted by type and name. In 2024, West Virginia had a total summer capacity of 15.1 GW through all of its power plants, and a net generation of 50,594 GWh. In 2025, the electrical energy generation mix was 86.9% coal, 6.2% natural gas, 3.7% wind, 2.4% hydroelectric, 0.5% solar, 0.3% petroleum, and less than 0.1% other gases.

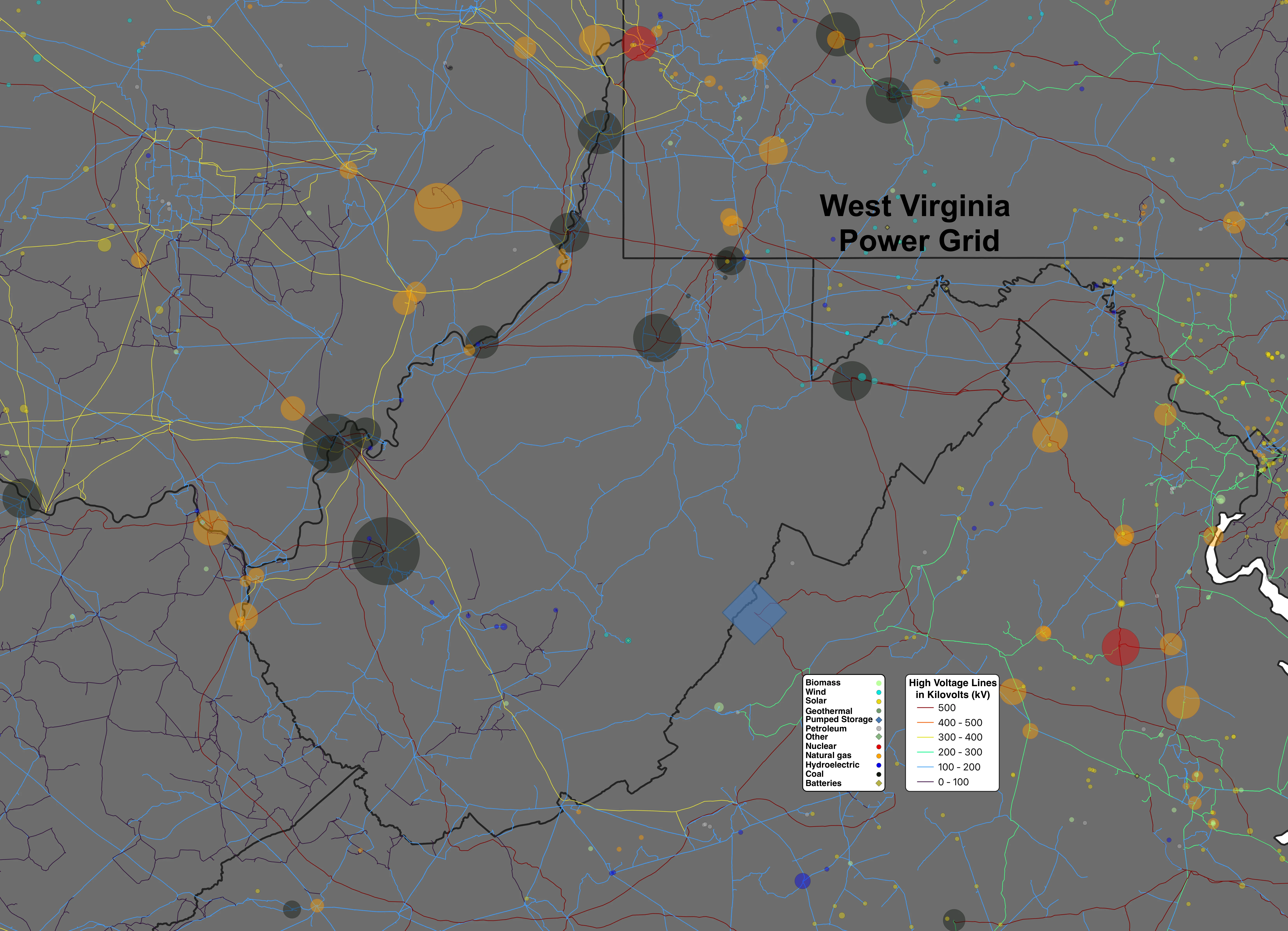
West Virginia power grid

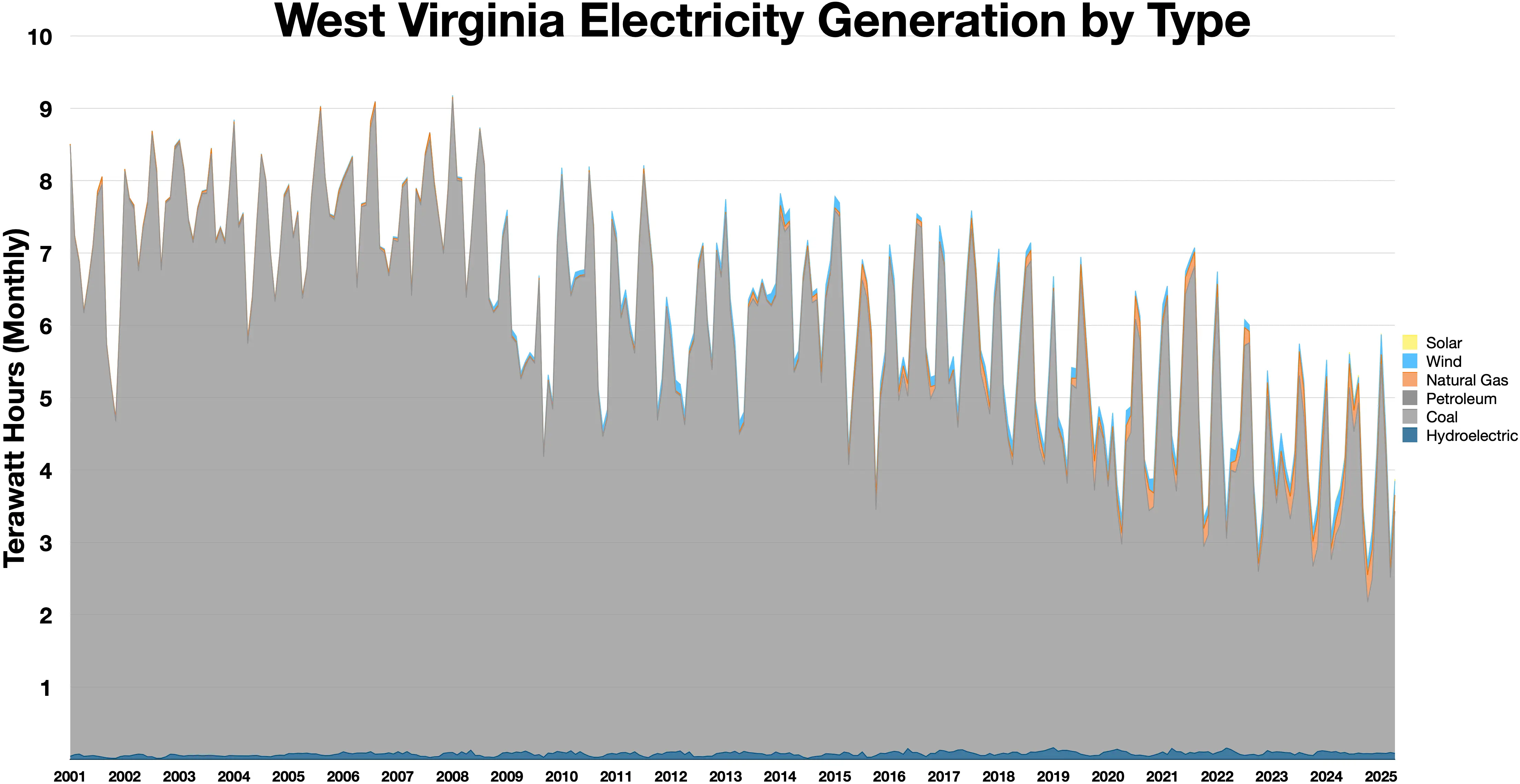
West Virginia electricity generation by type

== Fossil-fuel power stations ==
Data from the U.S. Energy Information Administration.

=== Coal ===
Plant	Location	Coordinates	Capacity (MW)	Year opened	Ref
Fort Martin Power Station	Monongalia County	39°42′39″N 79°55′39″W	1,098	1967 (Unit 1 - 552MW); 1968 (Unit 2 - 546MW)	
Grant Town Power Plant	Marion County	39°33′42″N 80°09′47″W	80	1992	
Harrison Power Station	Harrison County	39°23′03″N 80°19′57″W	1,954	1972 (Unit 1 - 652MW); 1973 (Unit 2 - 651MW); 1974 (Unit 3 - 651MW)	
John E. Amos Power Plant	Putnam County	38°28′23″N 81°49′24″W	2,900	1971 (Unit 1 - 800MW); 1972 (Unit 2 - 800MW); 1973 (Unit 3 - 1300MW)	
Longview Power Plant	Monongalia County	39°42′28″N 79°57′32″W	710	2011	
Mitchell Power Plant	Marshall County	39°49′47″N 80°48′55″W	1,560	1971 (Unit 1 - 770MW); 1971 (Unit 2 - 790MW)	
Morgantown Energy Facility	Monongalia County	39°38′23″N 79°57′38″W	50	1991	
Mountaineer Power Plant	Mason County	38°58′46″N 81°56′04″W	1,299	1980	
Mount Storm Power Station	Grant County	39°12′03″N 79°15′49″W	1,629	1965 (Unit 1 - 554MW); 1966 (Unit 2 - 555MW); 1973 (Unit 3 - 520MW)	
Pleasants Power Station	Pleasants County	39°22′00″N 81°17′40″W	1,288	1979 (Unit 1 - 644MW); 1980 (Unit 2 - 644MW)	

=== Natural gas ===
Plant	Location	Coordinates	Capacity (MW)	Generation type	Year opened	Ref
Axiall Natrium Plant	Marshall County	39°44′51″N 80°51′17″W	115.5	Steam turbine (x3)	1943 (7.5MW); 1954 (26MW); 1966 (82MW)	
Big Sandy Peaker Plant	Wayne County	38°20′39″N 82°35′38″W	300	Simple cycle (x6)	2001	
Ceredo Generating Station	Wayne County	38°22′05″N 82°32′02″W	450	Simple cycle (x6)	2001	
Pleasants Energy LLC	Pleasants County	39°19′57″N 81°21′51″W	343.4	Simple cycle (x2)	2002	

=== Petroleum ===
Plant	Location	Coordinates	Capacity (MW)	Generation type	Year opened	Ref
Mt Storm	Grant County	39°12′03″N 79°15′49″W	11.0	Simple cycle	1967	

== Renewable power stations ==
Data from the U.S. Energy Information Administration serves as a general reference.

=== Biomass & refuse ===
Name	Location	Coordinates	Capacity (MW)	Fuel type	Generation type	Year opened	Ref
New River Clean Energy	Raleigh County	37°48′57″N 81°09′43″W	3.2	Landfill gas	Reciprocating engine (x2)	2017	

=== Hydroelectric ===
Plant	Location	Coordinates	Capacity (MW)	Number of turbines	Year opened	Ref
Belleville Dam	Wood County	39°07′09″N 81°44′15″W	42.0	2	1999	
Dam No. 4 Hydro	Jefferson County	39°29′35″N 77°49′37″W	1.9	3	1909/1991	
Dam No. 5 Hydro	Berkeley County	39°36′18″N 77°55′23″W	1.0	2	1919	
Gauley River Power Partners	Nicholas County	38°13′09″N 80°53′26″W	80.0	2	2001	
Glen Ferris Hydro	Fayette County	38°08′54″N 81°12′53″W	6.2	8	1912/1917	
Hawks Nest Hydro	Fayette County	38°08′52″N 81°10′31″W	96.8	4	1936	
London Hydro	Kanawha County	38°11′40″N 81°22′14″W	14.4	3	1935	
Marmet Hydro	Kanawha County	38°15′09″N 81°34′10″W	14.4	3	1935	
Millville Hydro Station	Jefferson County	39°16′23″N 77°47′04″W	2.4	3	1913/ 1938/1939	
New Martinsville Hannibal Hydro	Wetzel County	39°40′02″N 80°51′51″W	19.0	2	1988	
Willow Island Hydroelectric Plant	Pleasants County	39°21′28″N 81°19′05″W	44.0	2	2016	
Winfield Hydro	Putnam County	38°31′39″N 81°54′50″W	24.5	3	1938	

=== Wind ===
Project name	Location	Coordinates	Capacity (MW)	Number of turbines	Year opened	Ref
Beech Ridge Energy (I&II)	Greenbrier County	38°05′16″N 80°29′33″W	156.5	87	2010/2020	
Laurel Mountain Wind	Barbour County	39°00′26″N 79°53′12″W	97.6	61	2011	
NedPower Mount Storm (I&II)	Grant County	39°13′03″N 79°12′34″W	264.0	132	2008	
Mountaineer Wind Energy Center	Tucker County	39°10′58″N 79°32′14″W	66.0	44	2002	
New Creek Wind	Grant County	39°12′02″N 79°08′26″W	103.0	49	2016	
Pinnacle Wind Force	Mineral County	39°26′42″N 79°01′48″W	55.2	23	2011	

=== Solar ===
West Virginia had no utility-scale solar facilities in 2019.

== Storage power stations ==
Data from the U.S. Energy Information Administration serves as a general reference.

=== Battery storage ===
Name	Location	Coordinates	Discharge capacity (MW)	Year opened	Ref
AEP Milton NaS	Cabell County	38°21′44″N 82°07′32″W	2.0	2009	
Beech Ridge Energy Storage	Greenbrier County	38°05′16″N 80°29′33″W	31.5	2015	
Laurel Mountain Hybrid	Barbour County	39°00′26″N 79°53′12″W	16.0	2011	

== See also ==
- List of power stations in the United States
