= Economy of West Virginia =

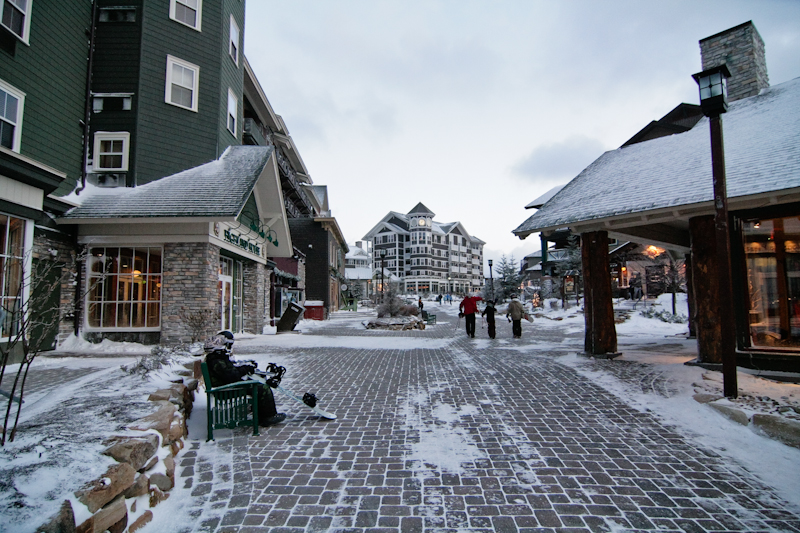
The Village at Snowshoe Mountain in Pocahontas County. Tourism is a large industry in the state.

In 2021, the gross state product of West Virginia was $72.48 billion, an increase from $69.71 billion in the previous year. West Virginia's unemployment rate in August 2019 was 4.6%, the lowest since the start of the Great Recession. As a result of the COVID-19 pandemic, West Virginia's unemployment rate rose to 6.1% in December 2020. By November 2022, the unemployment rate returned to its pre-pandemic level of 4.1%.

== Overview ==
In 2009, the economy of West Virginia was projected to be the 62nd largest economy globally, placed behind Iraq and ahead of Croatia, according to the 2009 World Bank projections. It was also projected to be the 64th largest economy behind Iraq and ahead of Libya according to 2009 International Monetary Fund projections. The state had a projected nominal GDP of $63.34 billion in 2009 according to the Bureau of Economic Analysis report of November 2010, and a real GDP of $55.04 billion. The real GDP growth of the state in 2009 of 0.7% was the 7th best in the country. West Virginia was one of ten states in 2009 with economic growth.

In 2009, while per capita income growth fell 2.6% nationally, West Virginia's rose at 1.8%. Through the first half of 2010, exports from West Virginia topped $3 billion, growing 39.5% over the same period from the previous year and ahead of the national average by 15.7%.

Personal income growth in West Virginia during 2013 was only 1.5%—the lowest in the nation—and about half the national average of 2.6%. Overall income growth in West Virginia over the last 30-year period ending in 2013 was only 13% (about one-third of the national average of 37%). Wages of the impoverished bottom 1% income-earners decreased by 3%, compared to the national average, which increased by 19%.

The net corporate income tax rate is 6.5%, while business costs are 13% below the national average.

=== Appalachian Regional Commission ===
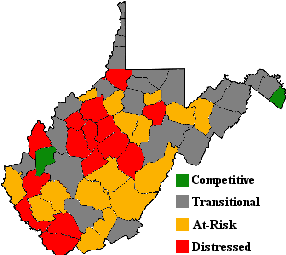
Map showing 2003 ARC economic designations for counties in West Virginia

The Appalachian Regional Commission was formed in 1965 to aid economic development in the Appalachian region, which was lagging far behind the rest of the nation on most economic indicators. The Appalachian region as defined by the Commission includes 420 counties in 13 states, including all 55 counties in West Virginia, the only state whose entire territory is covered by the Appalachian Regional Commission. The Commission gives each county one of five possible economic designations—distressed, at-risk, transitional, competitive, or attainment—with "distressed" counties being the most economically endangered and "attainment" counties being the most economically prosperous. These designations are based primarily on three indicators: three-year average unemployment rate, market income per capita, and poverty rate.

In 2003, West Virginia had a three-year average unemployment rate of 5.7%, compared with 5.5% nationwide. In 2002, West Virginia had a per capita market income of $17,856, compared with $26,420 nationwide. In 2000, West Virginia had a poverty rate of 17.9%, compared to 12.4% nationwide. Fifteen counties in West Virginia were designated "distressed", and sixteen counties were designated "at-risk". No county received the "attainment" designation, and only two (Jefferson and Putnam) were designated "competitive". Nineteen counties were designated "transitional", meaning they lagged behind the national average on one of the three key indicators. McDowell County had West Virginia's highest poverty rating (and the third highest in the entire Appalachian region), with 37.7% of its residents living below the poverty line. Kanawha County had West Virginia's highest per capita income at $25,170, and Monongalia had West Virginia's lowest unemployment rate at 2.7%.

== Industries ==
West Virginia's major economic industries include energy, mining, manufacturing, advanced technologies, healthcare, and tourism. As of 2022, the largest employers in West Virginia are WVU Medicine, Walmart, CAMC Health, Mountain Health Network, Kroger, Lowe's, Contura Energy, Mon Health, American Consolidated Natural Resources, and Mylan Pharmaceuticals.

=== Research and development and advanced tech ===
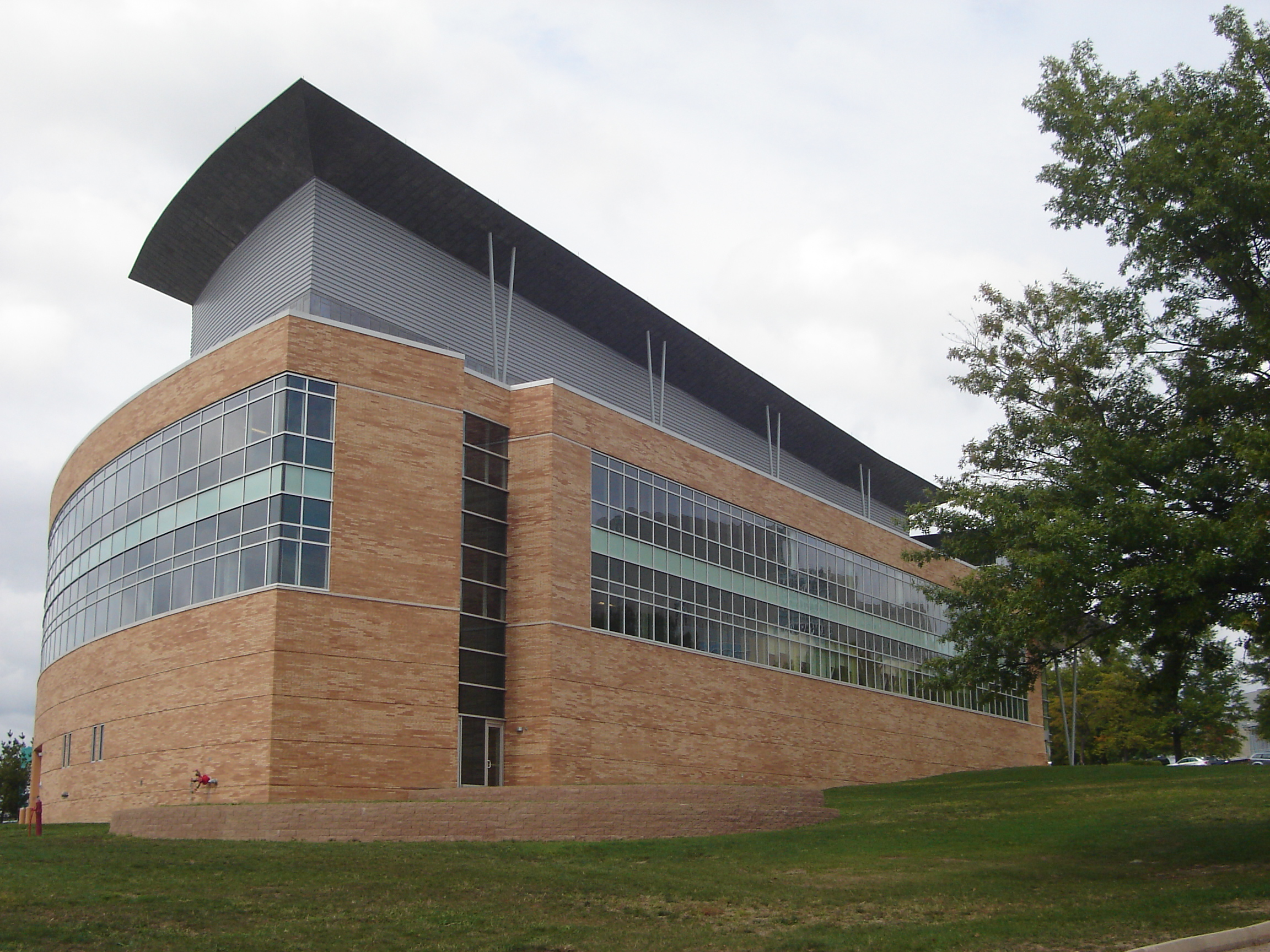
Blanchette Rockefeller Neurosciences Institute at West Virginia University

Through 2008, advanced technology industries employed 45,284 West Virginians, constituting 5.6% of the economic establishments in the state. Through 2007, roughly 5.11% of the total population (91,998 citizens of the state aged 25–44) held bachelor's degrees or higher. West Virginia receives annually around $261 million in federal research and development (R&D) funds, ranking 34th in the nation. Private establishments receiving the most federal R&D contracts in 2009 were Prologic, Inc. based in Fairmont, Security Assistance Corporation, Alliant Techsystems, Inc. in Ridgeley, STS International in Berkeley Springs, and the West Virginia High Technology Consortium Foundation (HTC) also in Fairmont.

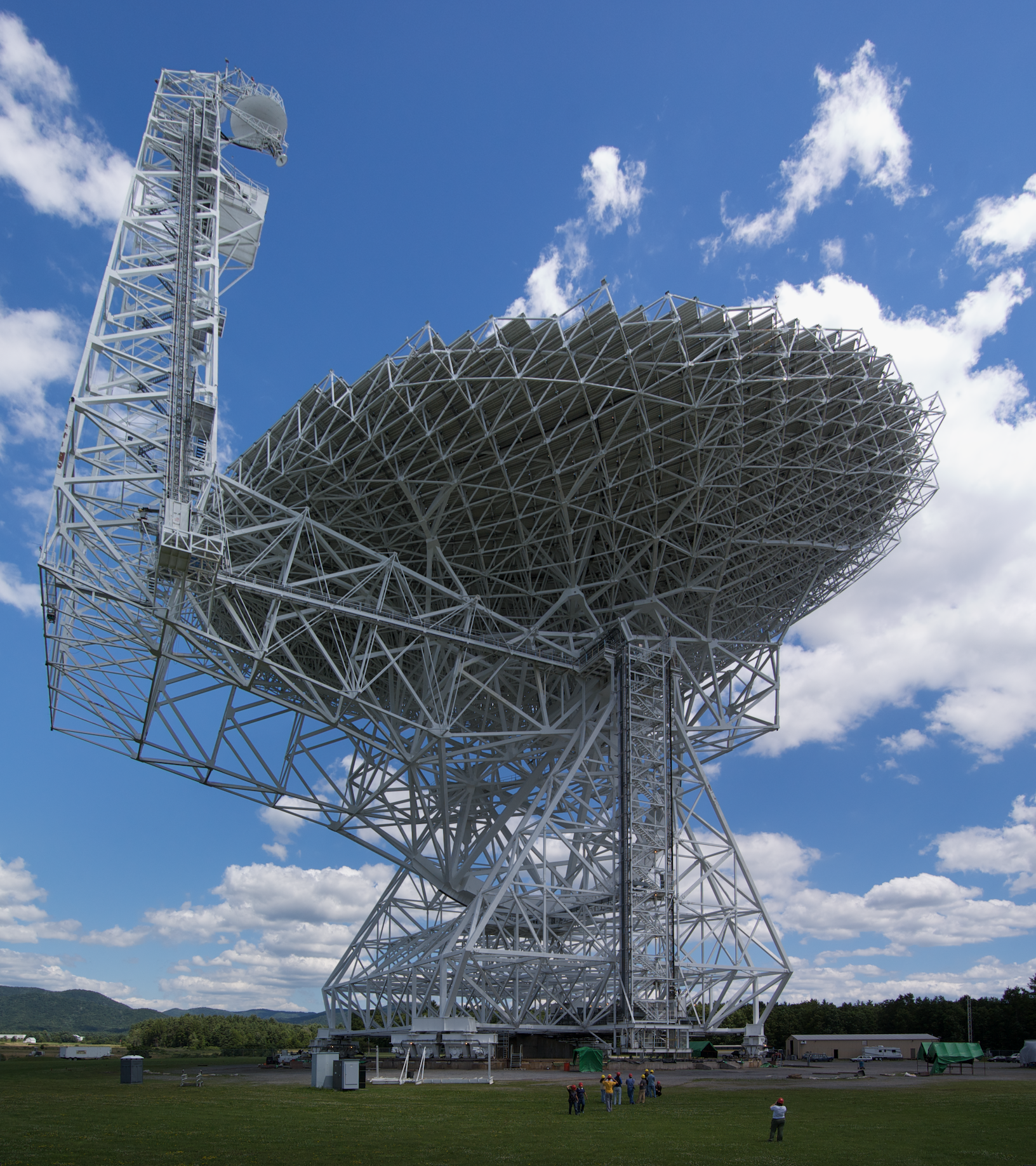
National Radio Astronomy Observatory's Robert C. Byrd Green Bank Telescope in Green Bank

The state is home to federal institutions such as branches of the National Energy Technology Laboratory and Forestry Science Laboratory in Morgantown, the Leetown Science Center and National Center for Cool and Cold Water Aquaculture, National Radio Astronomy Observatory in Green Bank, the Forest Service Timber and Watershed Laboratory in Parsons, the Appalachian Farming Systems Research Center in Beckley, West Virginia District Office of Water Resources in Charleston, and Department of Veterans Affairs R&D units in Clarksburg and Huntington.

West Virginia University is home to research institutions such as the Blanchette Rockefeller Neurosciences Institute, Robert C. Byrd Cancer Research Laboratory, Center for Identification Technology Research, and the National Research Center for Alternative Fuels, Engines, and Emissions.

The Mid-Atlantic Technology, Research, and Innovation Center (MATRIC) is headquartered in South Charleston.

In December 2010, the West Virginia Higher Education Policy Commission began a $23 million renovation of a research park formerly home to the Dow Chemical Company.

=== Energy ===
West Virginia's economy depends heavily on its mineral resources, meaning the declining coal production and low energy prices in recent years have shrunk the state's economy. Mining safety and ecological concerns are also major challenges to West Virginia, which still produces the majority of the coal used in the U.S.

West Virginia is considered a national energy hub, leading the nation in net interstate electricity exports and underground coal mine production, while experiencing a growing natural gas industry as a result of the Great Shale Gas Rush. Overall, it produces 15% of the nation's fossil fuel energy. The state's underground natural gas storage represents 6% of the nation's total, and according to 2008 estimates it has 5.1 billion cubic feet of natural gas reserves overall.

West Virginia was one of the first states to drill for oil. Small to medium oil and natural gas fields still exist and are scattered mostly in the Allegheny Plateau and the Cumberland Plateau in an arc throughout the western part of state. The state produces around 180,000 barrels of oil per month, with 23 million barrels of reserves through 2008 estimates.

The state has a growing renewable energy portfolio, anchored by chemical and biodiesel manufacturer AC & S, based in Nitro.

Some of the largest employers in the state are companies in the energy and mining sectors. In 2009, Columbus-based American Electric Power was the fifth-largest employer in the state, followed by Consolidation Coal Company (#9), Allegheny Energy Service Corporation (#19), Eastern Associated Coal Corporation (#31), and others.

=== Coal ===
Coal is one of the state's primary natural resources, first discovered in the state in 1742. The industry employs 30,000 West Virginians directly, resulting in $2 billion in wages and a $3.5 billion economic impact. West Virginia is the largest coal producer east of the Mississippi River, and accounts for 10% of the nation's production. It leads the nation in coal production from underground mines, and has the nation's second-largest reserves behind Wyoming.

Much of the mined coal is transported on the state's extensive network of railroads. The railways were once one of the largest customers for coal to fuel steam locomotives, but these have been replaced by diesel locomotives. Coal is rarely used now for home heating. Most coal today is used by power plants to produce electricity, both in West Virginia, and in other eastern states.

West Virginia coal exports declined 40% in 2013, representing a decrease of $2.9 billion in export sales. As of 2017, the coal industry accounted for 2% of state employment.

West Virginia has an annual 13 million barrel coal-to-liquid fuel production capacity.

=== Alternative energy ===
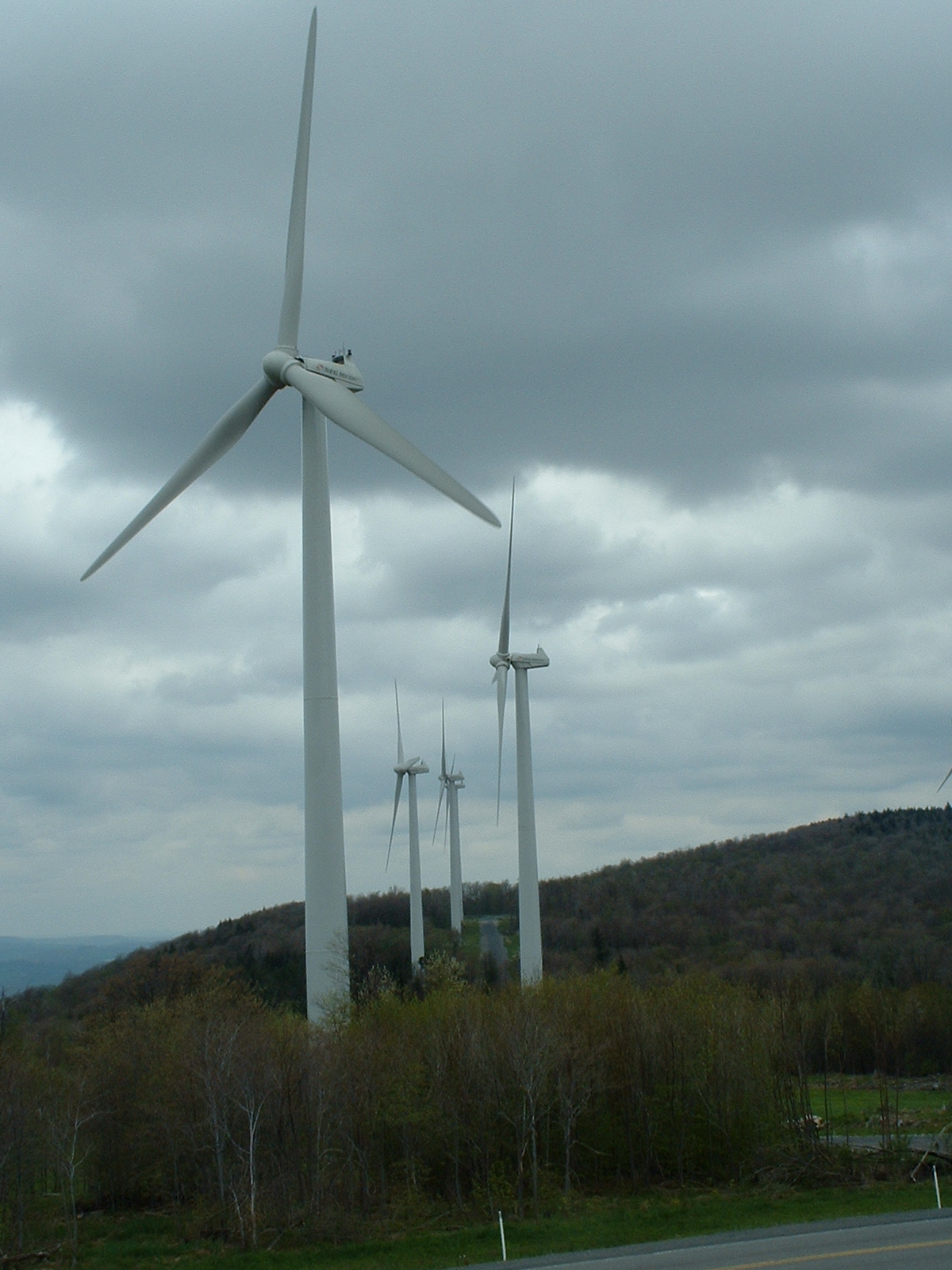
The Mountaineer Wind Energy Center was the first wind farm built in West Virginia, in 2002.

The state has a growing renewable energy portfolio, anchored by chemical and biodiesel manufacturer AC & S, based in Nitro. The National Research Center for Alternative Fuels, Engines, and Emissions is located in Morgantown.

Mountaineer Wind Energy Center, located in Preston County and Tucker County and built in 2002, was the first wind farm in the state. The Beech Ridge Wind Farm is a $300 million, 119 turbine project currently under construction in Greenbrier County. The Mount Storm Wind Farm is located in Grant County and operates 132 turbines.

West Virginia is home to several hydroelectric facilities, including Honeywood Dam on the Potomac River, Cheat Lake Dam in Monongalia County, and Summersville Dam on the Gauley River.

Google has invested in research exploration of the state's geothermal reserves.

=== Aerospace ===
Major aerospace employers in the state include Pratt and Whitney located in Bridgeport, Lockheed Martin in Clarksburg, United Technologies in Union, Canada-based Bombardier Aerospace in Bridgeport, Alliant Techsystems, FCX Systems in Morgantown, and FMW Composite Systems and Aurora Flight Sciences of West Virginia in Bridgeport.

=== Healthcare and education ===
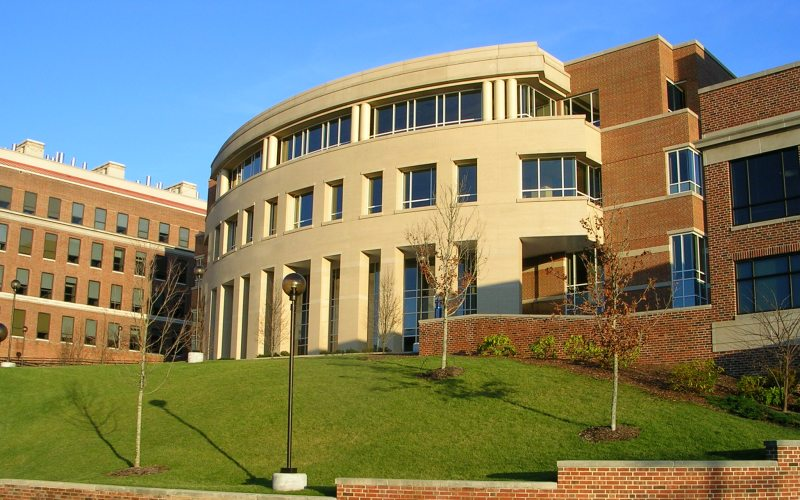
West Virginia University in Morgantown had a $2.04 billion economic impact on the state in 2007, creating 21,600 jobs.

In 2009, West Virginia University Healthcare alone had an economic impact of $2.2 billion on the state and was the #23 employer. West Virginia United Health System was the #2 employer in 2009, ahead of Charleston Area Medical Center (#3), St. Mary's Hospital (#7), Cabell Huntington Hospital, Inc. (#12), Wheeling Hospital (#14), and Camden-Clark Memorial Hospital (#24).

In 2008, public higher education institutions had a $7.9 billion economic impact on the state, creating 40,600 employment positions. Private higher education institutions had a $345 million economic impact on the state in 2004, creating 6,258.

=== Chemicals and materials ===
Heavy industry is concentrated along the western edges of the state, where the large rivers of the mid-continent erode a distance into the hills. In the Kanawha River Valley near Charleston and along the southern Ohio River Valley near Huntington, chemical manufacturers predominate, attracted by a readily available labor force and access by barge carriers.

The state has one of the nation's highest concentrations of chemical supply and generic pharmaceutical industries. Notable national corporations include DuPont, PPG Industries, Dow Chemical Company, Mylan (founded in White Sulphur Springs), Ashland Specialty Chemical, Flexsys, and Texas-based Alcon. Additionally, the state is home to international companies, notably BASF, Bayer, and Stockmeyer Kunststoffe GmbH (Germany), a subsidiary of Kureha (Japan), and Braskem (Brazil). The state is a global chemical hub, cited by the Council of American States in Europe as one of North America's premier destinations. West Virginia has 80% community acceptance from the chemical industry nationwide, one of the highest in the nation. The chemicals industry accounts for one-fifth of manufacturing sector jobs and nearly 40% of the manufacturing sector's economic output in West Virginia.

Metallurgy, especially steel production, has been predominant in West Virginia's northern panhandle due to a spill-over effect from the traditional center of the US steel industry in Pittsburgh. The state is home to steel and metal companies such as Luxembourg-based ArcelorMittal in Weirton, Special Metals Corporation and Steel of West Virginia Inc. in Huntington, Russia-based Severstal and Japan-based Nisshin Inc. in Wheeling, Follansbee Steel in Follansbee, and Swanson Industries in Morgantown. In December 2010, Russia-based Mechel announced plans to construct a new $12 million coal processing plant in McDowell County.

It is home to one of the highest concentration of resin producers in the world. General Electric Plastics is located in Washington.

=== Federal government ===
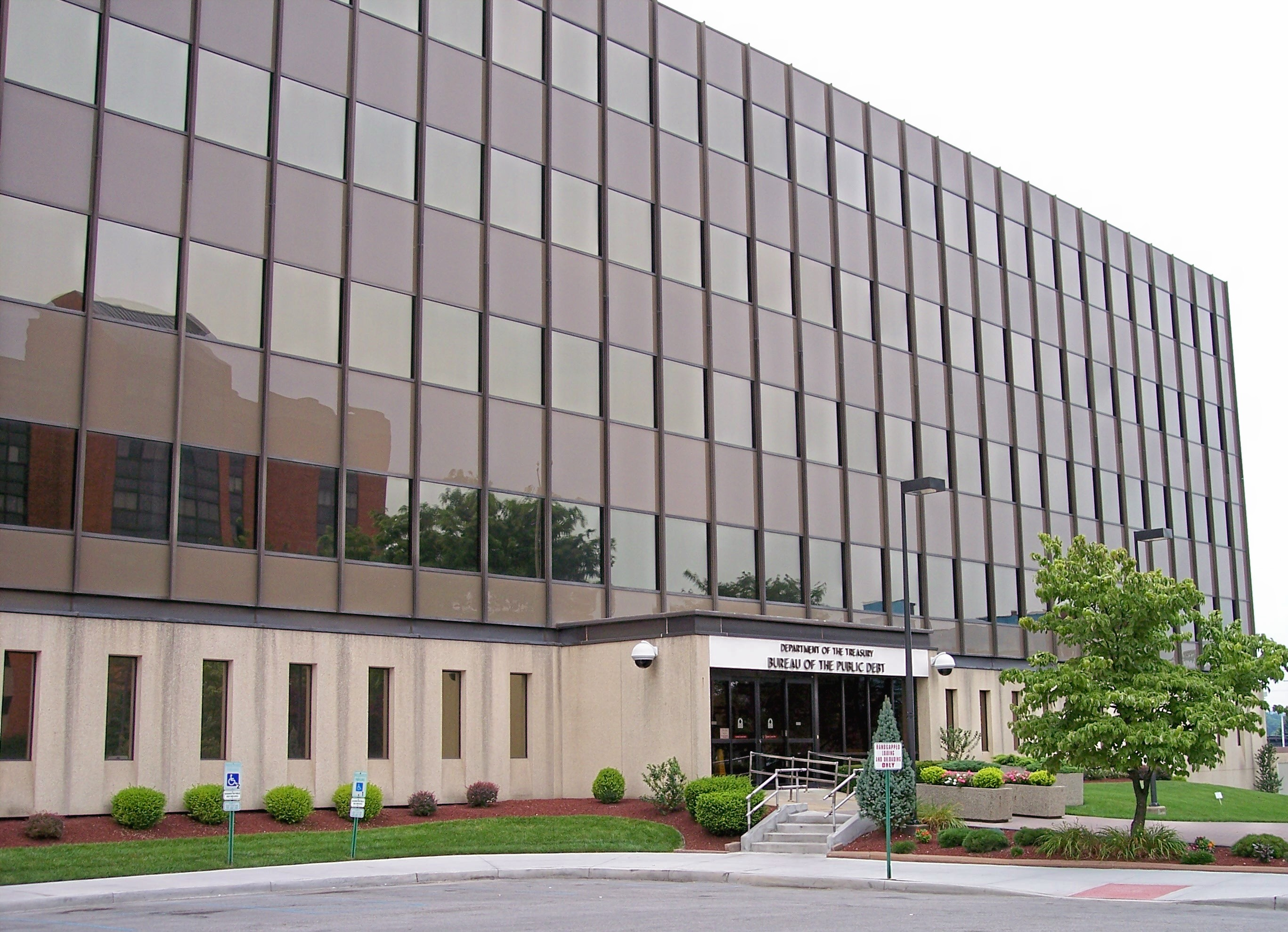
One of Bureau of the Public Debt's several buildings in downtown Parkersburg

The FBI's Criminal Justice Information Services Division is located in Clarksburg, NASA's Independent Verification and Validation Facility in Fairmont, and the U.S. Department of Treasury's Bureau of the Public Debt is located in Parkersburg.

=== Automotive ===
Between 1990 and 2004, the state experienced $1 billion in investment in the sector and 1500+ new employment positions. It is home to major automotive operations such as Japan-based Toyota in Buffalo, and others including Diamond Electric in Eleanor since 1996 (in 2014 Diamond moved their North American headquarters to West Virginia), NGK Spark Plugs in Sissonville, and Italy-based Sogefi and Japan-based Okuno International in Prichard.

=== Manufacturing, printing, retail, and hospitality ===
West Virginia's largest manufacturing employer is Viatris, followed by Toyota, Northrop Grumman and several other Fortune 500 companies that operate facilities in West Virginia, with Owens & Minor, Clorox, and Commercial Metals Company breaking ground and expanding into the state during 2022.

In December 2010, Ohio-based Macy's announced plans to construct a 1.3 million square foot, $150 million distribution center in Berkeley County, creating 1,900 jobs. Manufacturing operations also include Homer Laughlin China Company in Newell, Blenko Glass Company in Milton, Champion Industries in Huntington, Gabriel Brothers in Morgantown, MTR Gaming Group is Chester, and PNGI Charles Town Gaming.

=== Media and telecommunications ===
Major media entities in the state include Marquee Cinemas, which operates theatres from Connecticut to Florida, West Virginia Media Holdings, West Virginia Radio Corporation in Morgantown, West Virginia MetroNews, and Ogden Newspapers in Wheeling, which operates publications ranging to Hawaii, Florida, Minnesota, and New York.

Terradon Communications Group, located in Poca, is a leader in website design and development, with clients including Whirlpool International. Others include Texas-based Aegis Group.

=== Tourism ===
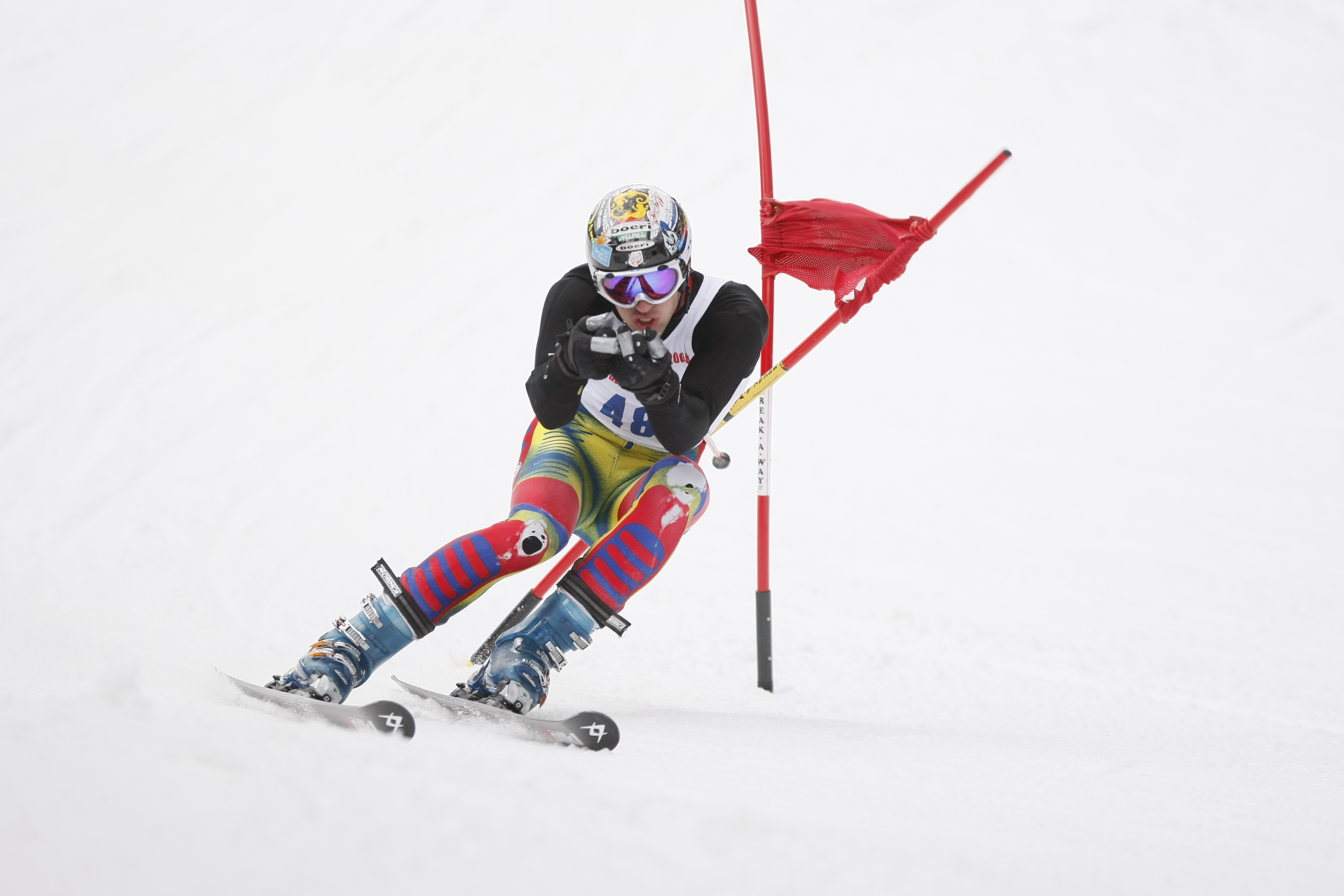
A giant slalom competitor at a USCSA event for the Southeastern Conference at Snowshoe Mountain

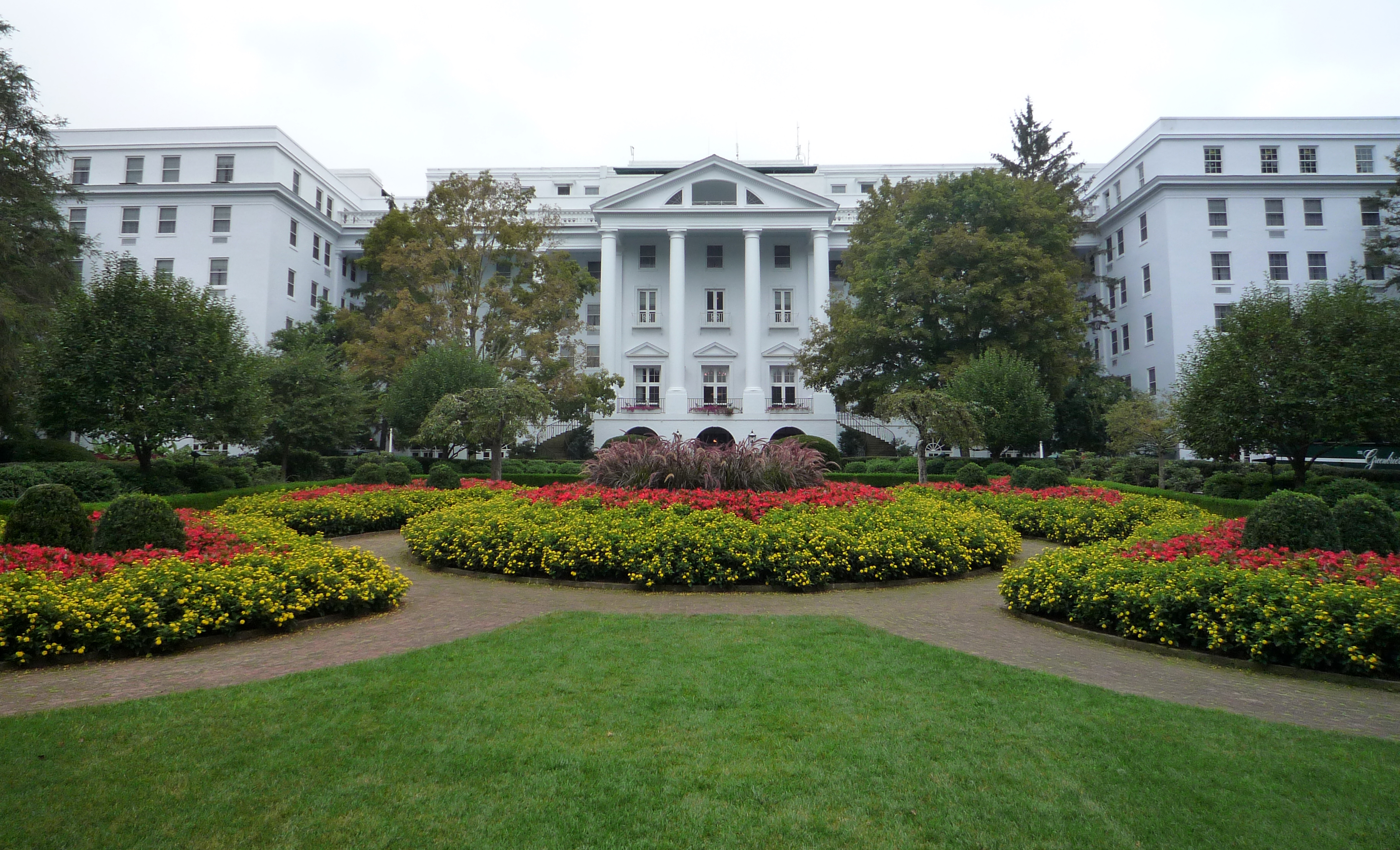
The Greenbrier located in White Sulphur Springs once housed the emergency bunker of the U.S. Congress.

In 2010, tourism generated an economic impact of $4.27 billion and 44,400 employment positions. Major tourist attractions include the state's premier skiing destinations such as Snowshoe Mountain, Canaan Valley, Winterplace Ski Resort, Oblebay Resort, Elk River Touring Center, and White Grass Ski Touring Center. Other attractions are included in the following table.

Museums, institutes	Parks, recreation	Entertainment, music
Huntington Museum of Art; Mountain Quest Institute in Pocahontas County; Avampato Discovery Museum in Charleston; Oglebay Institute in Wheeling; West Virginia Zoo	West Virginia State Wildlife Center in French Creek; Greenbrier Resort; Pete Dye Golf Club; Samuel Taylor Suit Cottage; Blennerhassett Island Historical State Park; Moncove Lake State Park; Camden Park in Huntington; Prickett's Fort State Park; Blackwater Falls State Park; West Virginia wine region	Mountaineer Race Track & Gaming Resort in Chester; Mardi Gras Casino and Resort; Wheeling Island Racetrack & Gaming Center; Hollywood Casino-Charlestown; Scottish Heritage Festival in Bridgeport; Italian Heritage Festival; Vandalia Gathering in Charleston; Appalachian String Band Music Festival; West Virginia Coal Festival in Madison; Johnny Johnson Blues and Jazz Festival; Music in the Mountains Bluegrass Festival; Appalachian Festival in Raleigh County; BBQ & Bluegrass Festival

=== Agriculture and forestry ===
Farming is practiced throughout West Virginia, but in a form different from large extensive cash-crop agriculture elsewhere in the USA. The modal average farm size is relatively small, at 154 acres. Family and single-owner operation constituted 92.7% of the farms, and an astounding 96.9% were totally or partly owned by the operator. On the other hand, only 50.5% of the state's farmers considered farming to be their primary occupation, with a significant number of hours worked elsewhere each year. The rural poverty rate in West Virginia is 20.4%, five points higher than the urban poverty rate.

This description of farming portrays an independent and self-sufficient base of small landowners, but also a significant amount of rural poverty.

As can be expected in a rugged terrain, raising animals was far more important than growing vegetative crops. Income from animals exceeded income from plants by about 7 to 1, with much of the non-animal income derived from sales of fodder. The chief animals raised were cattle and chickens.

In the ridge and valley area along the eastern border near Virginia's Shenandoah Valley, subsidiary valleys are wide and there are some belts of rich soil which are extensively farmed. In 2002, all of the top five counties by agricultural dollar value were located near the eastern Virginia border.

Historically, traditional frontier agriculture relied on gathering wild "greens" and other vegetation to supplement the diet. One continuation of this practice is the gathering of wild North American ginseng, often for the Asian market. Wild gathered ginseng contributed about $2 million in 2000 to the West Virginia economy, a figure larger than many conventional cultivated vegetable and fruit crops. Other wild greens, such as sour dock, lambs quarters, and wild leek (or "ramps"), are also still gathered by many for table use, although today more on the basis of avocation or keeping up traditions than out of necessity.

Forestry-based industries employ 15,600 West Virginians through major corporations such as Atlanta-based Georgia Pacific in Mount Hope, Seattle-based Weyerhauser in Heaters, North Carolina-based Coastal Lumber with several locations throughout the state, Virginia-based American Woodmark in Moorefield, and Pittsburgh-based Babcock Lumber Company with multiple locations throughout the state.

=== Banking ===
Due to the rural demographics in West Virginia, the state is not dominated by any major U.S. banks. In fact, the only Big Four bank with any retail banking presence in the state is JP Morgan Chase, and only in the Charleston area. WesBanco is the largest bank in the state, and the only major bank with a presence throughout the state. City National Bank (West Virginia) also has a significant presence in several areas in West Virginia. Other major banks in the state, but only in certain areas, include Chase, Fifth Third Bank in Charleston, and PNC Financial Services in Morgantown.
