= Solar power in West Virginia =

Electricity from sunlight in one U.S. state

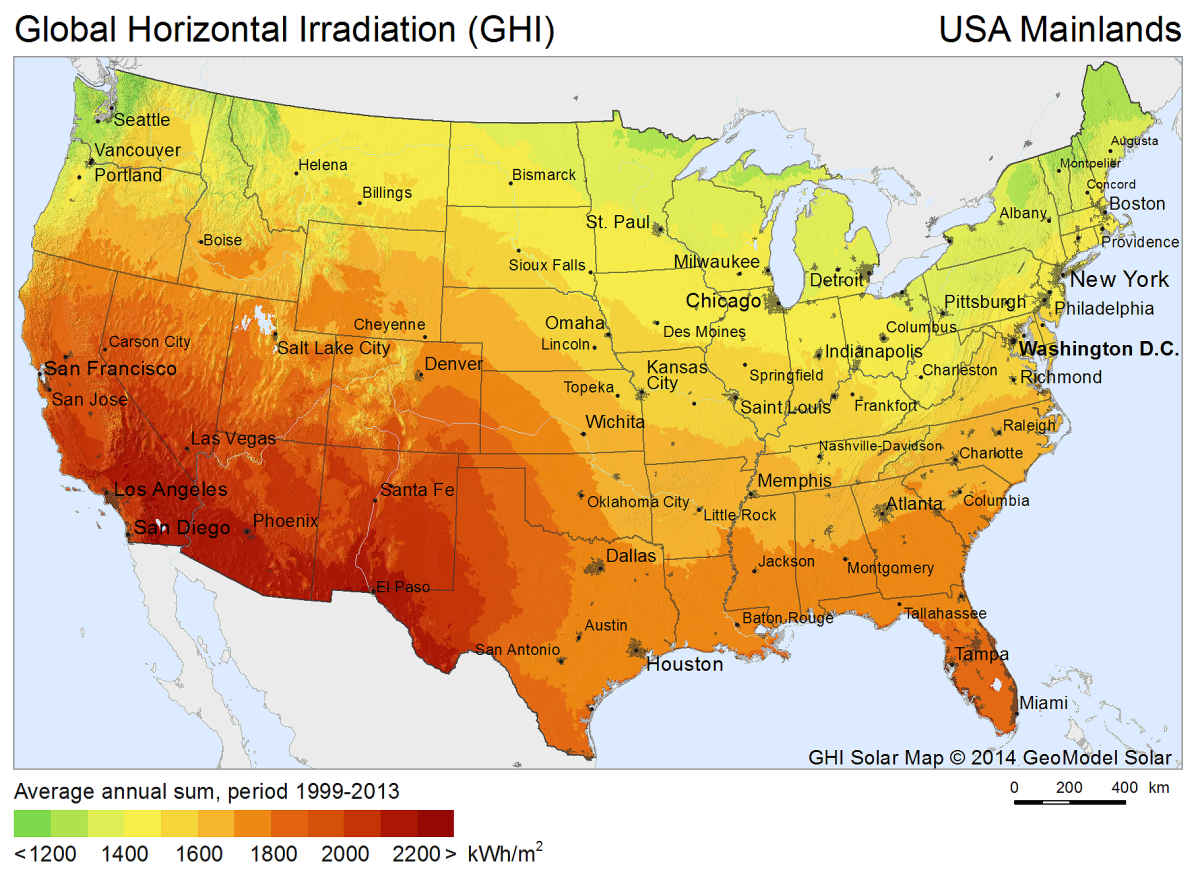
US solar potential

Solar power in West Virginia on rooftops can provide 23% of all electricity used in West Virginia from 6,300 MW of solar panels, but West Virginia will be the last state in the United States to reach grid parity - the point where solar panels are cheaper than grid electricity - without incentives, due to the low cost of electricity - about $0.062/kWh. The point where grid parity is reached is a product of the average insolation and the average cost of electricity. At $0.062/kWh and 4.3 sun-hours/day, solar panels would need to come down to ~$1,850/kW installed to achieve grid parity. The first state in the US to achieve grid parity was Hawaii. Solar power's favorable carbon footprint compared to fossil fuels is a major motivation for expanding renewable energy in the state, especially when compared to coal to generate electrical power.

Net metering is available continuously to residential consumers generating up to 25 kW and up to 2 MW for industrial users but is limited to 3% of peak demand the previous year. In addition to the 30% federal tax credit, West Virginia has a 30% tax credit, but unlike the federal credit, is limited to $2,000. A $7,000 system can therefore be installed for $2,900.

== Installations ==
In 2012 the largest solar array in West Virginia was the 407 kW array installed on a carport at the American Public University System financial center in Charles Town, which includes 15 charging stations for electric cars.

In Moorefield, West Virginia, Malcolm Farms had generated 35,000 kWh annually as of January 2014 from a solar installation on a poultry house.

== Statistics ==
Source: NREL

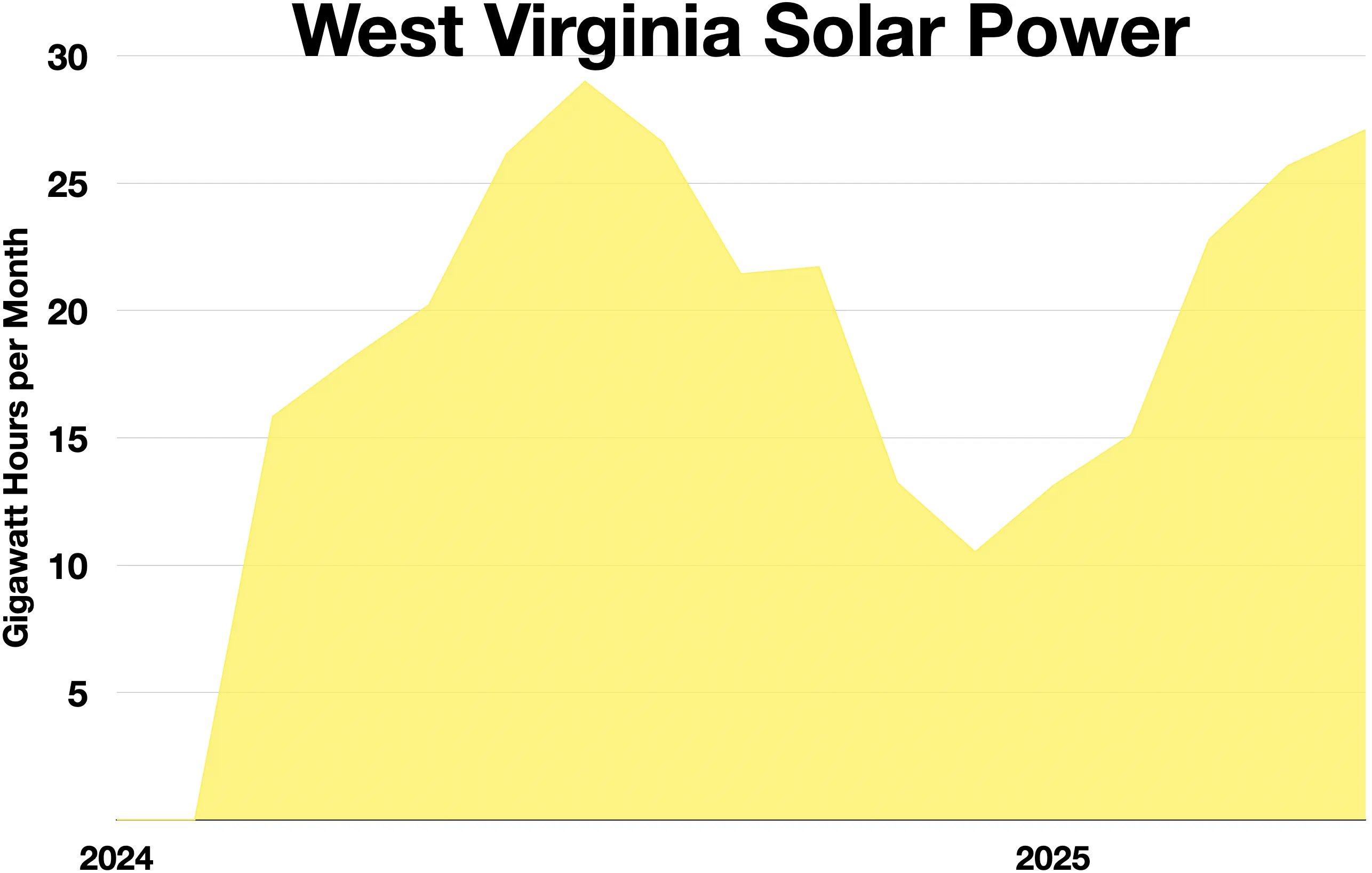
West Virginia solar power

Grid-connected PV capacity (MW)
Year	Capacity	Installed	% change
2010	<0.1	<0.1	
2011	0.6	0.6	0%
2012	1.7	1.1	183%
2013	2.2	0.5	29%
2014	2.6	0.4	18%
2015	3.4	0.8	31%
2016	3.8	0.4	11%
2017	5.8	2	52%
2018	6.9	1.1	19%
2019	9.8	2.9	42%
2020	11.2	1.4	14%
2021	18.2	7	63%
2022	30	11.8	65%

== See also ==
- Wind power in West Virginia
- Solar power in the United States
- Renewable energy in the United States
