= Wind power in West Virginia =

Electricity from wind in one U.S. state

The U.S. Department of Energy has determined that West Virginia has significant wind power development opportunities, with a potential of 69 gigawatts. As of the start of 2020, there were 376 wind turbines in operation in West Virginia with a generating capacity of 686 megawatts (MW) and responsible for 2.7% of in-state electricity production. An additional 56 MW was under construction.

The state, a major coal producer, passed renewable portfolio standard legislation in 2009, but repealed it in 2015.

== Statistics ==
West Virginia wind generation capacity by year

West Virginia wind generation (GWh, million kWh)
Year	Total	Jan	Feb	Mar	Apr	May	Jun	Jul	Aug	Sep	Oct	Nov	Dec
2002	9												9
2003	171	16	15	17	17	14	10	11	4	12	16	19	20
2004	160	24	17	18	16	12	8	8	4	9	10	15	19
2005	154	14	15	17	16	11	9	5	7	8	12	18	22
2006	173	24	23	16	13	13	6	8	7	10	19	11	23
2007	166	22	20	17	19	9	7	7	5	6	13	19	22
2008	393	22	19	25	20	20	26	19	22	24	56	68	72
2009	744	86	86	69	71	31	49	49	32	46	71	68	86
2010	940	92	79	85	86	66	69	49	33	66	114	89	112
2011	1,103	102	113	112	114	49	62	45	68	60	122	124	132
2012	1,285	201	147	136	130	59	90	85	41	65	98	100	133
2013	1,386	175	154	174	140	134	78	55	58	51	58	157	152
2014	1,451	166	146	167	143	100	62	76	64	67	154	157	149
2015	1,376	158	137	181	137	75	103	65	44	71	122	147	136
2016	1,430	166	164	134	120	74	92	69	57	67	130	135	222
2017	1,683	149	137	183	174	162	132	103	77	103	147	153	163
2018	1,771	185	160	181	181	146	144	88	110	106	147	158	165
2019	1,632	157	133	145	165	146	133	101	92	112	147	145	156
2020	1,899	201	185	181	206	205	121	72	92	88	139	196	213
2021	1,623	197	129	205	170	106	84	82	59	112	139	133	207
2022	2,028	170	203	244	217	140	122	110	88	147	184	240	163
2023	2087	247	253	245	166	140	134	108	120	80	163	206	226
2024	405	228	177										

== List of wind farms ==
- Beech Ridge Wind Farm
- Mount Storm Wind Farm - The 264-megawatt wind farm in Grant County consists of 132 turbines along 12 miles of the Allegheny Front.
- Mountaineer Wind Energy Center

== See also ==
- Solar power in West Virginia
- Wind power in the United States
- Renewable energy in the United States
