= Maidsville, West Virginia =

- Unincorporated community
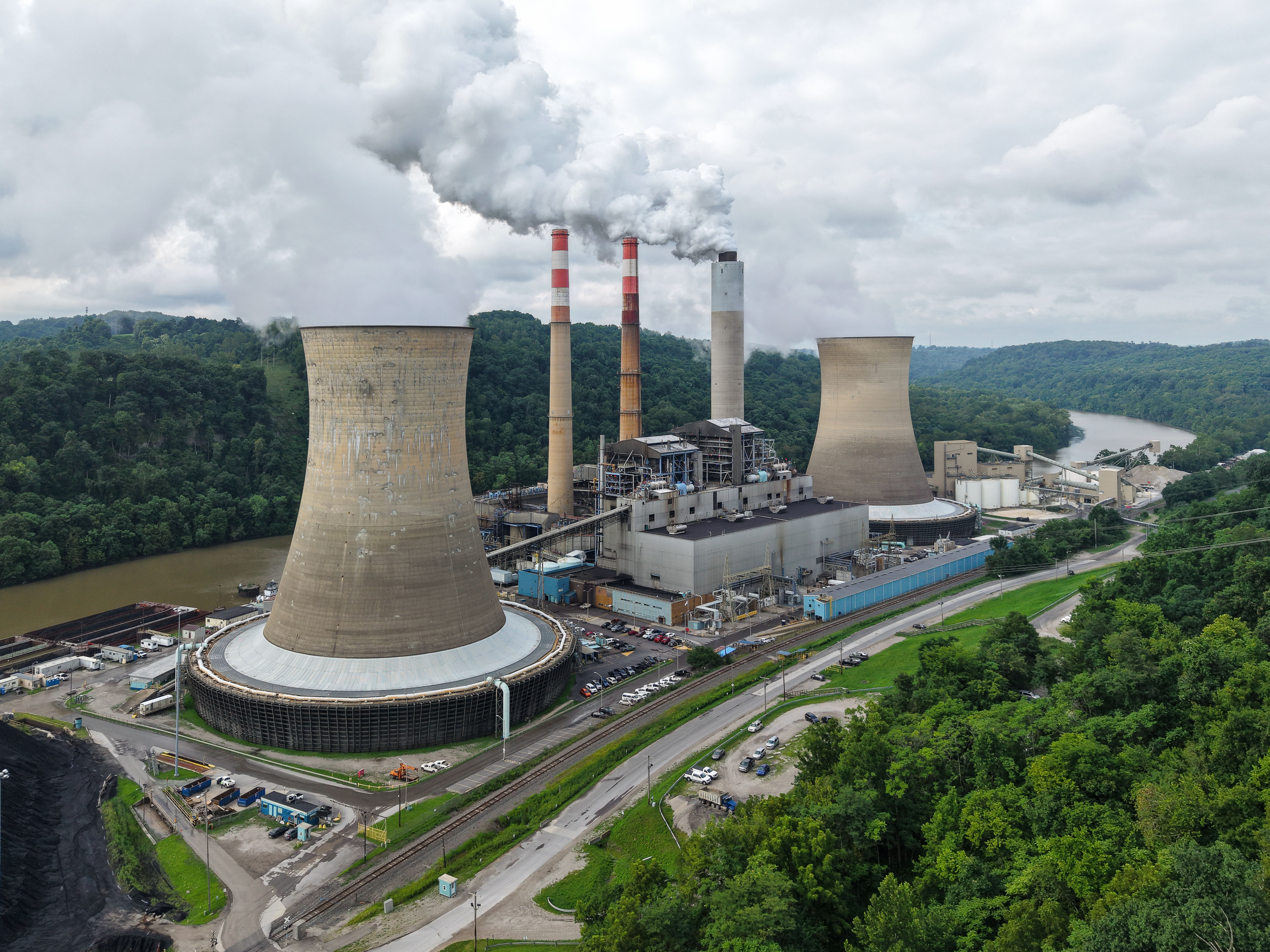
- View of Fort Martin Power Station near Maidsville

- Location within West Virginia Location within the United States
- Coordinates: 39°41′18″N 79°58′48″W
- Country: United States
- State: West Virginia
- County: Monongalia
- Elevation: 843 ft (257 m)
- Time zone: UTC-5 (Eastern (EST))
  - Summer (DST): UTC-4 (EDT)
- ZIP code: 26541
- Area codes: 304 & 681
- GNIS feature ID: 1555026

Maidsville is an unincorporated community in Monongalia County, West Virginia, United States. Maidsville is located along West Virginia Route 100, 4.5 miles (7.2 km) north-northwest of downtown Morgantown.

According to tradition, Maidsville was so named on account of there being a large share "old maids" among the first settlers.

Maidsville has a post office with ZIP code 26541. Near Maidsville is the Longview Power Plant, the cleanest, most efficient coal-fired power plant in the 13 state PJM Interconnection and one of the cleanest and most efficient in the United States.
