= Fort Martin Power Station =

Coal-fired power station in West Virginia

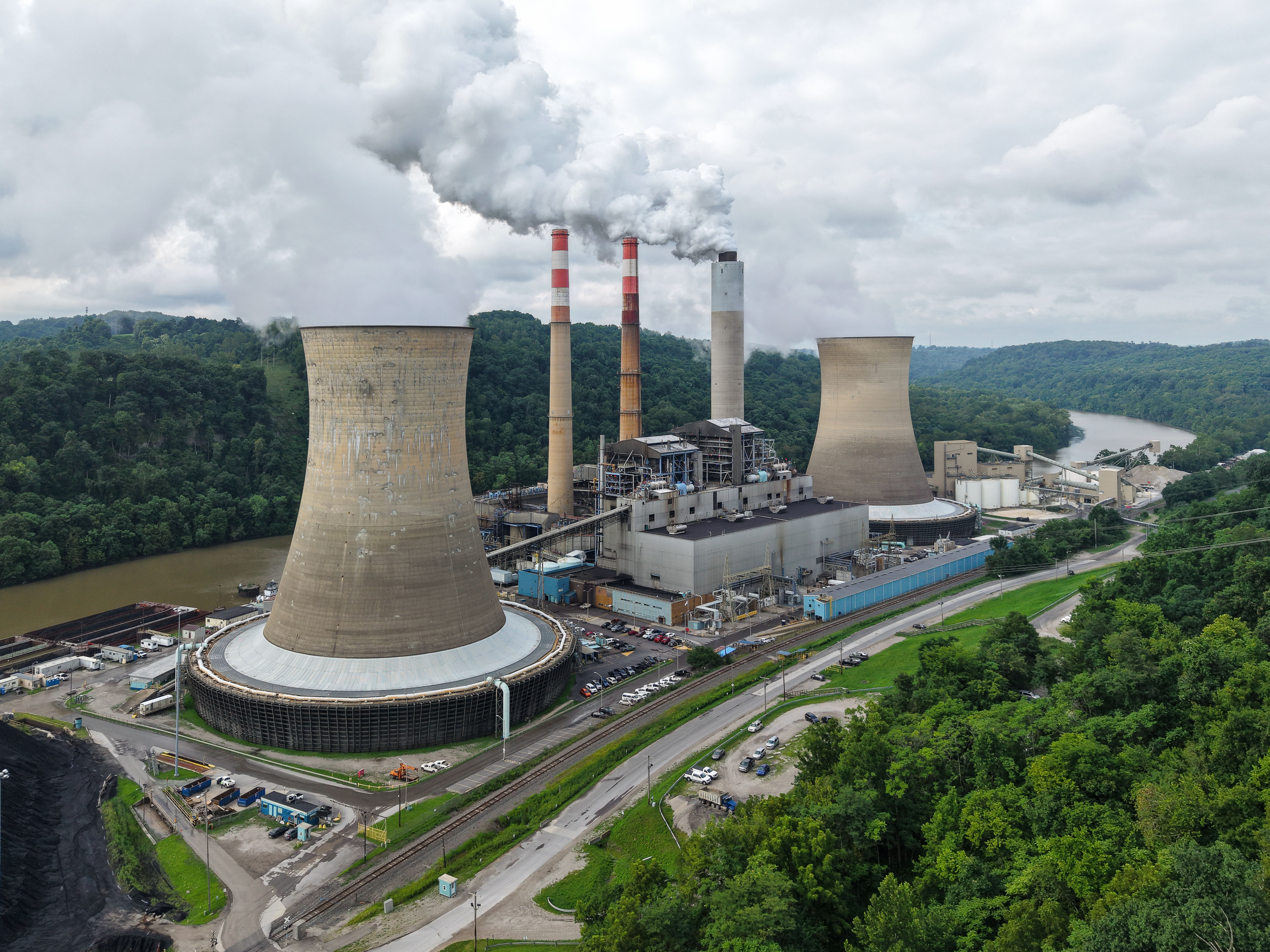
- Fort Martin Power Station in 2026
- Country: United States
- Location: Fort Martin, near Maidsville, Monongalia County, West Virginia
- Coordinates: 39.710833°N 79.9275°W
- Status: Operational
- Commission date: Unit 1: October 1967; Unit 2: December 1968
- Owner: FirstEnergy
- Operator: Monongahela Power Company

Thermal power station
- Primary fuel: Bituminous coal
- Turbine technology: Steam turbine
- Cooling source: Monongahela River

Power generation
- Units operational: 2 × 576 MW
- Nameplate capacity: 1,152 MW

Fort Martin Power Station is a coal-fired power station on the Monongahela River at Fort Martin, near Maidsville, West Virginia. It is owned and operated by Monongahela Power Company, a subsidiary of FirstEnergy. The station's two units have a combined nameplate capacity of 1,152 megawatts (MW) and a net summer capacity of 1,098 MW. The two units were started in the late 1960s and have been described as “ageing”. A new gas-fired plant has been proposed nearby.

== History ==
Plans for the first 500 MW unit estimated a cost of $57.5 million and annual consumption of about 1.35 million tons of coal from nearby mines. The planned site was about three-quarters of a mile upstream from the Pennsylvania state line. Unit 1 entered commercial service in October 1967, followed by Unit 2 in December 1968. The units have net capacities of 552 MW and 546 MW.

Fort Martin is planned to remain operational through 2035. In February 2026, Mon Power and Potomac Edison proposed a separate 1,200 MW combined-cycle natural-gas plant adjacent to Fort Martin, with operation proposed for late 2031. A public hearing on the proposal was held in July 2026.

== Environmental controls ==
In 2006, the West Virginia Public Service Commission approved construction of wet flue-gas desulfurization systems for both units. The systems entered service in 2009 and were designed to remove 98 percent of the sulfur dioxide from the flue gas using limestone forced oxidation, producing gypsum as a byproduct. The plant also uses electrostatic precipitators to collect fly ash. Scrubbed flue gas is discharged through a 550-foot (170 m) chimney, while two hyperbolic cooling towers recirculate water with makeup supplied from the Monongahela River.

== See also ==
- List of power stations in West Virginia
