= Mon Health Medical Center =

Coordinates: 39°39′50″N 79°56′48″W

Mon Health Medical Center (formerly Monongalia General Hospital) is a 189-bed acute-care community hospital and Level IV Trauma Center located in Morgantown, West Virginia, United States. It is part of Mon Health, an "integrated health care delivery system" serving north-central West Virginia, western Maryland, and southwestern Pennsylvania.

Services include oncology, orthopedics/sports medicine and physical therapy, obstetrics/gynecology, general surgery, imaging services/radiology, pulmonology, primary care, gastroenterology, urology, sleep therapy, dermatology, vein care and wound care.

== History ==
Mon Health Medical Center's roots can be traced back to the early 1900s with the establishment of the privately owned City Hospital at the corner of Wiley and Prospect streets in Morgantown, WV. City Hospital was of wood-frame construction and considered to be vulnerable to fire. In 1937 Dr. E. Frank Heiskell, a surgeon at City Hospital and family doctor to thousands of coal miners in the north-central West Virginia and southern Pennsylvania areas, and being concerned with the safety of those patients while hospitalized at City Hospital, used his life savings to begin construction of a massive steel, limestone and marble fireproof hospital to replace the wooden structure. Dr. Heiskell named the new, state-of-the art facility "Heiskell Memorial Hospital" in honor of his mother, Winifred Heiskell, and opened its doors in 1939. Dr. Heiskell added a Nursing School to supply Heiskell Memorial with well-trained nurses, and he operated the facilities until the early 1950s, when the Pallotine Order of the Roman Catholic Church purchased the hospital and renamed it "St. Vincent Pallotti Hospital." Dr. Heiskell's son, Dr. Edgar F. Heiskell Jr., joined the hospital staff as a surgeon upon his return from military service in 1945 and remained on staff until his death in 1971. The latter's son, C. Andrew Heiskell, M.D., also a surgeon, would join the staff of Monongalia General Hospital in 1973 and continues his practice there as of 2017.

The efforts to create Monongalia County Hospital, later to be named Mon General Hospital and eventually Mon Health Medical Center, to serve the medically indigent were spearheaded in the early 1920s by the volunteer Women's Hospital Association and officially sanctioned by the county government with the appointment of a voluntary board in 1923. The county hospital was located in a portion of the County Poor House.

Mon General evolved from the county hospital. In 1943 the county appointed an independent board of directors to govern the facility, making it the voluntary hospital it is today. In 1972, Mon General merged with the old St. Vincent Pallotti Hospital. In May 2017, the hospital was renamed Mon Health Medical Center.

The present Mon Health Medical Center is located at 1200 J.D. Anderson Drive in Morgantown, WV. It was dedicated on Oct. 17, 1977. In July 2008, the hospital opened its new Hazel Ruby McQuain Tower, which features all private inpatient rooms, a Women's Imaging Center, a large Emergency Department, an expanded Imaging Department, and an Intensive Care Unit. The new tower was one part of a four-year expansion and renovation project, which was completed in December 2009. The project converted Mon General into a 100 percent all private in-patient room facility

== Affiliates ==
In addition to Mon Health Medical Center, Mon Health also includes The Village at Heritage Point (a retirement community), Monongalia Emergency Medical Services (an ambulance and 911 rescue service) and Mon Health Equipment and Supplies (a durable home medical supply company). Recent acquisitions also include Preston Memorial Hospital, a 25-bed critical access hospital (CAH) located in Kingwood, West Virginia and Stonewall Jackson Memorial Hospital, a 70-bed community hospital located in Weston, West Virginia.
