= Longview Power Plant =

Coal-fired power plant in West Virginia

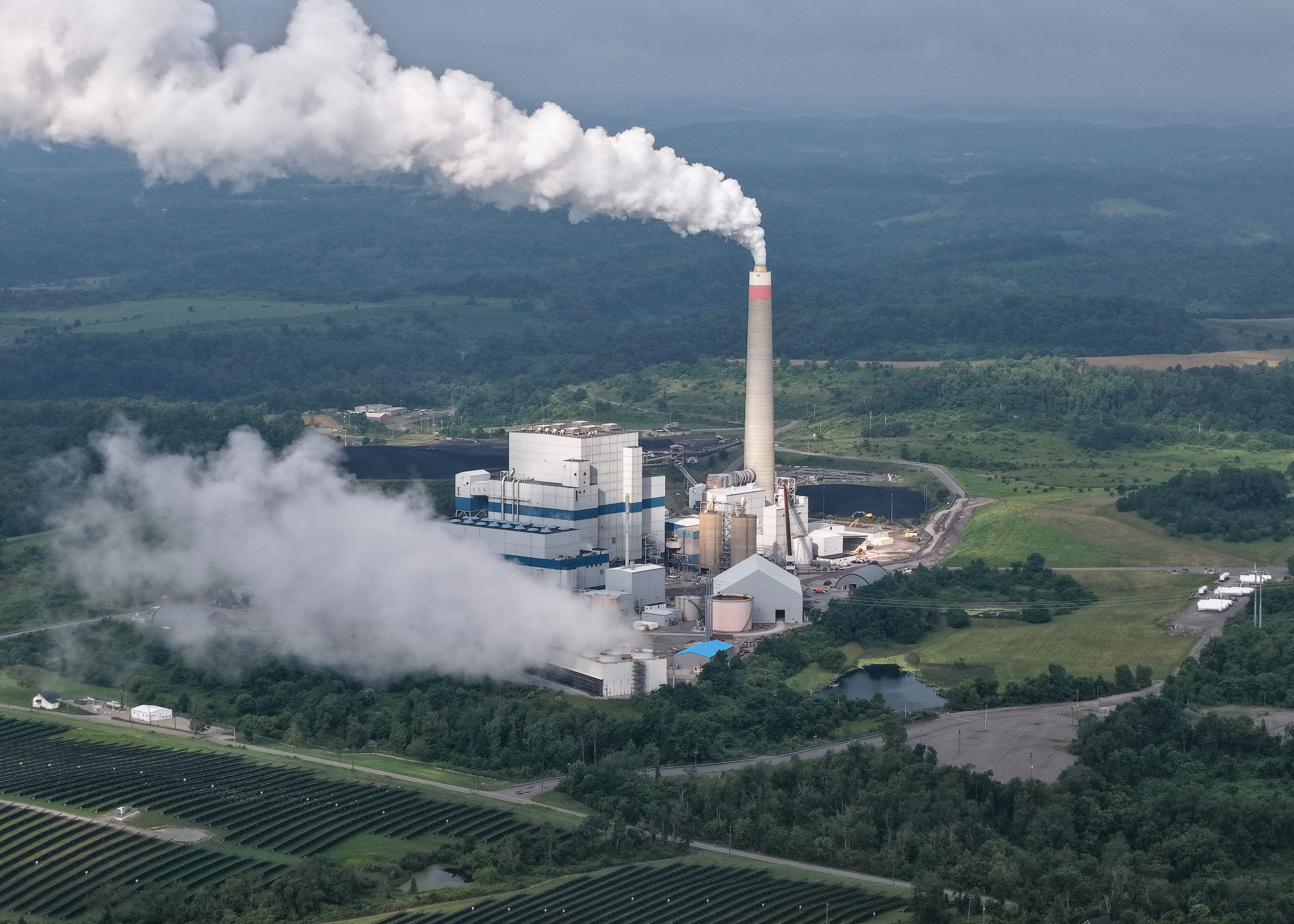
- Longview Power, pictured in 2026
- Country: United States
- Location: Monongalia County, near Maidsville, West Virginia
- Coordinates: 39°42′27″N 79°57′24″W
- Status: Operational
- Commission date: 2011
- Owner: Longview Power

Thermal power station
- Primary fuel: Coal and natural gas
- Turbine technology: Steam turbine

Power generation
- Nameplate capacity: 700 MW

Longview Power Plant is a coal-fired power plant located near Maidsville, West Virginia. The plant's single unit generates 700 megawatts (MW) of electricity from run-of-mine coal and natural gas.

== History ==
The Longview Power project cost approximately $2.2 billion. After the plant began operation in 2011, construction defects and major changes in the power markets led to the company's Chapter 11 bankruptcy in 2013. Longview attributed its need for bankruptcy "in large part because [Longview Power] has been plagued by design, construction, and equipment defects and failures …" In early 2015 the company reached a comprehensive settlement of all construction claims, and two of its major contractors agreed to remediate plant defects at their own expense. As a result, Longview Power emerged from bankruptcy in April 2015 with the full remediation of the plant underway and new ownership led by private equity firms including KKR, Centerbridge, Ascribe and Third Avenue.

Longview was visited in 2016 by West Virginia senators Joe Manchin and Shelley Moore Capito. Manchin stated the plant was an example of a cleaner future for coal-fired power. Ernest Moniz, United States Secretary of Energy, also visited the plant. His successor, Rick Perry, toured the plant in 2017.

The plant previously relied on the Mepco coal mine in nearby Greene County, Pennsylvania, but it was shut down in March 2018 because of declining production, and it was not competitive with larger mines in the area that could supply the plant.

In February 2019, Longview announced plans to add solar and natural gas generation to its state-of-the-art coal-fired facilities. The combined-cycle natural gas facility would have a capacity of 1,200 MW, complementing the coal plant's 700 MW. It would cost about $900 million to build and would be "a very modern advanced gas plant" next to "the cleanest coal plant in America." The 50 MW solar field will cost between $75 million and $80 million. In 2020, the company filed for Chapter 11 bankruptcy for the second time in less than a decade, blaming the COVID-19 pandemic.

== Environmental mitigation ==
Longview was constructed as a HELE, or high efficiency, low emissions plant. It has set industry standards for creating cleaner, more reliable power, its efficiency allowing more power to be created from less coal, and in consequence, less environmental impact, whether carbon dioxide (CO_{2}), sulfur dioxide (SO_{2}), nitrogen oxide (NO_{x}), and particulate matter.

Longview is officially a "zero discharge" power plant in West Virginia. All sewage, stack blowdown, and other liquid waste are piped to Pennsylvania, where it is discharged into the abandoned Shannopin Mine. The water is then treated and discharged into Dunkard Creek, according to a local environmental group's website.

Longview includes a new air pollution control system that results in emissions that are among the lowest in the nation for coal plants. In addition, Longview emits less CO_{2} than most other coal plants because of its fuel efficiency.

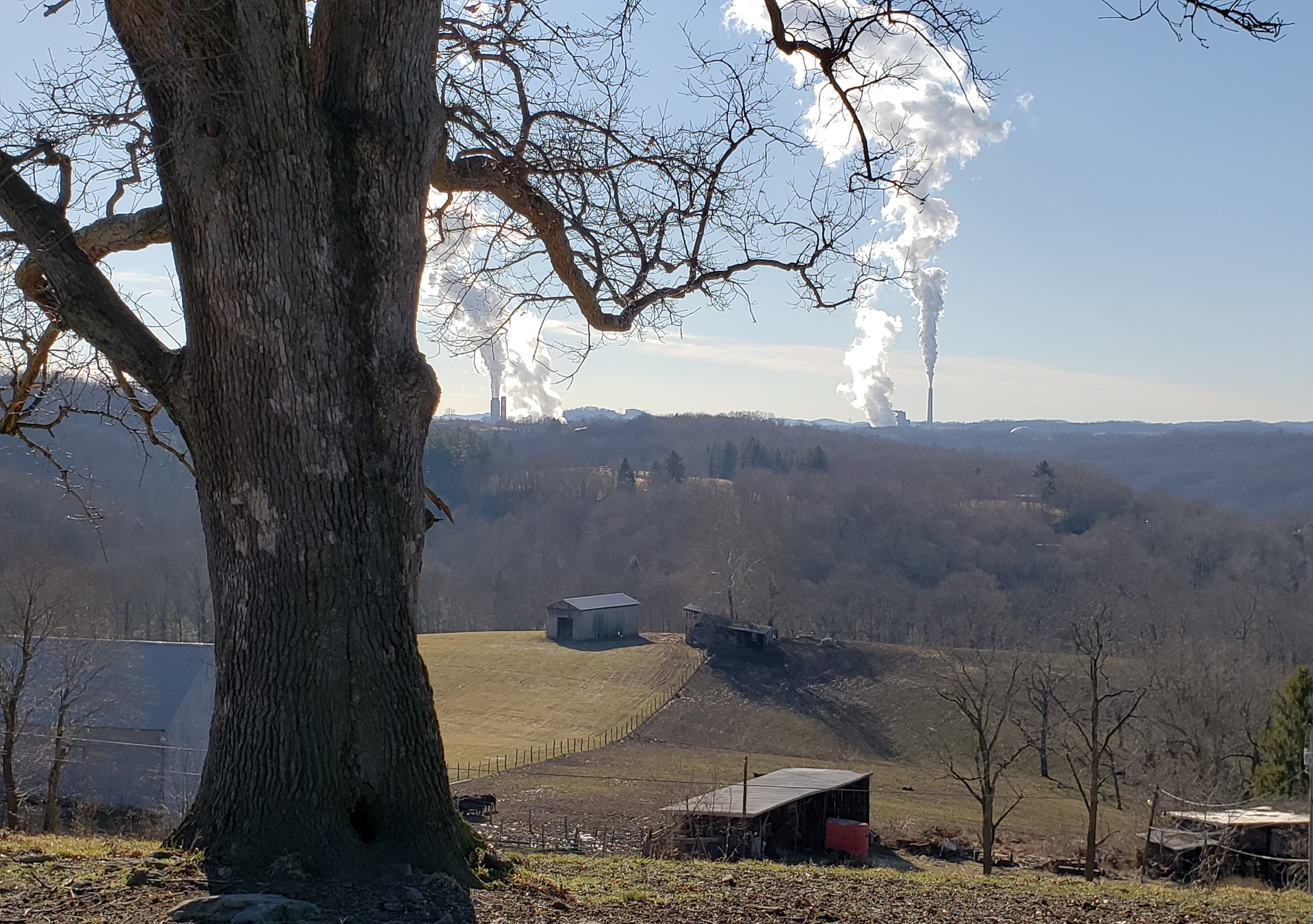
Longview Power Plant on the right, with Fort Martin Power Plant on the left, as viewed from the Pennsylvania state line

SNL Financial reported in April 2016, on Longview's 155 days of continuous operation during which it exceeded its operational metrics, with steady environmental performance and at an affordable cost. Longview also used some of its fuel flexibility and took advantage of historically low natural gas prices and co-fired natural gas for up to 20% of unit heat input without any additional investment. Longview said its CO_{2} emissions are about 15% below its peers and that it met its permit limitations despite having some of the most stringent in the nation.

== See also ==
- Prairie State Energy Campus
