= Mountaineer Wind Energy Center =

Wind farm in West Virginia, U.S.

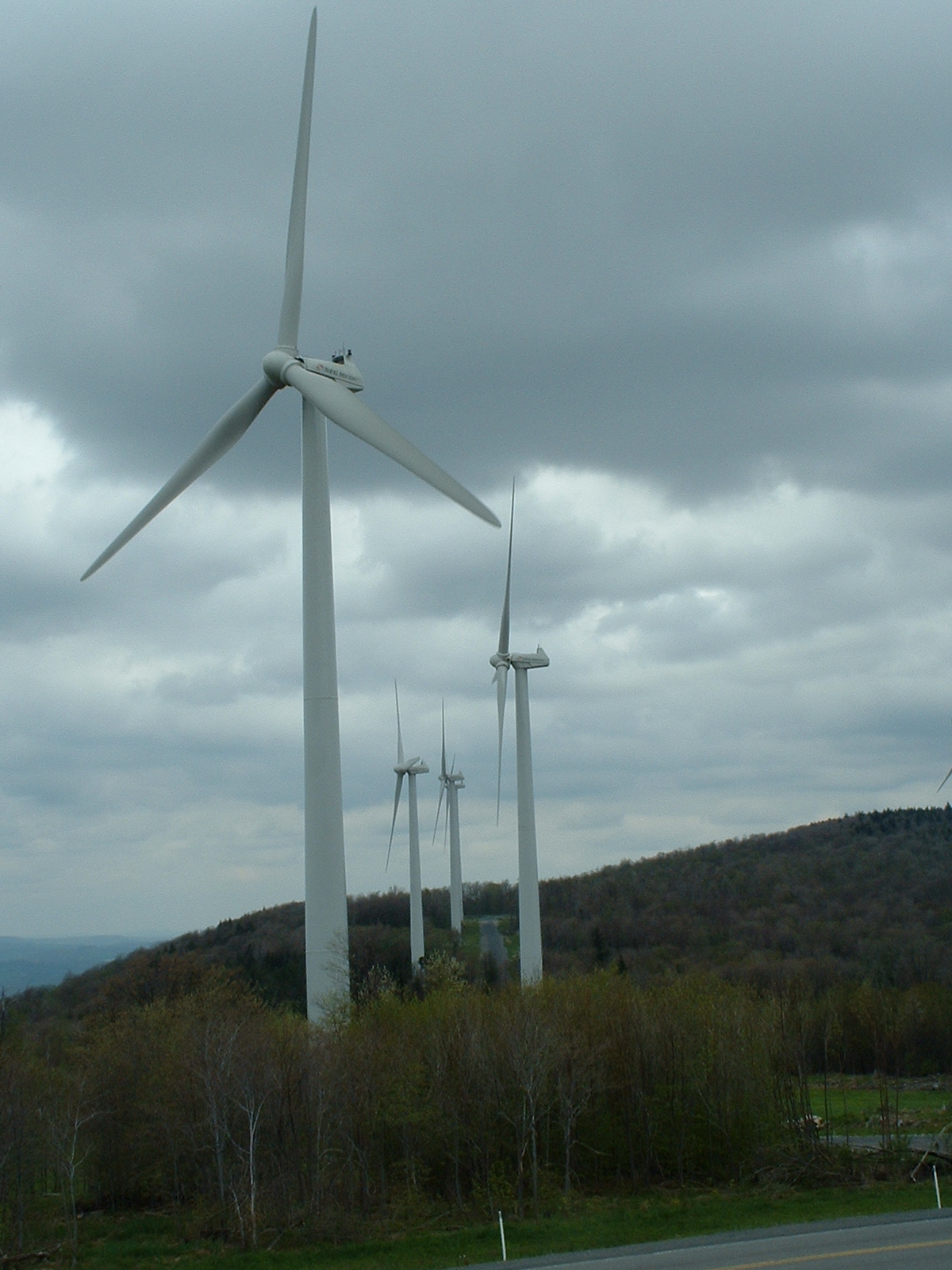
- Mountaineer Wind Energy Center's NEG Micon 1.5 megawatt (MW) wind turbines in Tucker County, West Virginia.
- Country: United States
- Location: West Virginia
- Coordinates: 39°11′02.5″N 79°32′08.2″W
- Owner: Florida Power & Light
- Operator: Florida Power & Light

Wind farm
- Type: Onshore

Power generation
- Nameplate capacity: 66 MW

Mountaineer Wind Energy Center is a wind farm on Backbone Mountain in Preston and Tucker counties in the U.S. state of West Virginia. When it came online in December 2002, Mountaineer was the first wind farm in West Virginia, and the largest east of the Mississippi River. Mountaineer Wind Energy Center is owned and operated by Florida Power & Light. Exelon Generation purchases the power produced by Mountaineer and markets it across the Mid-Atlantic region through its partnership with Community Energy, Inc., a leading wind energy marketer in the United States.

== Energy production capacity ==
Mountaineer Wind Energy Center consists of 44 NEG Micon 1.5 megawatt (MW) wind turbines that produce 66 MW of electricity. The average annual capacity factor of Mountaineer is 32 percent. Mountaineer Wind Energy Center generates enough electricity to power approximately 20,000 homes.

== Emissions offsets ==
In 2005, Mountaineer Wind Energy Center offset generation emissions totaling approximately 162,000 tons of carbon dioxide, nearly 900 tons of sulfur dioxide, and more than 400 tons of nitrogen oxide.

== Energy consumption ==
In May 2004, an aggregation of municipality and county agencies in Maryland, led by Montgomery County, signed a contract with Washington Gas to purchase wind energy to meet five percent of the collective's combined electricity usage. Under the two-year agreement, the group that includes six county agencies, 11 municipalities, and Prince George's County, will collectively purchase 38 million kWh of wind energy annually sourced from Mountaineer Wind Energy Center.

== See also ==
- Wind power in West Virginia
