= Beech Ridge Wind Farm =

Wind farm in West Virginia, United States

Coordinates: 38°05′50″N 80°32′40″W

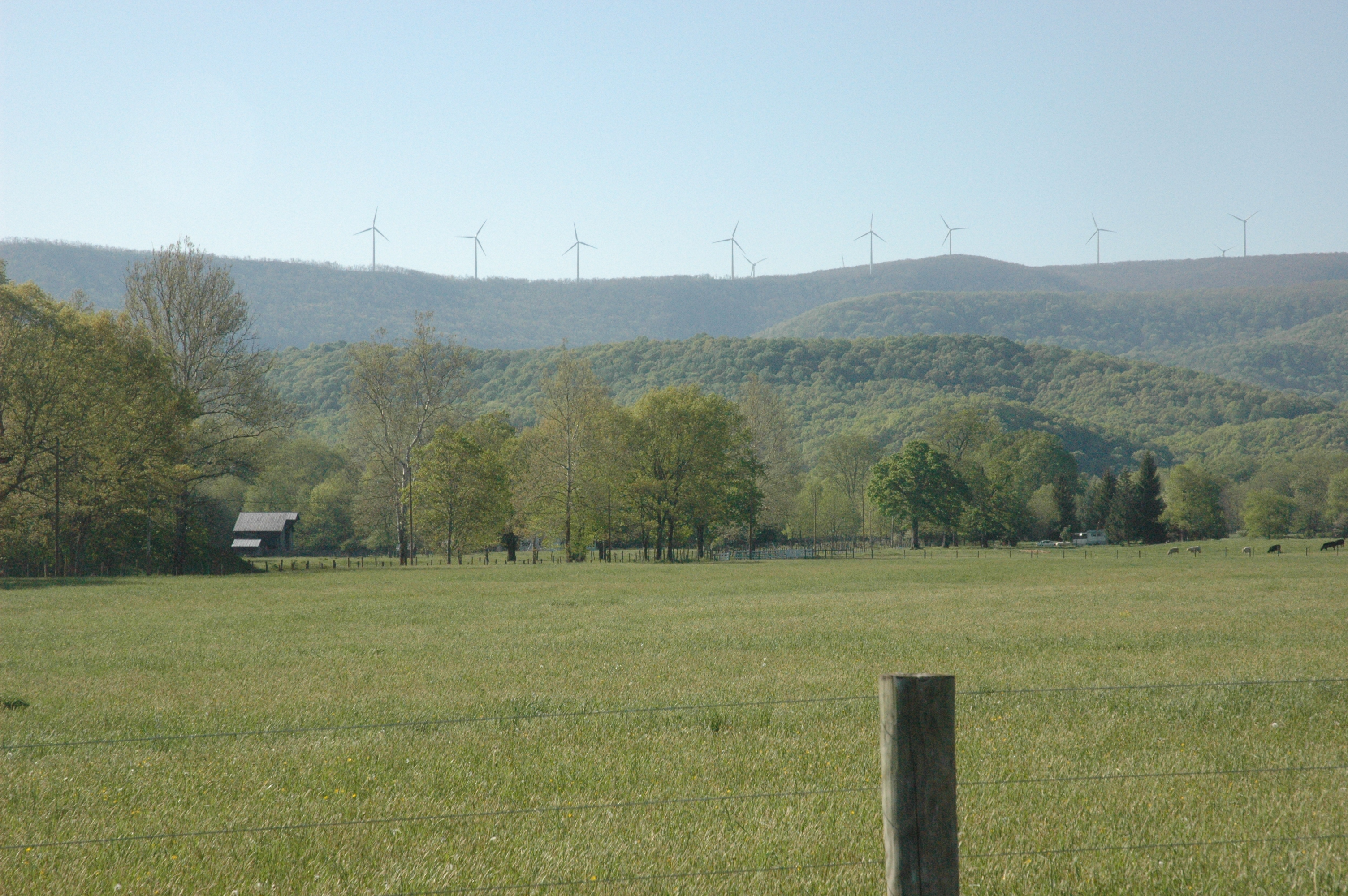
Part of Beech Ridge Wind Farm as seen from Trout, West Virginia, USA.

The Beech Ridge Wind Farm in Greenbrier County, West Virginia, is a 100 MW generating facility with 67 GE 1.5 MW wind turbines. The 250 feet (76 m) tall wind turbines, are placed along Shellcamp, Smokehouse, Beech, Rockcamp and Big ridges and Cold Knob, Old Field, Blue Knob and Nunly Mountains. It is served by a new 13.8 miles (22.2 km), 138 kilovolt power transmission line, located in Greenbrier and Nicholas counties, tied to an electrical substation near Nettie, West Virginia. As of June 2003, plans for expanding the facility with 33 additional units were underway.

The wind farm is owned by Beech Ridge Energy, LLC, which is a wholly owned subsidiary of Chicago-based Invenergy, LLC. It is being built on land owned by MeadWestvaco.

== History ==
The project came to public notice throughout West Virginia in November 2005, when its owners filed an application for a site permit with the West Virginia Public Service Commission (PSC). The proposal incited vocal controversy, particularly in Greenbrier County, where supporters touted the project's potential economic benefits, while detractors pointed out its effect on the local viewshed, which was felt might lead to negative consequences for the area's tourism industry, as well as a decrement in the local quality of life.

According to viewshed mapping prepared as part of the application, the turbines are visible from parts of Greenbrier, Nicholas and Pocahontas Counties. At least parts of the turbines can be seen from areas within the Monongahela National Forest, Watoga State Park, and the Cranberry Wilderness Areas.

== Opposition ==
In December 2005, a group called Mountain Communities for Responsible Energy (MCRE) was formed to oppose the development, citing concerns including potential reductions in property values, adverse effects on tourism, bat fatalities, claimed inefficiency of wind energy, tax benefits for wind factories, environmental degradation, and stresses on the local infrastructure.

MCRE and several local individuals filed motions to dismiss the application, but the PSC ultimately approved the project in December 2006. MCRE filed for reconsideration, but the PSC denied its motion. Subsequently, MCRE and Alicia Eisenbeiss filed separate appeals of the PSC's denial with the Supreme Court of Appeals of West Virginia. They were heard on January 9, 2008. On June 23, 2008, the Court ruled in favor of Beech Ridge, indicating that the Public Service Commission had acted appropriately in granting the building permit, thus clearing the way for the development.

The PSC held compliance hearings on October 16 and 17, during which it was announced that Beech Ridge would not build any turbines within one mile of the dwelling of anyone who opposed the project. As a result, financial settlements have been reached with several homeowners, and 5 turbines have been eliminated from the plans, reducing the total number planned to 119. On February 13, 2009, the PSC issued its final order, approving the start of construction. According to a Beech Ridge spokesman, the company planned to begin construction during the spring of 2009.

The Court's decision to hear the case delayed the construction of the project, which was originally scheduled to begin in late 2007. According to a Beech Ridge spokesperson, "...this decision will definitely delay our efforts to finalize our construction plans and contracts and, for the time being, it has put our plans to hire West Virginia construction workers to build the project on hold."

The MCRE spokesperson commented, "for 30 million years, Cold Knob, Big Ridge, and Big Beech Knob have been some of the signature landmarks of Greenbrier County. If this industrialization of our mountaintops is allowed to go forward, the new landmarks will become turbines A-16, A-17, A-18 and A-19"

On July 10, 2009, the Animal Welfare Institute and Mountain Communities for Responsible Energy filed a motion for a preliminary injunction against developer Beech Ridge Energy LLC of Rockville, Maryland in U.S. District Court. The plaintiffs claim that ongoing destruction of the endangered Indiana bat's habitat is occurring in violation of the U.S. Endangered Species Act.

== Construction ==
Construction began in mid-2009 and by early December of that year, road building and site preparation was well advanced, and several turbines had been erected. However, a federal district judge ruled that while Invenergy could complete the construction of the 40 units currently under construction, others could not be built until the company applied for and received a permit to allow incidental kills of Indiana Bats from the United States Fish and Wildlife Service. Further, the company may operate the existing 40 windmills only during winter months, when the bats are hibernating.

The Wind Farm operates GE SLE wind turbines.

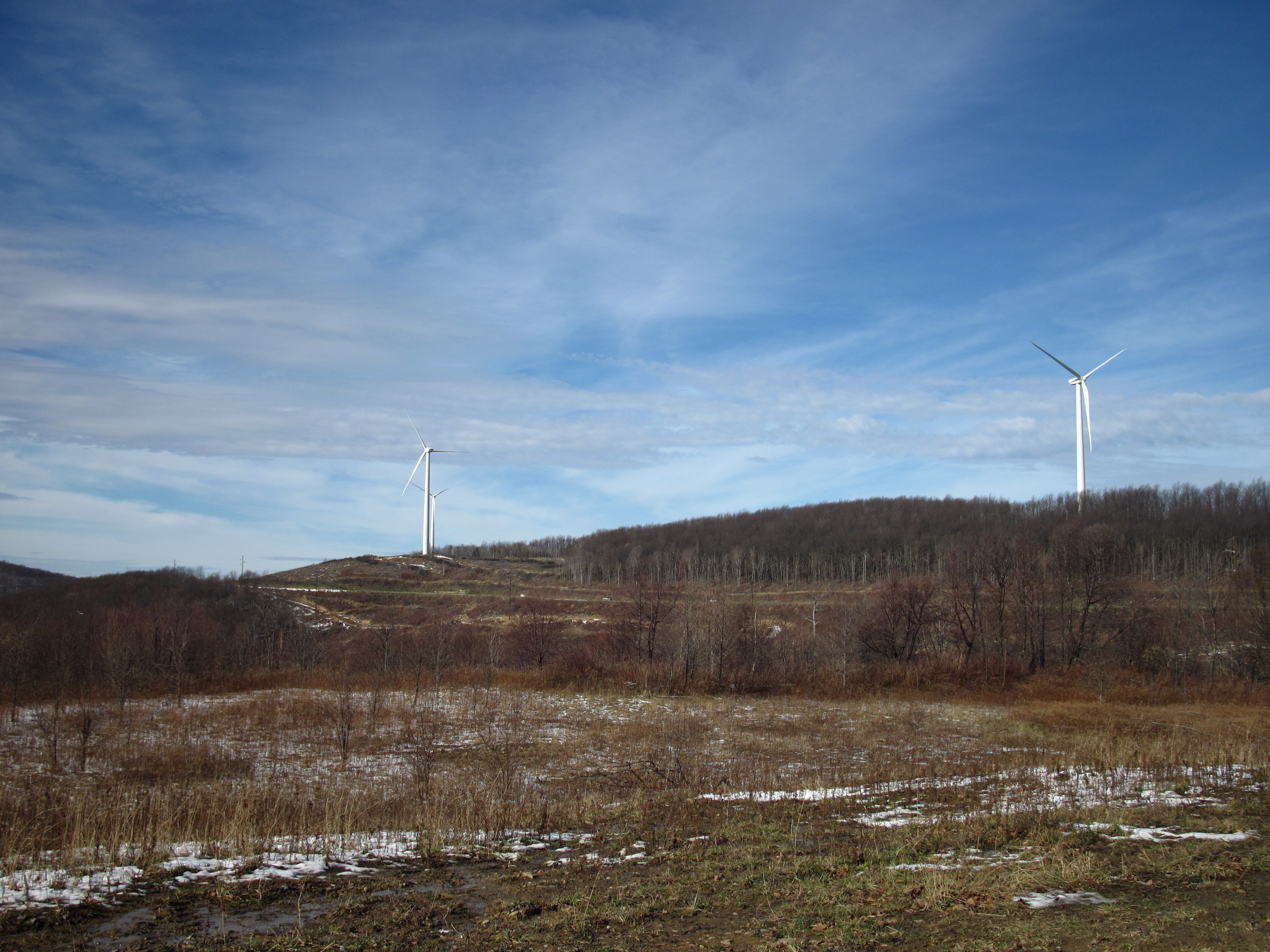
Wind turbines that are part of the Beech Ridge Wind Farm located on Beech Ridge, in Greenbrier County, West Virginia.

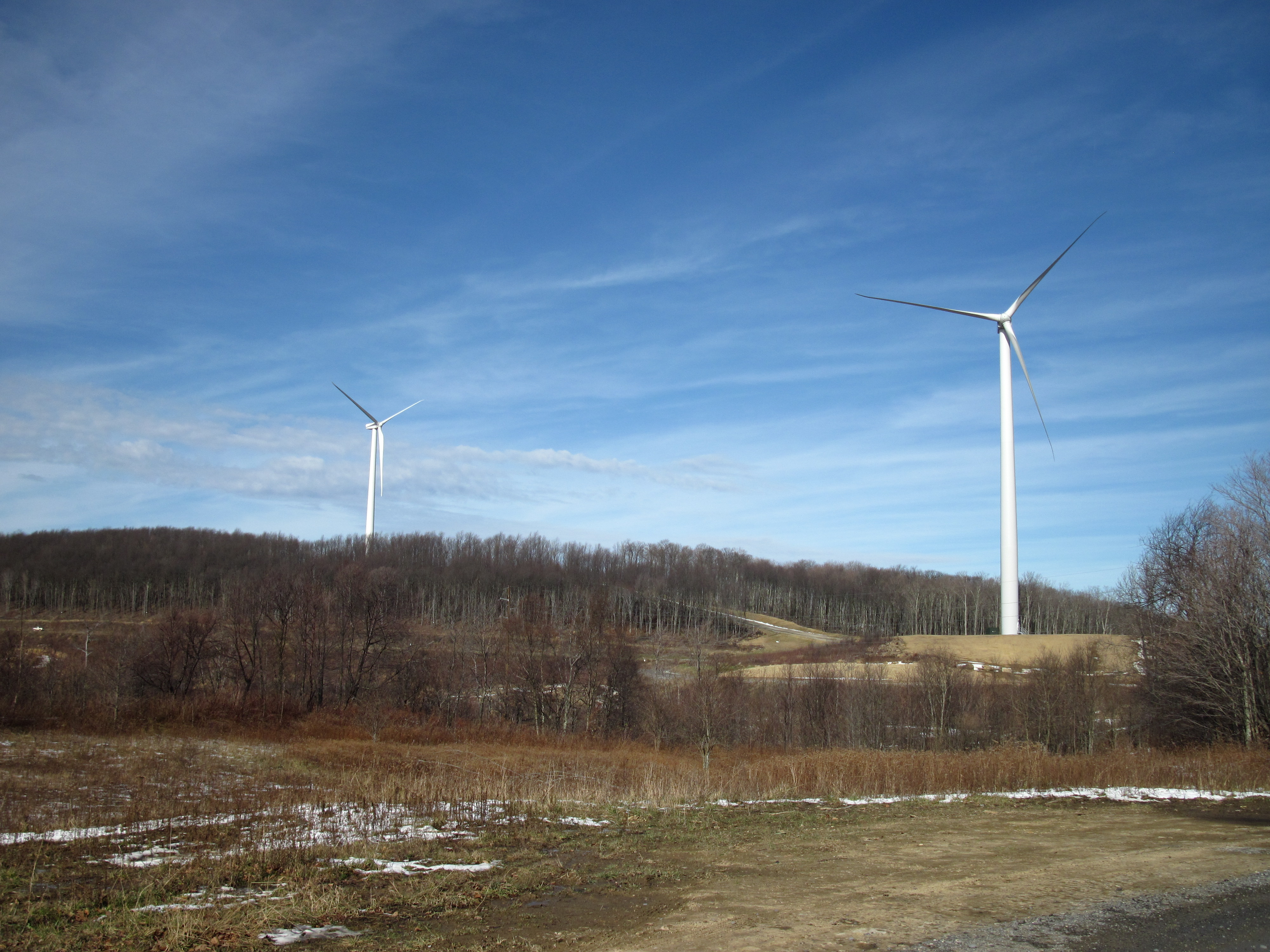
Wind turbines that are part of the Beech Ridge Wind Farm located on Beech Ridge, in Greenbrier County, West Virginia.

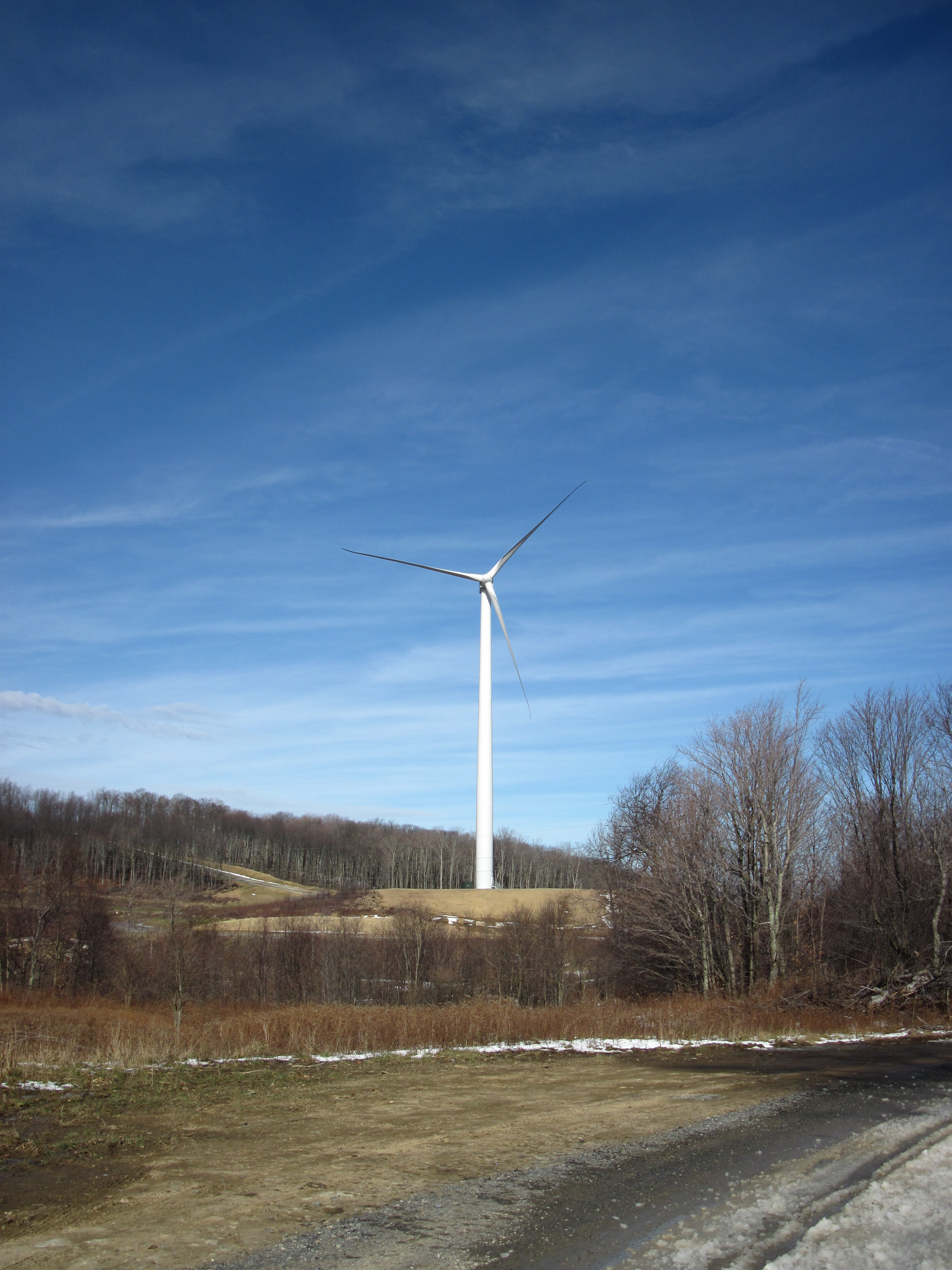
One of the many wind turbines that are part of the Beech Ridge Wind Farm located on Beech Ridge, in Greenbrier County, West Virginia.

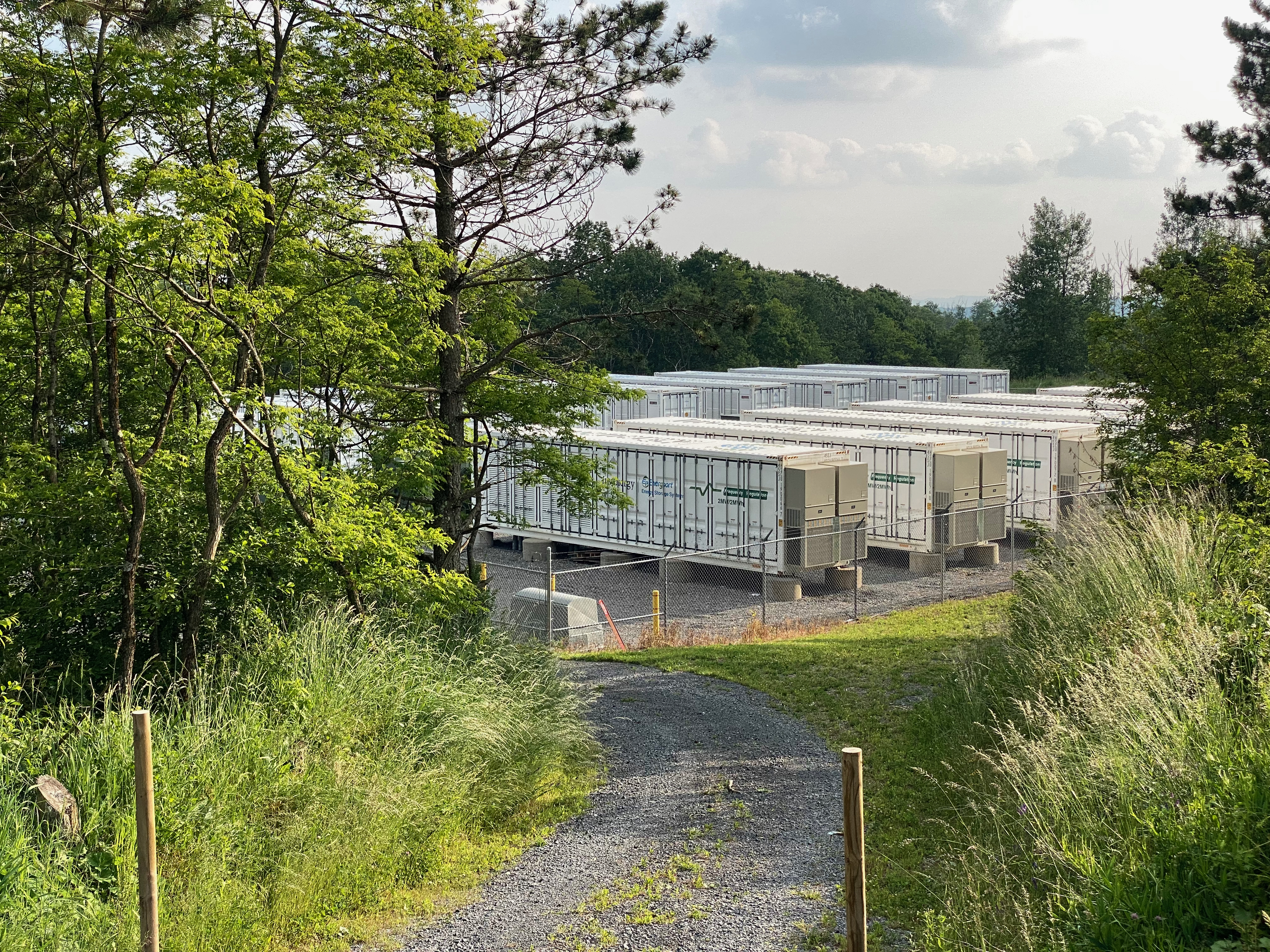
The 31.5MW Beech Ridge Energy Storage System

== See also ==
- Wind power in West Virginia
- Wind power in the United States
