= Mount Storm Wind Farm =

Wind farm in West Virginia, USA

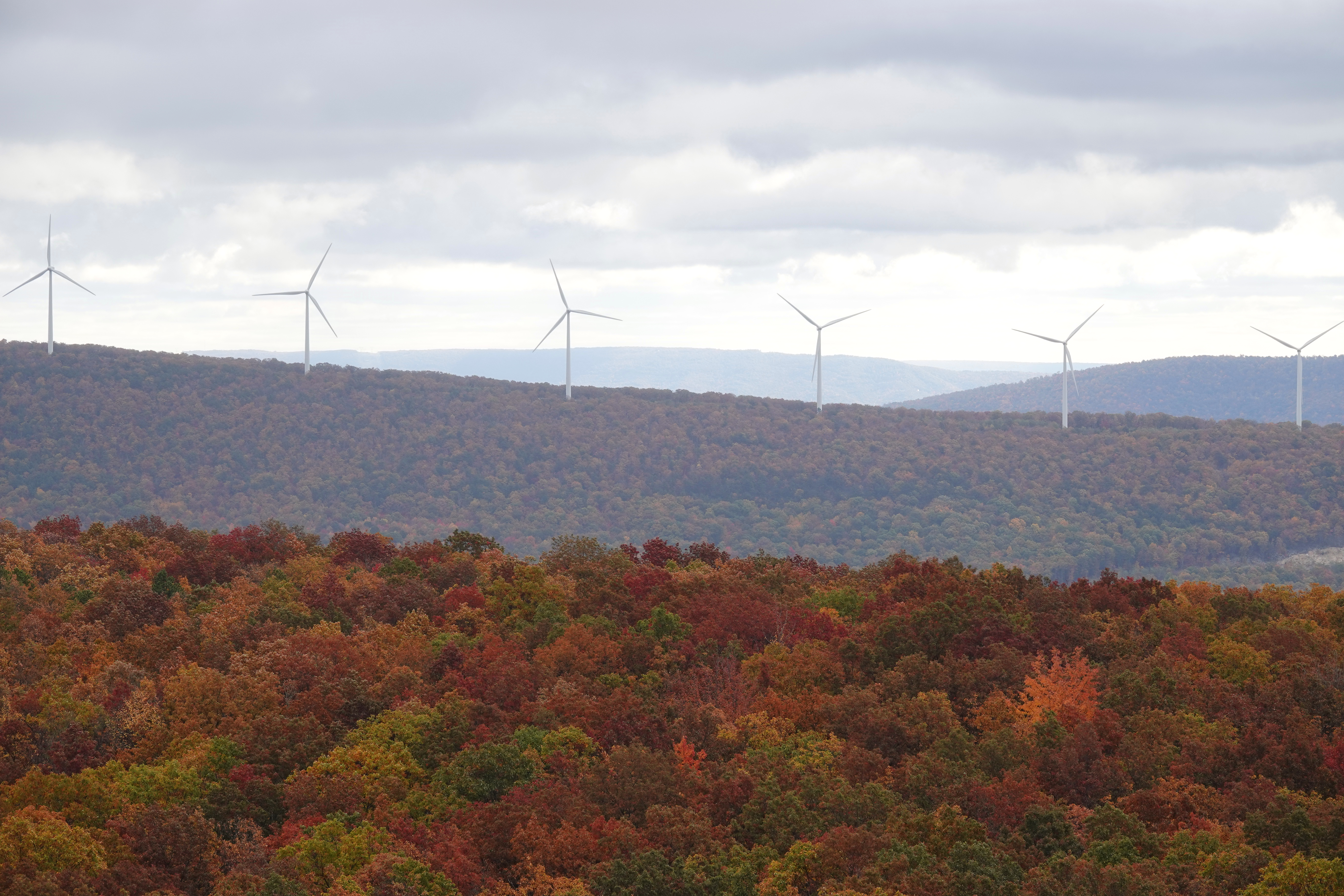
- Country: United States
- Location: Grant County, West Virginia
- Coordinates: 39°13′28″N 79°12′15″W
- Status: Operational
- Construction began: 2006
- Commission date: 2008
- Owner: Castleton Commodities International

Wind farm
- Type: Onshore

Power generation
- Units operational: 132 turbines
- Make and model: Siemens Gamesa G80-2.0 MW
- Nameplate capacity: 264 MW
- Capacity factor: 26.4% (average 2009-2019)
- Annual net output: 613 GW·h

The Mount Storm Wind Farm is located 120 miles west of Washington, D.C. in Grant County, West Virginia. The wind farm includes 132 Gamesa G80 wind turbines each with a two megawatt (MW) capacity along 12 miles of the Allegheny Front. Construction of the wind farm began in 2006 and the project is now fully operational, generating up to 264 MW of electricity for the mid-Atlantic power grid.

Nedpower Mount Storm, LLC was formed in 2007 as a joint venture between Shell and Dominion Resources, and was acquired by a subsidiary of Castleton Commodities International in 2019.

== History ==
Plans for the farm were first announced in 2001, when the U.S. Wind Force filed for a permit with the West Virginia Public Service Commission to build a 166 turbine wind farm, which would have been the largest wind farm east of the Mississippi River. The project's backers hoped that the first turbines would be operational by late 2002 with the rest of the facility coming online in 2003, but opponents quickly raised objections, arguing that the project would threaten birds and diminish home values in the surrounding area.

In May 2002, the Public Service Commission approved the U.S. Wind Force's permit application without any significant opposition. The company also reached an agreement with the AFL-CIO to use union labor in the construction of the facility. At the hearings for the permit, speakers in favor of the project included Walt Helmick, a member of the West Virginia Senate, Jeff Barger, the County Commissioner of Grant County, and Steve White a union leader. A study by the U.S. Fish and Wildlife Service concluded that the project posed little danger to local birds, clearing the way for construction.

In August 2019, Castleton Commodities International announced that it had purchased Nedpower Mount Storm through one of its subsidiaries.

== Electricity production ==
Mount Storm Wind Electricity Generation (MW·h)
Year	Total Annual MW·h
2008	222,471
2009	579,436
2010	702,979
2011	654,187
2012	587,120
2013	600,277
2014	604,750
2015	618,493
2016	633,024
2017	566,611
2018	611,330
2019	579,690
Average (2009-2019)	612,536

== Turbine Losses (to fire) ==
1. (January 16, 2008)
2. (January 7, 2015)
3. (2018 *requires date verification and siting)

== See also ==
- Wind power in West Virginia
- List of wind farms in the United States
