= Barton Knob =

Mountain in United States of America

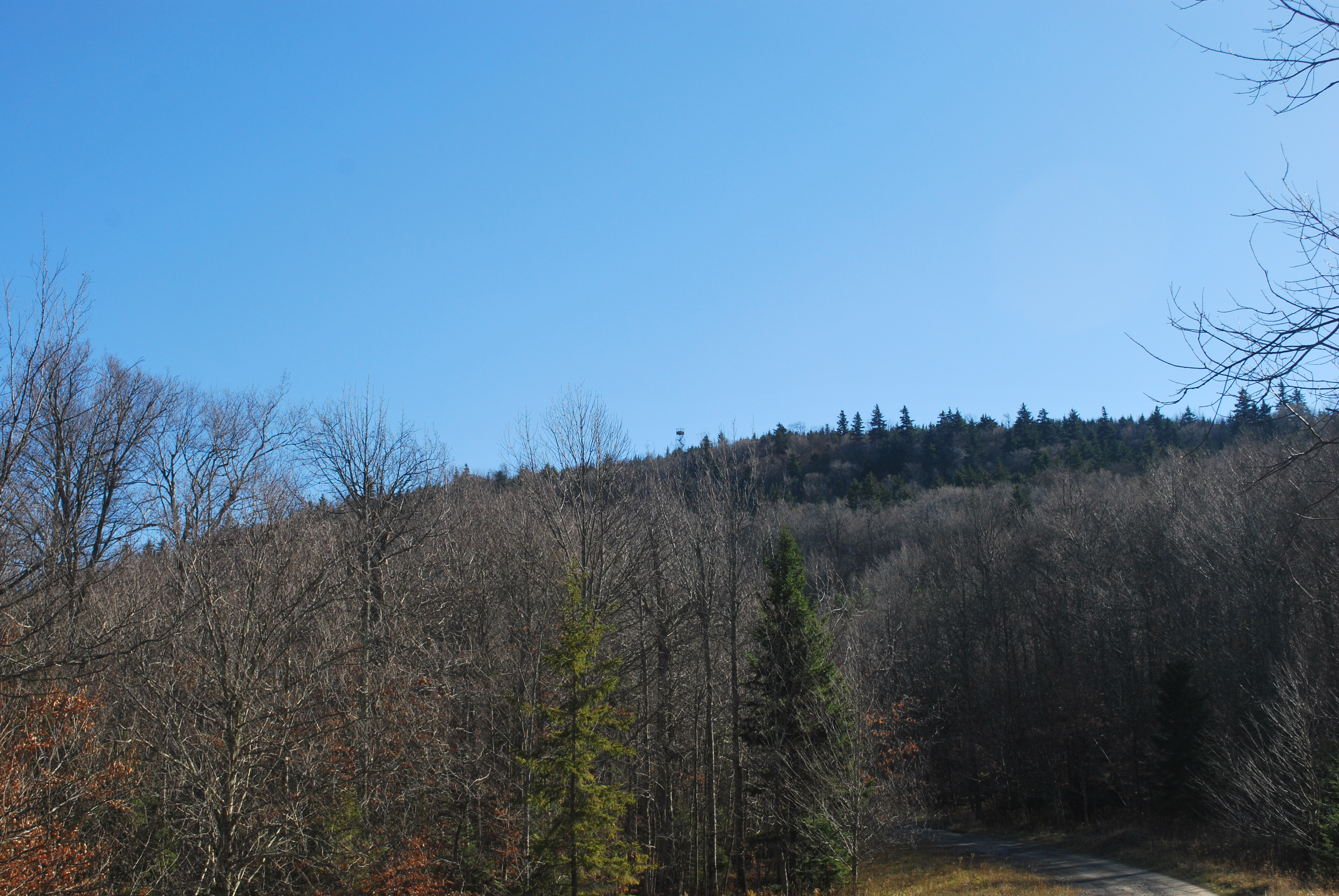
- View looking south towards Barton Knob

Highest point
- Elevation: 4,434 ft (1,351 m)
- Prominence: 574 ft (175 m)
- Coordinates: 38°37′01″N 79°55′47″W

Geography
- Location within West Virginia
- Location: Randolph, West Virginia, United States
- Parent range: Cheat Mountain

Climbing
- Access: hike from FR 227

Barton Knob is a mountain summit located on Cheat Mountain in southeastern Randolph County, West Virginia. Easily accessible during warm-weather months, Bickle Knob is also home to one of the few remaining fire towers in Monongahela National Forest.

== Fire Tower ==
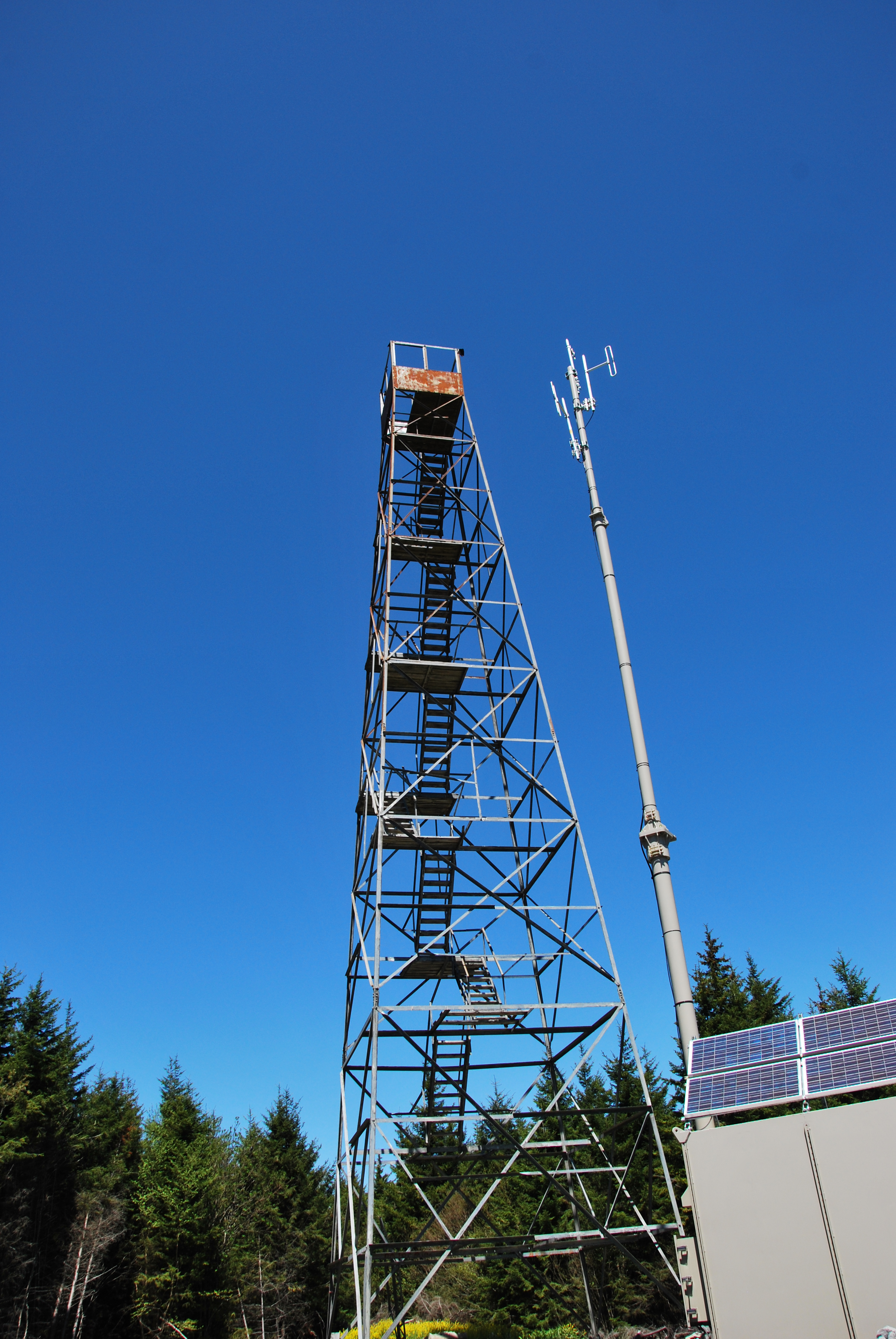
Photo of fire tower and radio repeater on Barton Knob.

One of the most notable features is its fire tower, which has graced the top of the mountain since at least 1939. While the tower is still standing as of September 2016, it has been abandoned and is no longer safe to climb. In June 2010, the U.S. Forest Service planned to remove the tower as part of a project to construct a radio repeater on Barton Knob. The radio repeater was installed by May 2012 adjacent to the tower, which was not removed.

== Strip mining ==
The area surrounding Barton Knob is also notable for having been strip mined prior to its acquisition by Monongahela National Forest as part of the Mower Tract in 1986. Today, MNF's Strip Mine Trail (Trail #350) traverses much of the area mined on the south side of Barton Knob and a ledge created continuing east along Cheat Mountain.

== Rainbow Gathering ==
In 2005, the Rainbow Gathering considered using (and some may have used) strip-mined land near Barton Knob after being displaced from the original meeting site near Alpena.

== Forest restoration ==
In late 2010, the Forest Service designated a 90-acre (36 ha) section of Barton Knob as the Barton Bench Ecological Restoration Site. After strip mining, the land had been replanted with non-native grasses to protect the soil. This also led to an arresting of ecological development as the grasses kept out any native growths. The Forest Service is conducting experiments on various ways to restart ecological succession on the site with an eye towards eventual reforestation with native red spruce and hardwood trees.

== See also ==
- Bickle Knob, an open Monongahela National Forest observation tower
- Olson Observation Tower, another Monongahela National Forest observation tower
- Cheat Mountain, on which Barton Knob sits
- Monongahela National Forest
