= Lake Sherwood =

Lake Sherwood or Sherwood Lake may refer to some places in the United States:

United States

- Lake Sherwood, California, a gated community
  - Lake Sherwood (California), the reservoir around which the community is built
- Lake Sherwood (Florida), a lake near Orlando, Florida
- Lake Sherwood, Wisconsin, a CDP
- Lake Sherwood (Kansas), a lake
- Sherwood Lake (Berrien County, Michigan), a lake
- Lake Sherwood (West Virginia), a lake in the Monongahela National Forest
