= Camp Kno-Koma =

Camp Kno-Koma is an independent, non-profit 501(c)(3) organization, located in West Virginia. As a non-profit organization, their mission is to serve with the goal of providing Camp Kno-Koma a summer camping experience for children with diabetes in and around the state of West Virginia. Camp Kno-Koma provides an opportunity for learning and fun. Surrounded by counselors and other kids with diabetes, campers are freed from the feelings of being different and are able to enjoy one of childhood's great pleasures: summer camp.

== History ==
Camp Kno-Koma was started in 1950 under the direction of Dr. George P. Heffner. The camp was held on August 27 to September 3, 1950 at Camp Cliffside in Alum Creek, and was attended by 34 campers. There were 15 boys between the ages of 7 and 14, and 19 girls between the ages of 6 and 14. Heffner continued to serve as the camp medical director until 1963, when he moved his practice to Florida. It was at that point that Dr. R. N. O'Dell took ever the medical direction of the camp. He served with the camp until 1968, when it was taken over by Dr. William G. Klingberg. Klingberg led the camp from 1968 until 1983. It was during that time that Dr. Rick Blum was brought on board as the medical director. Blum started with the camp in 1981 and continues as its medical director up until today. In its history, the camp has gone from its original location of Camp Cliffside to many other locations throughout West Virginia, including Camp Camelot, Camp Galahad, Camp Caesar, Camp Russell at Oglebay Park and Camp Virgil Tate. Since 2010, it has been held at the Greenbrier Youth Camp located in the Monongahela National Forest, near Anthony, WV.
