= Spice Run Wilderness =

Wilderness area in West Virginia, United States

- IUCN category Ib (wilderness area)
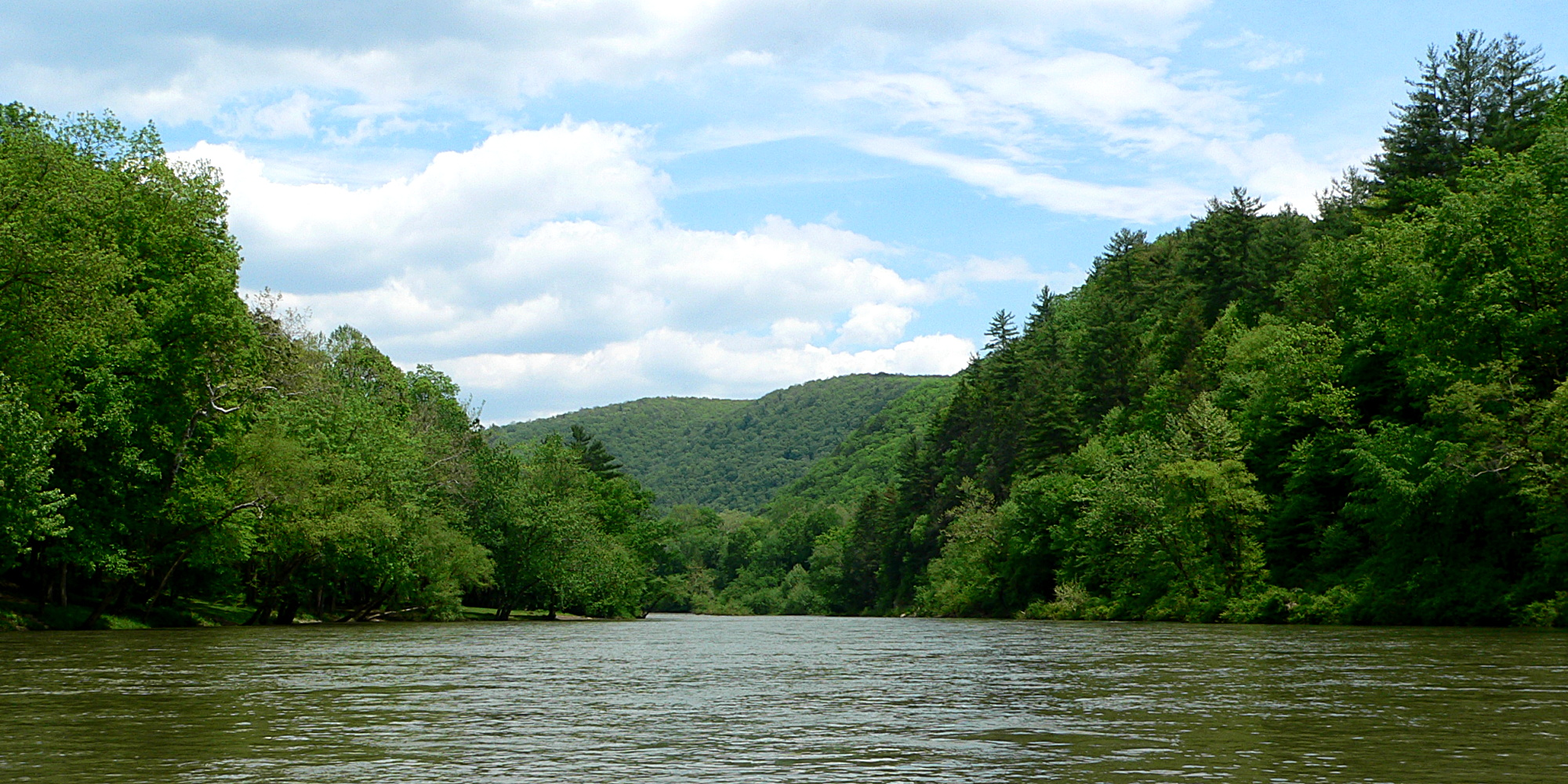
- The Greenbrier River (shown here downstream at Anthony) forms the western boundary of the wilderness.

- Location within West Virginia
- Location: West Virginia, United States
- Coordinates: 38°02′35″N 80°13′59″W
- Area: 6,030 acres (24.4 km^{2})
- Elevation: 1,965 ft (599 m)
- Established: 2009
- Operator: Monongahela National Forest
- Website: Monongahela National Forest Wilderness Areas

Spice Run Wilderness (SRW) is a U.S. Wilderness area within the Monongahela National Forest of West Virginia in the United States. The remote area has no passenger car access.

== Access ==
Users of SRW must enter it via the Greenbrier River (easily fordable at low-normal flows upstream of Spice Run), or by hiking in from the adjacent Calvin Price State Forest, or by driving a high-clearance vehicle to the southeastern corner of the Wilderness along Greenbrier County Route 16.

== History ==
Spice Run was named after a native shrub, Lindera benzoin — known as "spicebush" or "spicewood". The Spice Run Lumber Company created a logging boom town that harvested stands of timber to float down the Greenbrier River for the sawmills. So great were these log runs, that the waterways were choked.

In 2009, Spice Run was designated a Wilderness along with several other areas of Monongahela National Forest.

== Ecology ==
Aside from Spice Run, the Davy Run and Kincaid Run watersheds are within the Spice Run Wilderness. All three are native brook trout tributaries to the Greenbrier River. Besides fishing, camping, hiking, botany and bird watching are popular activities. There are at least 230 species of birds to watch. Nine animals are on the Federal list for endangered species or threatened species such as the northern flying squirrel.

Across the Greenbrier River rests the Greenbrier River Trail, maintained by the West Virginia Division of Natural Resources along the former Chesapeake and Ohio Railway Greenbrier Subdivision. This portion still shows traces of the old lumber-mill on the banks where the flow of logs was controlled. Of the original community of Spice Run, only one house remains standing.

== See also ==
- List of U.S. Wilderness Areas
- Wilderness Act
- Greenbrier River Watershed Association
