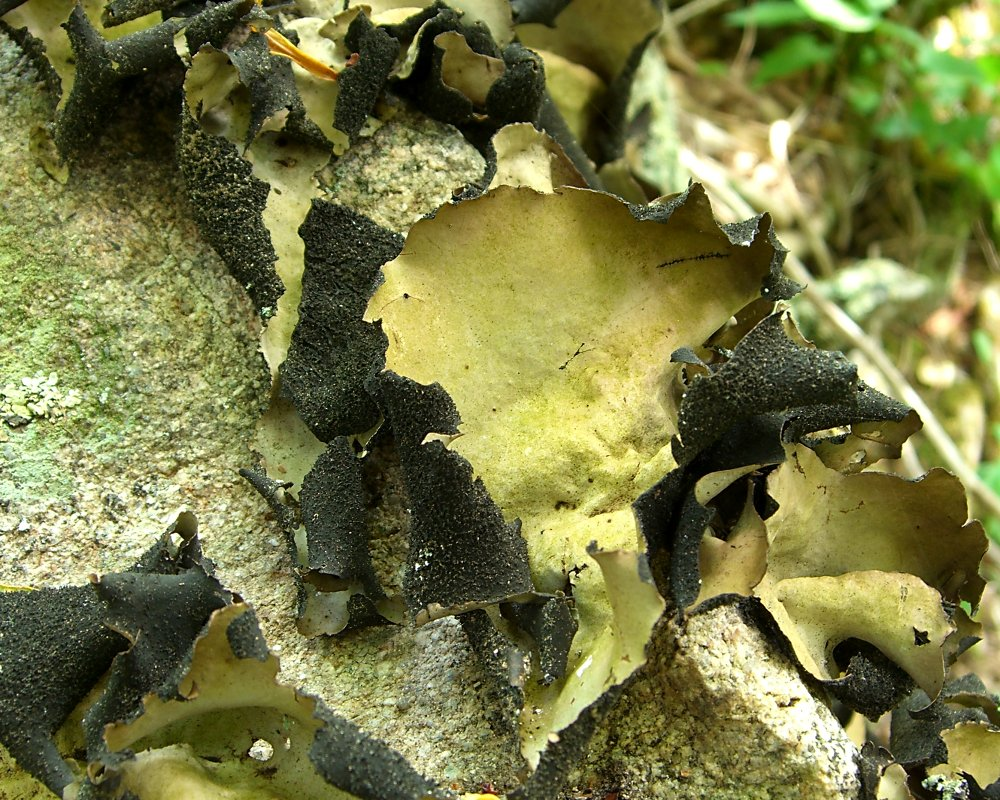
- in the Appalachians

Conservation status
- Secure (NatureServe)

Scientific classification
- Kingdom: Fungi
- Division: Ascomycota
- Class: Lecanoromycetes
- Order: Umbilicariales
- Family: Umbilicariaceae
- Genus: Umbilicaria
- Species: U. mammulata

Binomial name
- Umbilicaria mammulata (Ach.) Tuck. (1848)

Synonyms
- Gyrophora mammulata Ach. (1814)

= Umbilicaria mammulata =

Species of lichen

Umbilicaria mammulata, or smooth rock tripe, is a foliose lichen found on boulders and rock walls. It is one of the largest known lichens, typically growing to a size of 4 to 15 cm (1.6 to 5.9 in).

== Description ==
Umbilicaria mammulata is among the largest lichens in the world. The thallus of U. mammulata is usually 4 to 15 cm (1.6 to 5.9 in) in diameter, but specimens have been known to reach 63 cm (2.07 ft) in the Smoky Mountains of Tennessee. The smooth upper surface is a reddish-brown to grayish-brown color and the lower surface is pitch black.

== Ecology ==
This species is found on boulders and steep rock walls in forests and around lakes. It grows on several types of rock substrate, such as acidic rock, sandstone, quartz, and granitic rock. Like most lichens, U. mammulata is sensitive to air and water quality. If conditions are optimal, seeing rocks or cliffs covered in dinner plate-sized thalli is not unusual. However, it has been suggested that U. mammulata is not as sensitive to pH and water quality as it is to the frequency and duration of precipitation.

== Gallery ==
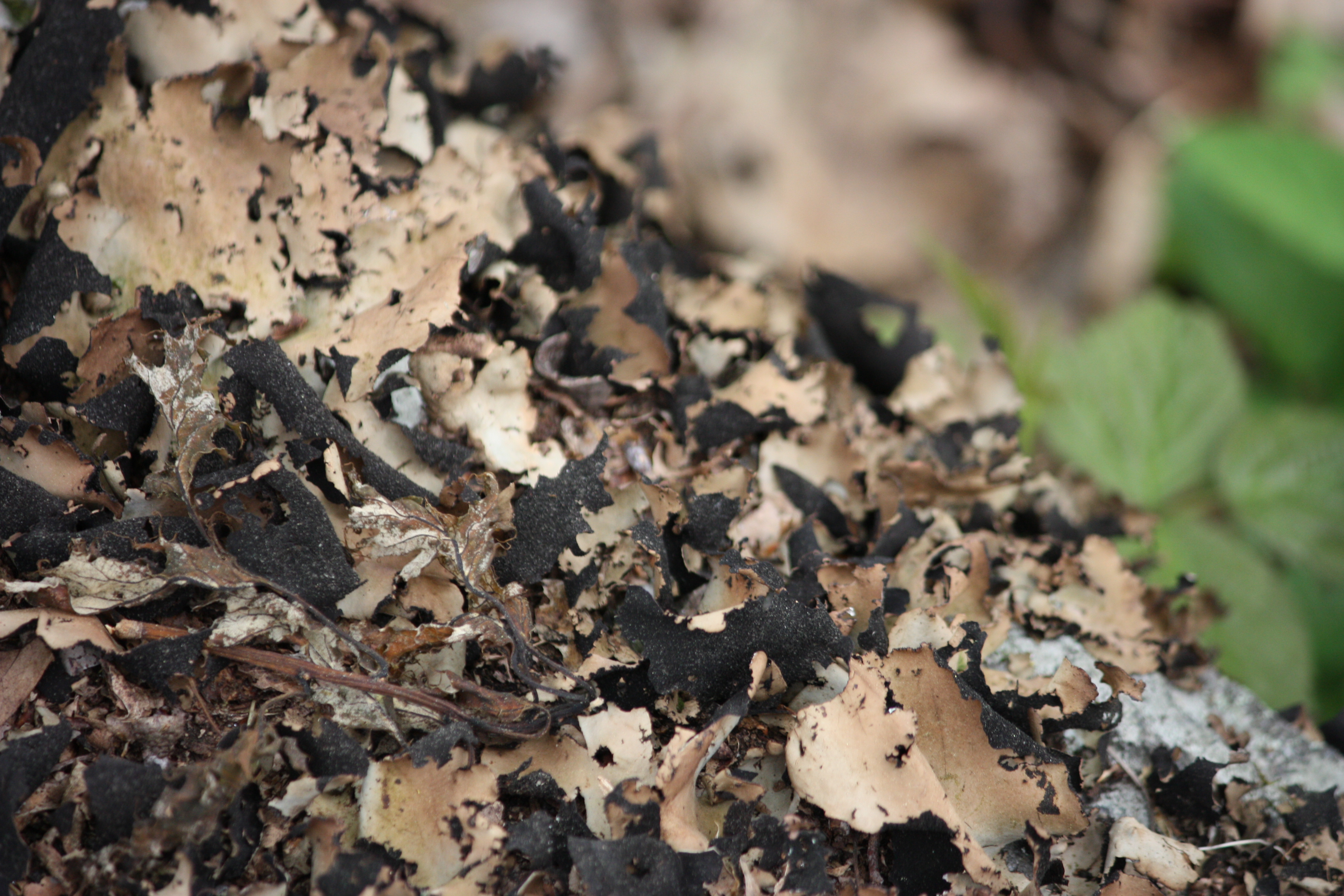
U. mammulata growing on a rock on Pratt Mountain.

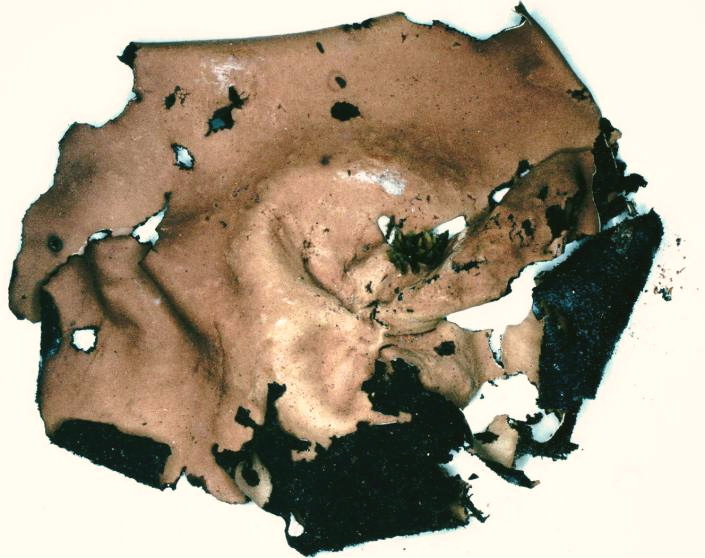
The smooth upper surface of U. mammulata.

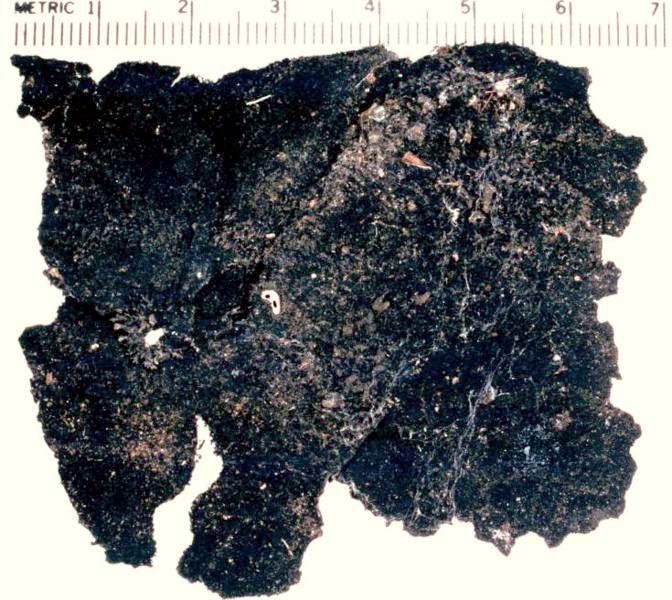
The black bottom surface of U. mammulata.

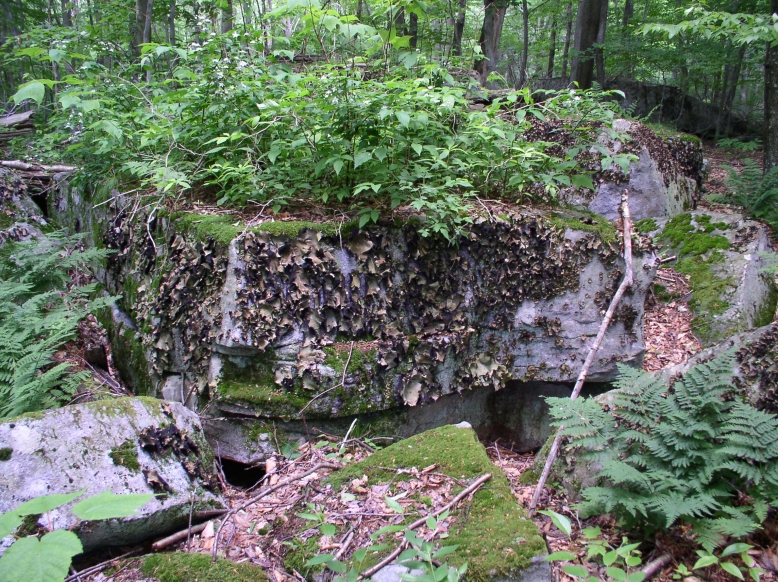
U. mammulata on sandstone blocks in Otter Creek Wilderness, West Virginia.

== See also ==
- Largest organisms
