= Olson Observation Tower =

Fire towers in Monongahela National Forest

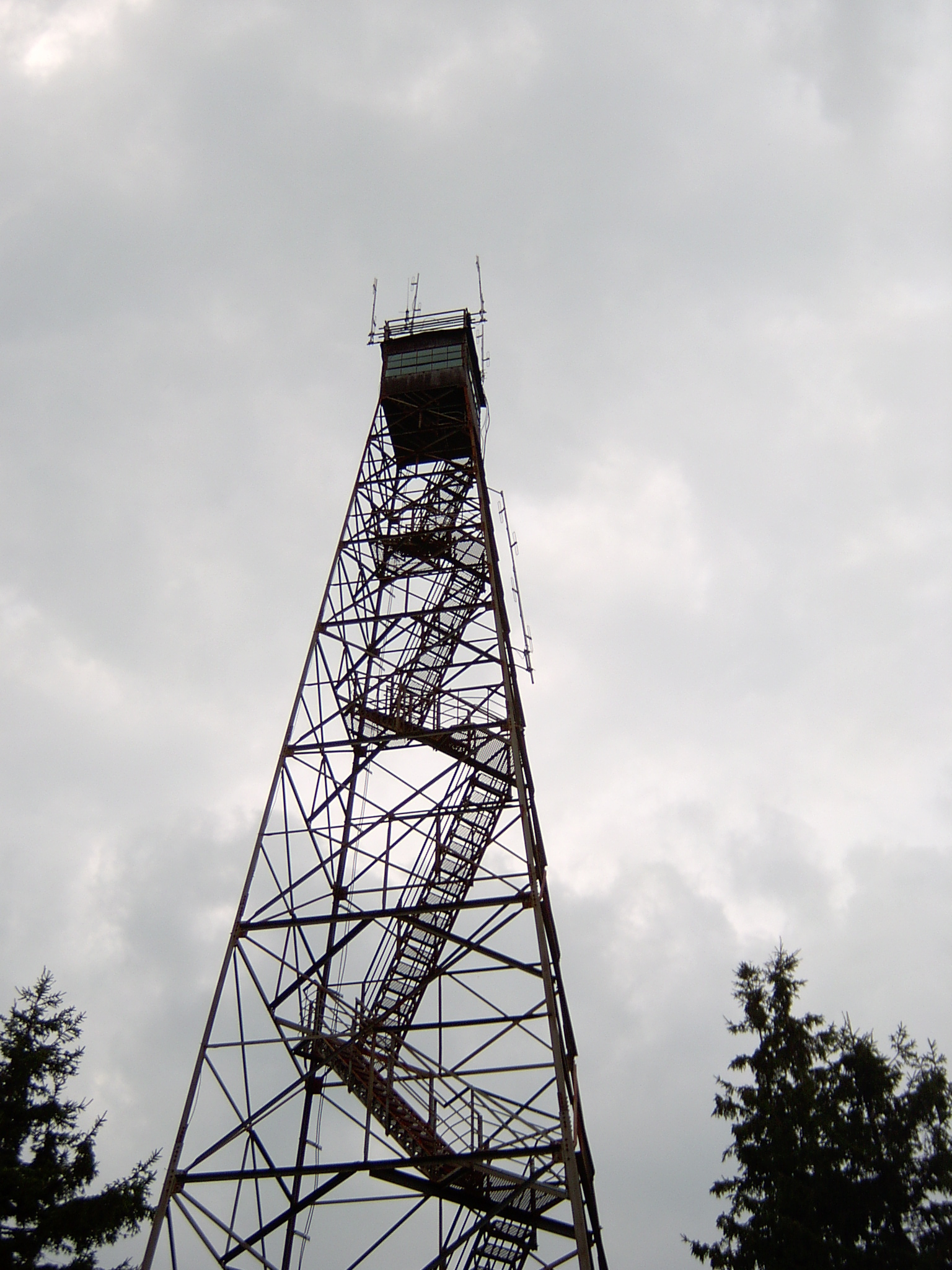
- Olson Observation Tower

- Location within West Virginia
- Location: Tucker, West Virginia, United States
- Coordinates: 39°06′24″N 79°36′12″W
- Elevation: 3,736 ft (1,139 m)
- Website: Olson Observation Tower

Olson Observation Tower is one of the few remaining fire towers in Monongahela National Forest. Olson is located at the southern end of Backbone Mountain northeast of Parsons in Tucker County, West Virginia.

The southern end of Backbone Mountain is the site of West Virginia's first fire tower, originally built by the state in 1922. This tower was later given to Monongahela National Forest, which replaced it in 1963 with the current tower.

The current tower is constructed of steel and features 133 steps leading to a cab on top. While the cab is not open to the public, the entire walkway up to the top is accessible. The tower provides 360-degree views of the surrounding area including the Cheat River watershed, Parsons, Blackwater Canyon, Canaan Mountain, Backbone Mountain and the Otter Creek Wilderness.

Olson Tower is named after Ernst B. Olson in recognition of 28 years of fire control and conservation program service to Monongahela National Forest.

== Other facilities ==
A small picnic area is located along Forest Route 717 near Olson Tower.

== Accessing Olson Tower ==
Olson Tower is located at the end of FR 717, a spur from FR 18. Both roads are gravel but can easily be traversed by normal passenger cars coming from U.S. Route 219 in the west. While FR 18 provides excellent views of Blackwater Canyon east of FR 717, this section of the road is only traversable by high-clearance vehicles. Passenger car travel is not recommended.

== See also ==
- Bickle Knob, site of another Monongahela National Forest observation tower
- Backbone Mountain
- Blackwater Canyon
