= Craig Run East Fork Rockshelter =

- U.S. National Register of Historic Places
- Nearest city: Mills Mountain, West Virginia
- Area: less than one acre
- MPS: Rockshelters on the Gauley Ranger District, Monongahela National Forest MPS
- NRHP reference No.: 93000493
- Added to NRHP: June 3, 1993

Craig Run East Fork Rockshelter is a historic archaeological site located near Mills Mountain, Webster County, West Virginia. It is one of a number of prehistoric rock shelters on the Gauley Ranger District, Monongahela National Forest, that are known to have been utilized prehistorically from the Middle Archaic through the Late Woodland period, c. 6000 B.C. – 1200 A.D. In more recent history, the Craig Run rock shelter is known to have served as a stable for a donkey which was employed in the locust post industry.

It was listed on the National Register of Historic Places in 1993.
