= Big Draft Wilderness =

Protected Wilderness in West Virginia, United States

- IUCN category Ib (wilderness area)
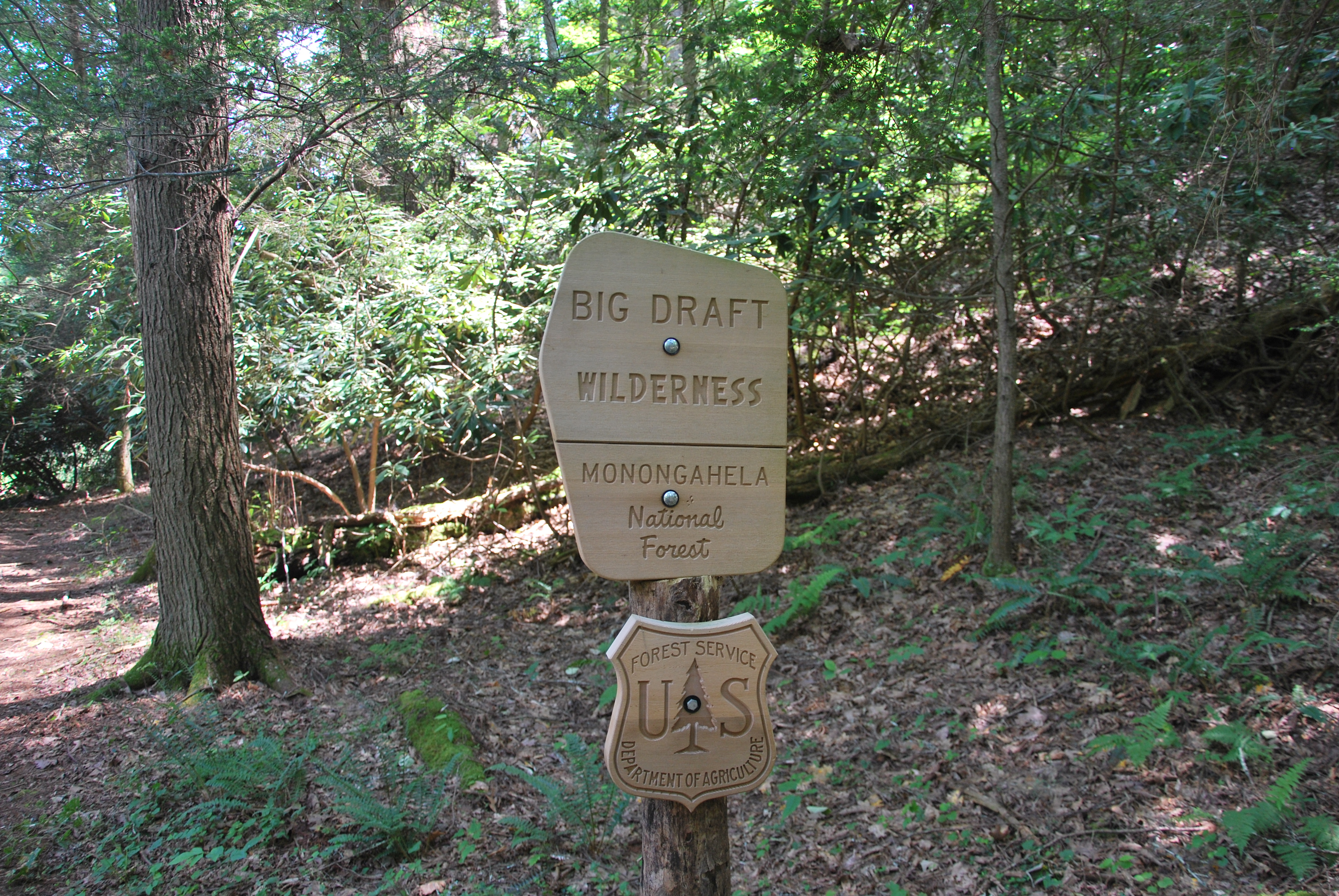
- Big Draft Wilderness sign in 2013

- Location within West Virginia
- Location: Greenbrier, West Virginia, United States
- Coordinates: 37°55′15″N 80°15′55″W
- Area: 5,144 acres (20.82 km^{2})
- Elevation: 1,920 ft (590 m)
- Established: 2009-03-30
- Operator: Monongahela National Forest
- Website: Monongahela National Forest Special Places

The Big Draft Wilderness is a 5,144-acre (2,082 ha) U.S. Wilderness area in the Monongahela National Forest of southeast West Virginia, USA. Its name derives from the nearby Big Draft, a tributary of Anthony Creek which is a tributary of the Greenbrier River. Big Draft Wilderness occupies the southernmost acreage of the Monongahela National Forest and is located just south of the Blue Bend Recreation Area. The town White Sulphur Springs lies about 5 miles south of the Wilderness and about 15 miles northeast of Lewisburg.

== Geography ==
The Big Draft Wilderness is located entirely in Greenbrier County. The Wilderness is drained by the Greenbrier River's Anthony Creek and its tributaries Big Draft and Laurel Creek. The Greenbrier River flows into the New River at Hinton, West Virginia. The New River flows into the Kanawha River, a tributary of the Ohio River.

The Wilderness is located in the Allegheny Mountains, a part of the Appalachian Mountains chain. The highest point in the Wilderness is along Greenbrier Mountain at 3,121 feet (951 m) near the southern boundary of the Wilderness Area. The lowest elevation in the Wilderness is at 1,800 feet (550 m) along the Greenbrier River at the mouth of Anthony Creek where it exits the Wilderness.

== History ==
The Omnibus Public Land Management Act of 2009 created the 5,144 acres (2,082 ha) Big Draft Wilderness. This area is located between Anthony Creek and the southern boundary of the Monongahela National Forest. It protects Anthony Creek watershed which is a popular trout stream. The hiking trails are part of the extensive Monongahela National Forest trail system.

== Hiking trails ==
- Blue Bend Trail - 5.0 miles (8.0 km)
- Anthony Creek Trail - 3.8 miles (6.1 km)
- South Boundary Trail - 4.8 miles (7.7 km)

== See also ==
- List of U.S. Wilderness Areas
- Wilderness Act
