= Otter Creek Wilderness =

Wilderness area in West Virginia, United States

- IUCN category Ib (wilderness area)
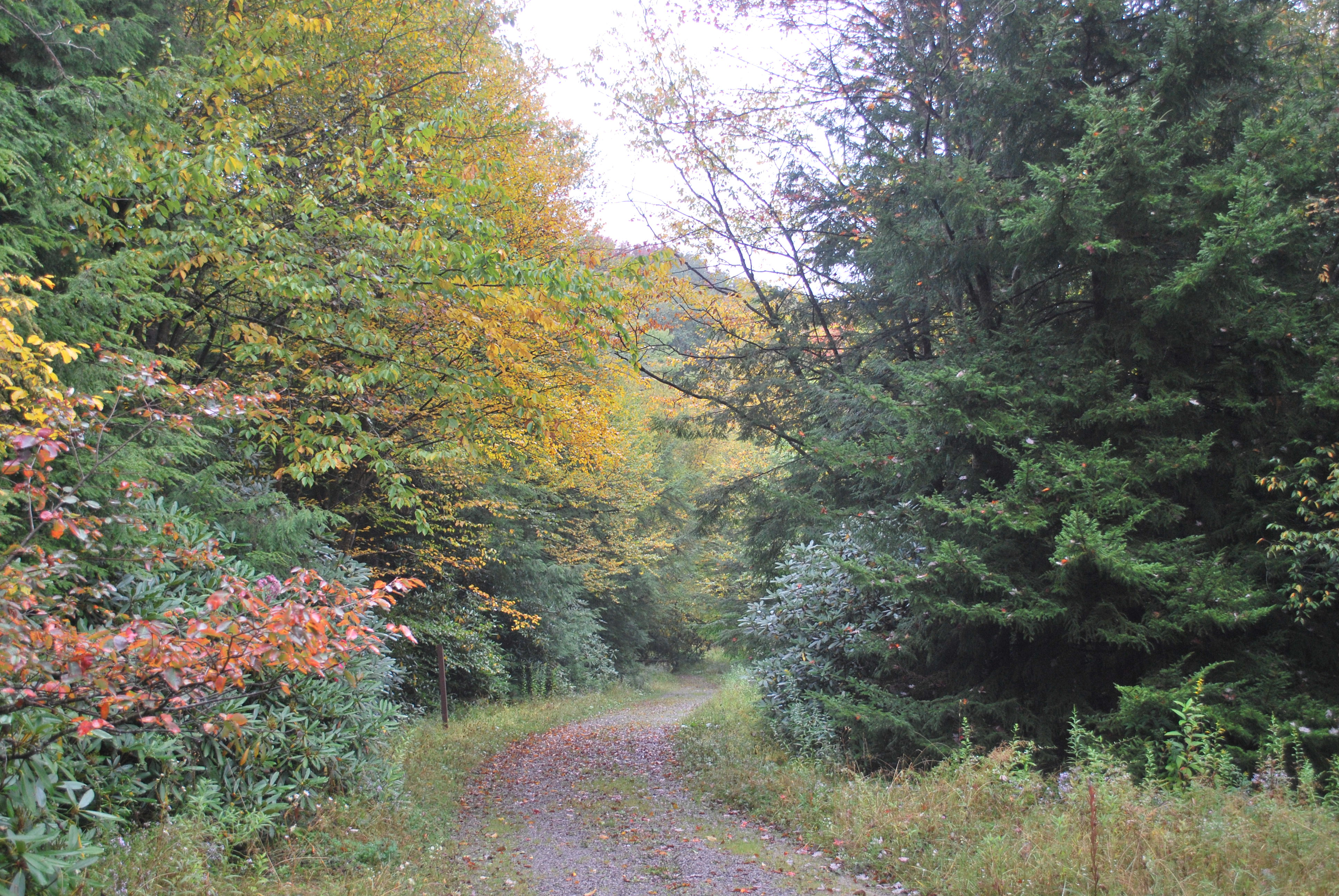
- Otter Creek Trail (shown near Condon Run trailhead) runs the length of the Wilderness.

- Location within West Virginia
- Location: West Virginia, United States
- Coordinates: 39°01′58″N 79°39′13″W
- Area: 20,698 acres (83.76 km^{2})
- Established: 1975
- Operator: Monongahela National Forest
- Website: Otter Creek Wilderness

The Otter Creek Wilderness is a U.S. Wilderness area located in the Cheat-Potomac Ranger District of Monongahela National Forest in West Virginia, USA. The Wilderness sits in a bowl-shaped valley formed by Otter Creek, between McGowan Mountain and Shavers Mountain in Tucker and Randolph Counties. It is crossed by 45 miles (72 km) of hiking trails. Otter Creek Trail is the longest, at 11 miles (18 km).

== History ==
=== Pre-wilderness designation ===
The area now known as Otter Creek Wilderness has a rich history that predates its establishment as a protected natural space. Before European settlement, the land was part of the traditional territory of Native American tribes, including the Shawnee, who used the dense forests and waterways for hunting, fishing, and travel. Early indigenous use of the region is tied to the larger Appalachian culture, which developed over thousands of years and relied on the area's abundant natural resources. Artifacts and traces of indigenous activity suggest that the area was intermittently inhabited or utilized for centuries, with the region's rich biodiversity providing ample resources for local tribes.

By 1914, almost all of the virgin forest in the Otter Creek watershed had been timbered, mostly by the Otter Creek Boom and Lumber Company, but also by the owners of several small farms and homesteads. In 1917 key land purchases were made by the U.S. Forest Service as part of the formation of the national forest system. The Otter Creek area was managed as a multiple use forest, including some second growth logging, until the passage of the Eastern Wilderness Act in 1975. The last private in-holding was acquired the same year.

=== Wilderness designation ===
Otter Creek was designated as a wilderness area in 1975 under the Eastern Wilderness Act, which aimed to protect the last undeveloped lands in the eastern U.S. Conservationists advocated for the area due to its rare species and remote location. Though impacted by logging in the early 20th century, Otter Creek's rugged terrain allowed for natural recovery. The wilderness status ensured the protection of its ecosystem from further development and logging, preserving the area's ecological value for future generations.

=== 2009 addition ===
The Omnibus Public Lands Management Act of 2009 added 698 acres (282 ha) to the original 20,000 acres (8,100 ha) of the Otter Creek Wilderness. This addition is situated on the northern and eastern flanks of McGowan Mountain leading down to Dry Fork. It provides much of the scenic view for this popular river which contains excellent whitewater paddling and trout fishing.

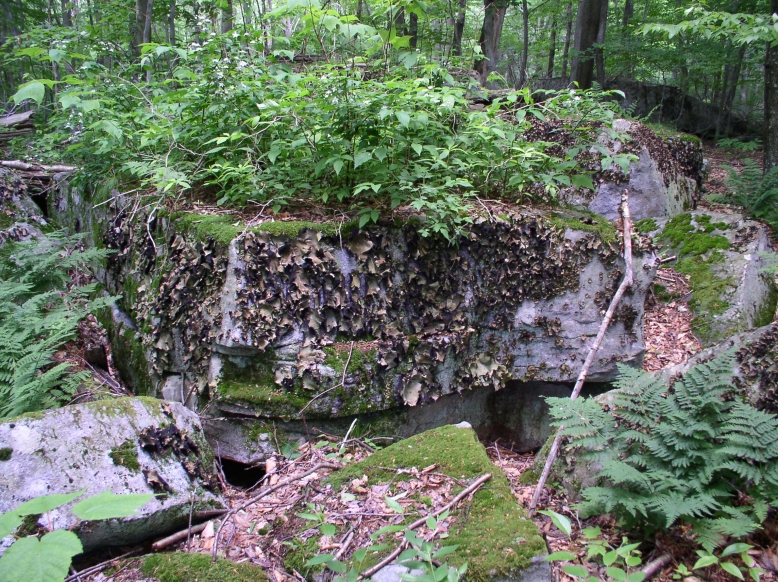
Lichen covered boulder in Otter Creek Wilderness. (The species is Umbilicaria mammulata.)

== Ecology ==
Otter Creek Wilderness is home to a diverse array of plant and animal species, some of which are rare or threatened. The area's varied topography, ranging from steep hillsides to flat valleys, creates a mix of habitats that support rich biodiversity. The wilderness is especially noted for its old-growth forests, including stands of red spruce, eastern hemlock, and hardwood species such as oak and maple.

=== Vascular flora ===
Surveys of Otter Creek Wilderness and adjacent areas, including the Fernow Experimental Forest, have documented over 460 species of vascular plants across 94 families. Dominant vegetation includes red spruce, eastern hemlock, and a variety of hardwoods such as maple and oak. The region also supports several rare and non-native species. Rich understory plants, ferns, and mosses thrive in the moist, shaded valleys, contributing to the area's high botanical value. Approximately 12% of the documented vascular plant species in the Otter Creek Wilderness and adjacent Fernow Experimental Forest are classified as non-native. These species likely established themselves through historical land use practices, including logging, farming, and roadbuilding, which disturbed the landscape and created opportunities for invasive plants to spread.

=== Fauna ===
The wilderness supports a variety of wildlife, including species typical of the Appalachian region. While specific studies on fauna within Otter Creek are limited, the surrounding Monongahela National Forest is known to host black bears, white-tailed deer, wild turkeys, and various small mammals, birds, and amphibians. The area's streams, such as Otter Creek, provide habitats for fish species, including brook trout, which thrive in cold, clear waters.
