= Fernow Experimental Forest =

Experimental forest in West Virginia, USA

- IUCN category VI (protected area with sustainable use of natural resources)
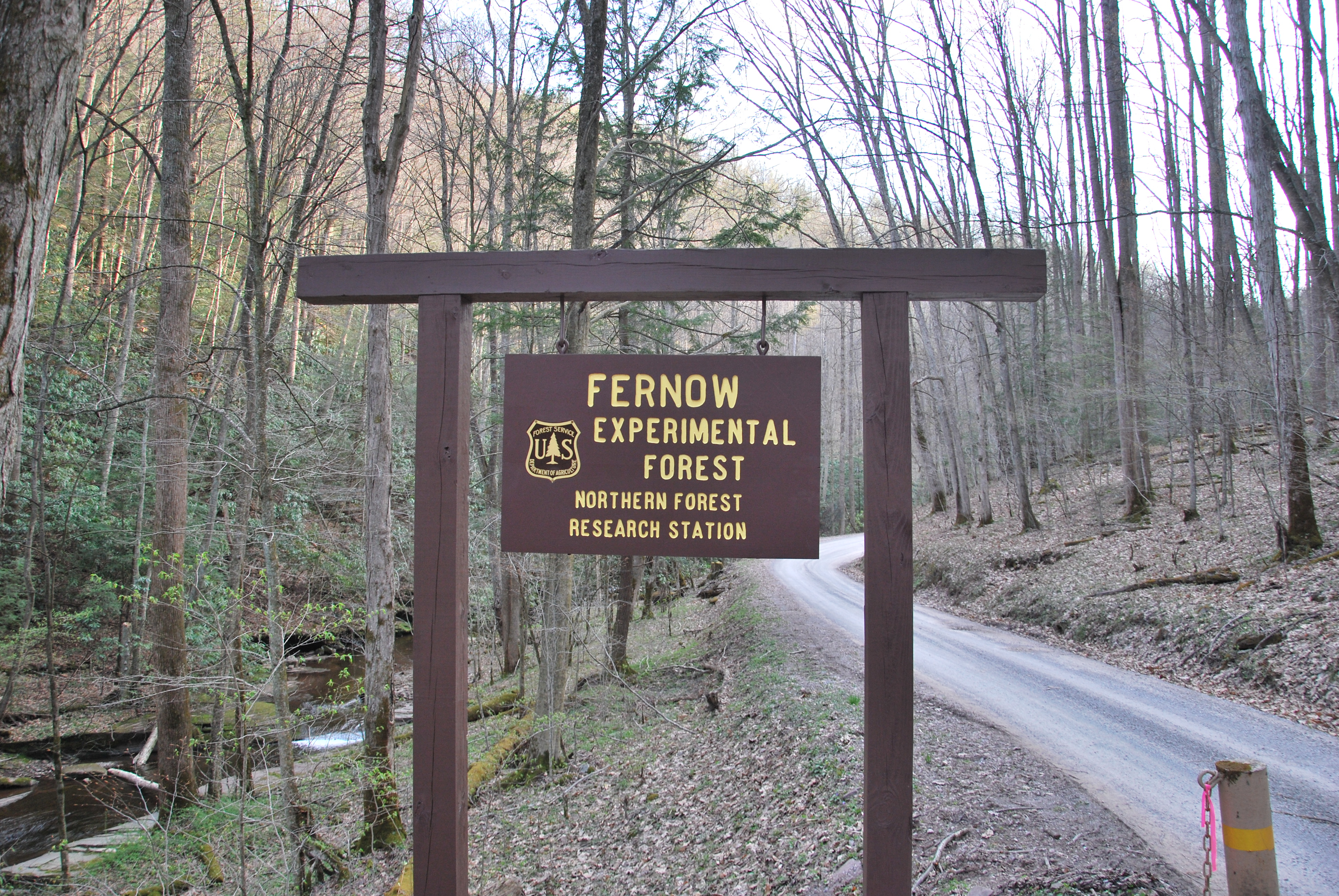
- Entrance sign along FR 701

- Location within West Virginia
- Location: Tucker, West Virginia, United States
- Coordinates: 39°03′15″N 79°41′15″W
- Area: 4,700 acres (19 km^{2})
- Established: 1934
- Named for: Bernhard Fernow.
- Website: Fernow Experimental Forest

Fernow Experimental Forest is a research forest in Tucker County, West Virginia. It is operated by the U.S. Forest Service's Northern Research Station. It is named for Bernhard Fernow, a prominent forester in the late 19th century and early 20th century.

== History ==
The area that now makes up Fernow was heavily logged between 1905 and 1911. In 1934, the drainage basin of Elklick Run in Monongahela National Forest was set aside to create the current research forest.

In the beginning, foresters studied high-elevation red spruce and the impact of fire on hardwood forests. The forest was closed during World War II but reopened in 1948 to study forest and watershed management in the central Appalachians.

== See also ==
- Monongahela National Forest
