= Sherwood Lake (Berrien County, Michigan) =

- Location within Michigan
- Location: Berrien County
- Coordinates: 42°12′58″N 86°14′17″W
- Type: lake
- Surface area: 12.124 acres (4.906 ha)

Sherwood Lake is a lake in Berrien County, in the U.S. state of Michigan. It has a size of 12.124 acres (4.906 ha).

Sherwood Lake has the name of Harvey C. Sherwood, a settler at the lake.
