= Lake Sherwood (West Virginia) =

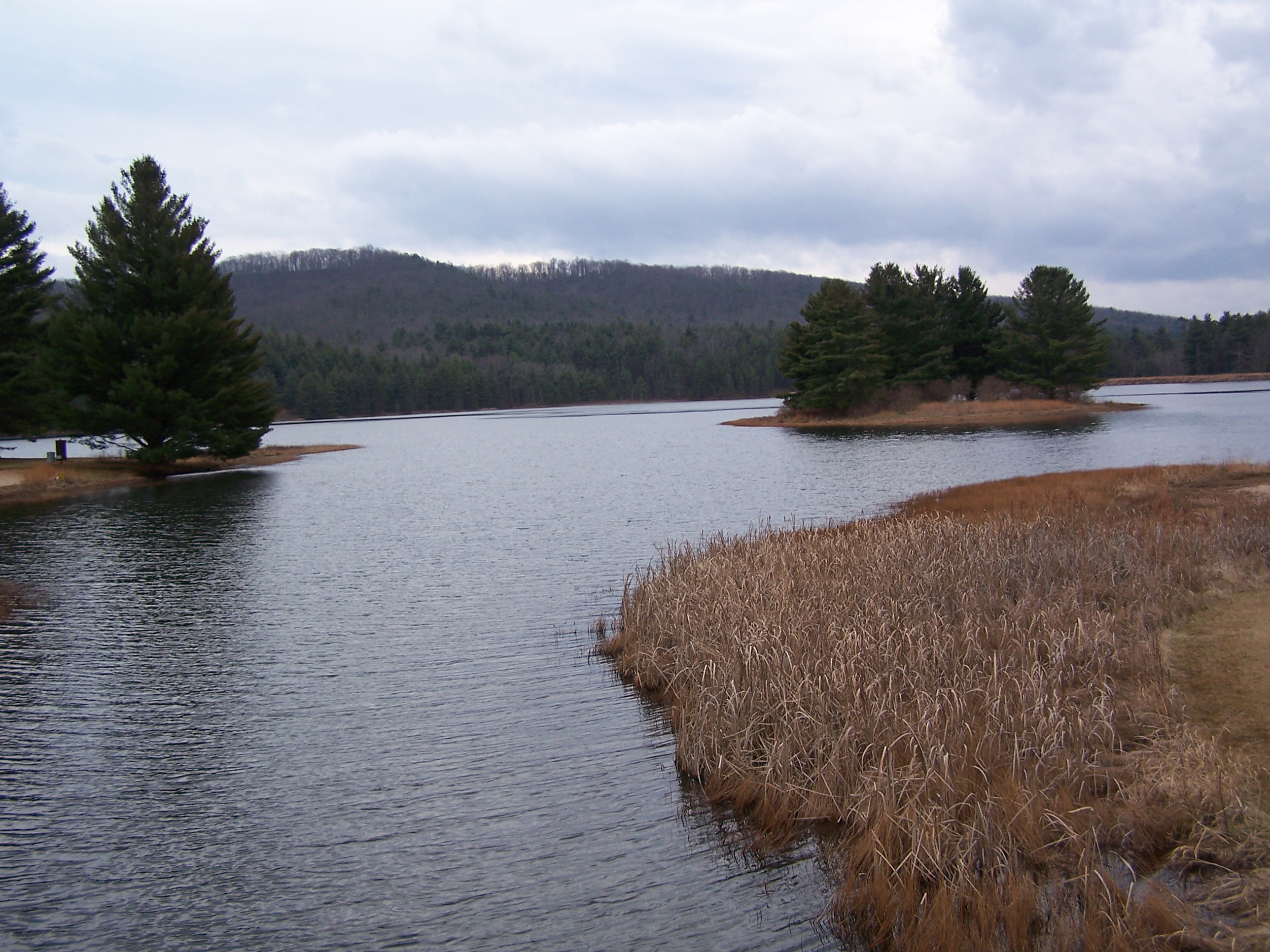
- 2006

- Location within West Virginia
- Location: Greenbrier County, West Virginia
- Coordinates: 38°00′04″N 80°00′37″W
- Type: reservoir
- Basin countries: United States
- Surface area: 164 acres (0.66 km^{2})
- Surface elevation: 2,667 ft (813 m)

Lake Sherwood is a 164-acre (0.66 km^{2}) reservoir located within the Lake Sherwood Recreation Area of the Monongahela National Forest in Greenbrier County, West Virginia, USA. The recreation area surrounding Lake Sherwood contains camping and picnicking facilities as well as a non-fossil fuel boating site and a beach for swimmers. It also includes several easy hiking trails, some with attractive lake views. The lake is located near community of Neola and covers most of the farmland of Richard Rider and Jane Dixon Rider who settled the land around 1790.
