= Bickle Knob =

Mountain summit located east of Elkins in Randolph County, West Virginia

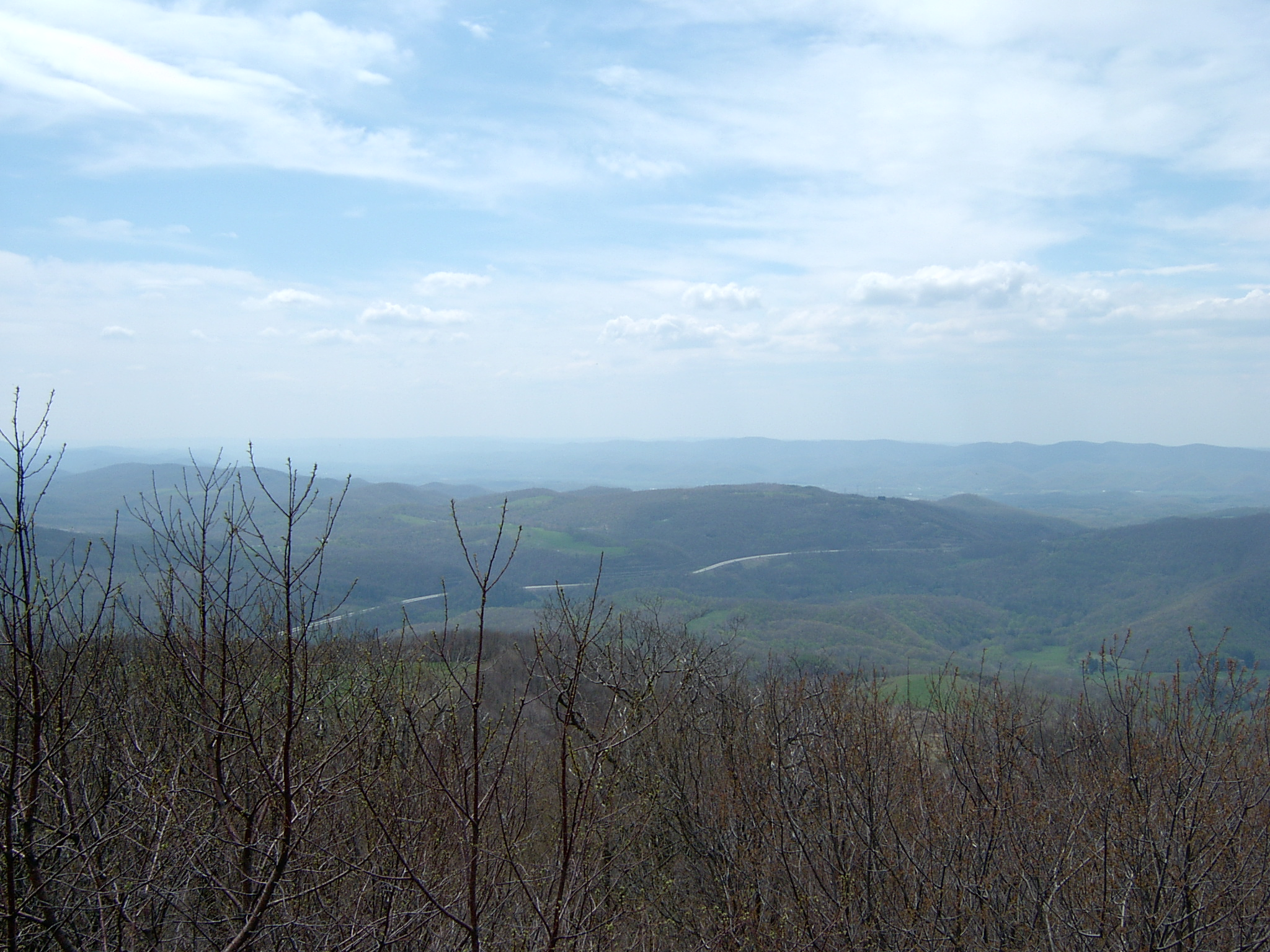
- View looking southwest from Bickle Knob

Highest point
- Elevation: 4,003 ft (1,220 m)
- Prominence: 998 ft (304 m)
- Coordinates: 38°56′03″N 79°43′53″W

Geography
- Location within West Virginia
- Location: Randolph, West Virginia, United States

Climbing
- Access: drive-up via FR 91A

Bickle Knob is a mountain summit located east of Elkins in Randolph County, West Virginia, USA. Easily accessible during warm-weather months, Bickle Knob is also home to one of the few remaining observation towers in Monongahela National Forest.

== Observation tower ==
The most prominent feature of Bickle Knob is its observation tower. Formerly a fire tower, the original cab has been removed and replaced with a wooden viewing platform. The observation tower provides 360-degree views of the surrounding area including the Shavers Fork River, Tygart Valley River valley, and the U.S. Route 33 crossing of Cheat Mountain. The tower is not handicapped-accessible.

== Other facilities ==
A pit toilet is located at Bickle Knob. The site formerly featured a small picnic ground, which has since been removed. **pit toilet has been removed, as well.

== Access ==
Bickle Knob is located at the end of Forest Route 91A, a spur from Stuart Memorial Drive (FR 91). Both roads are gravel but can easily be traversed by normal passenger cars. Stuart Memorial Drive is a scenic path as it traces the edge of the Shavers Fork canyon. Due to the high elevation of the area and the fact that FR 91 is not plowed in the winter, the road may be hazardous when snow is present.

== See also ==
- Olson Observation Tower, another Monongahela National Forest observation tower
