= Lake Sherwood (Florida) =

Coordinates: 28.55116872°N 81.49785187°W

- Location within Florida Location within the United States
- Location: Between Ocoee, Florida and Orlando, Florida
- Type: Natural freshwater lake
- Basin countries: United States
- Max. length: 5,000 ft (1,500 m)
- Max. width: 2,650 ft (810 m)
- Surface area: 160 acres (65 ha)
- Average depth: 10 ft (3.0 m)
- Water volume: 565,221,888 US gallons (2.13959760×10^{9} L; 470,645,675 imp gal)
- Surface elevation: 79 ft (24 m)
- Islands: 1 islet

Lake Sherwood, just southeast of Florida State Road 429, is a natural freshwater lake west of Orlando, Florida, in Orange County, Florida, United States.

This lake is surrounded by residential housing and retail establishments. Two roads cross the lake via bridges. Colonial Drive, an east to west street, crosses its middle and Florida State Road 429 cuts across the southern portion of the lake. Much of the lake shore is swampy. Lake Sherwood is listed in the Orange County Wateratlas as a private lake; there is no public access along its shores.
