= Anthony, West Virginia =

Unincorporated community in West Virginia, United States

- Unincorporated community
- Location within West Virginia Location within the United States
- Coordinates: 37°53′45″N 80°19′55″W
- Country: United States
- State: West Virginia
- County: Greenbrier
- Elevation: 1,847 ft (563 m)
- Time zone: UTC-5 (Eastern (EST))
  - Summer (DST): UTC-4 (EDT)
- Area codes: 304 & 681
- GNIS feature ID: 1553732

Anthony is an unincorporated community in Greenbrier County, West Virginia, United States. Anthony is located along the Greenbrier River, south of Falling Spring.
