= Monongahela National Forest =

National forest in West Virginia, United States

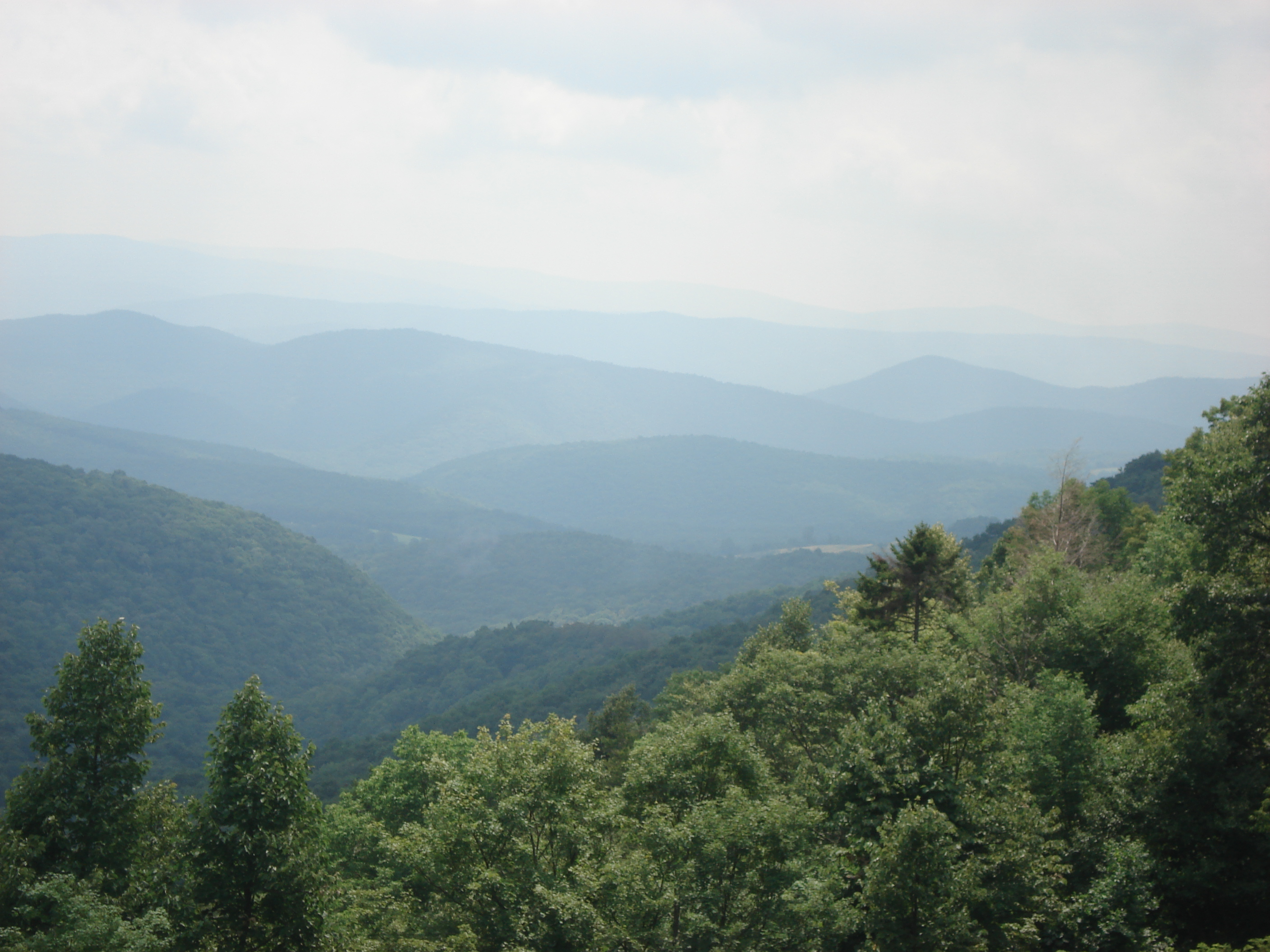
- View from the slopes of Back Allegheny Mountain looking east. Visible are Allegheny Mountain (middle distance) and Shenandoah Mountain (far distance). The latter is in the George Washington National Forest of Virginia.

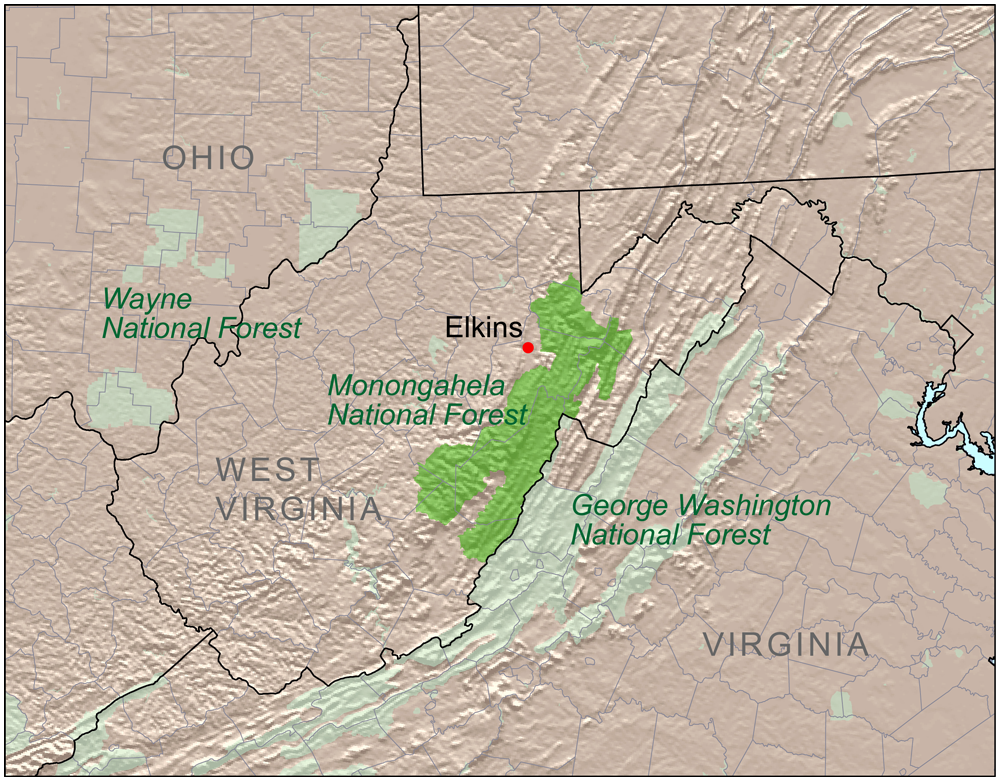
- Location of Monongahela National Forest
- Location: West Virginia, United States
- Coordinates: 38°55′45″N 79°50′52″W
- Area: 921,150 acres (3,727.8 km^{2})
- Established: April 28, 1920
- Named for: Monongahela River, in whose watershed much of the original forest was located
- Website: https://www.fs.usda.gov/main/mnf/home

The Monongahela National Forest is a national forest located in the Allegheny Mountains of eastern West Virginia, US. It protects over 921,000 acres (3,727 km^{2}; 1,439 sq mi) of federally managed land within a 1,700,000 acres (6,880 km^{2}; 2,656 sq mi) proclamation boundary that includes much of the Potomac Highlands Region and portions of 10 counties.

The Monongahela National Forest includes some major landform features such as the Allegheny Front and the western portion of the Ridge-and-valley Appalachians. Within the forest boundaries lie some of the highest mountain peaks in the state, including the highest, Spruce Knob (4,863 ft). Spruce Knob is also the highest point in the Allegheny Mountains. Approximately 75 tree species are found in the forest. Almost all of the trees are a second growth forest, grown back after the land was heavily cut over around the start of the 20th century. Species for which the forest is important include red spruce (Picea rubens), balsam fir (Abies balsamea), and mountain ash (Sorbus americana).

The Monongahela National Forest includes eight U.S. Wilderness Areas and several special-use areas, notably the Spruce Knob–Seneca Rocks National Recreation Area.

== Geography ==
The Monongahela National Forest encompasses most of the southern third of the Allegheny Mountains range (a section of the vast Appalachian Mountains range) and is entirely within the state of West Virginia. Elevations within the Monongahela National Forest range from about 900 feet (270 m) at Petersburg to 4,863 feet (1,482 m) at Spruce Knob. A rain shadow effect caused by slopes of the Allegheny Front results in 60 inches (1,500 mm) of annual precipitation on the west side and about half that on the east side.

Headwaters of six major river systems are located within the forest: Monongahela, Potomac, Greenbrier, Elk, Tygart, and Gauley. Twelve rivers are currently under study for possible inclusion in the National Wild and Scenic Rivers System.

== Administration ==
The main administrative headquarters is located in Elkins, West Virginia. The Monongahela also includes four ranger districts. The forest includes 105 permanent employees, seasonal employees, and volunteers.

Monongahela National Forest is currently divided into four ranger districts. The Cheat-Potomac and Marlinton-White Sulphur Springs were formed by combining their namesake districts; in the merged districts, the offices for both original districts were retained.

- Cheat-Potomac Ranger District, Headquarters: Parsons, West Virginia
  - Office (former HQ, Potomac Ranger District) at Petersburg, West Virginia
- Gauley Ranger District, Headquarters: Richwood, West Virginia
- Greenbrier Ranger District, Headquarters: Bartow, West Virginia
- Marlinton-White Sulphur Springs Ranger District, Headquarters: Marlinton, West Virginia
  - Office (former HQ, White Sulphur Springs Ranger District) at White Sulphur Springs, West Virginia

== History ==
The Monongahela National Forest was established following the Weeks Act passage in 1911. This act authorized the purchase of land for long-term watershed protection and natural resource management following the massive cutting of the eastern forests in the late 19th and early 20th centuries. In 1915, 7,200 acres (29 km^{2}) were acquired to begin the forest, called the "Monongahela Purchase", and on April 28, 1920, it became the "Monongahela National Forest". By the end of 1924, the Monongahela National Forest had total ownership of some 150,367 acres (609 km^{2}).

Although white-tail deer never vanished from the Monongahela National Forest, from the 1890s to the 1920s their numbers dropped substantially. In January 1930, eight deer procured from Michigan were released into the forest near Parsons. From 1937 to 1939, a total of 17 more deer were released in the Flatrock-Roaring Plains area of the Forest. These releases served as the nucleus for reestablishing the healthy breeding populations of eastern West Virginia. (By the mid-1940s, deer were so numerous in the area that crop farmers had to patrol their fields by night.)

In 1943 and 1944, as part of the West Virginia Maneuver Area, the U.S. Army used parts of the Monongahela National Forest as a practice artillery and mortar range and maneuver area before troops were sent to Europe to fight in World War II. Artillery and mortar shells shot into the area for practice are still occasionally found there today. Seneca Rocks and other area cliffs were also used for assault climbing instruction. This was the Army's only low-altitude climbing school.

The fisher (Pekania pennanti), believed to have been exterminated in the state by 1912, was reintroduced during the winter of 1969. At that time 23 fishers were translocated from New Hampshire to two sites within the boundaries of the Monongahela National Forest (at Canaan Mountain in Tucker County and Cranberry Glades in Pocahontas County).

In 1980, and again in 2005, the Monongahela National Forest was the venue for the annual counterculture Rainbow Gathering.

In 1993, the Craig Run East Fork Rockshelter and Laurel Run Rockshelter in the Gauley Ranger District were listed on the National Register of Historic Places.

In 2011 West Virginia Senator Joe Manchin requested the National Park Service study the feasibility of transferring the northern portions of Monongahela National Forest to the NPS, including the Spruce Knob–Seneca Rocks National Recreation Area, the Dolly Sods Wilderness, and the Otter Creek Wilderness. Advocates had proposed the area be designated as High Allegheny National Park and Preserve. Interconnecting public lands would become Preserve Areas, where hunting would be allowed; and adjacent private working farms and forests would be eligible for voluntary Heritage Area conservation easements. In October 2011, the National Park Service announced a Reconnaissance Survey, to be conducted from January to September 2012, to "determine whether the historic, natural, and recreational resources in the project area are 'likely' or 'unlikely' to meet congressionally required criteria for the designation of potential units of the National Park System".

Historic Civil War sites within the proposed park and preserve include the Rich Mountain Battlefield, Beverly Historic District, Cheat Summit Fort, Camp Bartow, and Camp Allegheny. The historic Blackwater Industrial Complex in Tucker County—preserving artifacts of the coal, coke and timber empire of early West Virginia entrepreneur and Senator Henry Gassaway Davis—would also be included.

In early 2012 Senator Manchin dropped his request for the study. Commentators on Manchin's approach to the proposal had noted that "the senator seemed to be in favor of a possible NPS label in the area only if there were no changes in existing land use or management practices". In February 2012, the NPS Director observed that some of Manchin's requests were incompatible with longstanding NPS policy, saying in part that "the continuation of extractive activities such as timber harvesting and oil and gas development would make the establishment of a national park infeasible".

== Statistics and general information ==
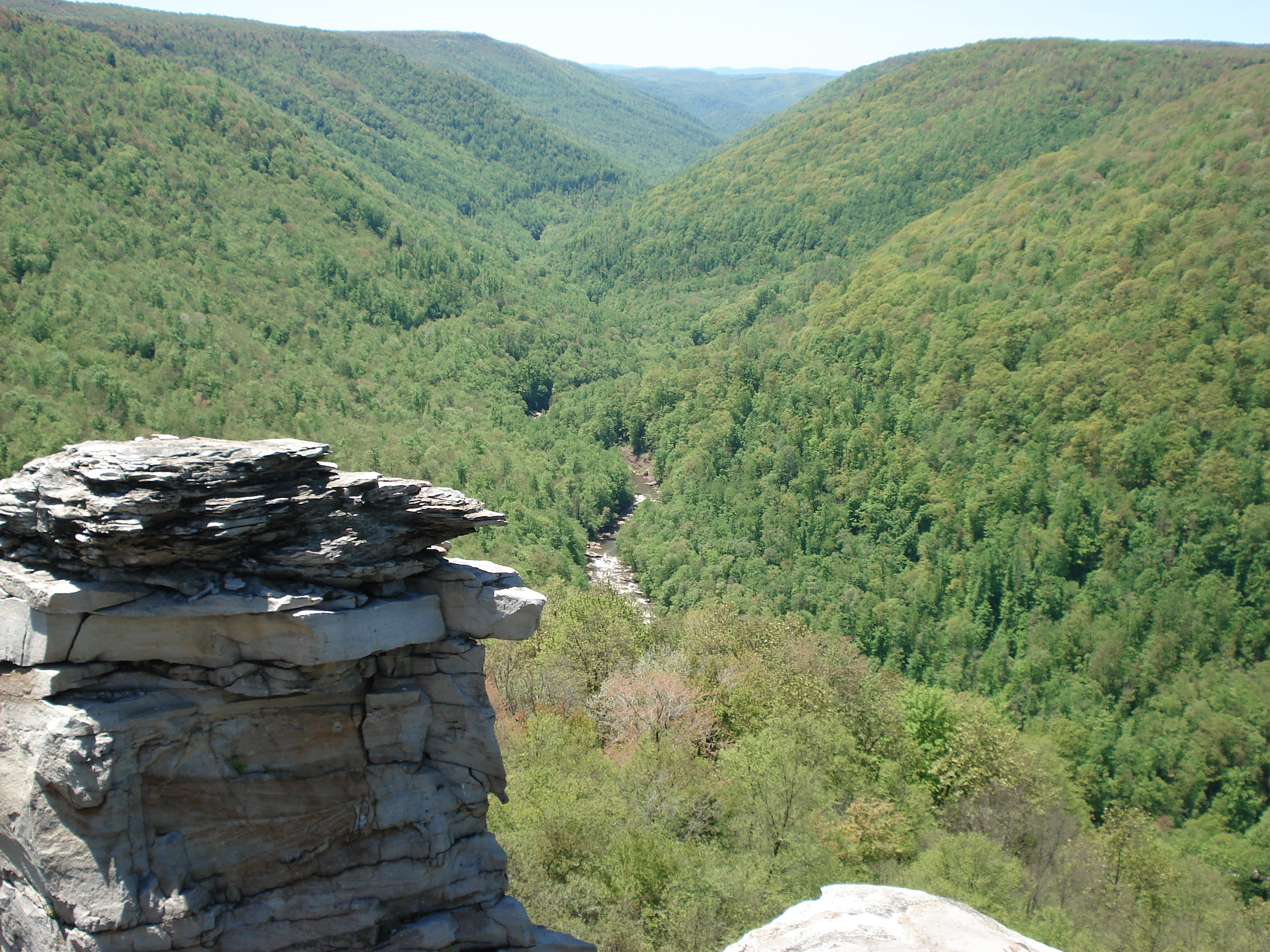
Blackwater Canyon

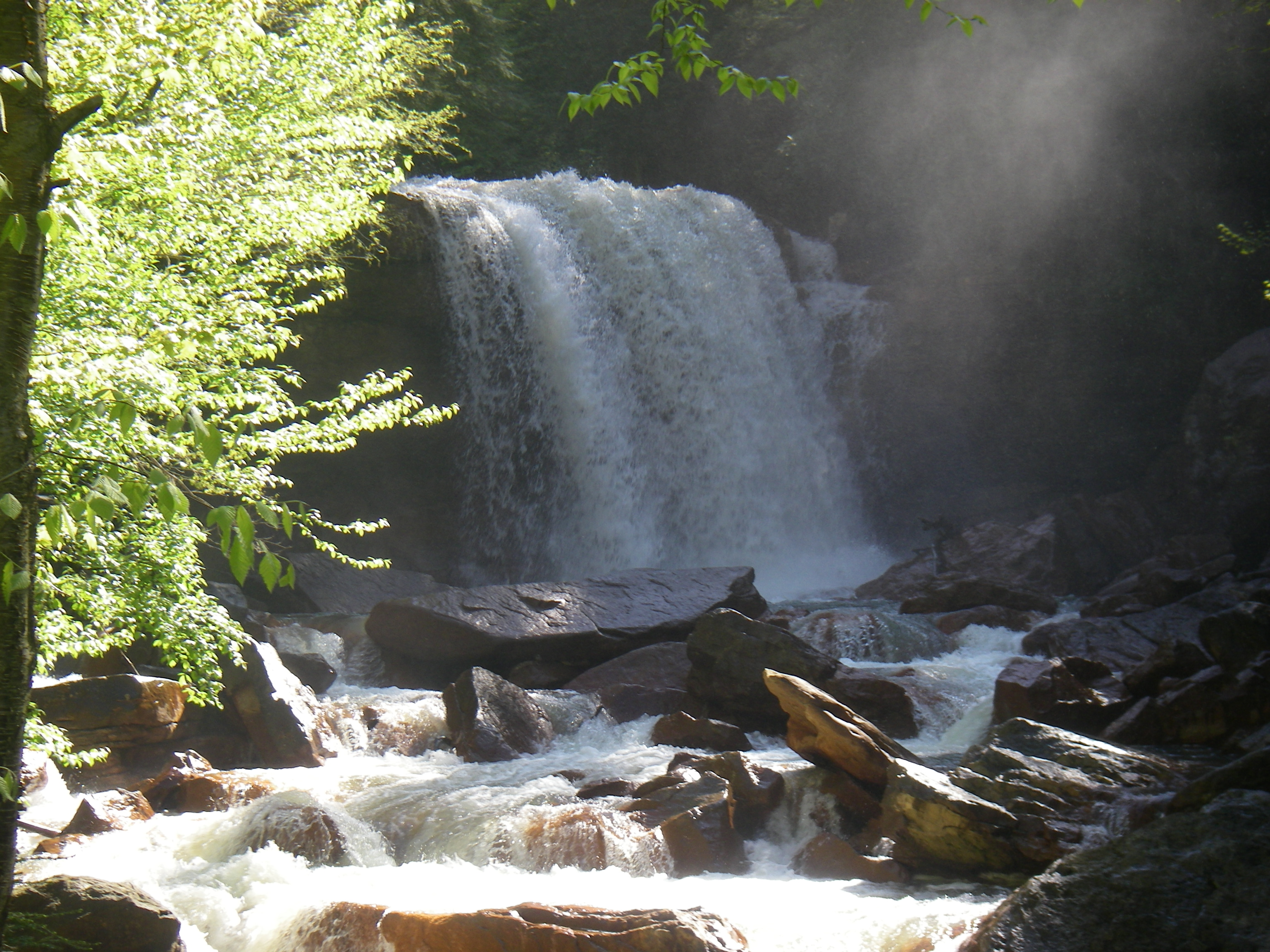
Douglas Falls on the North Fork Blackwater River

=== General ===
- Land area: over 919,000 acres (3,719 km^{2})
- Wilderness areas: 94,991 acres (384 km^{2})
- Roads: 570 miles (920 km)
- Visitor centers: 2 (Cranberry Mountain Nature Center and Seneca Rocks Discovery Center)
- Designated Scenic Areas: 3
- Visitor observation towers: 2 (Bickle Knob Tower and Olson Tower)
- Picnic areas: 17
- Campgrounds: 23
- Snowmobile areas: 1 (Highland Scenic Highway)
- Wildlife management areas (managed with West Virginia Division of Natural Resources): 10
- Warm-water fishing steams: 129 miles (208 km)
- Trout streams: 578 miles (930 km)
- Impoundments (reservoirs): 5

=== Trails ===
- Trails: 825 miles (1,327 km)
  - Outside Wilderness Areas: 660 miles (1,062 km), not counting the 3 newest wildernesses
  - In Wilderness Areas: 165 miles (265 km), not counting the 3 newest wildernesses

=== Natural features ===
- Wilderness areas: 8

=== Sensitive species ===
- Sensitive plants and wildlife: 50
- Threatened and endangered species: 9

== Ecology ==
The forest is noted for its rugged landscape, views, blueberry thickets, highland bogs and "sods", and open areas with exposed rocks. In addition to the second-growth forest trees, the wide range of botanical species found includes rhododendron, laurel on the moist west side of the Allegheny Front, and cactus and endemic shale barren species on the drier eastern slopes.

There are 230 known species of birds inhabiting the Monongahela National Forest: 159 are known to breed there, 89 are Neotropical migrants; 71 transit the forest during migration, but do not breed there, and 17 non-breeding species are Neotropical. The Brooks Bird Club (BBC) conducts an annual bird banding and survey project in the vicinity of Dolly Sods Scenic Area during migration (August – September). The forest provides habitat for 9 federally listed endangered or threatened species: 2 bird species, 2 bat species, 1 subspecies of flying squirrel, 1 salamander species, and 3 plant species. Fifty other species of rare/sensitive plants and animals also occur in the forest.

Larger animals and game species found in the forest include black bear, wild turkey, white-tailed deer, gray and fox squirrels, rabbits, snowshoe hare, woodcock, and grouse. Limited waterfowl habitat exists in certain places. Furbearers include beaver, red and gray fox, bobcat, fisher, river otter, raccoon and mink. Other hunted species include coyotes, skunks, opossums, woodchucks, crows, and weasels. There are 12 species of game (pan) fish and 60 species of nongame or forage fish. Some 90% of the trout waters of West Virginia are within the forest.

== Recreation ==
The Monongahela National Forest is a recreation destination and tourist attraction, hosting approximately 3 million visitors annually. The backwoods road and trail system is used for hiking, mountain biking, and horse riding. Many miles of railroad grades are a link in the recreation use of the forest. (The longest is the Glady to Durbin West Fork Railroad Trail which is 23 miles (37 km) long.) Recreation ranges from self-reliant treks in the wildernesses and backcountry areas, to rock climbing challenges, to traditional developed-site camping. Canoeing, hunting, trapping, fishing, and wildlife viewing are also common uses.

=== Campgrounds ===
The following are developed campgrounds in the forest:

- Bear Heaven Campground
- Big Bend Campground
- Big Rock Campground
- Bird Run Campground
- Bishop Knob Campground
- Blue Bend Recreation Area and Campground
- Cranberry Campground
- Cranberry River Sites
- Day Run Campground
- Gatewood Group Camp
- Horseshoe Campground
- Island Campground
- Jess Judy Group Campground
- Lake Sherwood Recreation Area and Campground
- Laurel Fork Campground
- Lower Glady Dispersed Campground
- Middle Mountain Cabins
- Pocahontas Campground
- Red Creek Campground
- Seneca Shadows Campground
- Spruce Knob Lake Campground
- Stuart Campground
- Stuart Group Campground
- Summit Lake Campground
- Tea Creek Campground
- Williams River sites

== Commercial resources ==
The forest administration maintains wildlife and timber programs aimed at the responsible management of a mixed-age forest. About 81 percent of the total forest area is closed canopy forest over 60 years of age. The tree species most valuable for timber and wildlife food in the Monongahela National Forest are black cherry and oaks. The forest's commercial timber sale program averages 30 mbf (thousand board feet) of timber sold per year with a yearly average value of $7.5 million. Various cutting techniques are used, from cutting single trees to clearcutting blocks up to 25 acres (100,000 m^{2}) in size. Regeneration cuts (clear-cuts or other treatments designed to start a new timber stand) occur on approximately 1,300 acres (5.3 km^{2}) yearly out of the more than 909,000 acres (3,680 km^{2}) forest total.

Mineral resources located in the Monongahela National Forest include coal, gas, limestone, and gravel. Sheep and cattle grazing occurs on about 7,000 acres (28 km^{2}).

Receipts for timber, grazing, land uses, minerals, and recreation use averaged $4,840,466 annually between FY92 and FY96, and 25% of that (an average of $1,210,116 per year) was returned to counties that include Monongahela National Forest lands. This money is intended for use by local schools and roads. The remaining 75% each year is returned to the U.S. Treasury.

== Areas of interest ==
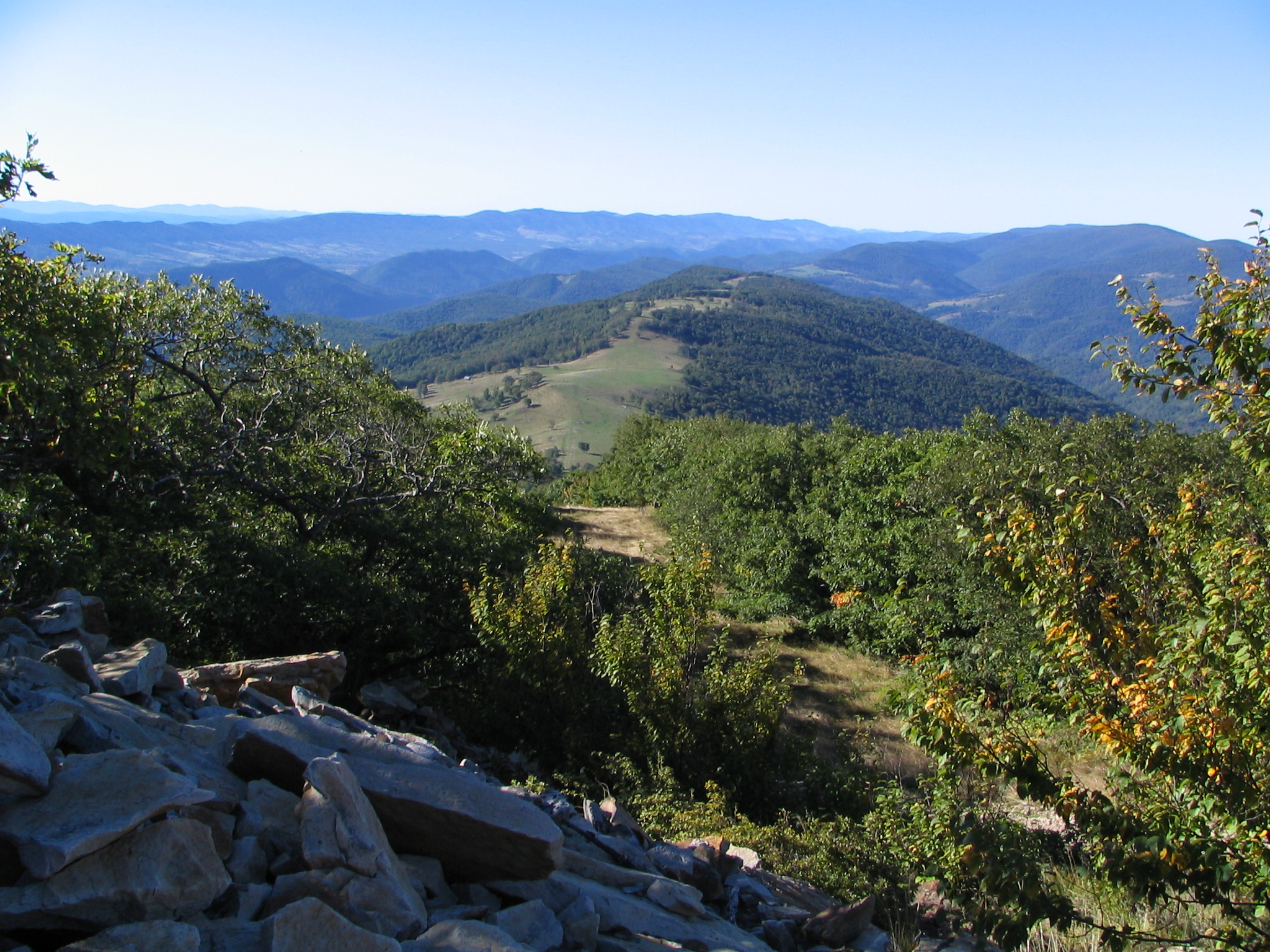
Roaring Plains Wilderness

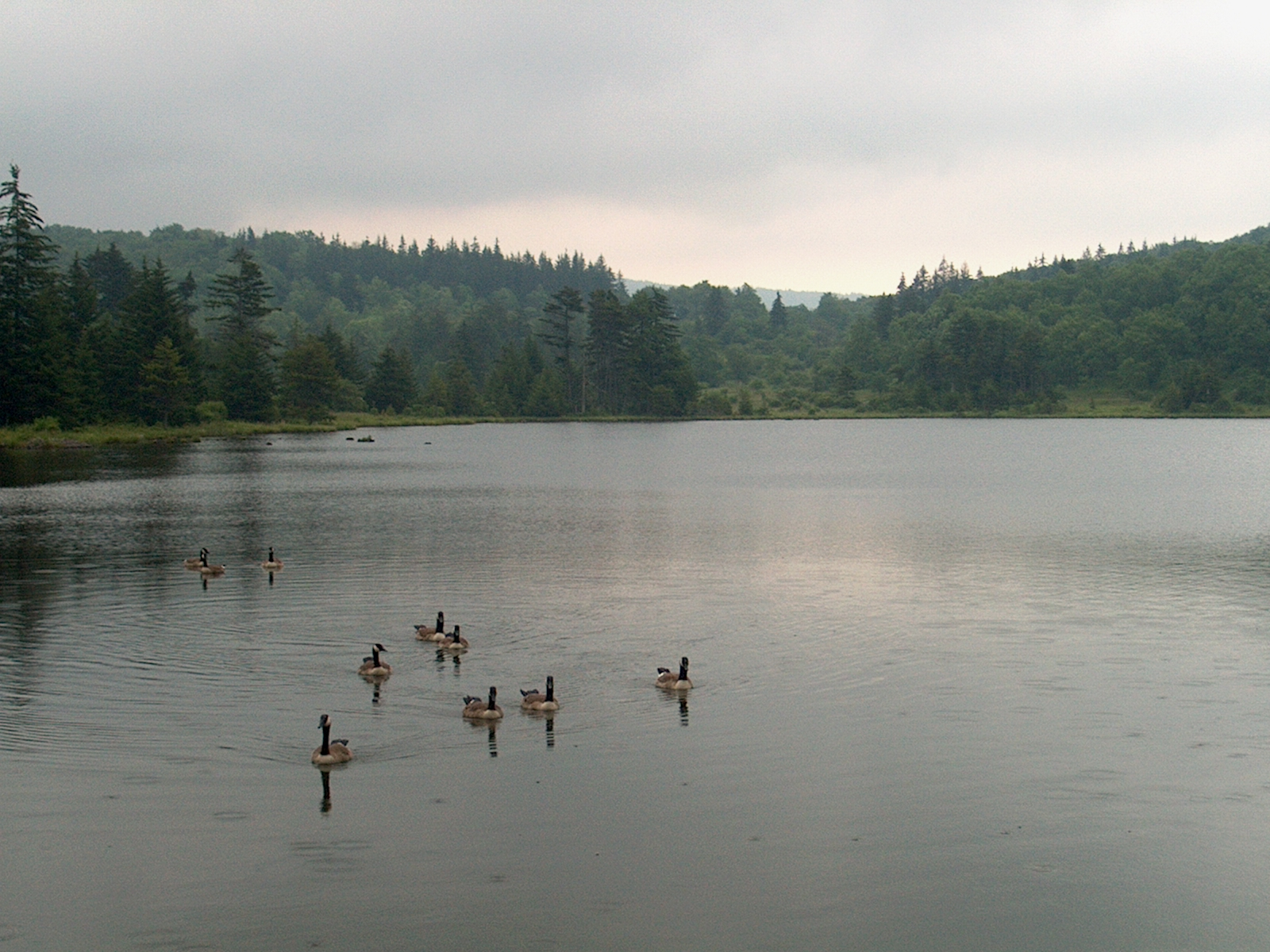
Canada geese in Spruce Knob Lake

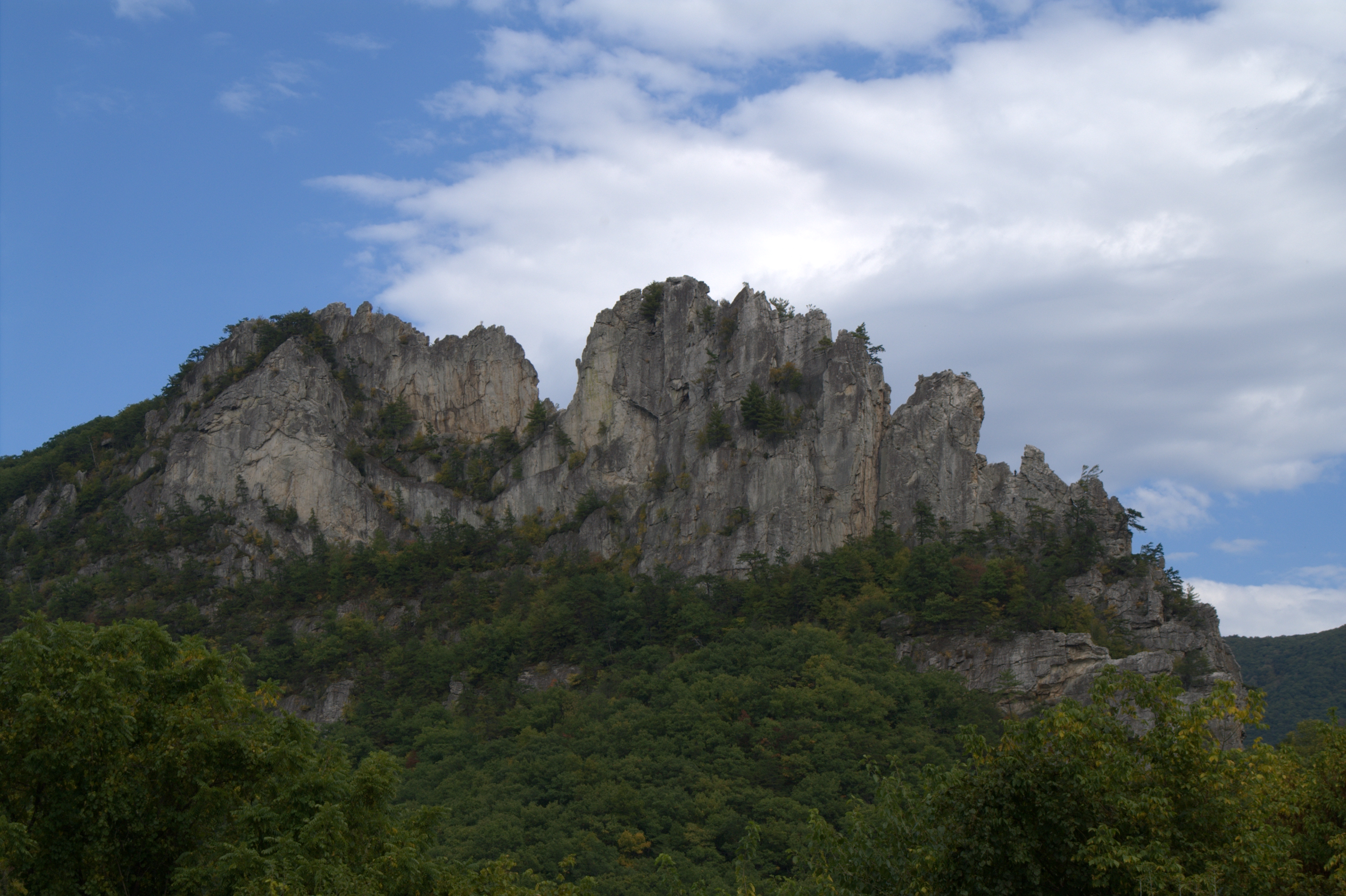
Seneca Rocks

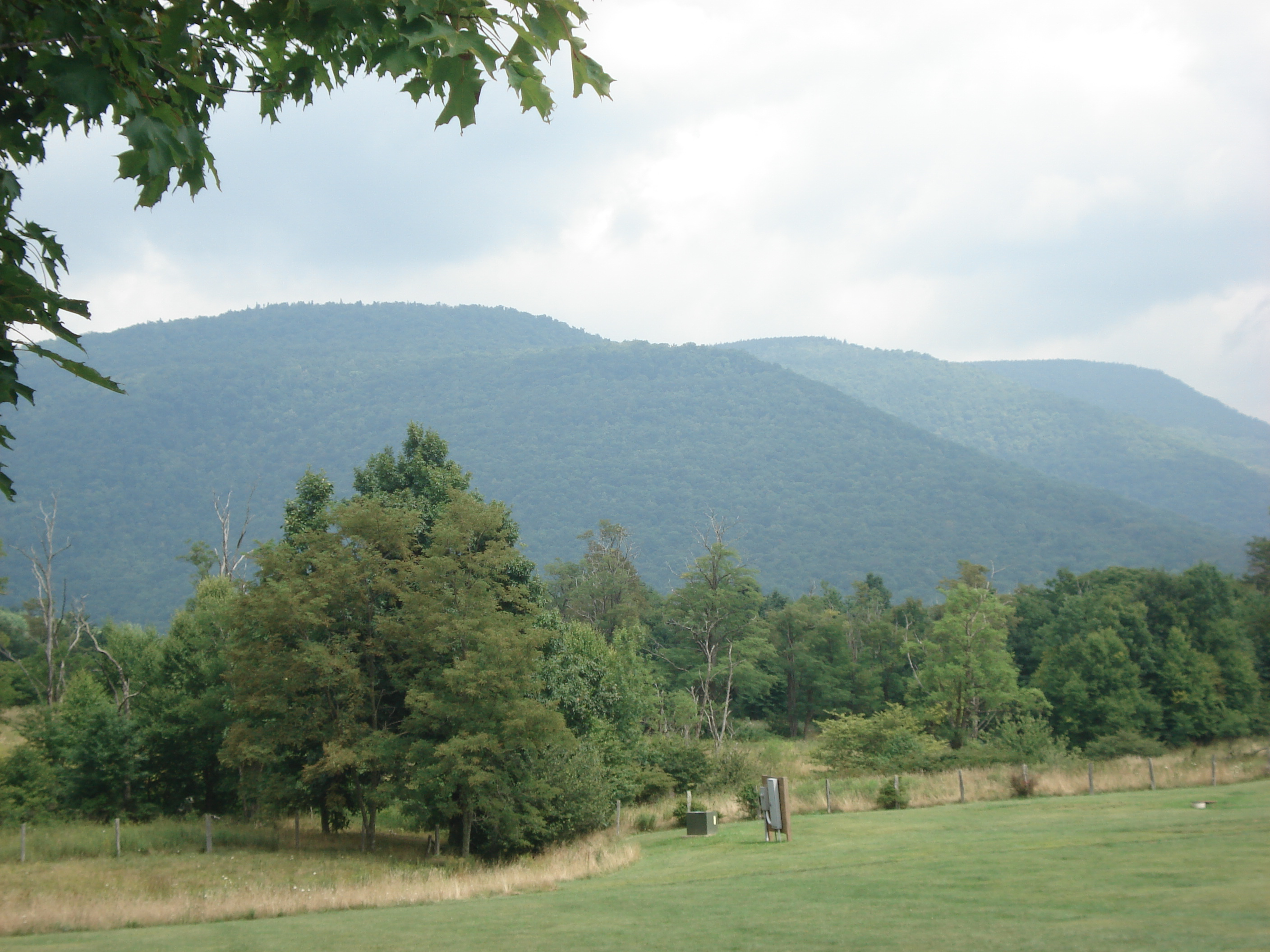
Back Allegheny Mountain

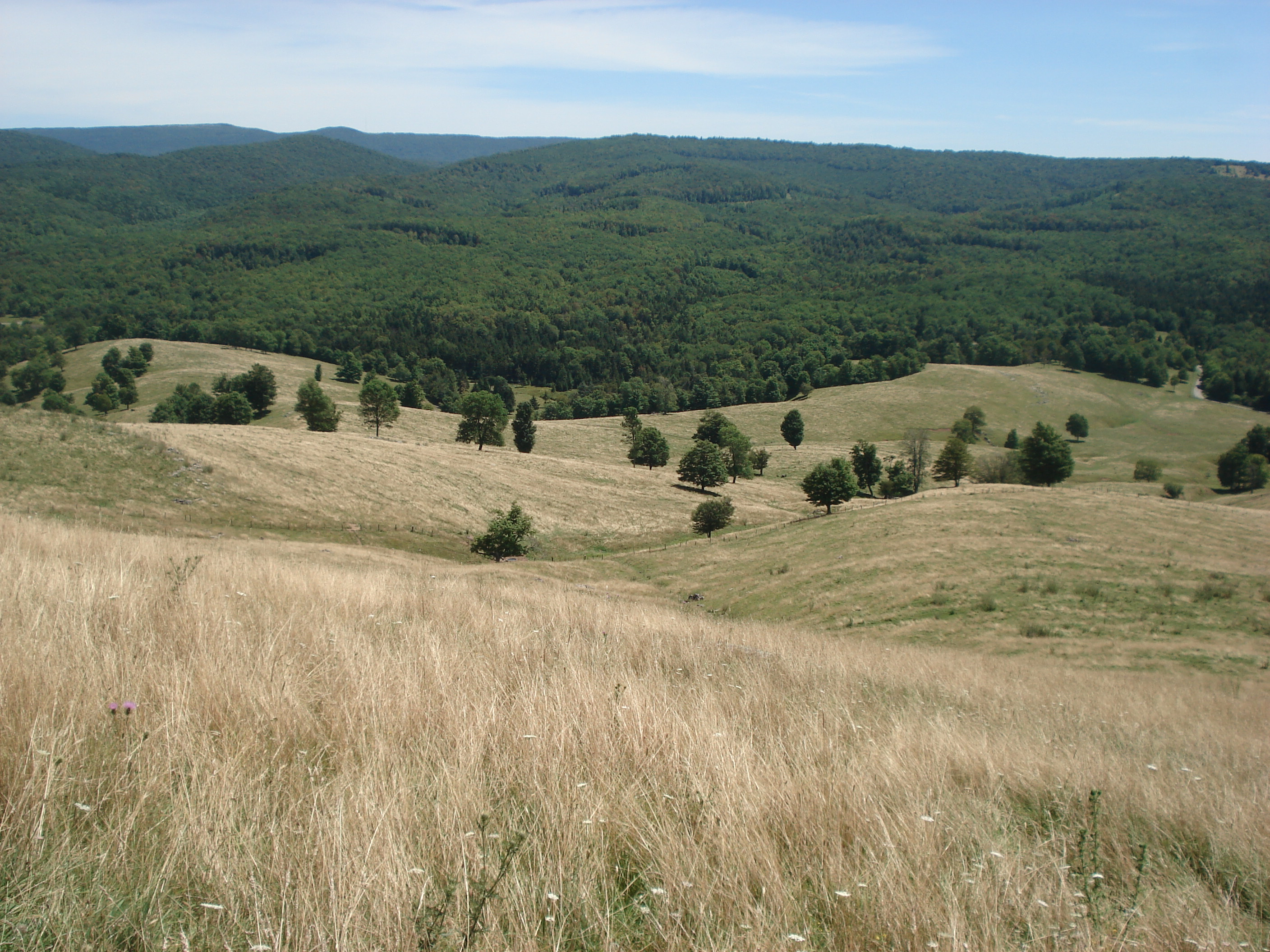
View from atop Yokum Knob

=== Spruce Knob–Seneca Rocks National Recreation Area ===
- Spruce Knob
- Seneca Rocks
- River Knobs
- Spruce Knobs lake
- Sites Homestead
- Smoke Hole Canyon

=== Wilderness Areas ===
- Big Draft Wilderness, 5,144 acres (21 km^{2})
- Cranberry Wilderness, 47,815 acres (194 km^{2})
- Dolly Sods Wilderness, 17,371 acres (70 km^{2})
- Laurel Fork North Wilderness, 6,055 acres (25 km^{2})
- Laurel Fork South Wilderness, 5,784 acres (23 km^{2})
- Otter Creek Wilderness, 20,698 acres (84 km^{2})
- Roaring Plains West Wilderness, 6,792 acres (27 km^{2})
  - Mount Porte Crayon
- Spice Run Wilderness, 6,030 acres (24 km^{2})

=== National Natural Landmarks ===
- Big Run Bog
- Blister Run Swamp
- Canaan Valley
- Cranberry Glades Botanical Area
- Fisher Spring Run Bog
- Gaudineer Scenic Area
- Germany Valley Karst Area
- Shavers Mountain Spruce-Hemlock Stand
- Sinnett-Thorn Mountain Cave System

=== Sites listed on the National Register of Historic Places ===
Only sites actually on USFS land are listed here.

- Rohrbaugh Cabin
- Craig Run East Fork Rockshelter
- Laurel Run Rockshelter
- Sites Homestead

=== Stands of old-growth forest ===
Some 318 acres (1.29 km^{2}) of true old-growth forest have been documented within the Monongahela National Forest. The largest of these areas are:

- Fanny Bennett Hemlock Grove, a 70-acre (280,000 m^{2}) eastern hemlock stand
- Gaudineer Scenic Area, 50 acres of virgin red spruce forest
- North Fork Mountain Red Pine Botanical Area, 10 acres of red pine old growth forest
- North Spruce Mountain Old Growth Site, about 17 acres (69,000 m^{2})
- Shavers Mountain Spruce-Hemlock Stand, a 68-acre (280,000 m^{2}) red spruce-hemlock stand, partly in the Otter Creek Wilderness
- Virgin White Pine Botanical Area, a 13-acre (53,000 m^{2}) white pine stand

=== Other features ===
- Fernow Experimental Forest
- Lake Sherwood
- Summit Lake
- Falls of Hills Creek
- Highland Scenic Highway
- Williams River
- Stuart Memorial Drive
- Flatrock Plains
- Sinks of Gandy Creek

== Gallery ==
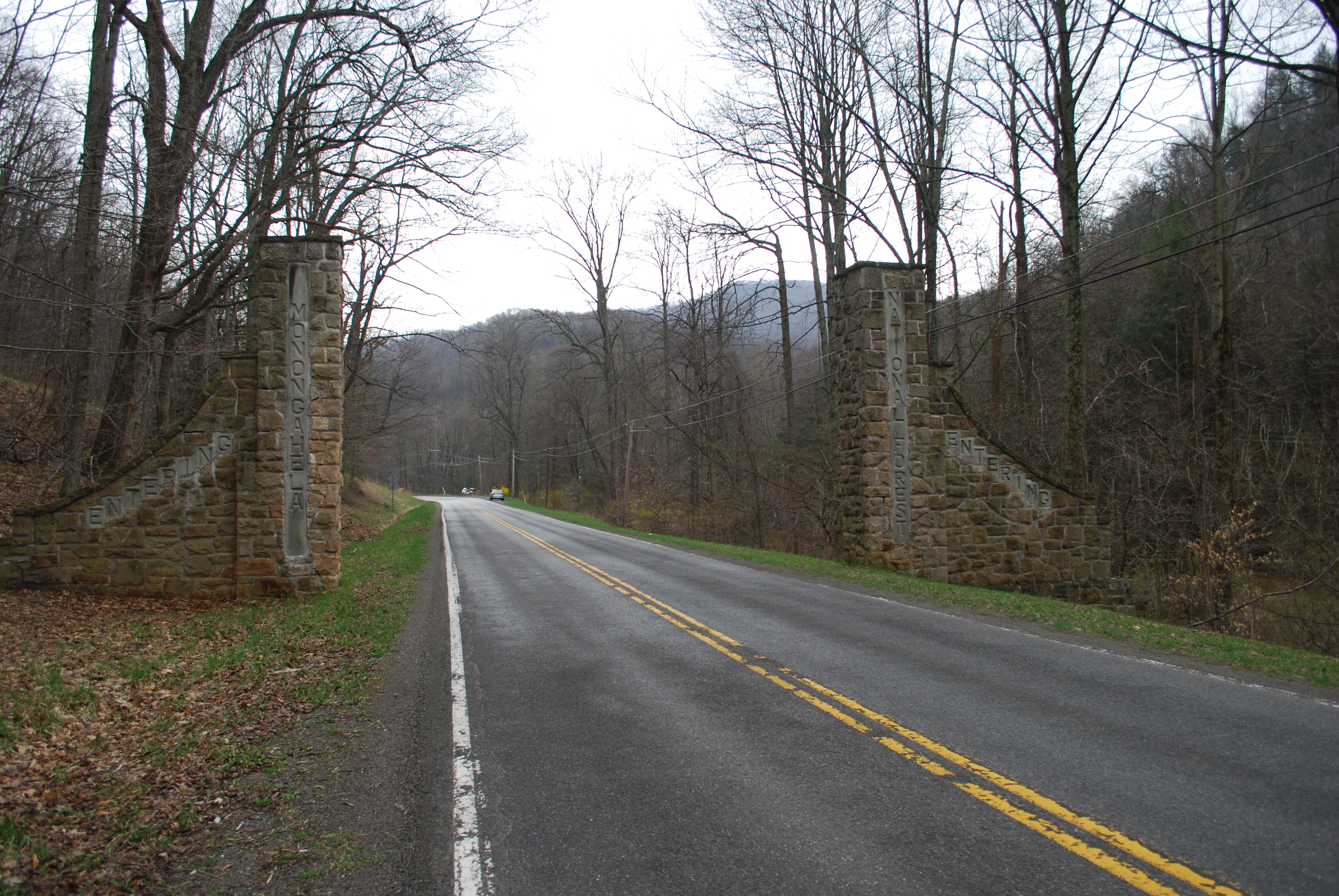
Entrance gate along Old US 33 east of Elkins

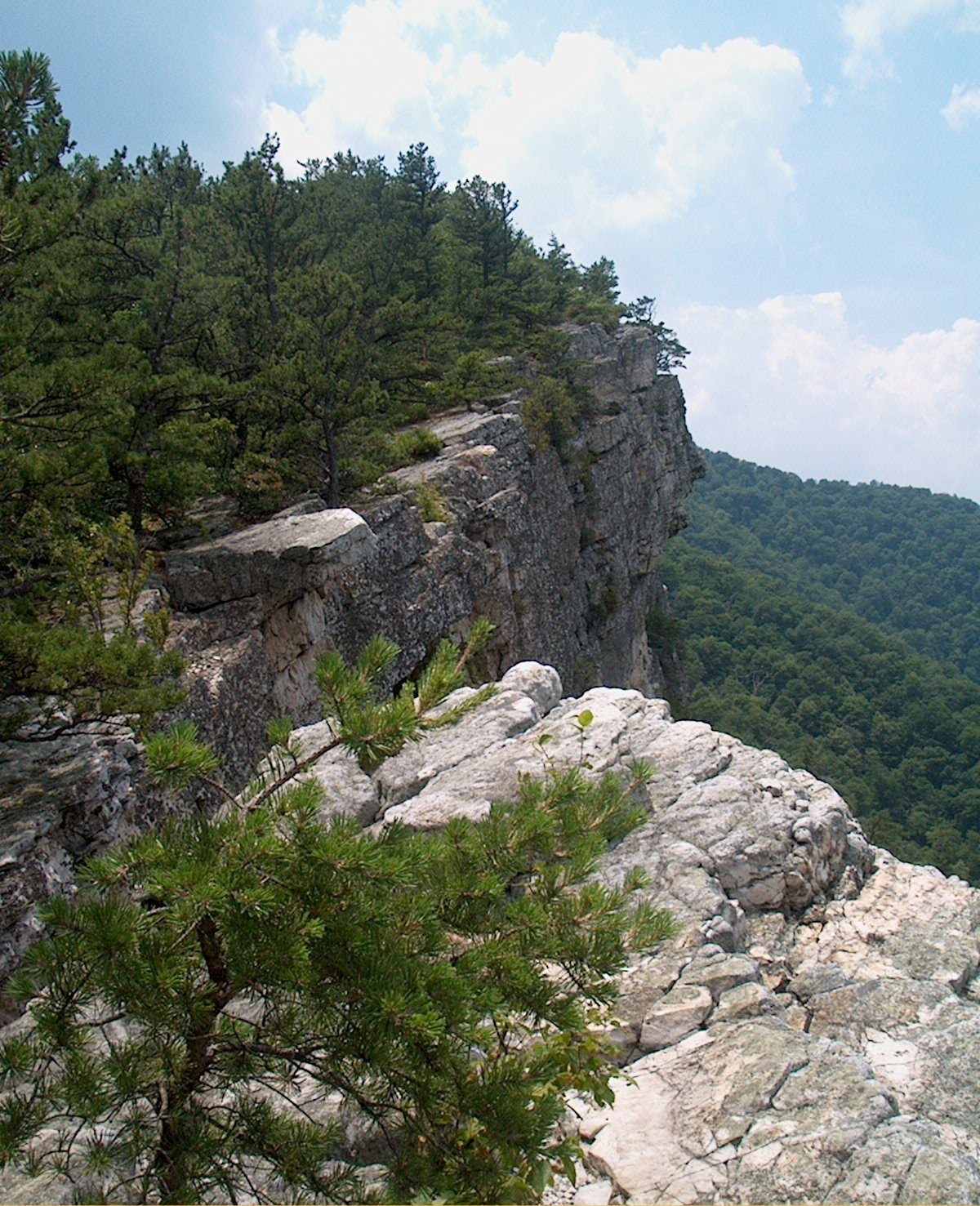
North Fork Mountain

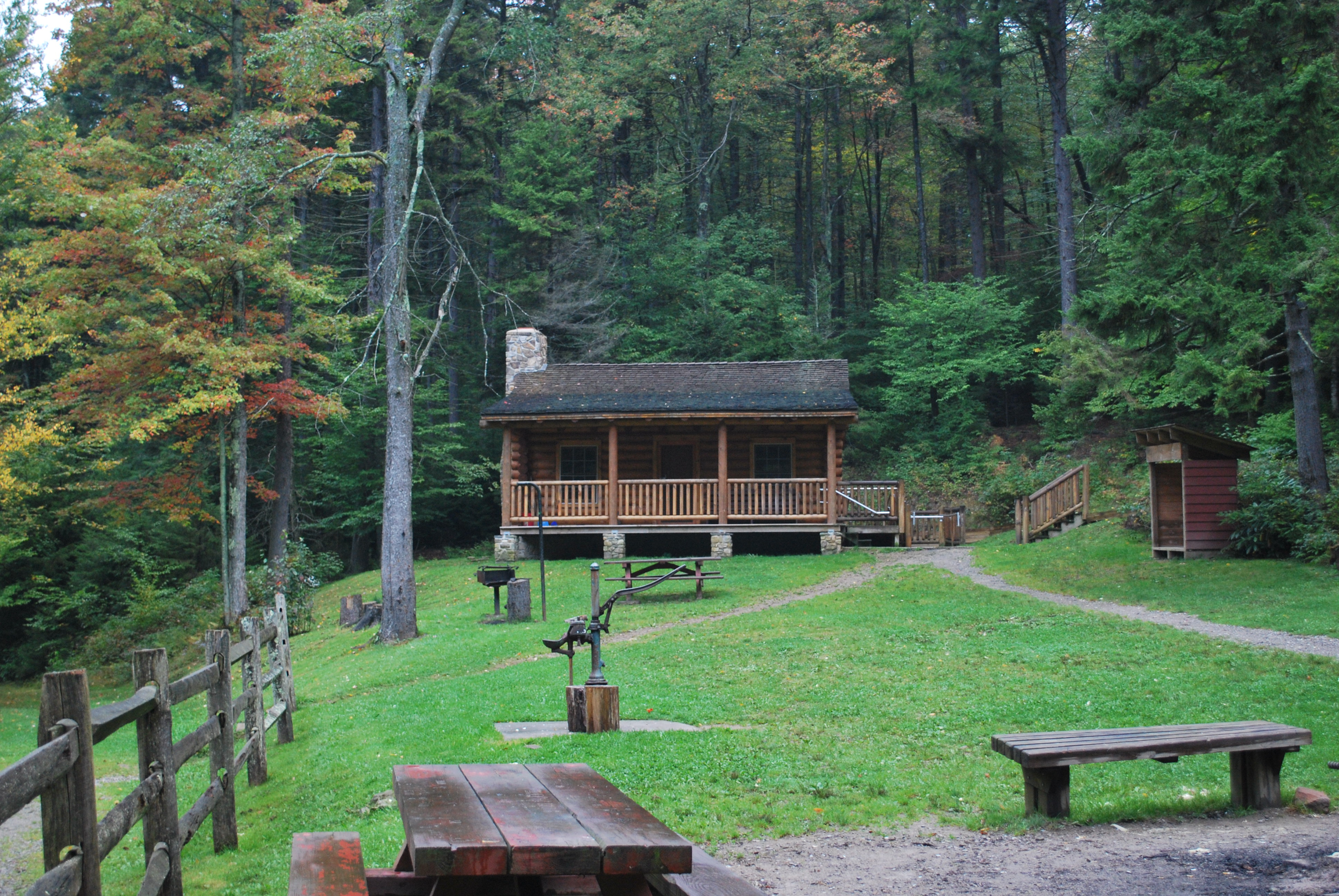
Middle Mountain Cabins

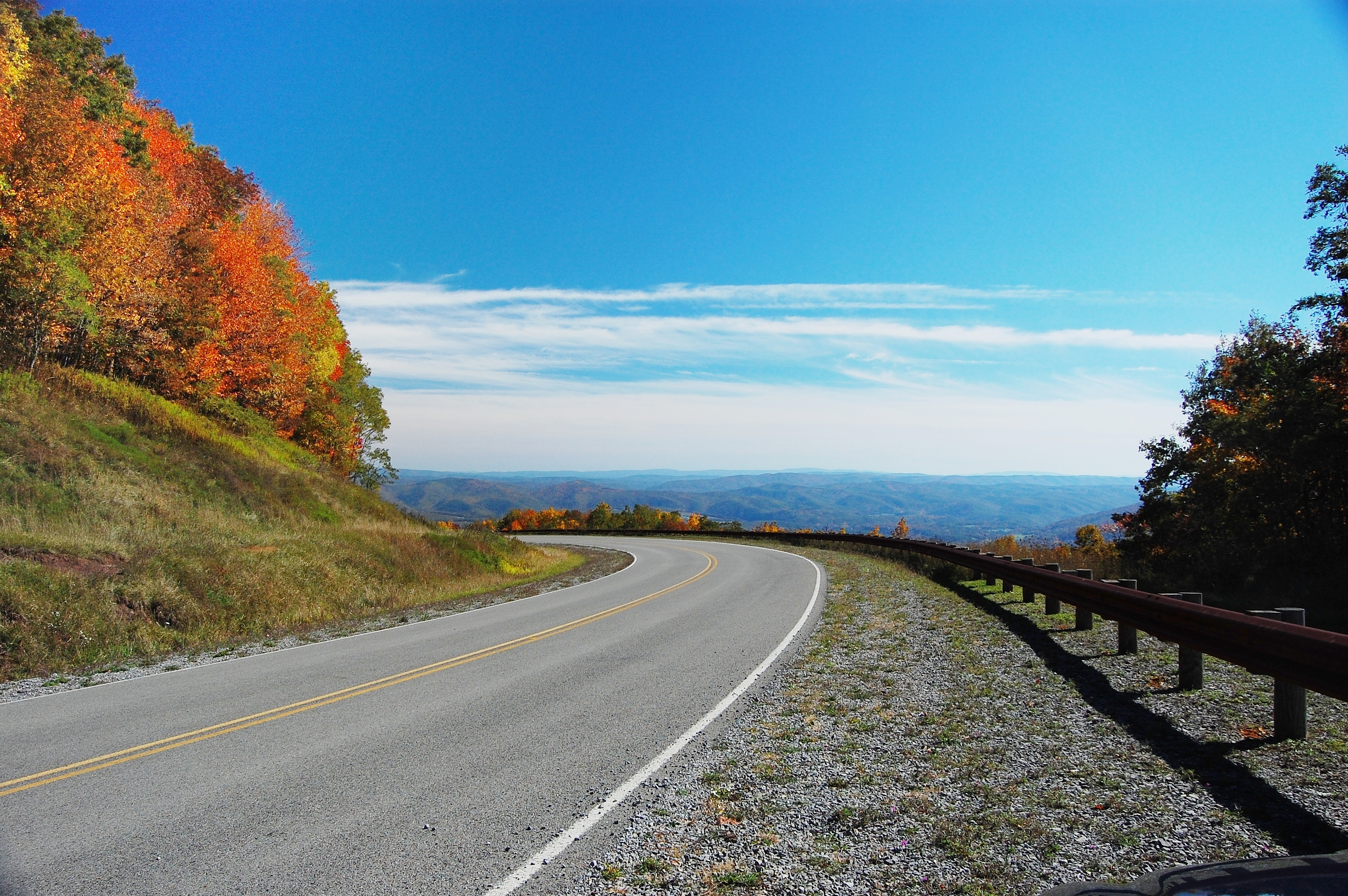
Highland Scenic Highway

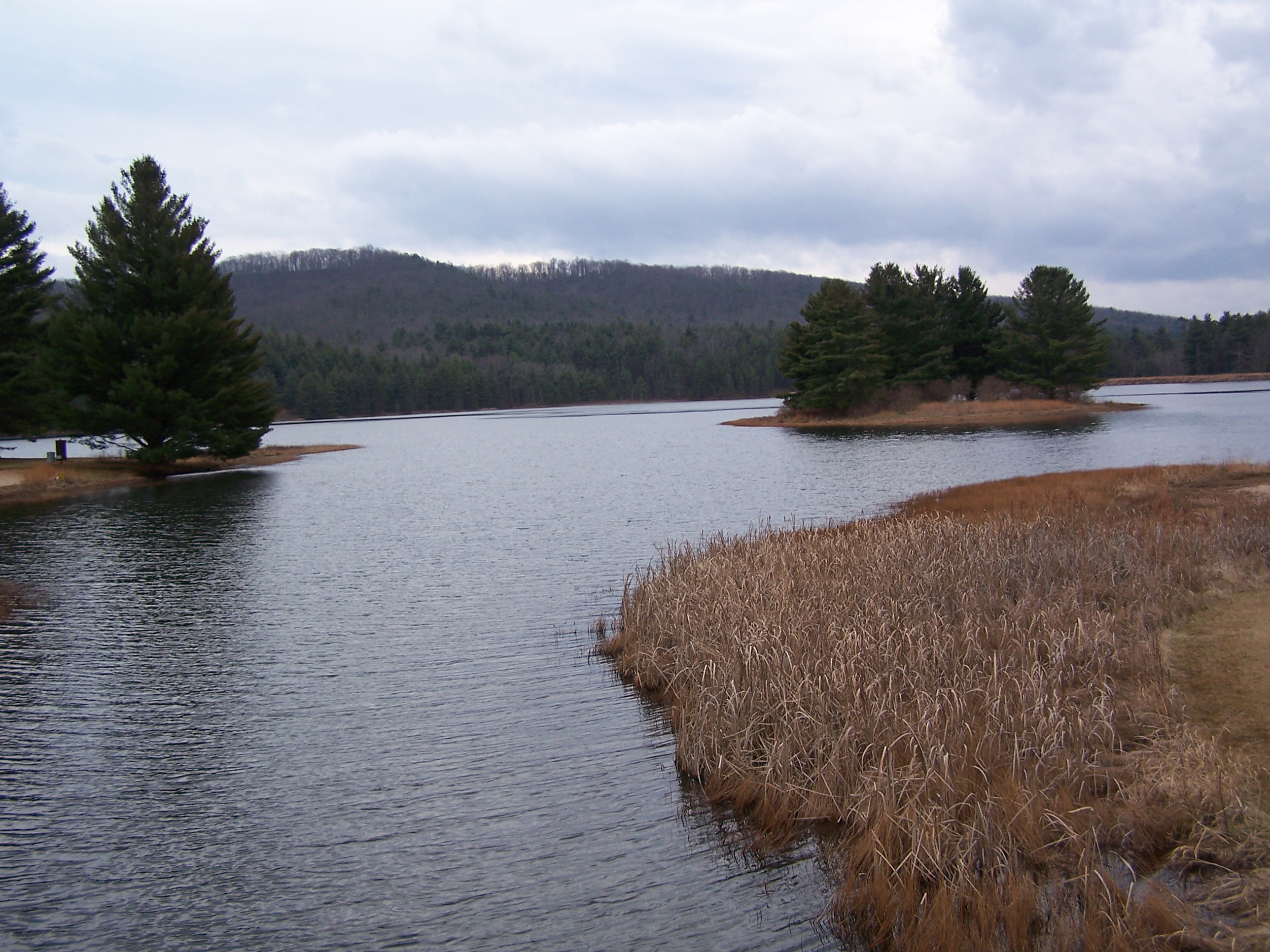
Lake Sherwood

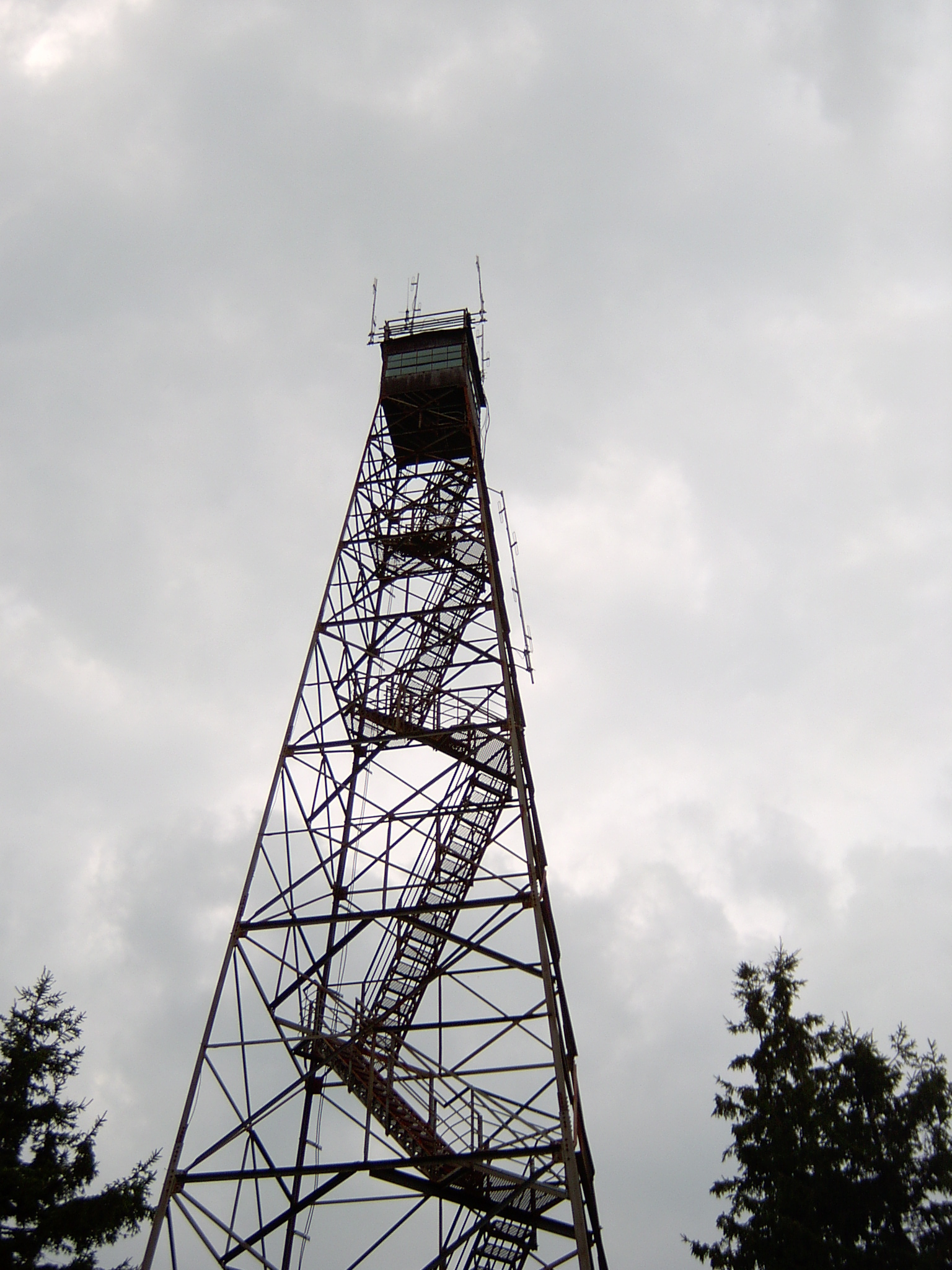
Olson Observation Tower

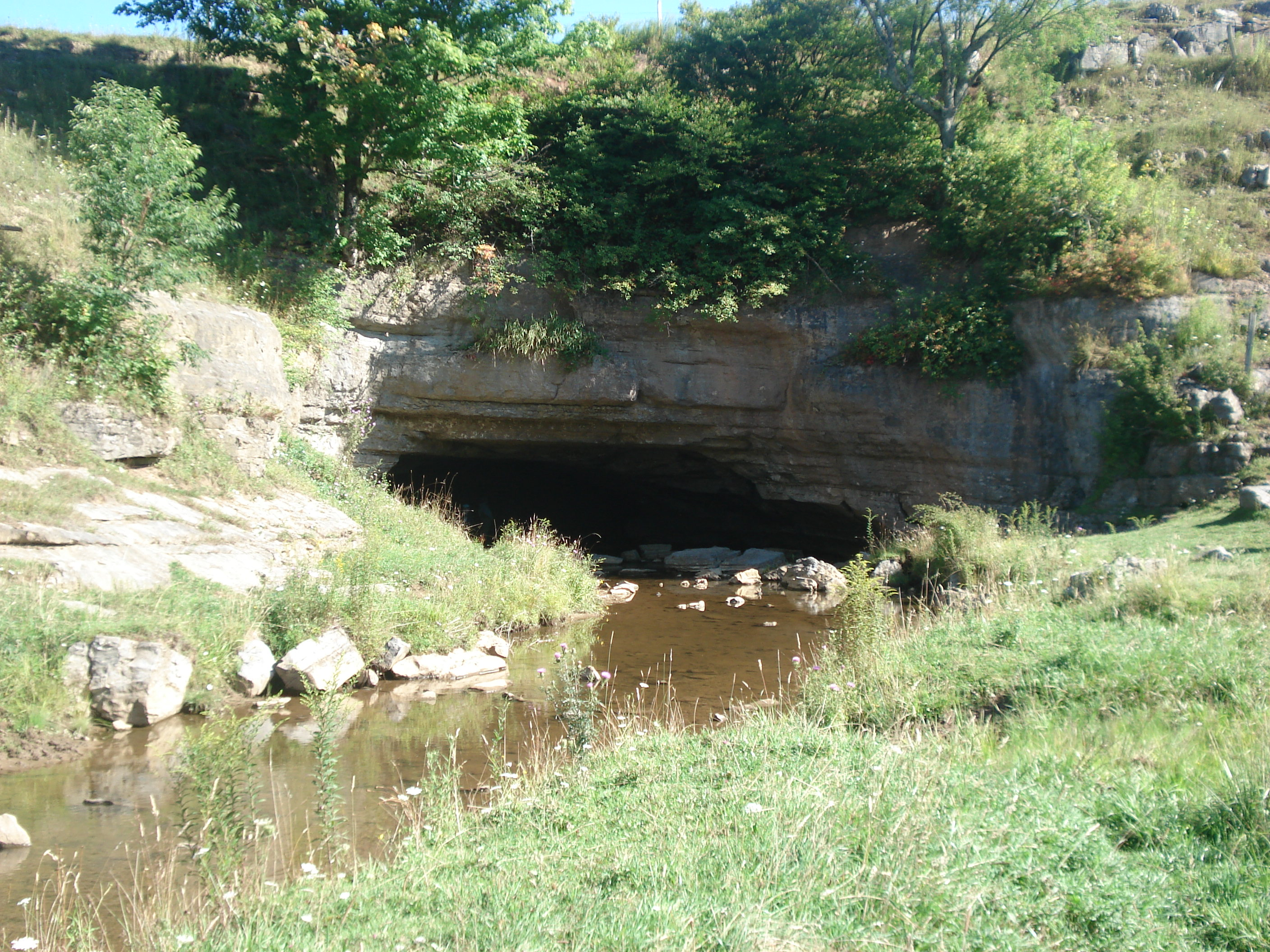
The Sinks of Gandy Creek

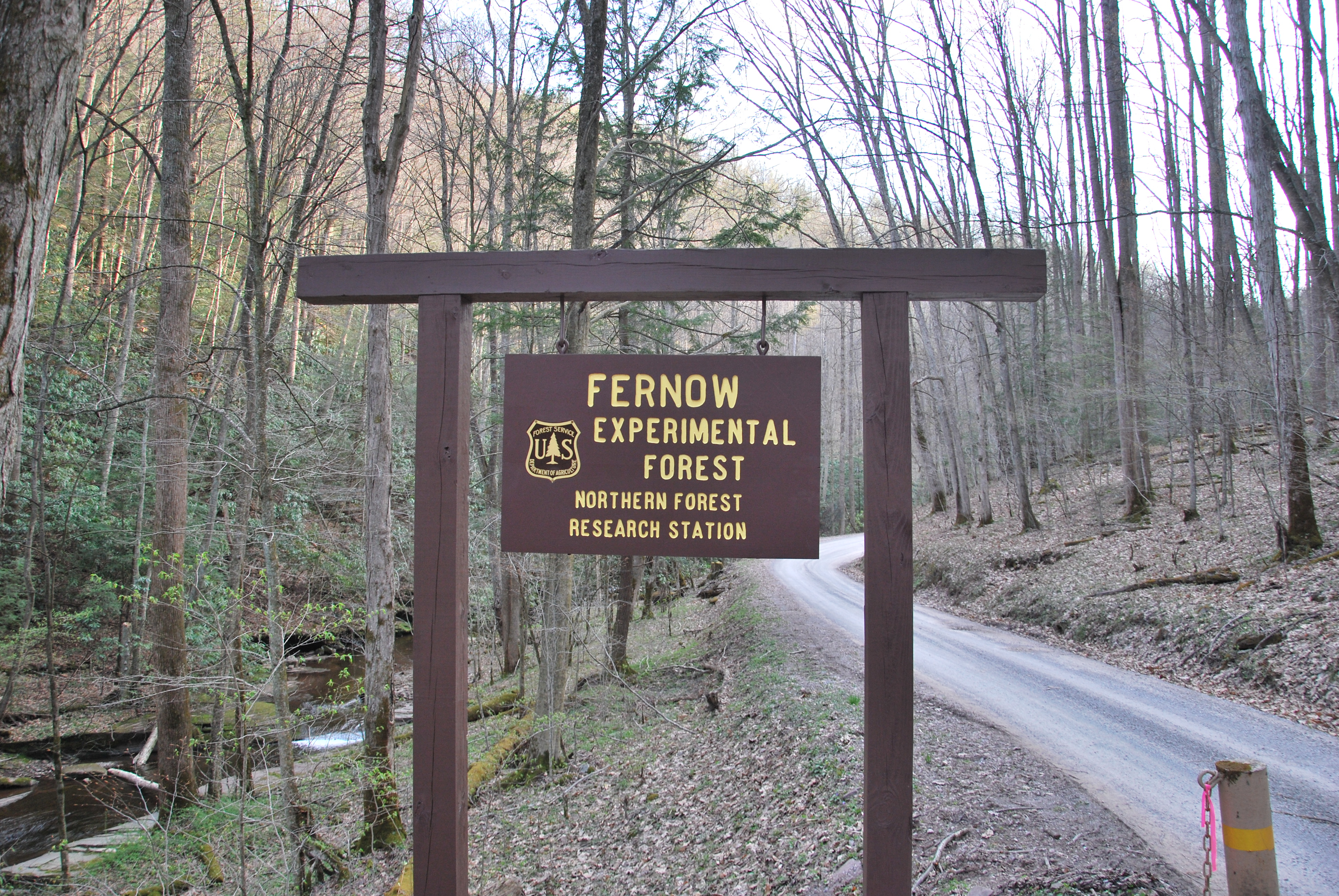
Fernow Experimental Forest

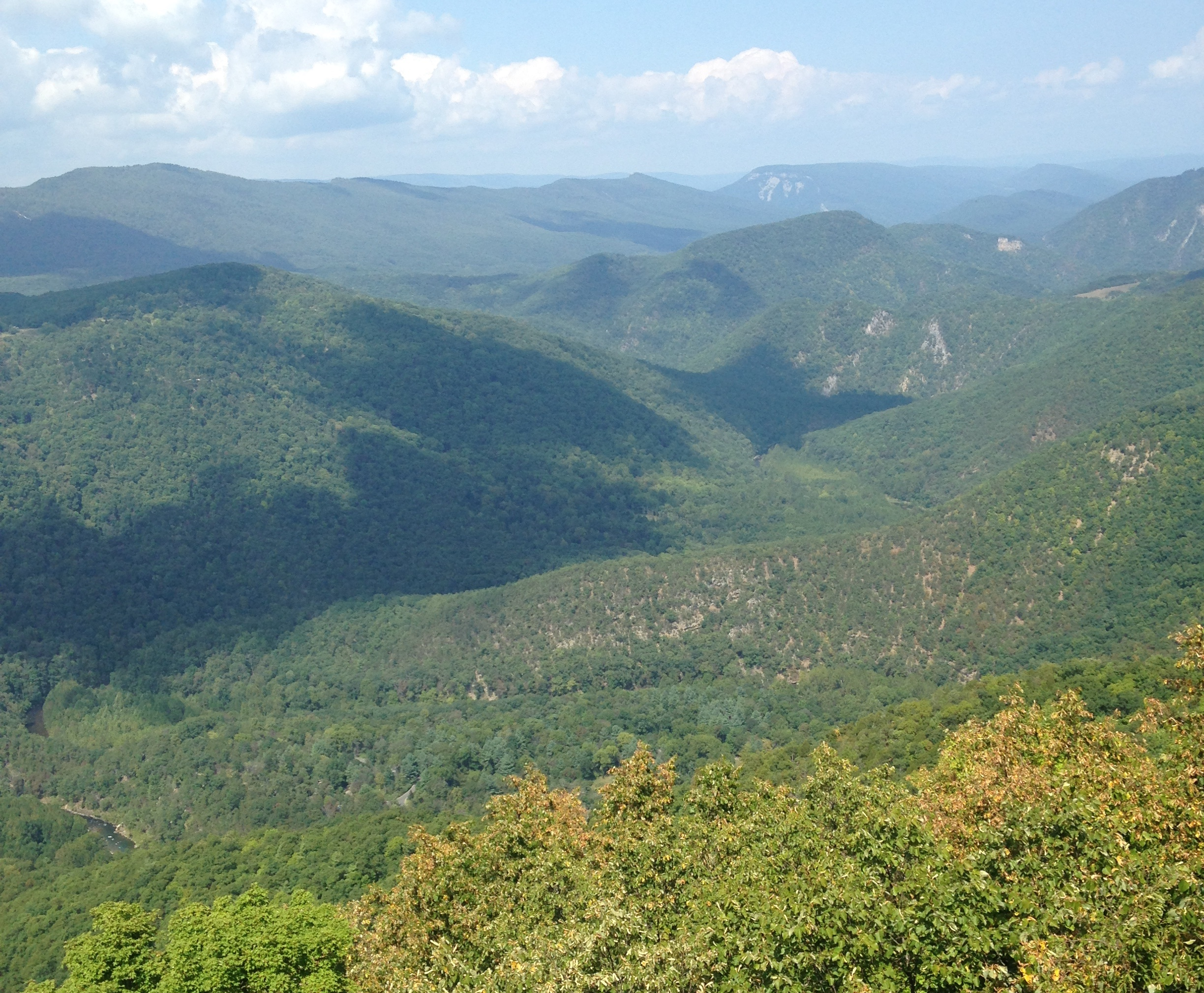
Smoke Hole Canyon from atop Cave Mountain

Fanny Bennett Hemlock Grove

== See also ==
- List of national forests of the United States
