= Shavers Fork Mountain Complex =

Mountain range in West Virginia, United States

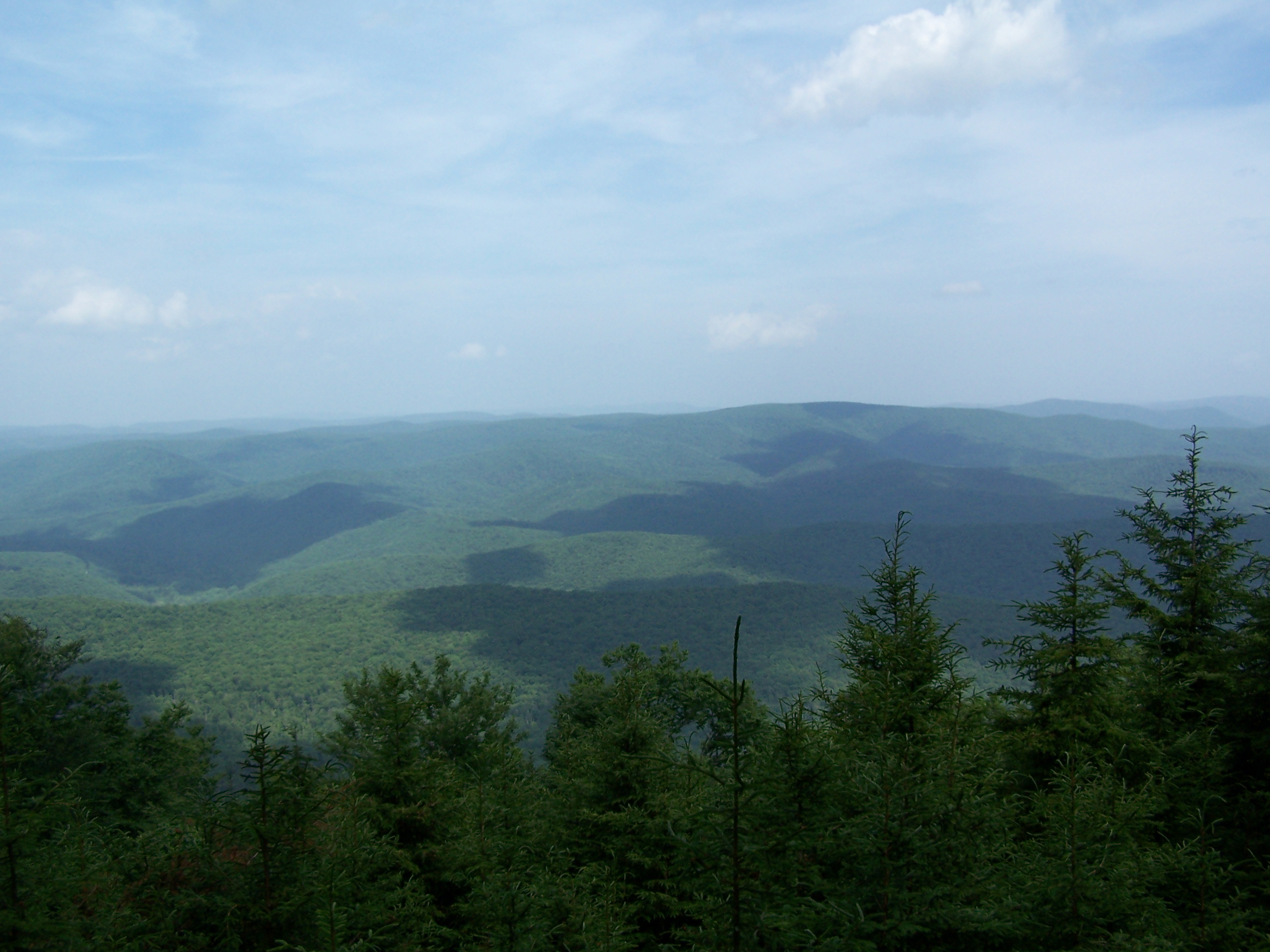
- View from Gaudineer Knob on Shavers Mountain

Highest point
- Peak: Thorny Flat, Pocahontas County, West Virginia
- Elevation: 4,848 ft (1,478 m)
- Prominence: 720 ft (220 m)
- Coordinates: 38°23′37″N 79°59′02″W

Geography
- Location within West Virginia
- Country: United States
- State: West Virginia
- Counties: Pocahontas; Randolph; Tucker
- Peaks: Cheat Mountain; Back Allegheny Mountain; Shavers Mountain
- Settlement: Durbin
- Range coordinates: 38°36′55″N 79°50′39″W

Shavers Fork Mountain Complex is the name given to the mountains on either side of Shavers Fork in the highlands portions of Randolph County, Pocahontas County, and Tucker County in West Virginia, USA. Much of the land surrounding the river and its adjacent mountains is protected by Monongahela National Forest including about 20,000 acres (81 km^{2}) of designated wilderness.

== Mountains ==
=== Cheat Mountain ===
Cheat Mountain follows the western side of Shavers Fork from Thorny Flat in Pocahontas County north to near Parsons in Tucker County. This ridge separates the Shavers Fork valley from the Tygart Valley River valley.

Its high point is at Thorny Flat. Another notable point is where the Staunton-Parkersburg Turnpike (present-day U.S. Route 250) crosses Cheat Mountain at White Top. During the American Civil War, it was home to the highest Union Army fortification of the war.

=== Shavers and Back Allegheny Mountains ===
Shavers Mountain and Back Allegheny Mountain are part of the same structural ridge that follows the eastern edge of Shavers Fork from Pocahontas County into Tucker County. North of U.S. Route 250, the ridge is known as Shavers Mountain; south, it is Back Allegheny Mountain. This ridge separates the Shavers Fork watershed, which eventually flows to the Monongahela River, from the Greenbrier River watershed, which eventually enters the Kanawha River.

One notable high point on Back Allegheny Mountain is Bald Knob, one of the highest points in the state. Just north of US 250 on Shavers Mountain is Gaudineer Knob, which provides scenic overviews of much of the Shavers Fork Mountain Complex. It is also home to the Gaudineer Scenic Area, a protected stand of spruce trees.

=== Other mountains ===
Several other neighboring mountains are frequently considered to be part of the Shavers Fork Mountain Complex.

- Bickle Knob
- McGowan Mountain
- Elk Mountain
- Middle Mountain

== History ==
Much of the Shavers Fork area was heavily timbered in the early 20th century after the Western Maryland Railway and Durbin subdivision of the Chesapeake and Ohio Railway opened, providing economic transport. By the 1930s, much of the land was completely denuded. This led to devastating floods and fires of the remaining trees. In the 1930s, reforestation of the land began in ernest through Civilian Conservation Corps projects of the Monongahela National Forest.

== Climate ==
The mountains in this area, particularly the Cheat and Back Allegheny, are notorious for their bad weather, especially in winter. Both record lows and record snowfall for the state of West Virginia have occurred here. Terrible storms and bitter cold are the norm from November to April, although it has been known to snow on the highest summits as early as mid-September and as late as June 7. Freezing temperatures and frost have occurred during every month and rime ice accumulations are common above 4,000 feet (1,200 m). As a rule of thumb, "if you don't like the weather, wait 10 minutes and it will change."

== See also ==
- Gaudineer Scenic Area, including about 50 acres (200,000 m^{2}) of virgin red spruce forest remaining on part of Shavers Mountain due to a surveying error
- Laurel Fork North Wilderness and Laurel Fork South Wilderness, wilderness areas along Middle Mountain
