= Shavers =

Shavers may refer to:

== Surname ==
- Charlie Shavers (1920–1971), American swing era jazz trumpet player
- China Shavers (born 1977), American actress
- Dinerral Shavers (born 1981), jazz drummer and educator from New Orleans, Louisiana
- Earnie Shavers (1944–2022), American former professional boxer
- Tyrell Shavers (born 1999), American football player

== Places ==
United States

- Shavers Fork, situated in the Allegheny Mountains of eastern West Virginia, USA
- Shavers Fork Mountain Complex, the mountains on either side of Shavers Fork
- Shavers Mountain, high and rugged ridge in the Allegheny Mountains of eastern West Virginia

== See also ==
- Shaver (disambiguation)
- Shivers (disambiguation)
- Savers
