= Gaudineer =

Gaudineer may refer to:

- Gaudineer Knob, mountain summit in West Virginia
- Gaudineer Scenic Area, scenic area and National Natural Landmark in West Virginia
