= Laurel Fork Wilderness =

Laurel Fork Wilderness may refer to two Wilderness areas in Monongahela National Forest:

- Laurel Fork North Wilderness
- Laurel Fork South Wilderness
