= Braucher, West Virginia =

Unincorporated community in West Virginia, United States

- Unincorporated community
- Location within West Virginia Location within the United States
- Coordinates: 38°35′55″N 79°49′14″W
- Country: United States
- State: West Virginia
- County: Pocahontas
- Elevation: 2,930 ft (890 m)
- Time zone: UTC-5 (Eastern (EST))
  - Summer (DST): UTC-4 (EDT)
- Area codes: 304 & 681
- GNIS feature ID: 1553967

Braucher is an unincorporated community in Pocahontas County, West Virginia, United States. Braucher is located on the west fork of the Greenbrier River, 3.5 miles (5.6 km) north of Durbin.
