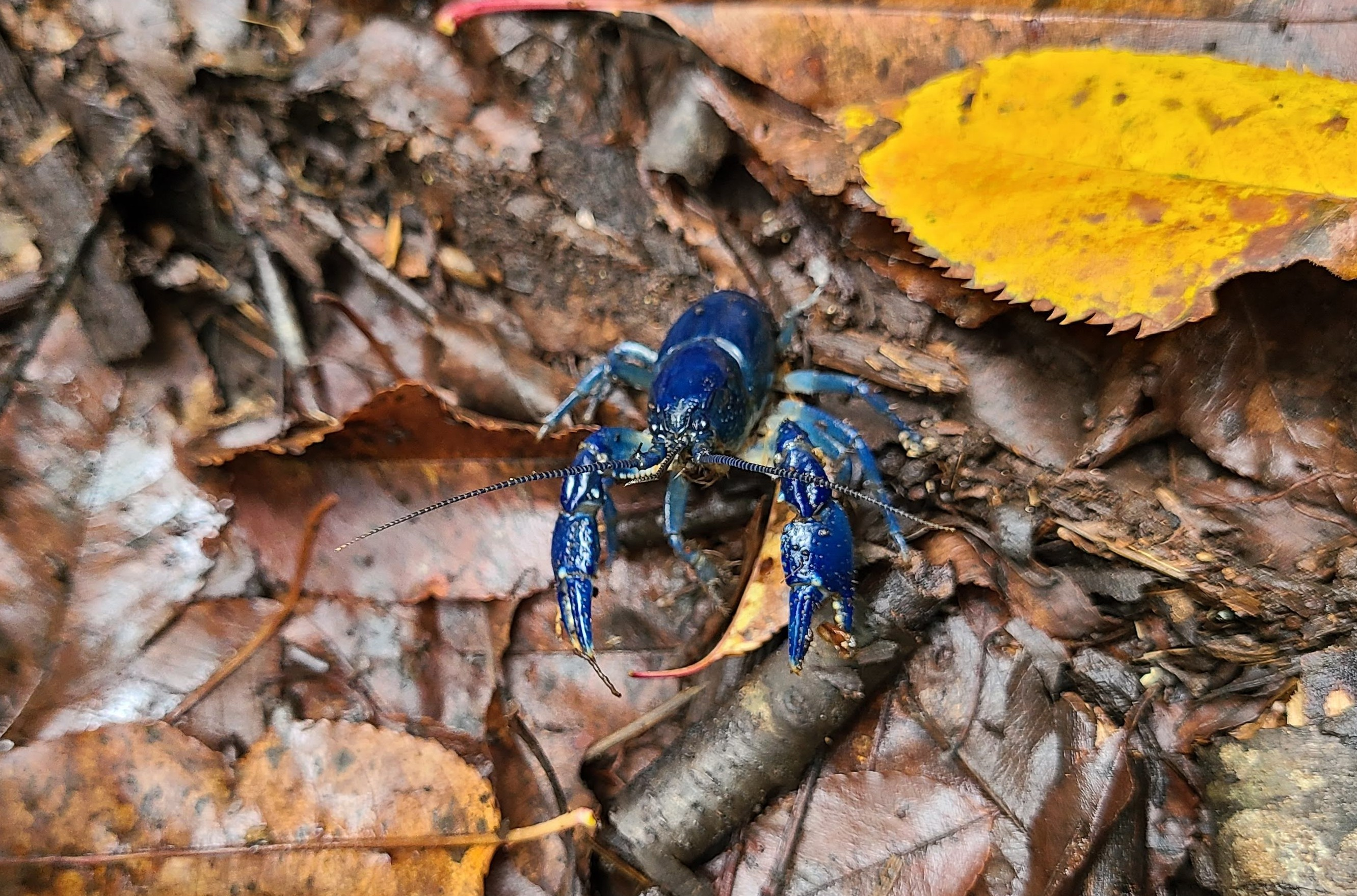
- Cambarus fetzneri found in the Dolly Sods Wilderness, West Virginia
- Vulnerable (NatureServe)

Scientific classification
- Kingdom: Animalia
- Phylum: Arthropoda
- Clade: Pancrustacea
- Class: Malacostraca
- Order: Decapoda
- Suborder: Pleocyemata
- Family: Cambaridae
- Genus: Cambarus
- Species: C. fetzneri

Binomial name
- Cambarus fetzneri Loughman, Welsh & Thoma, 2019

= Cambarus fetzneri =

Species of crayfish

Cambarus fetzneri, commonly referred to as the Allegheny Mountain mudbug, is a species of crayfish in the family Cambaridae. It was first described in 2019 from populations in the Allegheny Mountains of Virginia and West Virginia.

== Taxonomy ==
Cambarus fetzneri was described by Zachary J. Loughman, Stuart A. Welsh, and Roger F. Thoma in 2019. The species was previously considered part of Cambarus monongalensis, which was thought to exhibit a disjunct distribution across the Appalachian Plateau and the Allegheny Mountains.

Subsequent analysis demonstrated that the mountain population differed genetically and morphologically from C. monongalensis, warranting its recognition as a distinct species.

=== Etymology ===
The species is named in honor of carcinologist James Fetzner of the Carnegie Museum of Natural History, whose genetic work contributed to recognition of the species.

=== Type locality ===
The type locality is a series of roadside drainage ditches near Bemis, Randolph County, West Virginia, at approximately 38.8094°N, 79.7404°W.

== Description ==
Cambarus fetzneri can be distinguished from C. monongalensis by several morphological and coloration characteristics. The chelae of C. fetzneri lack the extensive red coloration present on the distal propodus and dactyl of C. monongalensis, and the rostral margins likewise lack red pigmentation. In contrast, C. monongalensis exhibits prominent red coloration in these areas.

Coloration in life is typically light to cobalt blue across the carapace and chelae, with white or cream accents on tubercles and ventral surfaces. Unlike C. monongalensis, red or orange coloration is largely absent except at the extreme tips of the chelae.

Adults are relatively small compared to related species, with total carapace lengths generally under 30 mm (1.2 in).

Morphologically, the rostrum of C. fetzneri is shorter and wider than that of C. monongalensis. Adult individuals are also considerably smaller in overall body size.

== Distribution and habitat ==
Cambarus fetzneri is known from the Allegheny Mountains and the Ridge-and-Valley physiographic provinces of Virginia and West Virginia, where it occurs primarily in high-elevation areas above 1,800 ft (550 m). The species has been documented from a limited number of counties within this region. It represents the mountain population formerly attributed to C. monongalensis, which also occurs in the Appalachian Plateau of northern and central West Virginia and southwestern Pennsylvania.

C. fetzneri is a montane primary burrowing crayfish that inhabits seepage wetlands, springs, and moist forested environments, including red spruce, birch, and hemlock forests. It also occurs in anthropogenic habitats such as roadside ditches and residential areas where suitable groundwater conditions exist.

Individuals construct burrows that range from simple shafts with a single chamber to complex networks with multiple tunnels and entrances. In extensive seepage habitats, multiple individuals may occupy interconnected burrow systems. The species is frequently active on the surface following rainfall and during periods of high humidity, particularly in early morning or evening hours.

== Ecology ==
Cambarus fetzneri functions as an ecosystem engineer, with its burrows providing refuge for salamanders, amphibians, and invertebrates during periods of drought or heat stress.

== Conservation ==
In Virginia, Cambarus fetzneri is listed as a Species of Greatest Conservation Need. NatureServe ranks the species as G3–G4 (vulnerable to apparently secure), reflecting a limited range but locally abundant populations in parts of West Virginia.

Identified threats include drainage of forested wetlands, groundwater withdrawal, logging and timber harvesting, and localized development. The species is also collected for the pet trade, which has led to declines in some populations.

Populations in West Virginia are partially protected within public lands such as the Monongahela National Forest, Dolly Sods Wilderness, and Canaan Valley National Wildlife Refuge.
