= Shaver =

Shaver may refer to:

- Razor
- Electric shaver

== Places in the United States ==
- Shaver, California, a former town
- Shaver Creek (Missouri), a tributary of Muddy Creek
- Shaver Creek (Pennsylvania), a tributary of the Juniata River
- Shaver Lake, in Fresno County, California

== Other uses ==
- Shaver (surname)
- Shaver Transportation Company, an American business founded in 1880
