= Syneta adamsi =

Scientific classification
- Kingdom: Animalia
- Phylum: Arthropoda
- Class: Insecta
- Order: Coleoptera
- Suborder: Polyphaga
- Infraorder: Cucujiformia
- Family: Chrysomelidae
- Genus: Syneta
- Species: S. adamsi

Binomial name
- Syneta adamsi Baly, 1877

Synonyms
- Syneta major Nakane, 1963

Species of beetle

Syneta adamsi is a species of beetles from the family of leaf beetles, subfamily Synetinae.

== Distribution ==
Syneta adamsi is found in China, Japan and Russia — in Khabarovsk Krai, Sakhalin of the Kuril Islands, Amur regions, and the Primorsky Krai.

== Description ==
At length the beetle reaches 7.4 mm. The epipleuron is flat, with a number of points at the inner edge. The elytra of females have a long lateral keel. The top of the aedeagus has a short process.
