= Burner, West Virginia =

Unincorporated community in West Virginia, United States

- Unincorporated community
- Location within West Virginia Location within the United States
- Coordinates: 38°37′01″N 79°48′25″W
- Country: United States
- State: West Virginia
- County: Pocahontas
- Elevation: 2,917 ft (889 m)
- Time zone: UTC-5 (Eastern (EST))
  - Summer (DST): UTC-4 (EDT)
- Area codes: 304 & 681
- GNIS feature ID: 1554032

Burner is an unincorporated community in Pocahontas County, West Virginia, United States. Burner is located on the west fork of the Greenbrier River, 5 miles (8.0 km) north of Durbin and was established by the Pocahontas Lumber Company in 1903.
