= Wildell, West Virginia =

Wildell
- Unincorporated community
- Location within West Virginia Location within the United States
- Coordinates: 38°42′40″N 79°46′50″W
- Country: USA
- State: West Virginia
- County: Pocahontas
- Elevation: 3,061 ft (933 m)
- Time zone: UTC-5 (Eastern (EST))
  - Summer (DST): UTC-4 (EDT)
- Area codes: 304 & 681
- GNIS feature ID: 1553454

Wildell is an unincorporated community in Pocahontas County, West Virginia, United States. Wildell is 11.5 miles (18.5 km) north-northeast of Durbin.

The community took its name from Willdell Lumber Company, which operated in the area.
