= Hosterman, West Virginia =

- Unincorporated community
- Location within West Virginia Location within the United States
- Coordinates: 38°28′23″N 79°51′23″W
- Country: United States
- State: West Virginia
- County: Pocahontas
- Elevation: 2,612 ft (796 m)
- Time zone: UTC-5 (Eastern (EST))
  - Summer (DST): UTC-4 (EDT)
- Area codes: 304 & 681
- GNIS feature ID: 1554747

Hosterman is an unincorporated community in Pocahontas County, West Virginia, United States. Hosterman is located on the Greenbrier River, 5.5 miles (8.9 km) south-southwest of Durbin. The community was originally named Collins; its name was changed to Hosterman in 1902. The community presently has the name of Theodore G. Hosterman, a worker in the local lumber industry.
