= Shaver Creek =

Shaver Creek may refer to:

- Shaver Creek (Missouri)
- Shaver Creek (Pennsylvania)
