= Syneta extorris =

Scientific classification
- Domain: Eukaryota
- Kingdom: Animalia
- Phylum: Arthropoda
- Class: Insecta
- Order: Coleoptera
- Suborder: Polyphaga
- Infraorder: Cucujiformia
- Family: Chrysomelidae
- Genus: Syneta
- Species: S. extorris

Binomial name
- Syneta extorris Brown, 1940

Subspecies
- Syneta extorris borealis Brown, 1961; Syneta extorris extorris Brown, 1940

Species of beetle

Syneta extorris is a species of leaf beetle. It is found in eastern North America.

== Subspecies ==
These two subspecies belong to the species Syneta extorris:

- Syneta extorris borealis Brown, 1961^{i c g} – pale males, occurs from Newfoundland to Ontario and New York, feeds on balsam fir (Abies balsamea) and on white and red spruce (Picea glauca and Picea rubens).
- Syneta extorris extorris Brown, 1940^{i c g} – dark males, restricted to higher elevations in the southern Appalachian Mountains, feeds on southern fir (Abies fraseri) and red spruce (Picea rubens).

Data sources: i = ITIS, c = Catalogue of Life, g = GBIF, b = Bugguide.net
