= Thricolema =

Scientific classification
- Domain: Eukaryota
- Kingdom: Animalia
- Phylum: Arthropoda
- Class: Insecta
- Order: Coleoptera
- Suborder: Polyphaga
- Infraorder: Cucujiformia
- Family: Chrysomelidae
- Subfamily: Synetinae
- Genus: Thricolema; Crotch, 1874
- Species: T. anomala

Binomial name
- Thricolema anomala Crotch, 1874

Genus of beetles

Thricolema is a genus of leaf beetles in the subfamily Synetinae. It contains only one species, Thricolema anomala, known from California and Oregon in the United States. Thricolema resembles Syneta, except that the adult females of Thricolema have simple tarsal claws, whereas adults of both sexes of Syneta have bifid claws. The body of an adult is elongated and fibrous. Adults are associated with Calocedrus decurrens.
