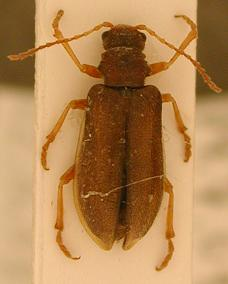

Scientific classification
- Domain: Eukaryota
- Kingdom: Animalia
- Phylum: Arthropoda
- Class: Insecta
- Order: Coleoptera
- Suborder: Polyphaga
- Infraorder: Cucujiformia
- Family: Chrysomelidae
- Genus: Syneta
- Species: S. betulae

Binomial name
- Syneta betulae (Fabricius, 1792)

Synonyms
- Crioceris betulae Fabricius, 1792; Crioceris betulina Thunberg, 1787 (nomen oblitum)

= Syneta betulae =

Species of beetle

Syneta betulae is a species of beetle from the family of leaf beetles, subfamily Synetinae.

== Subspecies ==
There are two subspecies of S. betulae:

- Syneta betulae amurensis Pic, 1901
- Syneta betulae betulae (Fabricius, 1792)

== Distribution ==
Syneta betulae is distributed in the Fennoscandia and Siberia, as well as in Japan and China.

== Description ==
The beetle is 5.4–7.5 millimetres (0.21–0.30 in) long. The body is elongated, pubescent, and brown. The legs and antenna are red coloured. The males are darker than the females, often completely dark brown. The pronotum is narrower than the elytra and is laterally marginal, with 3-4 sharp teeth and thickened anterior angles.

== Environment ==
Syneta betulae feeds on various deciduous trees, mainly birch leaves. The larva feeds on roots in soil.
