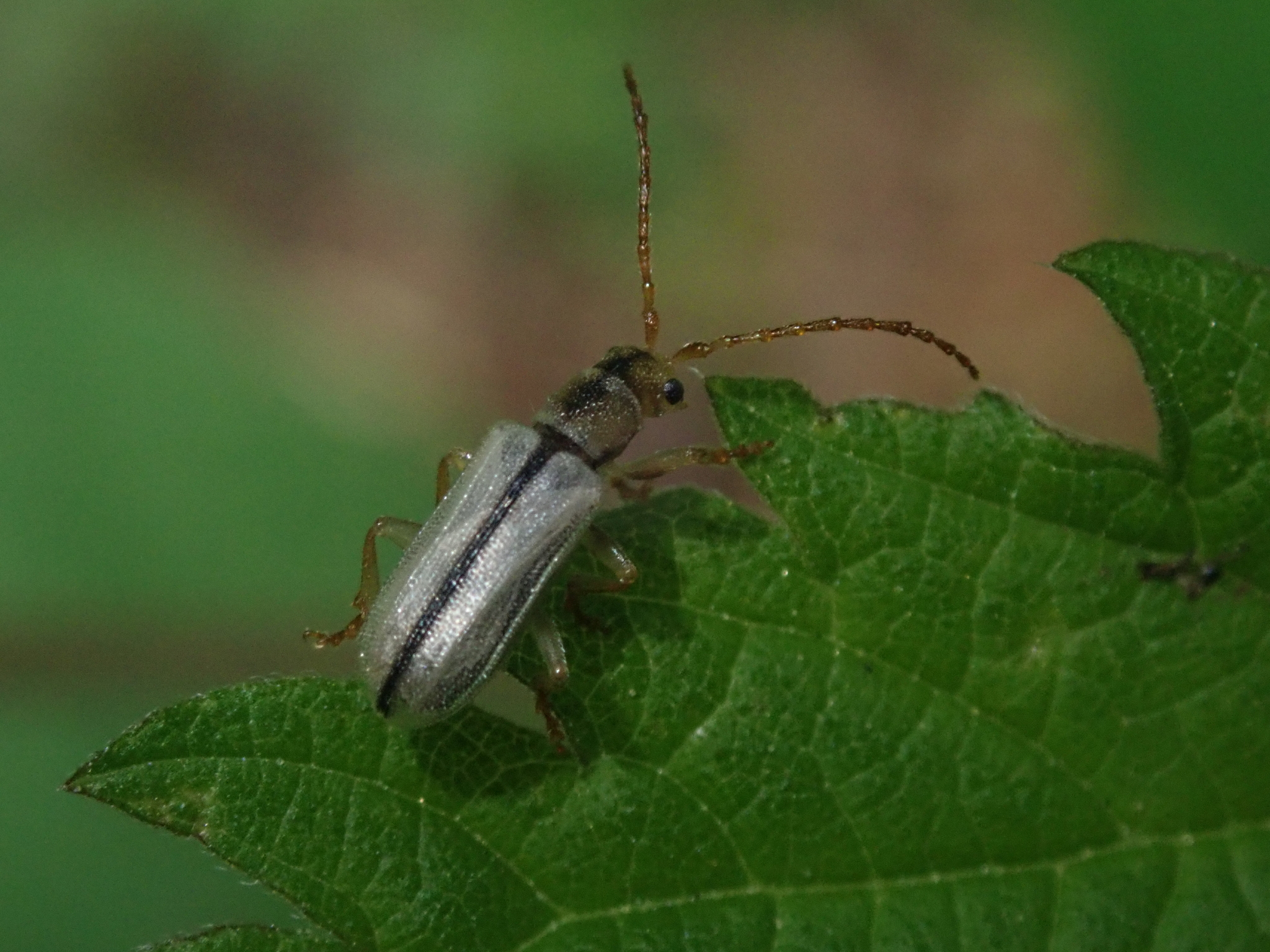

Scientific classification
- Domain: Eukaryota
- Kingdom: Animalia
- Phylum: Arthropoda
- Class: Insecta
- Order: Coleoptera
- Suborder: Polyphaga
- Infraorder: Cucujiformia
- Family: Chrysomelidae
- Genus: Syneta
- Species: S. albida

Binomial name
- Syneta albida LeConte, 1857

Synonyms
- Syneta suturalis LeConte, 1859

= Syneta albida =

Species of beetle

Syneta albida, the western fruit beetle, is a species of beetles from the family of leaf beetles, subfamily Synetinae.

== Distribution ==
The species is found in western North America.

== Description ==
The length of the adult beetles, on average, is 6 mm.

== Environment ==
Syneta albida feeds on the leaves of various deciduous trees: Quince (Cydonia), plum (Prunus), pear (Pyrus) and currant (Ribes).

The larvae eat tree roots, hibernate in the soil, and pupate in the spring.
