= Laurel Fork (Cheat River tributary) =

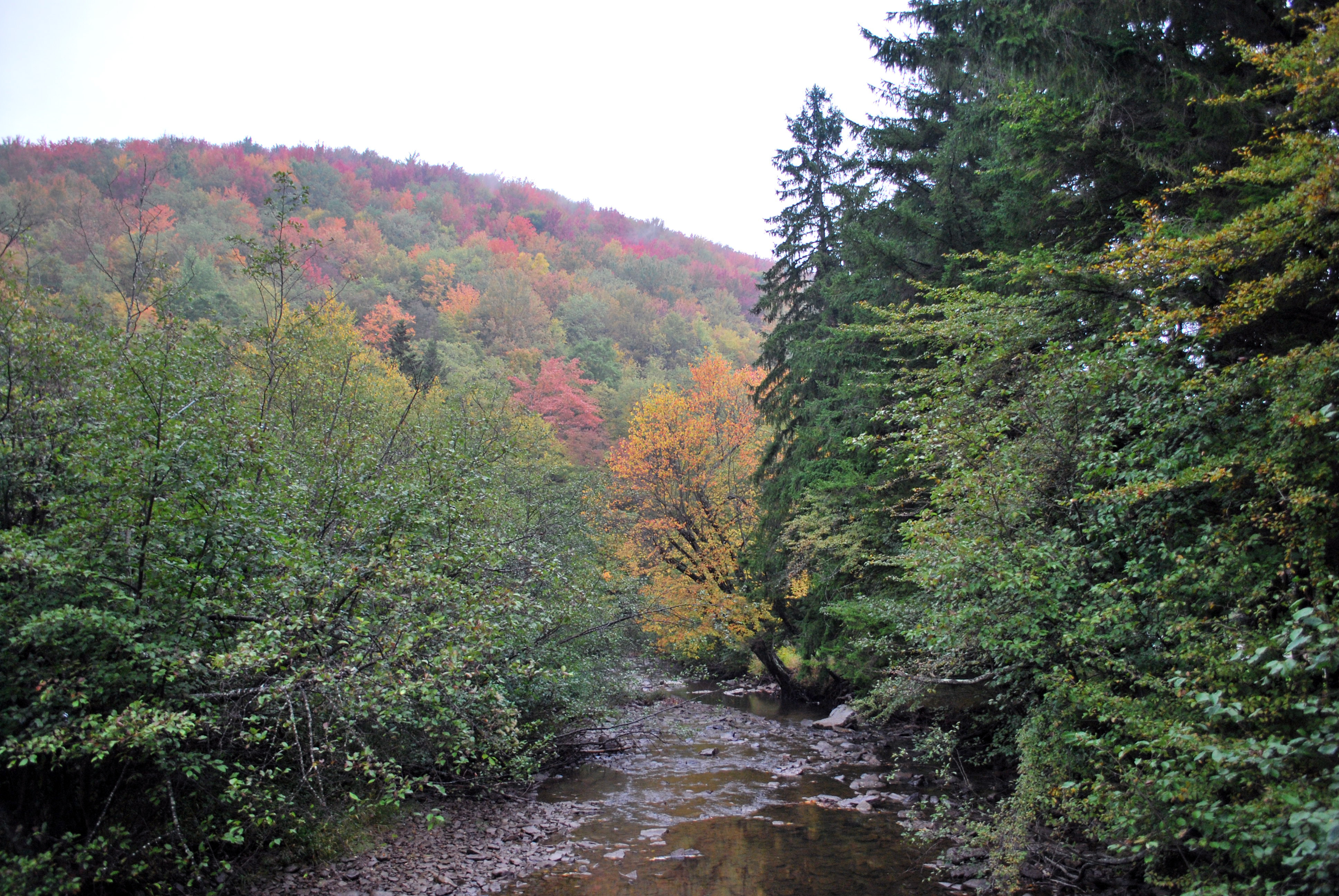
- Laurel Fork at Laurel Fork Recreation Area

Location
- Country: United States
- State: West Virginia
- County: Randolph

Physical characteristics
- Source
  - coordinates: 38°39′55″N 79°40′52″W
- Mouth: Dry Fork
  - location: Randolph County, northwest of Harman
  - coordinates: 38°58′57″N 79°32′43″W
  - elevation: 2,047 ft (624 m)
- Length: 38 mi (61 km)
- Basin size: 60 mi^{2} (160 km^{2})

Laurel Fork is a 37.8-mile-long (60.8 km) river in eastern West Virginia, USA. It is a tributary of the Dry Fork; via the Dry Fork, the Black Fork, and the Cheat, Monongahela and Ohio rivers, it is part of the watershed of the Mississippi River, draining an area of 60 square miles (160 km^{2}) in the Allegheny Mountains. With the Dry Fork, the Glady Fork, the Shavers Fork and the Blackwater River, it is considered to be one of the five principal headwaters tributaries of the Cheat River.

== Geography ==
The Laurel Fork flows for its entire length in eastern Randolph County. It rises on a divide on the Randolph-Pocahontas county border separating the watershed of the Cheat River from that of the Greenbrier, and flows north-northeastwardly in a meandering course between Middle Mountain and Rich Mountain, through the Monongahela National Forest, to its mouth at the Dry Fork just south of the Tucker County border, approximately four miles (6.4 km) northwest of Harman. The lowermost seven miles (11 km) of the river are characterized by continuous Class 3 rapids.

Two adjacent wilderness areas of the Monongahela National Forest (separated only by a road), the north and south units of the Laurel Fork Wilderness, are located along the river. These areas of the watershed were logged of all virgin timber by 1921, by a company known as the Laurel River Lumber Company, which also constructed a railroad along the river. According to the West Virginia Department of Environmental Protection, nearly 87% of the Laurel Fork watershed is forested, primarily deciduous.

== See also ==
- List of West Virginia rivers
