= Syneta carinata =

Scientific classification
- Domain: Eukaryota
- Kingdom: Animalia
- Phylum: Arthropoda
- Class: Insecta
- Order: Coleoptera
- Suborder: Polyphaga
- Infraorder: Cucujiformia
- Family: Chrysomelidae
- Genus: Syneta
- Species: S. carinata

Binomial name
- Syneta carinata Mannerheim, 1843

Synonyms
- Syneta carinata Dejean, 1835 (nomen nudum)

Species of beetle

Syneta carinata is a species of leaf beetle. It is found in northwestern North America. The specific name was first used by Johann Friedrich von Eschscholtz in his collection before 1831, but was never published by him. Instead, the name is attributed to Carl Gustaf Mannerheim, who published a description of the species in 1843.
