= Syneta hamata =

Scientific classification
- Domain: Eukaryota
- Kingdom: Animalia
- Phylum: Arthropoda
- Class: Insecta
- Order: Coleoptera
- Suborder: Polyphaga
- Infraorder: Cucujiformia
- Family: Chrysomelidae
- Genus: Syneta
- Species: S. hamata

Binomial name
- Syneta hamata Horn, 1893

Species of beetle

Syneta hamata is a species of leaf beetle. It is found in western North America.
