= Shavers Mountain =

Mountain ridge in West Virginia, United States

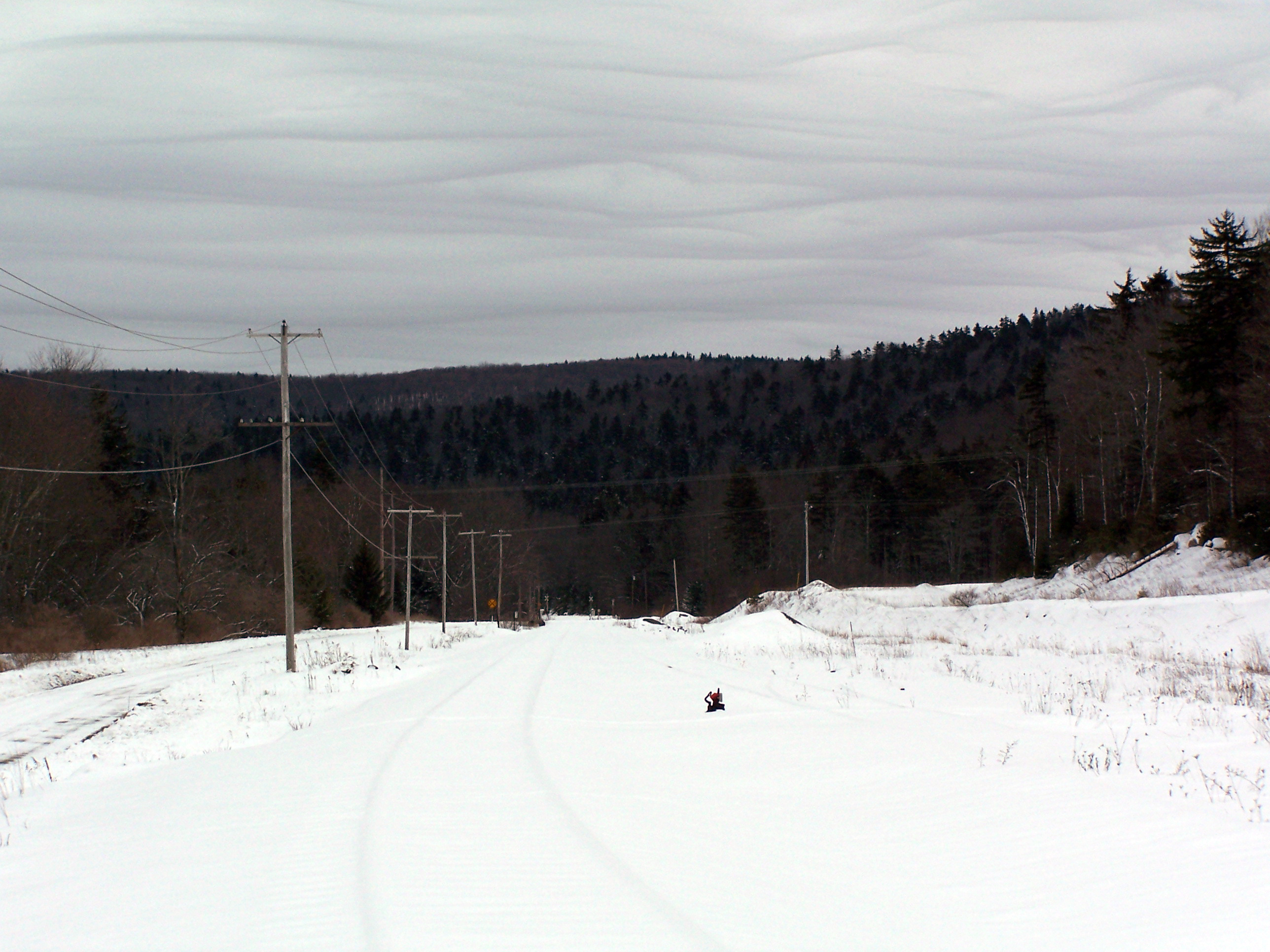
- Shavers Mountain (in distance) at Cheat Bridge, West Virginia

Highest point
- Peak: Gaudineer Knob, Pocahontas and Randolph Counties, West Virginia
- Elevation: 4,432 ft (1,351 m)
- Coordinates: 38°36′55″N 79°50′39″W

Dimensions
- Length: 35 mi (56 km)approximately

Geography
- Location within West Virginia
- Country: United States
- State: West Virginia
- Counties: Pocahontas, Randolph and Tucker
- Range coordinates: 38°54′22″N 79°40′21″W
- Parent range: Allegheny Mountains
- Topo maps: USGS: Durbin; Glady; Wildell; Beverly East; Bowden; Harman; Mozark Mountain

Shavers Mountain, is a high and rugged ridge situated in the Allegheny Mountains of eastern West Virginia. It is about 35 miles (56 km) long, north to south, and several of its peaks exceed 4,000 feet (1,200 m) in elevation. Shavers Mountain is notable for being "bookended", at its northern and southern ends, by two exceptional natural areas: the Otter Creek Wilderness and the Gaudineer Scenic Area, respectively, both of which preserve small stands of old-growth forest on the mountain.

== Geography ==
Most of Shavers Mountain lies within eastern Randolph County, although along its southern third, its crest forms the boundary between Randolph and Pocahontas Counties. Shavers Mountain is defined to the west by the valley of Shavers Fork and to the east by the valley of Glady Fork, West Fork of Glady Fork and the West Fork Greenbrier River.

Shavers Mountain is part of the Shavers Fork Mountain Complex, which includes Cheat Mountain to the west and Middle Mountain to the east. Shavers Mountain's northern end is in a bend of Dry Fork of Cheat River near the town of Gladwin. Its southern end is at U.S. Route 250, south of which the same structural fold continues as Back Allegheny Mountain. The highest point of Shavers Mountain is located just north of US 250 at Gaudineer Knob, which has an elevation of 4,432 feet (1,351 m).

== History ==
According to E.C. Wyatt, a local historian who published in The Randolph Enterprise newspaper in the 1920s, the mountain was named for Peter Shaver, an early settler to the area who was killed by Indians. Wyatt believed that in 1848 his grandfather, Ellis Wyatt, became the first man to build a house on Shavers Mountain. Ellis was a farmer, merchant, civil engineer, surveyor, constable, deputy sheriff, and a miller. He was apparently the first and only man to vote a Democratic ticket in the Dry Fork District in the first election held after the Civil War. Indeed, no Democratic ticket had been printed in the District, so one had to be written to accommodate him. In June 1879, Ellis Wyatt became the first postmaster of the town of Alpena, holding the position until 1897.

The timber industry in West Virginia grew rapidly towards the end of the 19th century. In the early 1900s, Shavers Mountain was almost completely denuded of trees. For the most part, native trees have been allowed to grow back naturally, with only some non-native Norway spruce planted on top of the mountain in the 1920s.

== Preservation and recreation ==
Most of Shavers Mountain lies within the Monongahela National Forest. The Shavers Mountain Spruce-Hemlock Stand is a 68-acre (28 ha) virgin red spruce-hemlock stand, partly within the Otter Creek Wilderness. (The Otter Creek Wilderness lies in a bowl formed by Shavers Mountain and McGowan Mountain.) The Gaudineer Scenic Area, encompassing 140 acres (57 ha) around Gaudineer Knob, includes about 50 acres (20 ha) of virgin red spruce forest.

The Shavers Mountain Trail, somewhat strenuous but affording exceptional views, is 10 miles (16 km) long.
