= Syneta seriata =

Scientific classification
- Domain: Eukaryota
- Kingdom: Animalia
- Phylum: Arthropoda
- Class: Insecta
- Order: Coleoptera
- Suborder: Polyphaga
- Infraorder: Cucujiformia
- Family: Chrysomelidae
- Genus: Syneta
- Species: S. seriata

Binomial name
- Syneta seriata LeConte, 1859

Synonyms
- Syneta simplex var. minuta Brisley, 1927

Species of beetle

Syneta seriata is a species of leaf beetle. It is found in North America. It feeds on California live oak (Quercus agrifolia) and California black oak (Quercus californica).
