= Syneta ferruginea =

Scientific classification
- Domain: Eukaryota
- Kingdom: Animalia
- Phylum: Arthropoda
- Class: Insecta
- Order: Coleoptera
- Suborder: Polyphaga
- Infraorder: Cucujiformia
- Family: Chrysomelidae
- Genus: Syneta
- Species: S. ferruginea

Binomial name
- Syneta ferruginea (Germar, 1811)

Synonyms
- Donacia ferruginea Germar, 1811; Orsodacne tripla Say, 1826; Orsodachna costata Newman, 1838; Syneta rubicunda Lacordaire, 1845

Species of beetle

Syneta ferruginea, the rusty leaf beetle, is a species of leaf beetle. It is found in eastern North America.
