= Syneta simplex =

Scientific classification
- Domain: Eukaryota
- Kingdom: Animalia
- Phylum: Arthropoda
- Class: Insecta
- Order: Coleoptera
- Suborder: Polyphaga
- Infraorder: Cucujiformia
- Family: Chrysomelidae
- Genus: Syneta
- Species: S. simplex

Binomial name
- Syneta simplex LeConte, 1857

Subspecies
- Syneta simplex simplex LeConte, 1857; Syneta simplex subalpina Edwards, 1953

Species of beetle

Syneta simplex is a species of leaf beetle found in North America. The species includes the two subspecies Syneta simplex simplex, which lives at elevations considerably below timberline and feeds on Garry oak (Quercus garryana), and Syneta simplex subalpina, which is found near timberline in Washington and British Columbia and feeds on alpine fir (Abies lasiocarpa).
