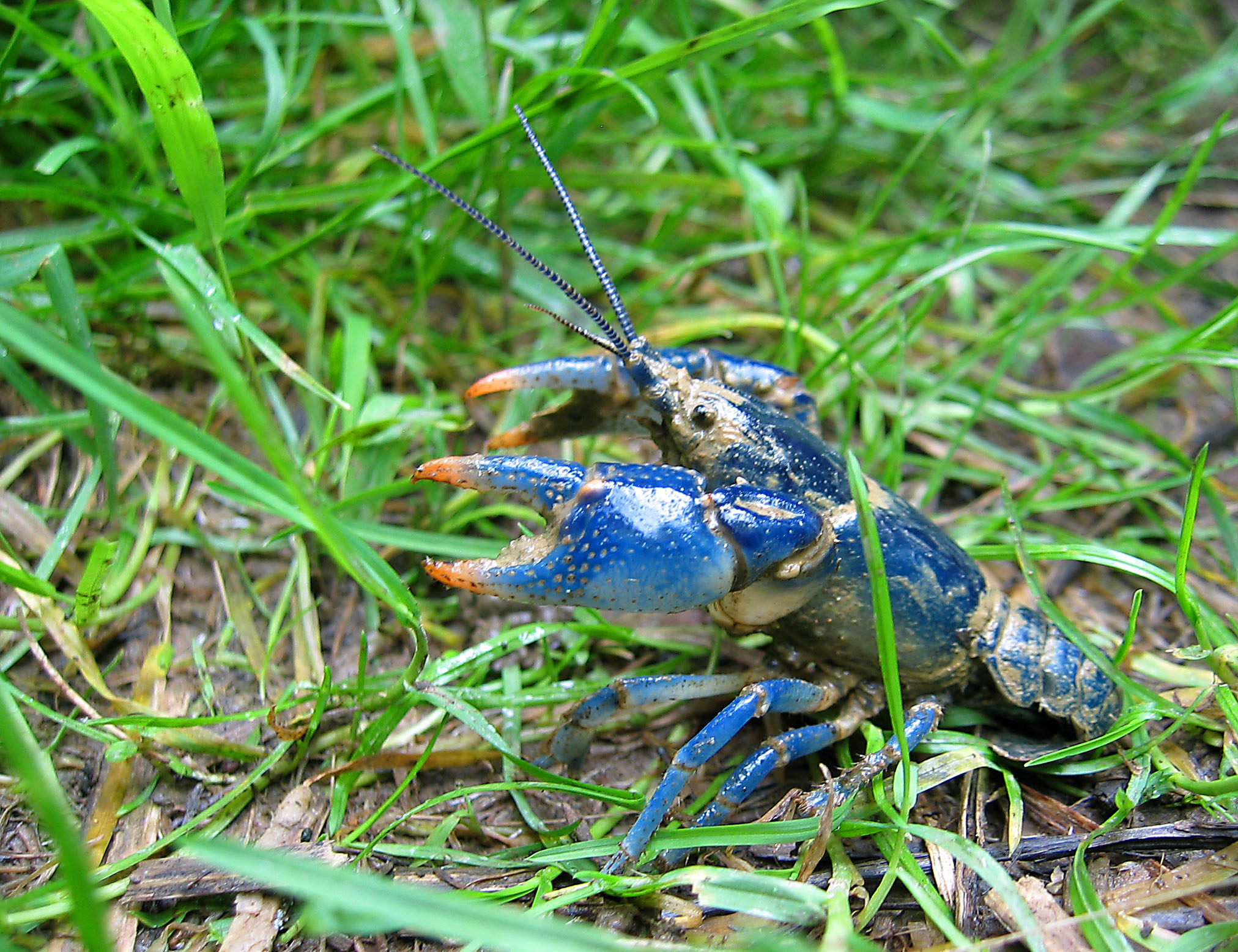

Conservation status
- Least Concern (IUCN 3.1)

- Apparently Secure (NatureServe)

Scientific classification
- Kingdom: Animalia
- Phylum: Arthropoda
- Clade: Pancrustacea
- Class: Malacostraca
- Order: Decapoda
- Suborder: Pleocyemata
- Family: Cambaridae
- Genus: Cambarus
- Species: C. monongalensis

Binomial name
- Cambarus monongalensis Ortmann, 1905

= Cambarus monongalensis =

Species of crayfish

Cambarus monongalensis, the blue crayfish or Monongahela crayfish, is a species of burrowing crayfish native to Pennsylvania and West Virginia. It has also been found recently in Ohio. The common name refers to the Monongahela River, with the first specimens being collected from Edgewood Park, Allegheny County, Pennsylvania. It is included on the IUCN Red List as a species of Least Concern.

In 2019, a geographically distinct mountain population formerly assigned to C. monongalensis was described as the separate species Cambarus fetzneri on the basis of genetic and morphological differences.

It should not be confused with Procambarus alleni, also known as the blue crayfish, which is endemic to Florida and a popular aquarium crustacean.
