= Syneta pilosa =

Scientific classification
- Domain: Eukaryota
- Kingdom: Animalia
- Phylum: Arthropoda
- Class: Insecta
- Order: Coleoptera
- Suborder: Polyphaga
- Infraorder: Cucujiformia
- Family: Chrysomelidae
- Genus: Syneta
- Species: S. pilosa

Binomial name
- Syneta pilosa Brown, 1940

Species of beetle

Syneta pilosa is a species of leaf beetle. It is found in North America.
