= Cheat Bridge, West Virginia =

Unincorporated community in West Virginia, United States

- Unincorporated community
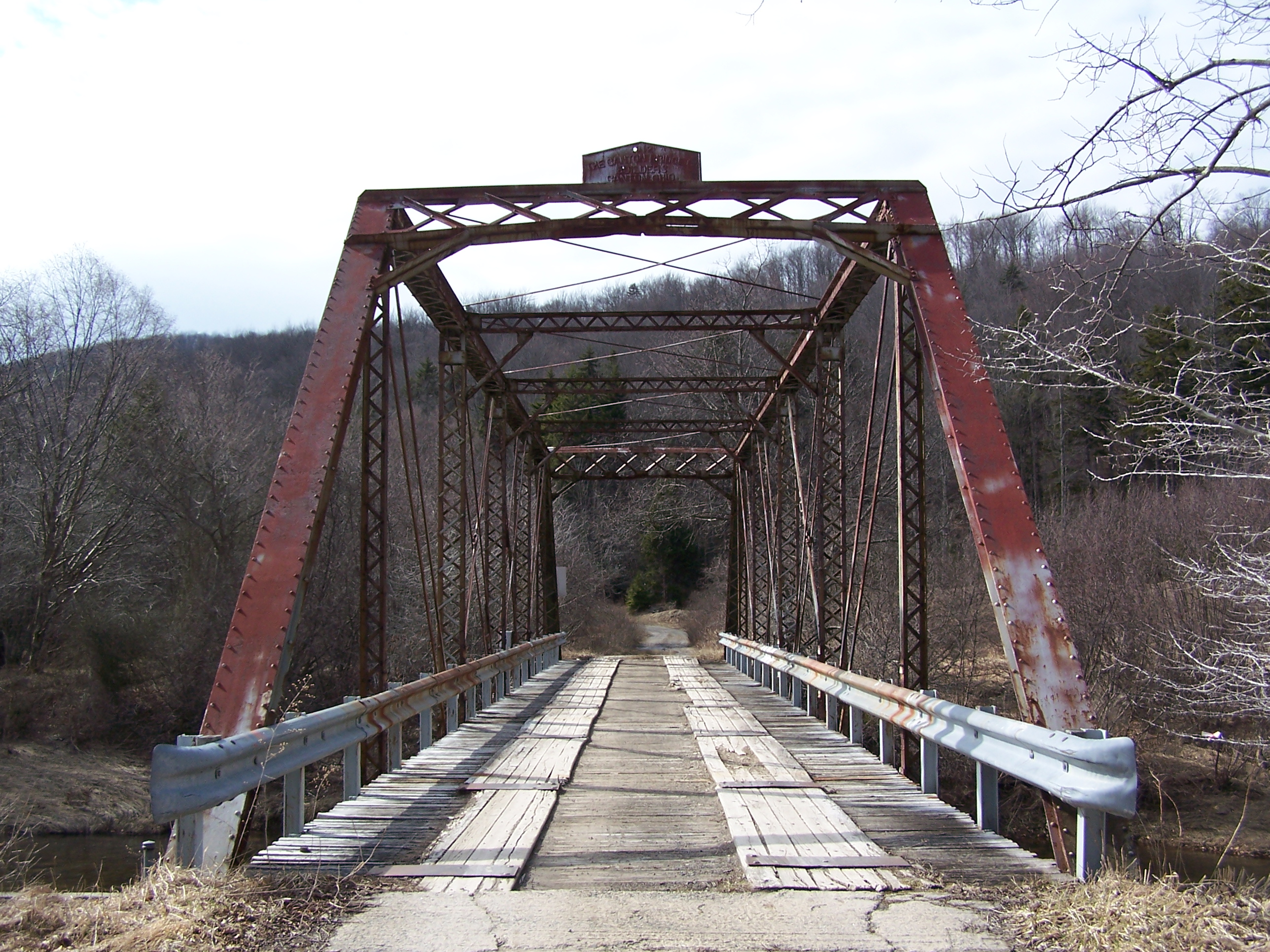
- CR 250/4 bridge over Shavers Fork

- Location of Cheat Bridge, West Virginia
- Coordinates: 38°36′42″N 79°52′27″W
- Country: United States
- State: West Virginia
- County: Randolph
- Elevation: 3,560 ft (1,090 m)
- Time zone: UTC-5 (Eastern (EST))
  - Summer (DST): UTC-4 (EDT)
- Area code: 304/681
- GNIS feature ID: 1550676

Cheat Bridge is an unincorporated community in southeastern Randolph County, West Virginia, United States. It is located near U.S. Route 250's crossing of Shavers Fork.

== The bridge ==
As its name suggests, Cheat Bridge is named for a historical bridge over Shavers Fork of Cheat River located here and first built in the 19th century to service the Staunton-Parkersburg Turnpike. The original covered bridge was built before the American Civil War. After the Battle of Greenbrier River (3 October 1861), Union troops used the bridge when they built extensive military defenses at nearby Cheat Summit. Over 40 years later, celebrated satirist and short story writer Ambrose Bierce revisited the site of his youthful service. He found that “…the old wooden covered bridge across the Cheat River looks hardly a day older, and is still elaborately decorated with soldiers’ names carven with jack-knives.”

The current bridge along the route of the Staunton-Parkersburg Turnpike is a steel truss bridge built in 1912 by the Canton Bridge Company. It carries County Route 250/4, which provides access to adjacent Monongahela National Forest lands. The existing bridge is in poor shape and has a 3-ton load limit.

Since 1934, through traffic along U.S. Route 250 has crossed Shavers Fork just downstream of the earlier route on a high-speed alignment. A 1934 steel truss bridge original to the site was replaced in 2021.

== Durbin & Greenbrier Valley Railroad ==
Cheat Bridge also serves as a stop for the Cheat Mountain Salamander train operated by the Durbin and Greenbrier Valley Railroad. Prior to 2008, the Cheat Mountain Salamander was powered by a railcar that departed from Cheat Bridge. Beginning in 2008, this train is now operated as a regular passenger train departing from the Elkins depot. For a shorter 3-hour trip to Spruce, passengers may still board at Cheat Bridge.

== See also ==
- Monongahela National Forest
- Gaudineer Knob, located to the east on Shavers Mountain
- White Top, located to the west on Cheat Mountain
