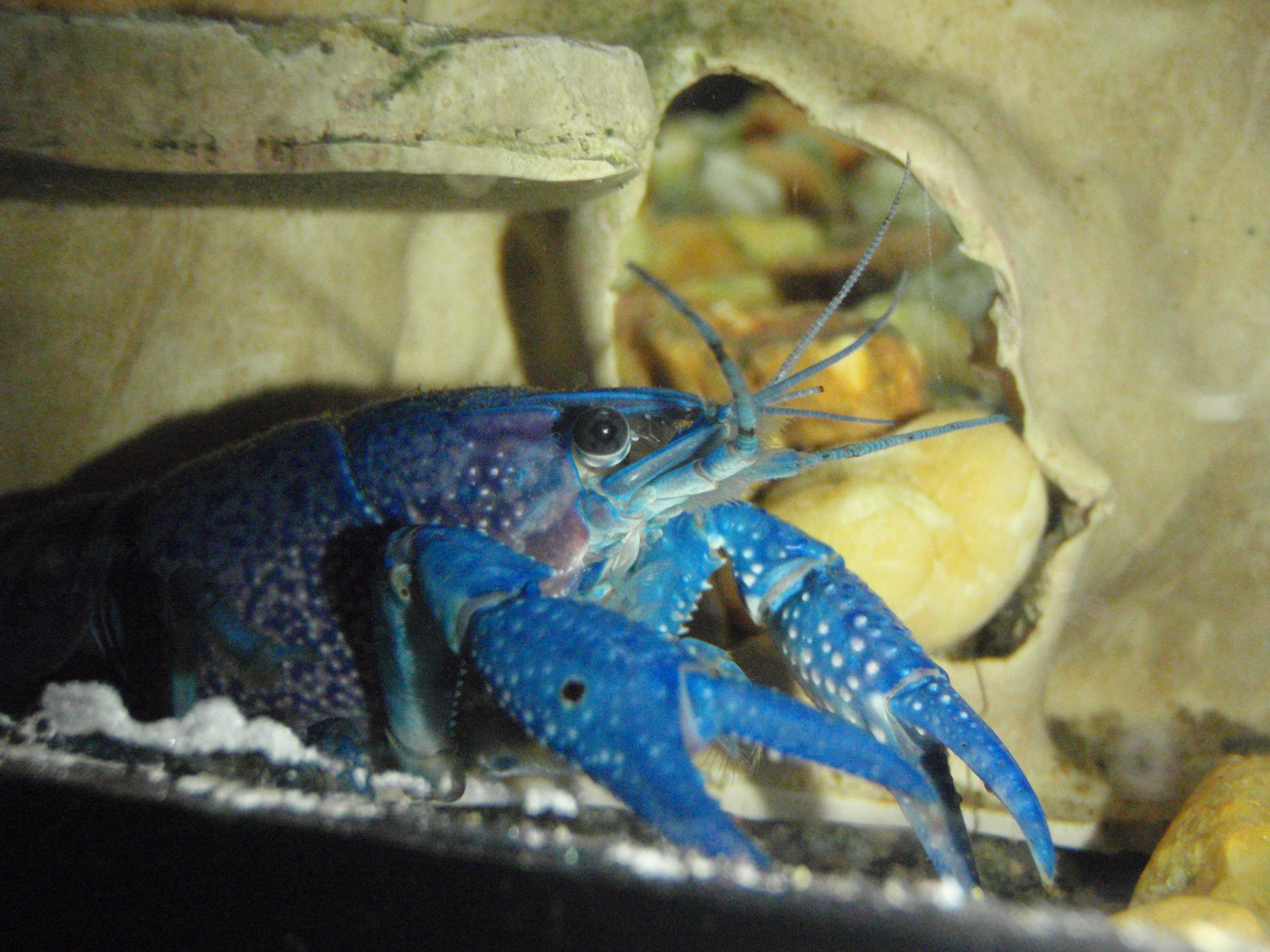
- The most common morph in aquaristics called the blue crayfish

Conservation status
- Least Concern (IUCN 3.1)

- Apparently Secure (NatureServe)

Scientific classification
- Kingdom: Animalia
- Phylum: Arthropoda
- Clade: Pancrustacea
- Class: Malacostraca
- Order: Decapoda
- Suborder: Pleocyemata
- Family: Cambaridae
- Genus: Procambarus
- Species: P. alleni

Binomial name
- Procambarus alleni (Faxon, 1884)

= Procambarus alleni =

Everglades crayfish

Species of crustacean

The Everglades crayfish (Procambarus alleni), sometimes called the Florida crayfish, the blue crayfish, the electric blue crayfish, or the sapphire crayfish, is a species of freshwater crayfish endemic to Florida in the United States. Its natural range is the area east of St. Johns River and all of Florida from Levy County and Marion County southwards, as well as on some of the Florida Keys. It is included on the IUCN Red List as a species of Least Concern. The blue crayfish is frequently kept in a freshwater aquaria. In the wild, this species varies from brown-tan to blue, but an aquarium strain has been selectively bred to achieve a brilliant cobalt blue color.

It should not be confused with the burrowing Cambarus monongalensis, also known as the blue crayfish, but native to Pennsylvania, Virginia and West Virginia.

== Gallery ==
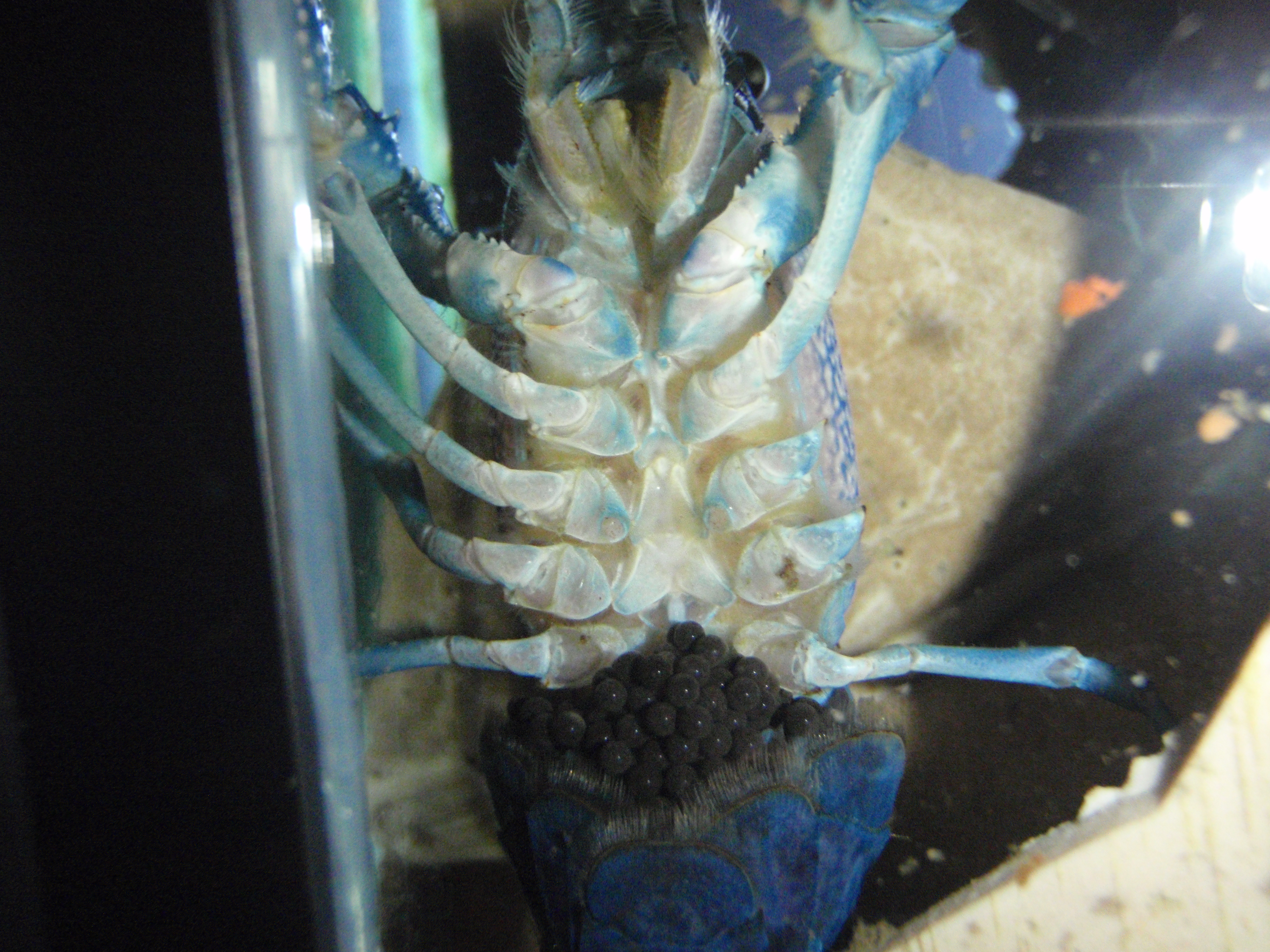
Gravid mother cradling eggs inside her swimmerets

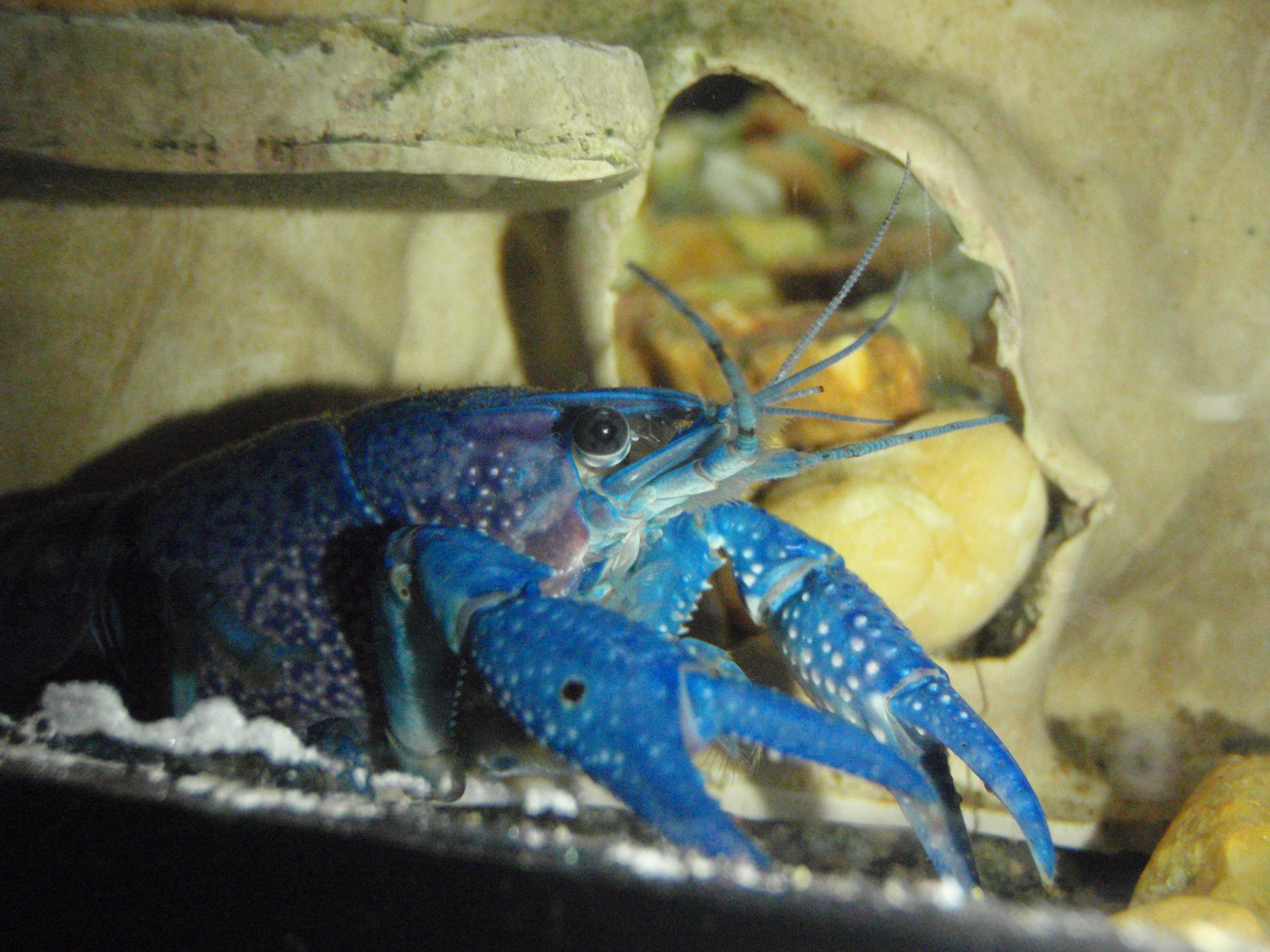
Female dwelling in a small cave

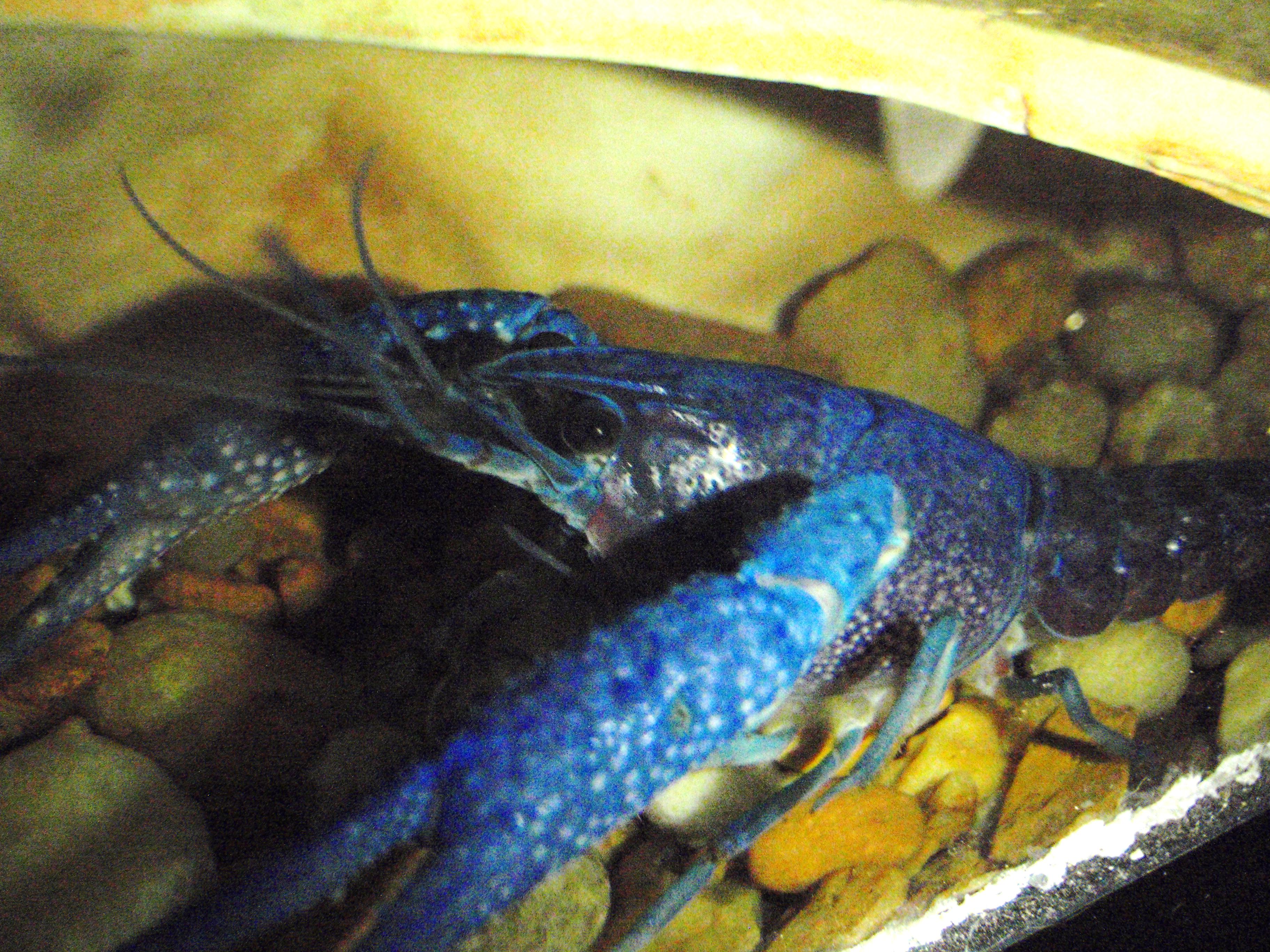
Male dwelling in a small cave
