= Shaver (surname) =

Shaver is a surname. Notable people with the surname include:

- Al Shaver, Canadian retired sportscaster, member of the Hockey Hall of Fame
- Alex Laurence Shaver, Canadian politician
- Billy Joe Shaver (1939–2020), American country music singer and songwriter
- Clem L. Shaver (1867–1954), American politician
- Daniel Shaver (1989–2016), American shooting victim
- Donald Shaver (1920–2018), Canadian pioneer in the poultry industry
- Dorothy Shaver (1893–1959), first woman in the United States to head a multimillion-dollar firm
- Earnie Shavers (1944–2022), American retired professional boxer born Earnie Shaver
- Eddy Shaver (1962–2000), American country-rock guitarist, arranger, and songwriter; son of Billy Joe Shaver
- Frank Thomas Shaver (1881–1969), Canadian politician
- Gaius Shaver (1910–1998), American college football player
- George Washington Shaver (1832–1900), American pioneer, founder of the Shaver Transportation Company
- Helen Shaver (born 1951), Canadian actress
- James L. Shaver (1902–1985), American politician
- James L. Shaver Jr. (1927–2021), American politician; son of the above
- Jeff Shaver (born 1963), American baseball player
- Leonidas Shaver (died 1855), Utah Territorial Supreme Court justice
- Mike Shaver (born 1977), member of the Mozilla project
- Peter Shaver (1776–1866), farmer, businessman and politician in Upper Canada
- Richard Sharpe Shaver (1907–1975), American writer and artist
- Robert G. Shaver (1831–1915), American lawyer, militia leader, American Civil War Confederate colonel, and a Ku Klux Klan leader
- Ron Shaver (born 1951), Canadian retired figure skater
- Stan Shaver (1948–2024), American politician
- Stephanie Shaver (born 1975), writer, artist, and computer game designer
- Tony Shaver (born 1954), American basketball player and coach

== Fictional characters ==
- Ryan Shaver, a character in the novel and Netflix series 13 Reasons Why

== See also ==
- Shavers (disambiguation)
