= Alpena, West Virginia =

Unincorporated community in West Virginia, United States

- Unincorporated community
- Location within West Virginia Location within the United States
- Coordinates: 38°54′35″N 79°39′04″W
- Country: United States
- State: West Virginia
- County: Randolph
- Elevation: 2,717 ft (828 m)
- Time zone: UTC-5 (Eastern (EST))
  - Summer (DST): UTC-4 (EDT)
- GNIS ID: 1553717

Alpena is an unincorporated community in Randolph County, West Virginia, United States.

Originally settled as Alpina, the village was located at the foothills of Shaver's Mountain and named after the Swiss Alps because the terrain reminded the settlers of their homeland. Nearby is Spruce Knob, the state's highest elevation, at 4,863 feet. The name Alpina was later corrupted to Alpena, though the exact circumstances of this change are unclear.

== Climate ==
According to the Köppen Climate Classification system, Alpena has a humid continental climate, abbreviated "Dfb" on climate maps.
