= Bemis, West Virginia =

Unincorporated community in West Virginia, United States

- Unincorporated community
- Location within West Virginia Location within the United States
- Coordinates: 38°48′43″N 79°44′20″W
- Country: United States
- State: West Virginia
- County: Randolph
- Elevation: 2,582 ft (787 m)
- Time zone: UTC-5 (Eastern (EST))
  - Summer (DST): UTC-4 (EDT)
- Area codes: 304 & 681
- GNIS feature ID: 1553855

Bemis is an unincorporated community in Randolph County, West Virginia, United States. It is located on Shavers Fork, along County Route 22, some 9.8 miles (15.8 km) southeast of Elkins.

The community has the name of Harry Bemis, a businessperson in the lumber industry.
