= Laurel Fork South Wilderness =

Wilderness area in West Virginia, United States

- IUCN category Ib (wilderness area)
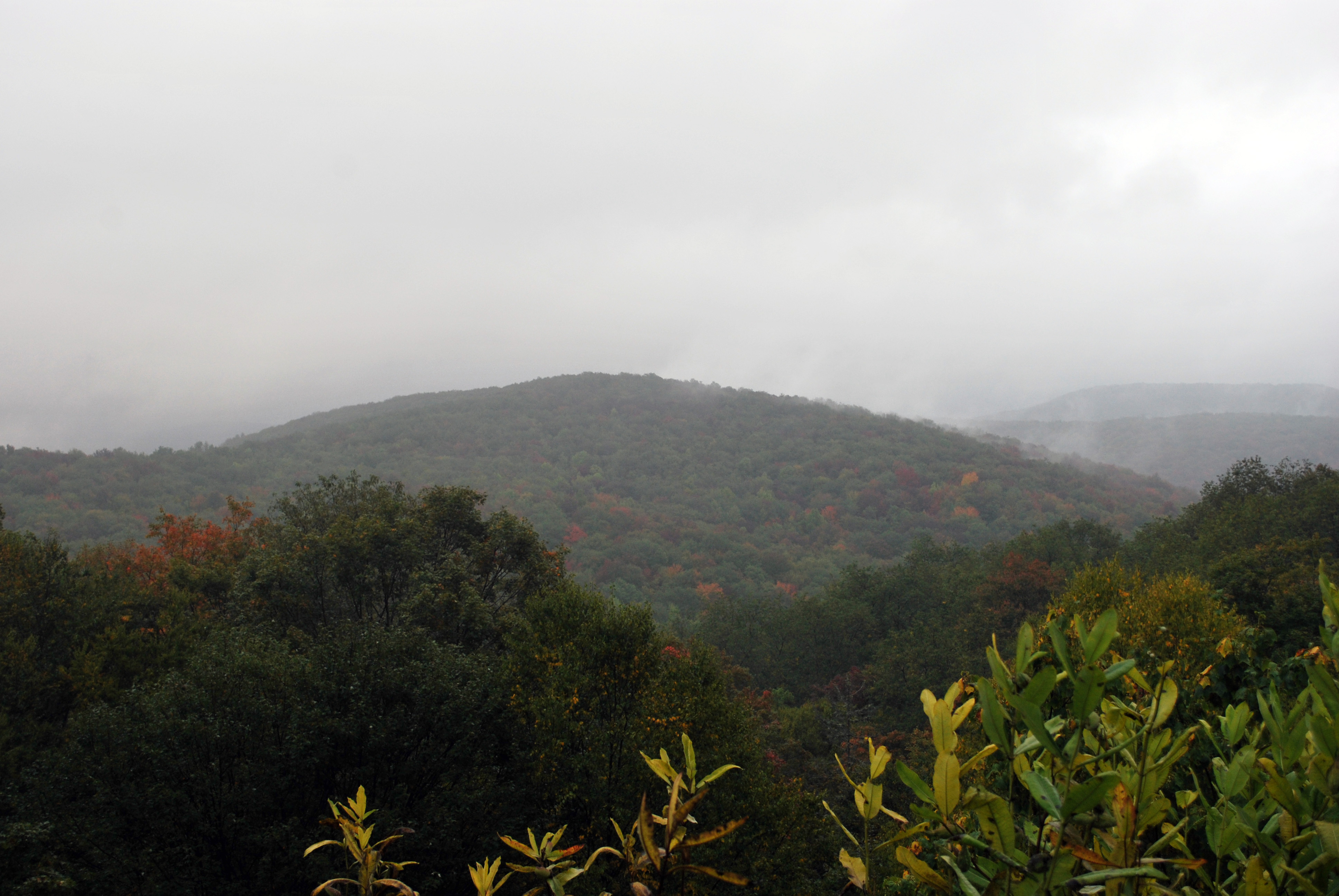
- Overlook of Laurel Fork valley along Middle Mountain Road on a foggy fall day.

- Location within West Virginia
- Location: West Virginia, United States
- Coordinates: 38°42′43″N 79°43′07″W
- Area: 5,784 acres (23.41 km^{2})
- Established: 1983
- Operator: Monongahela National Forest
- Website: Laurel Fork Wildernesses

Laurel Fork South Wilderness is a U.S. Wilderness Area located in the Greenbrier Ranger District of Monongahela National Forest in West Virginia. The Wilderness protects high-elevation lands along Laurel Fork (Cheat River) and is bordered by Middle Mountain to the west. It is a companion to Laurel Fork North Wilderness, the two being split by Randolph County Route 40. Laurel Fork South contains 9 miles (14 km) of hiking trails.

== History ==
The land that now comprises Laurel Fork South Wilderness was once private forestland owned by the Laurel River Lumber Company. The area was first logged by floating the logs down the Laurel Fork, and later by railroad. By 1921, the virgin forestland was fully logged. The U.S. Forest Service acquired the area soon thereafter, adding it to Monongahela National Forest.

Laurel Fork South and Laurel Fork North Wildernesses were designated in 1983 by the Monongahela National Forest, West Virginia, Land Designations law. Laurel Fork South was reduced by approximately 89 acres (0.36 km^{2}) by the Omnibus Public Lands Management Act of 2009 to allow vehicle travel on Forest Road 424 in the eastern edge of the Wilderness.

== See also ==
- Laurel Fork North Wilderness
- Laurel Fork
- Monongahela National Forest
