= Gaudineer Knob =

Mountain in United States of America

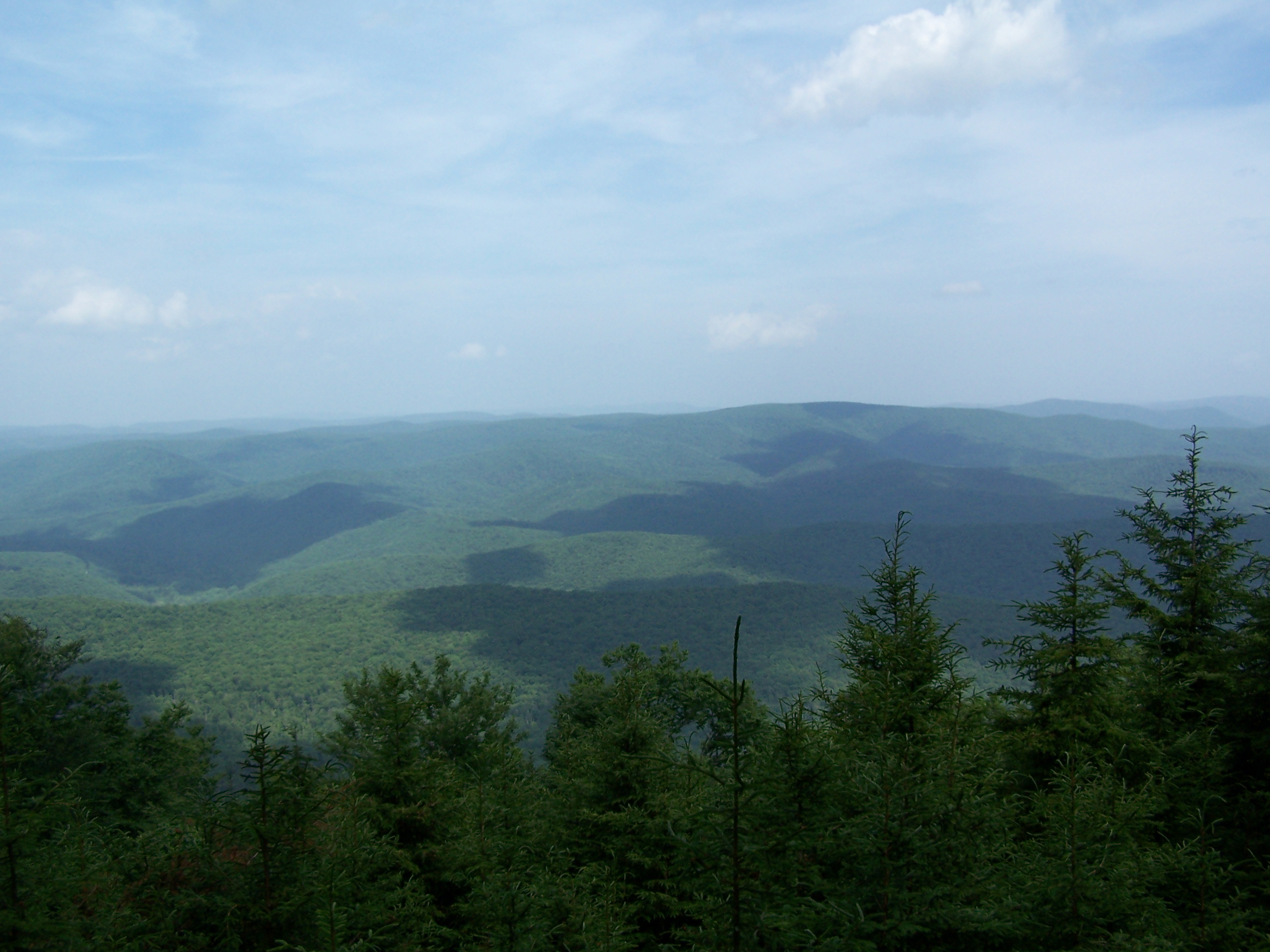
- View from Gaudineer Knob

Highest point
- Elevation: 4,449 ft (1,356 m)
- Prominence: 720 ft (220 m)
- Coordinates: 38°36′55″N 79°50′39″W

Geography
- Location within West Virginia
- Location: Pocahontas, West Virginia, United States
- Parent range: Shavers Mountain

Climbing
- Access: drive-up via FR 27A

Gaudineer Knob is a mountain summit on the Randolph/Pocahontas County line in eastern West Virginia, US. It is the highest elevation (4,449 ft; 1,356 m) of Shavers Mountain, a ridge of the Alleghenies, and is located about 1.7 miles (2.7 km) east of Cheat Bridge. The Gaudineer Knob Lookout Tower, a fire tower, formerly occupied the high point of the knob.

== History ==
The knob had been a prominent, but unnamed, peak in a vast wilderness when in the late 1930s it was named in memory of Donald Gaudineer, one of the early rangers in the Monongahela National Forest. As a young forester, Gaudineer had been assigned to the Southern District of the recently established forest. His headquarters at that time occupied the former Craig Lumber Company office at Thornwood. During his years as ranger for the Greenbrier District, Gaudineer oversaw reforestation projects, the building of roads to enhance wildfire protection, the erection of fire towers in his district, and various other routine forest management activities. In the mid-1930s Gaudineer was transferred to the Cheat Ranger District, at Parsons, and on April 27, 1936, he was killed while attempting to rescue his children from a house fire. The U.S. Forest Service selected the scenic peak east of Cheat Bridge in his former ranger district as a fitting memorial.

=== Gaudineer Knob Lookout Tower ===
Only the concrete footers remain from the fire tower that from 1936 through the 1970s surveyed the forest landscape surrounding Gaudineer Knob.

== Gaudineer Scenic Area ==
The 140-acre (57 ha) Gaudineer Scenic Area is situated immediately north of Gaudineer Knob at about 4,000 feet (1,200 m) elevation. It was established in 1964 and was declared a National Natural Landmark in 1974 owing to a 50-acre (20 ha) virgin red spruce stand that was spared the lumberman's saw when the surrounding countryside was clear-cut in the early 20th century.
