= Laurel Fork North Wilderness =

Wilderness area in West Virginia, United States

- IUCN category Ib (wilderness area)
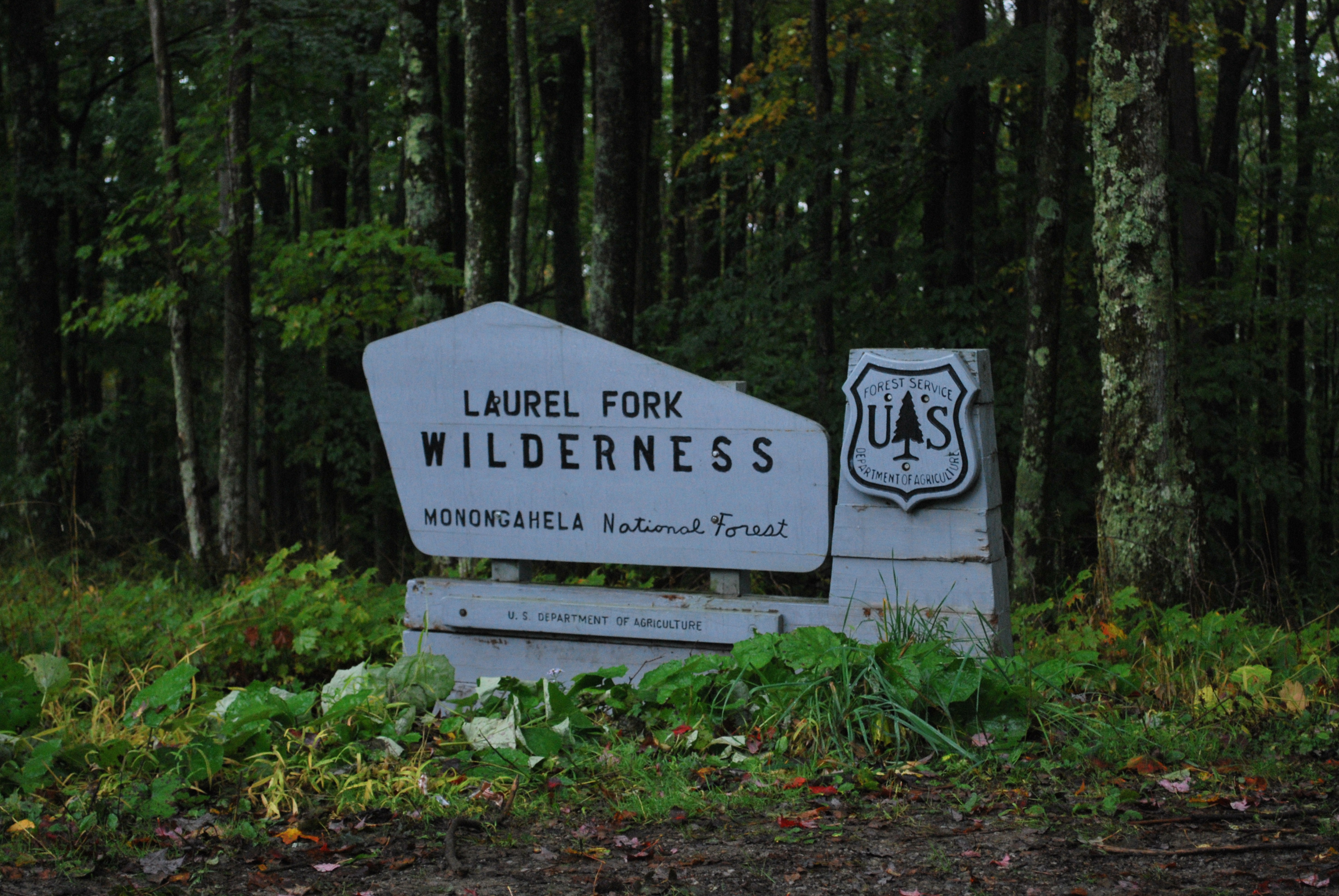
- Sign for Laurel Fork Wilderness on Middle Mountain Road.

- Location within West Virginia
- Location: Randolph, West Virginia, United States
- Coordinates: 38°45′27″N 79°40′23″W
- Area: 6,055 acres (24.50 km^{2})
- Established: 1983
- Operator: Monongahela National Forest
- Website: Laurel Fork Wildernesses

Laurel Fork North Wilderness is a U.S. Wilderness Area located in the Greenbrier Ranger District of Monongahela National Forest in West Virginia. The Wilderness protects high-elevation lands along Laurel Fork (Cheat River) and is bordered by Middle Mountain to the west. It is a companion to Laurel Fork South Wilderness, the two being split by Randolph County Route 40. Laurel Fork North contains 9.5 miles (15.3 km) of hiking trails.

== History ==
The land that now comprises Laurel Fork North Wilderness was once private forestland owned by the Laurel River Lumber Company. The area was first logged by floating the logs down the Laurel Fork, and later by railroad. By 1921, the virgin forestland was fully logged. The U.S. Forest Service acquired the area soon thereafter, adding it to Monongahela National Forest.

Laurel Fork South and Laurel Fork North Wildernesses were designated in 1983 by the Monongahela National Forest, West Virginia, Land Designations law.

== See also ==
- Laurel Fork South Wilderness
- Laurel Fork
- Monongahela National Forest
