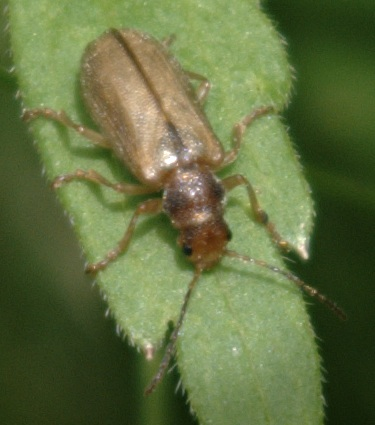
- Syneta sp.

Scientific classification
- Domain: Eukaryota
- Kingdom: Animalia
- Phylum: Arthropoda
- Class: Insecta
- Order: Coleoptera
- Suborder: Polyphaga
- Infraorder: Cucujiformia
- Family: Chrysomelidae
- Subfamily: Synetinae
- Genus: Syneta; Dejean, 1835

Type species
- Crioceris betulae Fabricius, 1792

= Syneta =

Genus of beetles

Syneta is a genus of leaf beetles in the subfamily Synetinae. There are about 11 described species in Syneta. The genus is entirely holarctic in distribution, with species appearing in North America, Siberia, East Asia and Northern Europe.

== Nomenclature ==
The generic name Syneta, derived from the Greek word συνετός meaning "sagacious", was first used by Eschscholtz in his collection, though he never published it. Syneta was then listed in the last two editions of Dejean's Catalogue of Coleoptera. No characters for the genus were mentioned in the Catalogue, though three species were listed; of these species, only one (Syneta betulae) was considered valid, the other two being nomina nuda, automatically making it the type species of the genus. Because of its inclusion in the Catalogue with a valid species, the name Syneta should be attributed to Dejean, though it has also been attributed to Lacordaire, who was the first to publish it with a description in 1845.

== Species ==
- Syneta adamsi Baly, 1877
- Syneta albida LeConte, 1857 (western fruit beetle)
- Syneta betulae (Fabricius, 1792)
  - Syneta betulae amurensis Pic, 1901
  - Syneta betulae betulae (Fabricius, 1792)
- Syneta brevitibialis Kimoto, 1971
- Syneta carinata Mannerheim, 1843
- Syneta extorris Brown, 1940
  - Syneta extorris borealis Brown, 1961
  - Syneta extorris extorris Brown, 1940
- Syneta ferruginea (Germar, 1811) (rusty leaf beetle)
- Syneta hamata Horn, 1893
- Syneta pilosa Brown, 1940
- Syneta seriata LeConte, 1859
- Syneta simplex LeConte, 1857
  - Syneta simplex simplex LeConte, 1857
  - Syneta simplex subalpina Edwards, 1953
