= Gaudineer Scenic Area =

Scenic area in West Virginia, United States

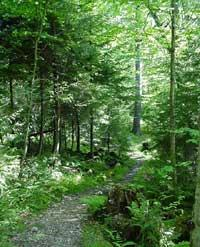
- Hiking trail in Gaudineer Scenic Area.

- Location within West Virginia
- Location: West Virginia, United States
- Coordinates: 38°37′41″N 79°50′33″W
- Area: 140 acres (57 ha)
- Elevation: 3,996 ft (1,218 m)
- Established: October 1964
- Operator: Monongahela National Forest
- Website: Gaudineer Scenic Area

The Gaudineer Scenic Area (GSA) is a scenic area and National Natural Landmark in the Monongahela National Forest (MNF). It is situated just north of Gaudineer Knob of Shavers Mountain on the border of Randolph and Pocahontas Counties, West Virginia, USA, about 5 miles (8.0 km) northwest of the town of Durbin.

== Description ==
The GSA is located in the Greenbrier Ranger District of the MNF. It lies near the crest of Shavers Mountain immediately north of Gaudineer Knob, the mountain's highest peak at 4,432 feet (1,351 m). The Scenic Area itself is at about 4,000 feet (1,200 m). Its total land area is 140 acres (570,000 m^{2}) and approximately 50 acres (200,000 m^{2}) of the area is classified as virgin red spruce forest. Trees in this section range up to 40 inches (1,000 mm) in diameter at chest height and are upwards of 300 years old. The remaining 90 acres (360,000 m^{2}) have only been subjected to selective timber harvesting, mostly for the task of removing broken limbs. The GSA contains—in addition to red spruce—excellent first and second-growth specimens of several native hardwoods, including red maple, sugar maple, yellow birch, and beech. Forest Service authorities estimate the total wood volume of the 140-acre (570,000 m^{2}) tract at 1,500,000 board feet (3,500 m^{3}).

== History ==
The area surrounding the GSA was thoroughly clear-cut between about 1900 and 1920 by lumbermen of the West Virginia Pulp and Paper Company, based at Cass. Maurice Brooks described the circumstances whereby a portion of the virgin forest was spared in his classic book on Appalachian natural history:

Some years before the Civil War a speculating land company bought a tract of 69,000 acres [280 km^{2}] on the slope of Shavers Mountain. Their tract fronted for about seven miles [11 km] along the eastern side of the mountain. To survey and mark their holdings the company hired a crew of men who must have found rough going in this wilderness. The crew did a good job, but its chief forgot one thing – the fact that a compass needle points to magnetic, not true north. In this area the angle of declination is about four degrees, a significant source of error on a seven-mile [11 km] front ... An experienced Virginia surveyor, in checking the data, discovered the error but said nothing about it. Presently, however, when the sale was being concluded and the deeds recorded, he brought the error to light, and under a sort of "doctrine of vacancy" claimed the wedge of land left by a corrected survey. His title was established, and he and his heirs found themselves owner of a seven-mile strip of forest, aggregating almost 900 acres [3.6 km^{2}]. While timber above and below the wedge was cut, this narrow holding was undisturbed. Its thickest end, a fringe of tall spruces on the near horizon, is just east of Gaudineer Tower. From these trees came seed to produce a new forest, a happy result of a hundred-year-old mistake.

The tract was eventually purchased by the Forest Service at the insistence of former MNF Supervisor Arthur A. Wood, who believed that future generations should know what an Appalachian spruce stand was like.

In October 1964 the Regional Forester designated this area as a Scenic Area and the Forest Service began to manage it as such. In December 1974 the GSA was designated a National Natural Landmark for its exceptional value. In May 1983 it was registered by the Society of American Foresters as an outstanding example of a vegetative community in a near natural condition dedicated for scientific and educational purposes.

== See also ==
- Shavers Fork Mountain Complex
- List of old growth forests
- List of National Natural Landmarks in West Virginia
