= Shaver Creek (Missouri) =

Stream in the American state of Missouri

Coordinates: 38.791407°N 93.087145°W

Shaver Creek is a tributary of Muddy Creek in the U.S. state of Missouri, in Pettis County.

Shaver Creek has the name of the local Shaver family.

== See also ==
- List of rivers of Missouri
