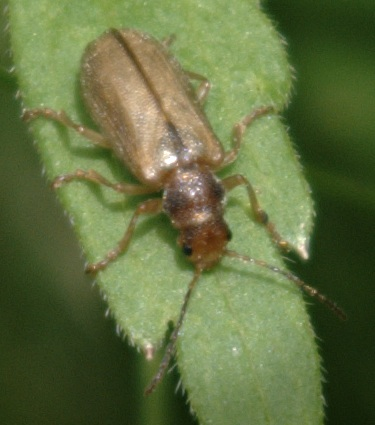
- Syneta sp.

Scientific classification
- Domain: Eukaryota
- Kingdom: Animalia
- Phylum: Arthropoda
- Class: Insecta
- Order: Coleoptera
- Suborder: Polyphaga
- Infraorder: Cucujiformia
- Family: Chrysomelidae
- Subfamily: Synetinae; LeConte & Horn, 1883

Genera
- Syneta; Thricolema

= Synetinae =

Subfamily of leaf beetles

The Synetinae are a small subfamily within the leaf beetle family (Chrysomelidae). They are found entirely within the Holarctic, mainly in North America but also appearing in parts of Europe and Asia. The subfamily contains only two genera, Syneta and Thricolema, with a total of 12 described species. The group is sometimes treated as a tribe of Eumolpinae, where they are known as Synetini.

== Classification ==
Historically, the genera Syneta and Thricolema were placed within the Orsodacnidae, which was formerly considered a subfamily within the Chrysomelidae. The family-group name was first proposed as "Synetae" in 1883 by John Lawrence LeConte and George Henry Horn, though it is often attributed instead to J. Gordon Edwards (1953) who classified Orsodacnidae as a family and suggested treating Syneta and Thricolema as a separate family, Synetidae. The Synetinae were later recognised as a subfamily within Chrysomelidae.

In a 1995 cladistic analysis of the leaf beetle subfamilies, Australian entomologist Chris A.M. Reid treated the Synetinae as a tribe (Synetini) within the subfamily Eumolpinae, based on the similarities of the larvae of Syneta with those in the Eumolpinae. However, the inclusion of Syneta in the Eumolpinae was disputed by other leaf beetle workers, who argued that the morphological data does not support their inclusion and that the similarities in larval characters are superficial, and that therefore Synetinae should be retained as a separate subfamily. The exact relationship of Synetinae with the other leaf beetle subfamilies is still unclear.
