= Shavers Fork =

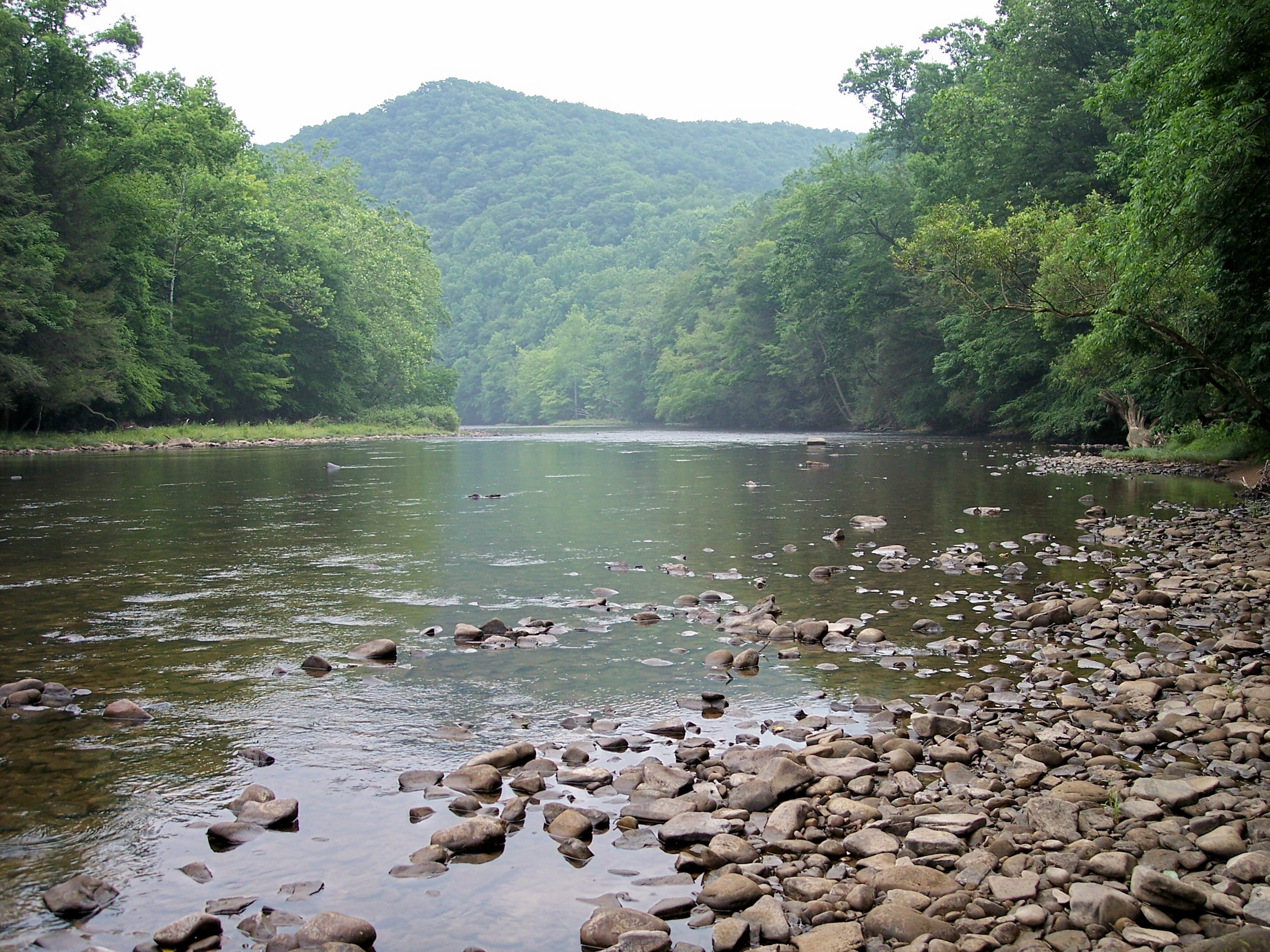
- Shavers Fork at Stuart Recreation Area in the Monongahela National Forest

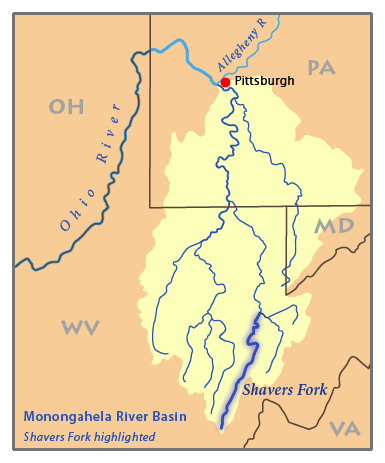
- Map of the Monongahela River basin, with Shavers Fork highlighted.

Location
- Country: United States
- State: West Virginia
- Counties: Tucker, Randolph, Pocahontas

Physical characteristics
- Source: Thorny Flat, Cheat Mountain
  - location: Pocahontas County, West Virginia
  - coordinates: 38°23′44″N 79°59′02″W
  - elevation: 4,553 ft (1,388 m)
- Mouth: Cheat River
  - location: Parsons, West Virginia
  - coordinates: 39°06′39″N 79°40′43″W
  - elevation: 1,621 ft (494 m)
- Length: 89 mi (143 km)
- Basin size: 214 sq mi (550 km^{2})
- Discharge
  - location: Bowden, West Virginia
  - average: 445 cu ft/s (12.6 m^{3}/s)
  - minimum: 99 cu ft/s (2.8 m^{3}/s)(1976)
  - maximum: 27,600 cu ft/s (780 m^{3}/s)(2010)
- Discharge
  - location: Cheat Bridge, WV
  - average: 188 cu ft/s (5.3 m^{3}/s)

Shavers Fork of the Cheat River is situated in the Allegheny Mountains of eastern West Virginia, USA. It is 88.5 mi (142.4 km) long and forms the Cheat at its confluence with Black Fork at Parsons. It was traditionally considered one of the five Forks of Cheat and its upper reaches constitute the highest river in the eastern United States.

== Geography ==
Shavers Fork, via the Cheat, Monongahela and Ohio Rivers, is part of the watershed of the Mississippi River, draining an area of 214 mi^{2} (550 km^{2}). It flows for much of its length through the Monongahela National Forest, and drains mostly rural and forested areas. 97% of the river's basin is forested, and two-thirds of it is public land.

Shavers Fork rises in north-central Pocahontas County at Thorny Flat, highest peak of Cheat Mountain (4,848 ft; 1,478 m) and the site of Snowshoe Mountain ski resort. Its headwaters flow through the ghost town of Spruce. The river then flows generally north-northeastwardly through Randolph and Tucker Counties, where its valley is the trough between Cheat Mountain (to the west) and Shavers Mountain (to the east). Settlements along its course include Cheat Bridge, Bemis, Bowden, and Porterwood. The "High Falls of Cheat" (15 feet [4.6 m] high) is a few miles upstream of Bemis. Shavers Fork ultimately joins the Black Fork at Parsons to form the Cheat at an elevation of 1,621 ft (494 m).

== Names ==
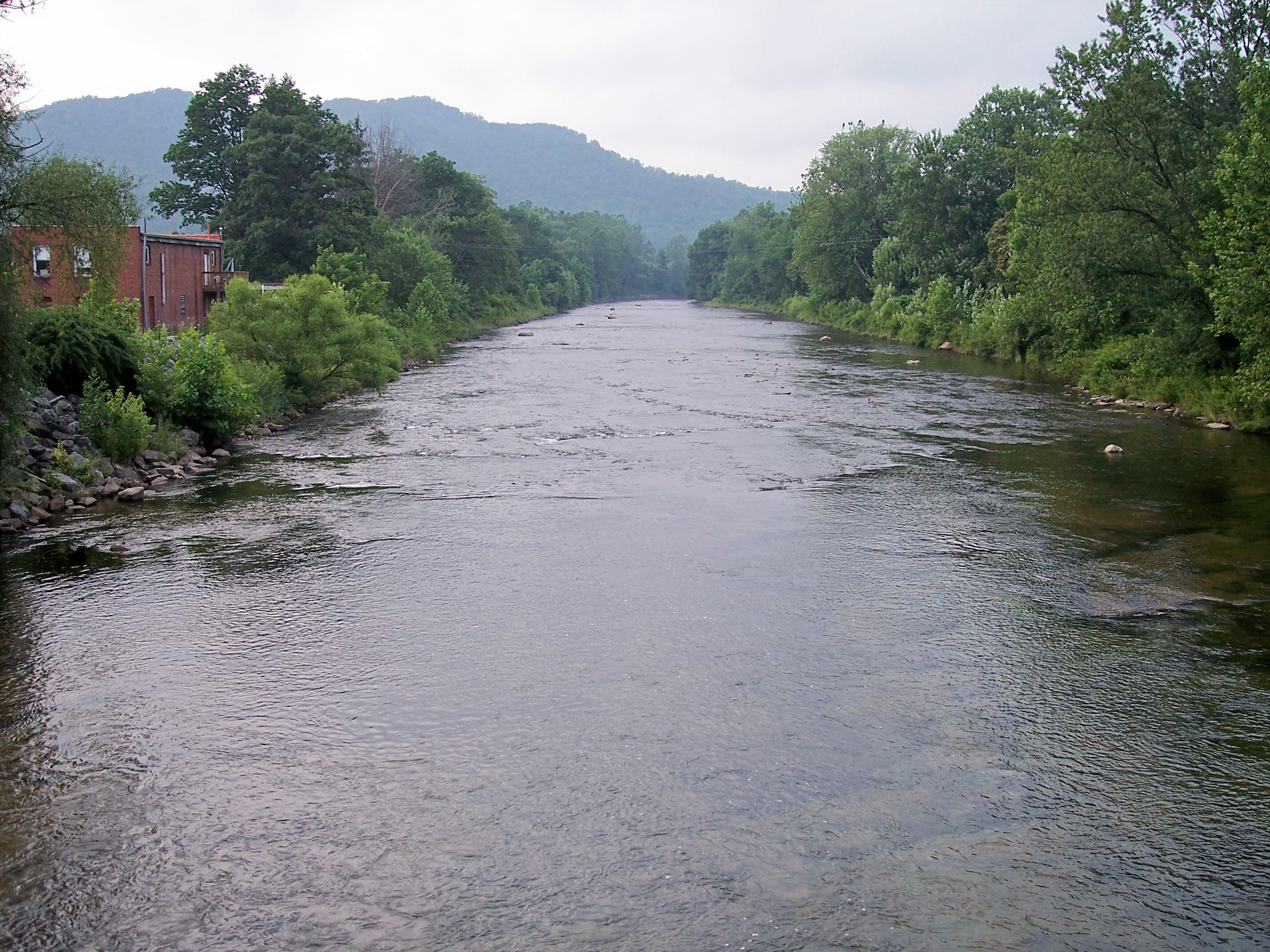
Shavers Fork in downtown Parsons

The creek was named after the local Shaver family. According to the Geographic Names Information System, Shavers Fork has also been known historically as:

- Chavers Fork
- Main Cheat River
- Shafers Fork
- Shaffers Fork of Cheat River
- Shaver's Fork
- Shavers Fork River
- Shavers Fork of Cheat River

== Recreation ==
=== Fishing ===
Multiple West Virginia stage record fish were caught along the Shavers Fork.

== See also ==
- List of West Virginia rivers
- List of waterfalls in West Virginia
