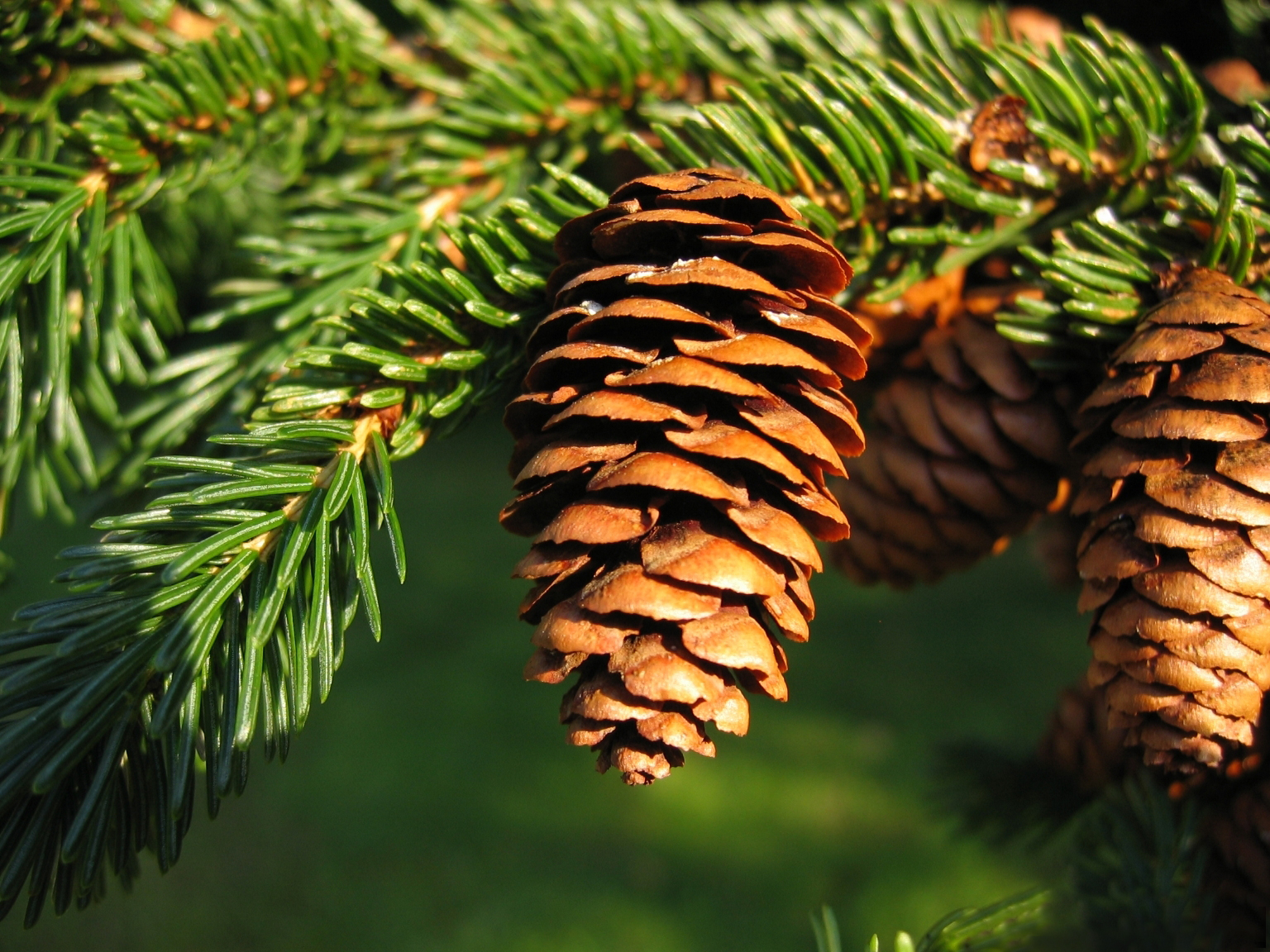

Conservation status
- Least Concern (IUCN 3.1)

- Secure (NatureServe)

Scientific classification
- Kingdom: Plantae
- Clade: Tracheophytes
- Clade: Gymnospermae
- Division: Pinophyta
- Class: Pinopsida
- Order: Pinales
- Family: Pinaceae
- Genus: Picea
- Species: P. rubens

Binomial name
- Picea rubens Sarg.
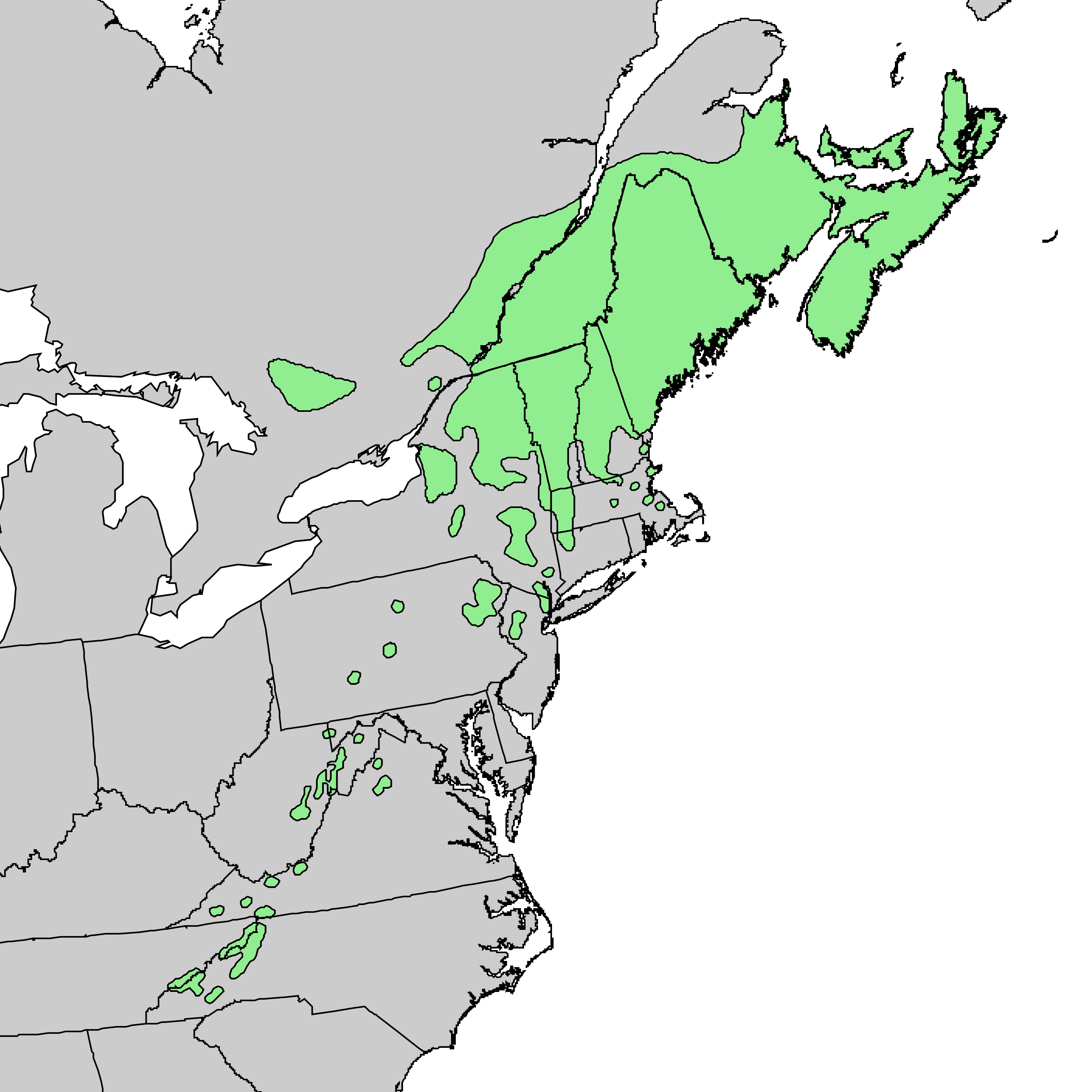

Synonyms
- Abies americana K.Koch nom. illeg.; Abies rubra (Du Roi) Poir.; Picea americana Suringar; Picea australis Small; Picea nigra var. rubra (Du Roi) Engelm.; Picea rubra (Du Roi) Link nom. illeg.; Picea rubra var. pendula Carrière; Picea rubra var. pusilla Peck; Picea rubra var. virgata (Rehder) Rehder; Picea rubra f. virgata Rehder; Pinus abies var. acutissima Münchh.; Pinus americana Gaertn. nom. illeg.; Pinus mariana var. rubra Du Roi; Pinus rubra (Du Roi) D.Don nom. illeg.; Pinus rubra var. violacea Endl.

= Picea rubens =

Red spruce

Species of plant

Picea rubens, commonly known as red spruce, is a species of spruce native to eastern North America, ranging from Nova Scotia to eastern Quebec and south-eastern Ontario, and south through the Adirondack Mountains and New England along the Appalachians to western North Carolina and eastern Tennessee. This species is also known as yellow spruce, West Virginia spruce, eastern spruce, and he-balsam. Red spruce is the provincial tree of Nova Scotia.

== Description ==
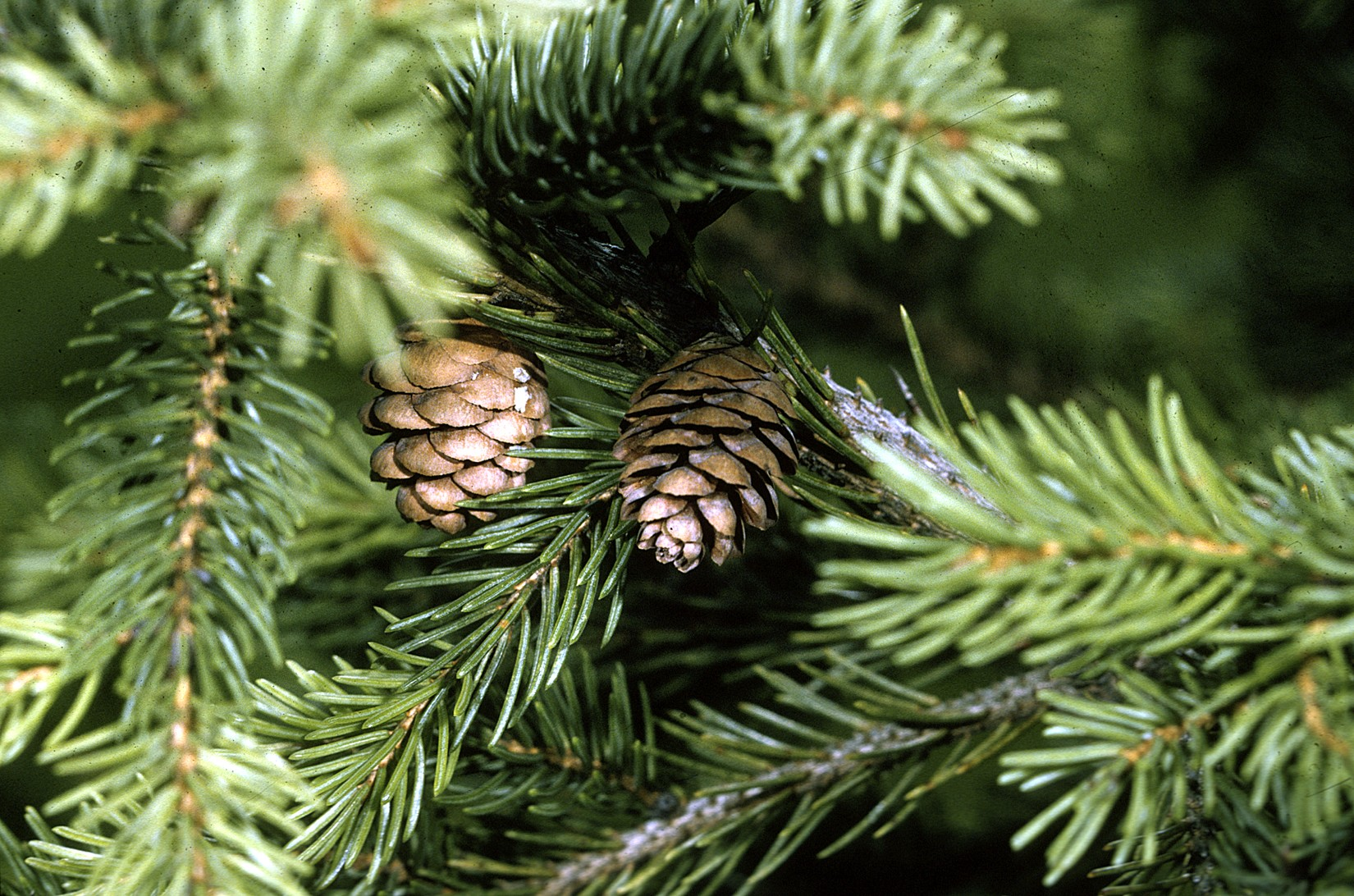
Foliage and cones

Red spruce is a perennial, shade-tolerant, late successional coniferous tree that under optimal conditions grows to 18–40 m (59–131 ft) tall with a trunk diameter of about 60 cm (24 in), though exceptional specimens can reach 46 m (151 ft) tall and 100 cm (39 inches) in diameter. It has a narrow conical crown. The leaves are needle-like, yellow-green, 12–15 mm (15/32–19/32 in) long, four-sided, curved, with a sharp point, and extend from all sides of the twig. The bark is gray-brown on the surface and red-brown on the inside, thin, and scaly. The wood is light, soft, has narrow rings, and has a slight red tinge. The cones are cylindrical, 3–5 cm (1 1/4–2 in) long, with a glossy red-brown color and stiff scales. The cones hang down from branches.

== Habitat ==
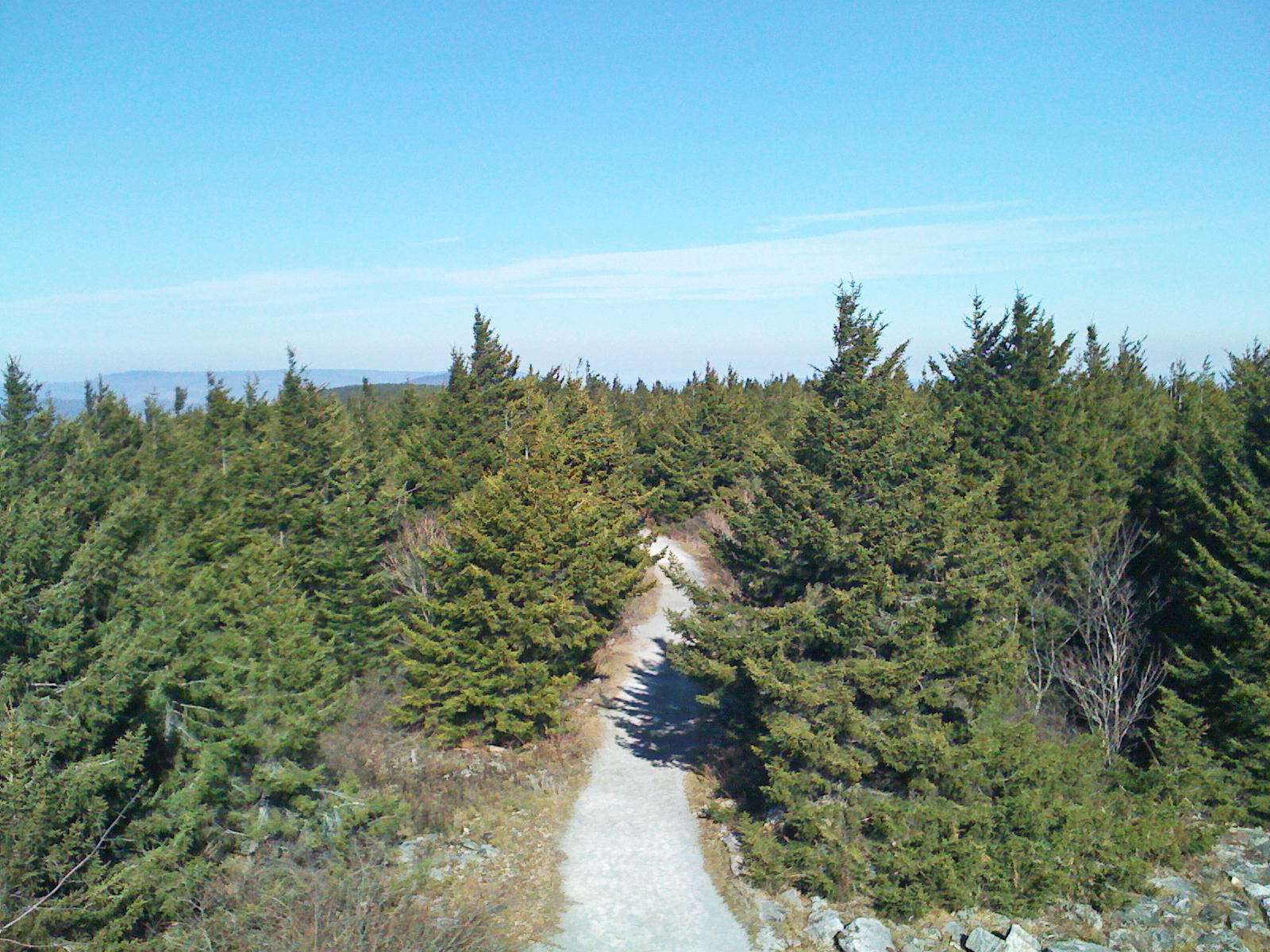
Dense red spruce forest in its native habitat at the summit of Spruce Knob, West Virginia

Red spruce grows at a slow to moderate rate, lives for 250 to 450+ years, and is very shade-tolerant when young. It is often found in pure stands or forests mixed with eastern white pine, balsam fir, or black spruce. Along with Fraser fir, red spruce is one of two primary tree types in the southern Appalachian spruce-fir forest, a distinct ecosystem found only in the highest elevations of the southern Appalachian Mountains. Its habitat is moist but well-drained sandy loam, often at high altitudes. Red spruce can be easily damaged by windthrow and acid rain.

Notable red spruce forests in West Virginia can be seen at Gaudineer Scenic Area, Canaan Valley, Roaring Plains West Wilderness, Dolly Sods Wilderness, and Spruce Mountain, all sites of former extensive red spruce forest.

== Related species ==
It is closely related to black spruce, and hybrids between the two are frequent where their ranges meet. Genetic data suggests that the red spruce peripatrically speciated from the black spruce during glaciation in the Pleistocene.

== Uses ==
Red spruce is used for Christmas trees and is an important wood used in making paper pulp. It is also an excellent tonewood and is used in many higher-end acoustic guitars and violins, as well as sound boards. The sap can be used to make spruce gum. Leafy red spruce twigs are boiled with sugar and flavoring to make spruce beer or spruce pudding. It can be used as construction lumber and is good for millwork and for crates.

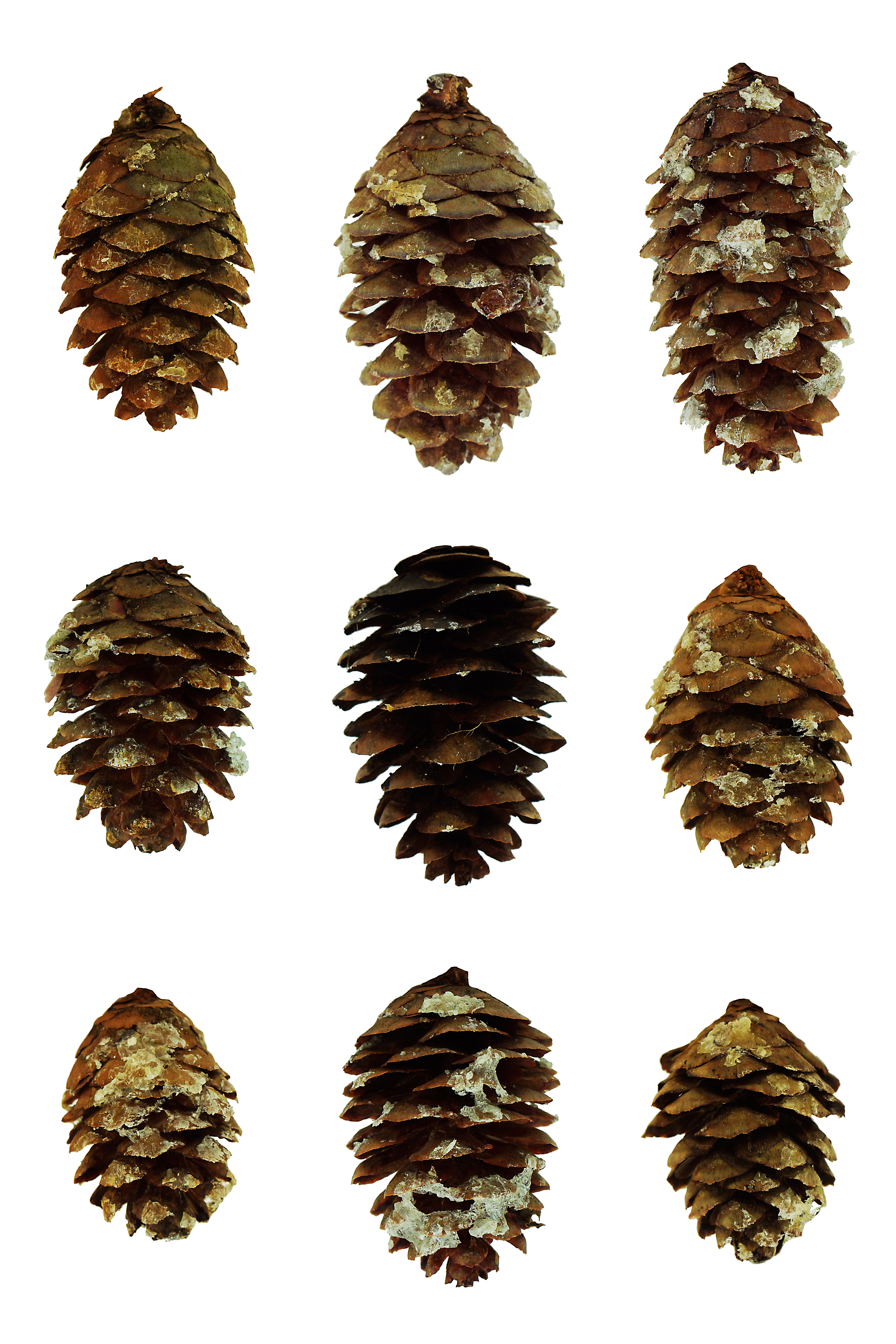
Red spruce cones from the Pisgah National Forest

== Damaging factors ==
Like most trees, red spruce is subject to insect parasitism. Their insect enemy is the spruce budworm, although it is a bigger problem for white spruce and balsam fir. Other issues that have been damaging red spruce have included the increase in acid rain and current climate change.

One of the consequences of acid rain deposition is the decrease of soil exchangeable calcium and increase of aluminum. This is because acid precipitation disrupts cation and nutrition cycling in forest ecosystems. Components of acid rain such as H^{+}, NO_{3}^{−}, and SO_{4}^{2-} limit the uptake of calcium by trees and can increase aluminum availability.

Calcium concentration is important for red spruce for physiological processes such as dark respiration and cold tolerance, as well as disease resistance, signal transduction, membrane and cell wall synthesis and function, and regulation of stomata. Conversely, dissolved aluminum can be toxic or can interfere with root uptake of calcium and other nutrients. At the ecosystem and community levels, Calcium availability is associated with community composition, mature tree growth, and ecosystem productivity. One study testing the effects of added aluminum to soil, found that P. rubens mortality rate increased under these conditions.

During the 1980s, increased acid deposition contributed to a loss of high-elevation red spruce trees caused by leached calcium and thus decreased freezing tolerance. Additionally, the structure of the spruce needle enhances the capture of water and particles, which has been shown to add to soil acidification, nutrient leaching, and forest decline. However, more recently, reductions in acid deposition have contributed to red spruce resurgence in some mountain areas in the northeastern United States. This increase in red spruce growth has been associated with an increase in rainfall pH, which reduces bulk acidic deposition. This suggests that policies aiming to reduce atmospheric pollution in this area have been effective, although other species sensitive to soil acidification, such as sugar maple, are still continuing to decline.

== Conservation ==
The red spruce has low genetic diversity as well as a narrow ecological niche, meaning the tree is easily susceptible to changes within its environment. The Central Appalachian Spruce Restoration Initiative seeks to unite diverse partners with the goal of restoring historic red spruce ecosystems across the high-elevation landscapes of central Appalachians. The partners that make up this diverse group are Appalachian Mountain Joint Venture, Appalachian Regional Reforestation Initiative, Canaan Valley National Wildlife Refuge, Natural Resources Conservation Service, The Mountain Institute, The Nature Conservancy, Trout Unlimited, U.S. Forest Service Northern Research Station, U.S. Forest Service Monongahela National Forest, West Virginia Division of Natural Resources, West Virginia Division of Forestry, West Virginia Highlands Conservancy, West Virginia State Parks, and West Virginia University.

Prior to the late 19th century, 600,000 hectares (1,500,000 acres) of red spruce were in West Virginia. In the late 19th and early 20th century, a vast amount of logging began in the state, and the number of red spruce dwindled to 12,000 hectares (30,000 acres). Silviculture is being used to help restore the population of the lost red spruce.

Significant efforts have been made to increase the growth of red spruce trees in western North Carolina, most notably by Molly Tartt on behalf of the Daughters of the American Revolution (DAR). Tartt embarked on a mission to find the lost red spruce forest that had been planted by the DAR as a memorial to the lives lost during the American Revolution. The forest, consisting of 50,000 trees was dedicated in 1940 and had until recently been forgotten until Tartt located and identified the forest near Devil's Courthouse.
