= Durbin, West Virginia =

- Town
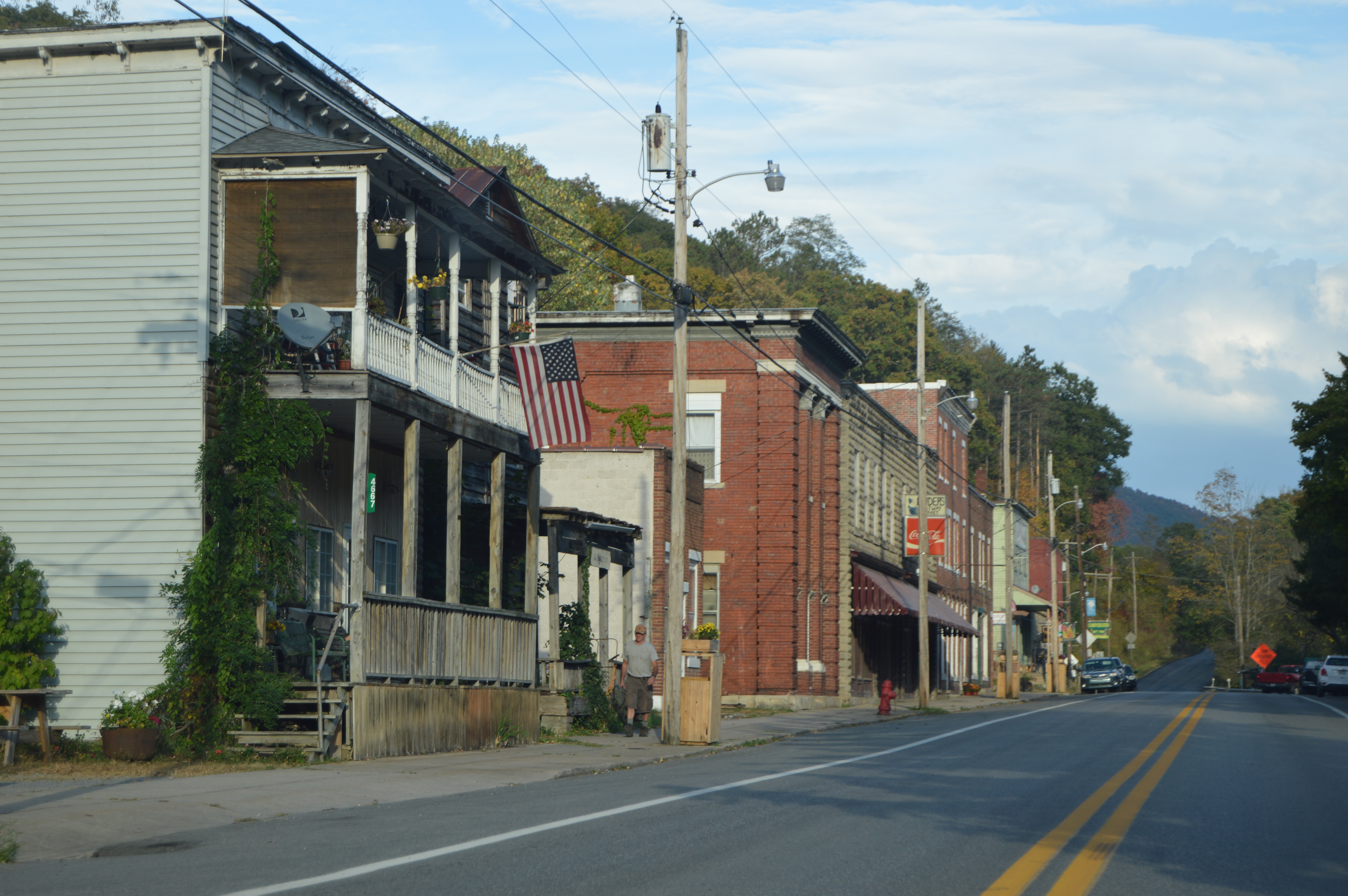
- Main Street commercial district

- Location of Durbin in Pocahontas County, West Virginia.
- Coordinates: 38°32′50″N 79°49′41″W
- Country: United States
- State: West Virginia
- County: Pocahontas

Area
  - Total: 0.57 sq mi (1.48 km^{2})
  - Land: 0.57 sq mi (1.48 km^{2})
  - Water: 0 sq mi (0.00 km^{2})
- Elevation: 2,738 ft (835 m)

Population (2020)
  - Total: 231
  - Estimate (2021): 240
  - Density: 514.0/sq mi (198.44/km^{2})
- Time zone: UTC-5 (Eastern (EST))
  - Summer (DST): UTC-4 (EDT)
- ZIP code: 26264
- Area code: 304
- FIPS code: 54-22852
- GNIS feature ID: 1550996
- Website: https://www.durbinwv.com/

Durbin is a town in Pocahontas County, West Virginia, United States. The population was 235 at the 2020 census.

The town was named in 1895 in honor of Charles R. Durbin Sr, the Grafton, WV bank official responsible for lending funds to John T. McGraw to purchase the site of the town in 1890.

== Geography ==
Durbin is nestled in the mountains of northern part of Pocahontas County near the confluence of the East and West Forks of the Greenbrier River. It is thus the starting point of the Greenbrier River proper. According to the United States Census Bureau, the town has a total area of 0.57 square miles (1.48 km^{2}), all land.

== Demographics ==
Historical population
Census	Pop.	Note	%±
1910	390		—
1920	422		8.2%
1930	498		18.0%
1940	533		7.0%
1950	540		1.3%
1960	431		−20.2%
1970	347		−19.5%
1980	379		9.2%
1990	278		−26.6%
2000	262		−5.8%
2010	293		11.8%
2020	231		−21.2%
2021 (est.)	240	▲	3.9%
U.S. Decennial Census

=== 2010 census ===
At the 2010 census there were 293 people, 124 households, and 78 families living in the town. The population density was 514.0 inhabitants per square mile (198.5/km^{2}). There were 174 housing units at an average density of 305.3 per square mile (117.9/km^{2}). The racial makeup of the town was 96.9% White, 0.3% Native American, 2.0% from other races, and 0.7% from two or more races. Hispanic or Latino of any race were 3.8%.

Of the 124 households 29.0% had children under the age of 18 living with them, 48.4% were married couples living together, 8.9% had a female householder with no husband present, 5.6% had a male householder with no wife present, and 37.1% were non-families. 30.6% of households were one person and 17.7% were one person aged 65 or older. The average household size was 2.36 and the average family size was 2.90.

The median age in the town was 45.1 years. 20.8% of residents were under the age of 18; 6.2% were between the ages of 18 and 24; 22.8% were from 25 to 44; 28.7% were from 45 to 64; and 21.5% were 65 or older. The gender makeup of the town was 50.2% male and 49.8% female.

=== 2000 census ===
At the 2000 census there were 262 people, 117 households, and 71 families living in the town. The population density was 443.7 inhabitants per square mile (171.5/km^{2}). There were 169 housing units at an average density of 286.2 per square mile (110.6/km^{2}). The racial makeup of the town was 98.85% White, 0.76% African American and 0.38% Asian. Of the 117 households 27.4% had children under the age of 18 living with them, 48.7% were married couples living together, 6.8% had a female householder with no husband present, and 38.5% were non-families. 32.5% of households were one person and 17.9% were one person aged 65 or older. The average household size was 2.24 and the average family size was 2.83.

The age distribution was 22.5% under the age of 18, 7.6% from 18 to 24, 25.6% from 25 to 44, 25.2% from 45 to 64, and 19.1% 65 or older. The median age was 39 years. For every 100 females, there were 97.0 males. For every 100 females age 18 and over, there were 95.2 males.

The median household income was $23,462 and the median family income was $25,909. Males had a median income of $21,250 versus $14,773 for females. The per capita income for the town was $10,937. About 19.4% of families and 22.5% of the population were below the poverty line, including 34.4% of those under the age of eighteen and 22.2% of those sixty five or over.

== See also ==
- https://www.hikethealleghenytrail.org/ The Allegheny Trail is West Virginia's longest hiking trail at 311 miles. Durbin, WV is the town closest to the center of the trail and offer several amenities for hikers, bikers, hunters, anglers and equestrians alike.
- Gaudineer Scenic Area, a nearby stand of virgin forest about 5 miles from Durbin
- Durbin and Greenbrier Valley Railroad, a tourist railroad which operates scenic excursions. The D&GVRR Greenbrier Express excursion runs to Durbin, with a lunch layover, then returns to Cass WV.
- Durbin is the beginning of the 22 mile West Fork Rail Trail that ends in Glady, WV.
