= List of things named after Henry Clay =

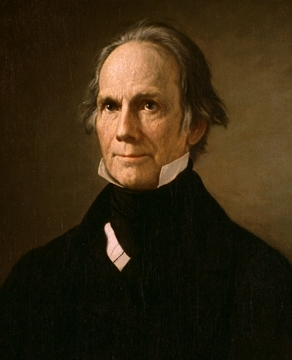
Henry Clay

The following is a list of things named after Henry Clay, including monuments and memorials in his honor.

== Roads ==
- Henry Clay Avenue in New Orleans
- Henry Clay Boulevard and Clay Avenue in Lexington, Kentucky
- Henry Clay Boulevard in Ashland, Missouri
- Clay Streets in numerous cities, including New Haven, Connecticut, Richmond, Virginia, Vicksburg, Mississippi, and Whitefish Bay, Wisconsin.
- Ashland Ave. in Chicago, Illinois; Ashland, Virginia, Ashland County in Ohio and Wisconsin were named for his estate, as were the cities of Ashland in Kentucky, Alabama, and Pennsylvania.
- Henry Clay Court in The Landings on Skidaway Island, Georgia

== Towns ==
- Ashland, Missouri, was named after Clay's Lexington, Kentucky estate, as was Ashland, Massachusetts.
- Clay, New York, Onondaga County, including the road Henry Clay Boulevard
- Clay, Kentucky, western Kentucky
- Clay, West Virginia
- Clay City, Indiana
- Henry Clay Village, or Breck's Mill Area, on the left bank of Brandywine Creek in Wilmington, Delaware, factory and mill workers' residences
- The town of Claysburg, Pennsylvania
- Clay, New York, a suburb of Syracuse
- Clayville, New York, a town named after Clay during the late 1800s, a highly popular area with mills and factories
- Clayville, Illinois, an active settlement during the statesman's life
- Claysville, Alabama
- Clay-Ashland, Liberia, named after Henry Clay and his estate

== Counties ==
- Sixteen Clay counties in the United States, in Alabama, Florida, Georgia, Illinois, Indiana, Kansas, Kentucky, Minnesota, Mississippi, Missouri, Nebraska, North Carolina, South Dakota, Tennessee, Texas, and West Virginia. (Clay County, Iowa, is named for his son Henry Clay Jr.)

== Monuments ==
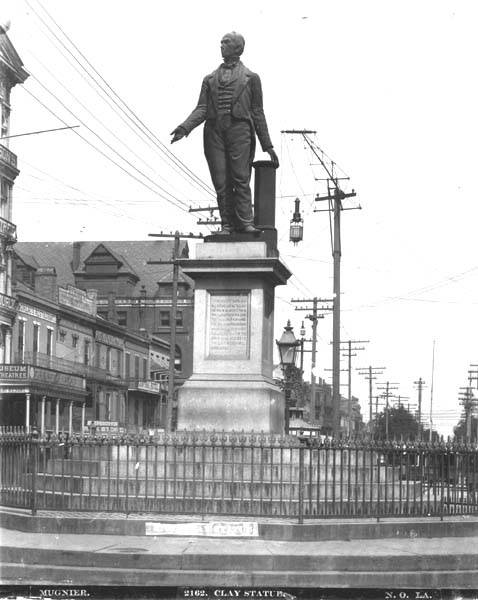
- Henry Clay Monument in New Orleans ca.1890
  Memorial column and statue at his tomb in Lexington, Kentucky
- Statue of Clay in the National Statuary Hall Collection, Capitol, Washington D.C.
- Henry Clay statue and portrait in Virginia State Capitol in Richmond, Virginia
- Henry Clay Monument in Pottsville, Pennsylvania
- In New Orleans, a 20-foot-tall monument was erected in 1860 at Canal Street and St. Charles Avenue/Royal Street, and moved to the center of Lafayette Square in 1901.
- Clay is one of the many senators honored with a cenotaph in the Congressional Cemetery.

== Schools ==
- Clay Elementary in Rolando, San Diego
- Clay High School in South Bend, Indiana
- Henry Clay Elementary School in the Hegewisch neighborhood in Chicago
- Henry Clay Elementary School in his birthplace Ashland, Virginia.
- Henry Clay High School in Lexington, Kentucky,
- Henry Clay Middle School in Los Angeles
- Henry Clay School in Whitefish Bay, Wisconsin
- The Instituto Educacional Henry Clay in Caracas, Venezuela, a bilingual private school
- The Clay Dormitory at Transylvania University in Lexington, Kentucky

== Parks ==
- Clay Neighborhood Park in Rolando, San Diego, renamed in 2025 to Dr. Bertha O. Pendleton Park.
- In 2020, a Henry Clay Park in Arlington, Virginia, was renamed Zitkala-Ša Park during a wave of name changes in the aftermath of the murder of George Floyd.
- Cooper's Rock State Forest in West Virginia features a preserved nineteenth century iron furnace named in commemoration of Henry Clay.
- Henry Clay Ball Fields in Ashland, Virginia, used by Ashland Little League.

== Other ==
- Mount Clay in the Presidential Range of New Hampshire, since renamed Mount Reagan by the state legislature but not by the federal Board on Geographic Names
- The Lafayette class submarine USS Henry Clay (SSBN-625)
- The USS Ashland (LSD-1) and USS Ashland (LSD-48), named for his estate
- Between 1870 and 1908, Clay was included appeared on American definitive postage stamps: he appeared on the 12¢ denomination in the issues of 1870, 1873 and 1879 and on the 15¢ denomination in the issues of 1890, 1894, 1898 and 1902. He has since been honored by the United States Postal Service with a 3¢ Great Americans series postage stamp.
- The Henry Clay, an historic residential building in downtown Louisville, Kentucky, formerly the city's YWCA building.

== Gallery ==
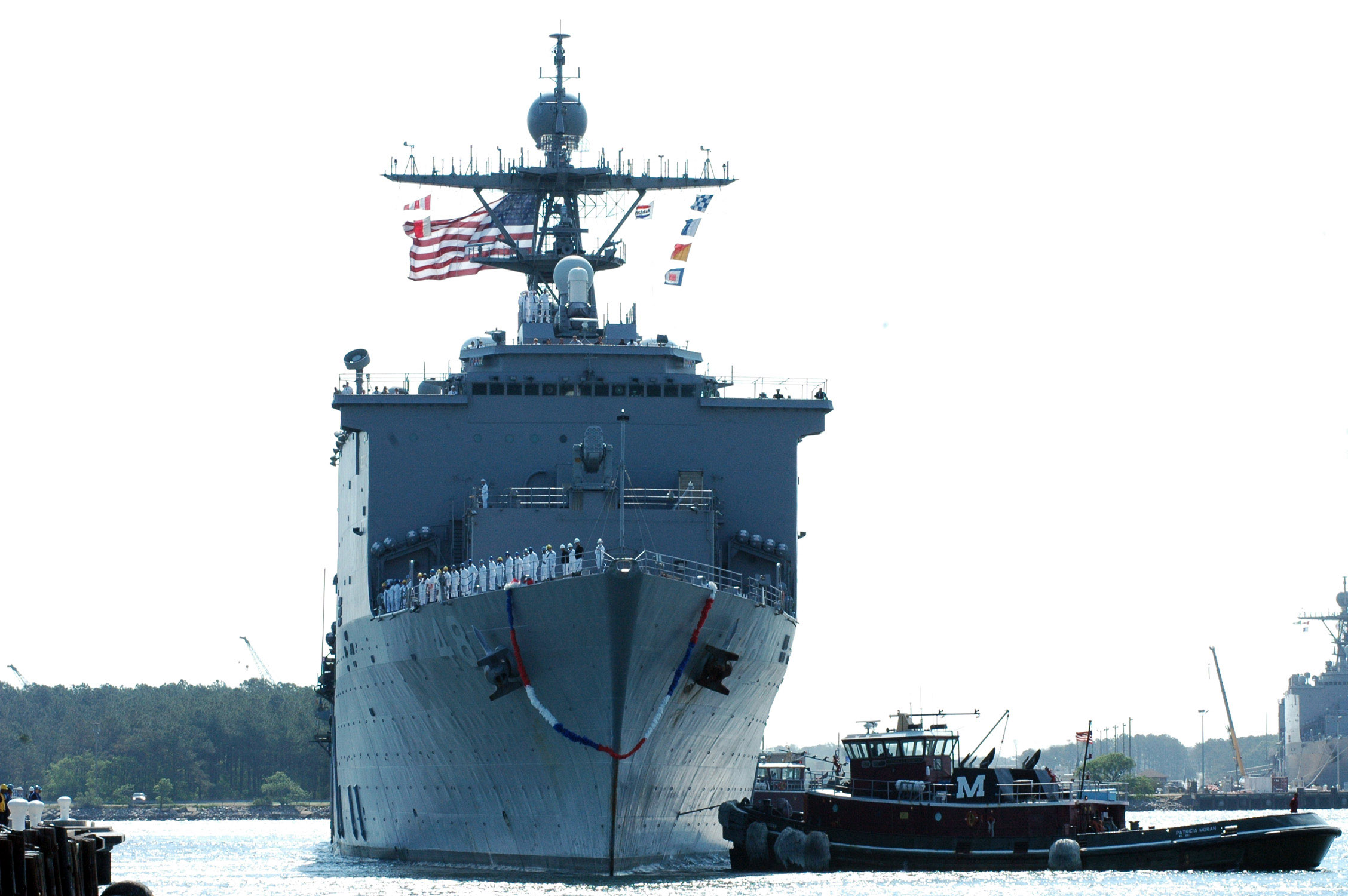
USS Ashland

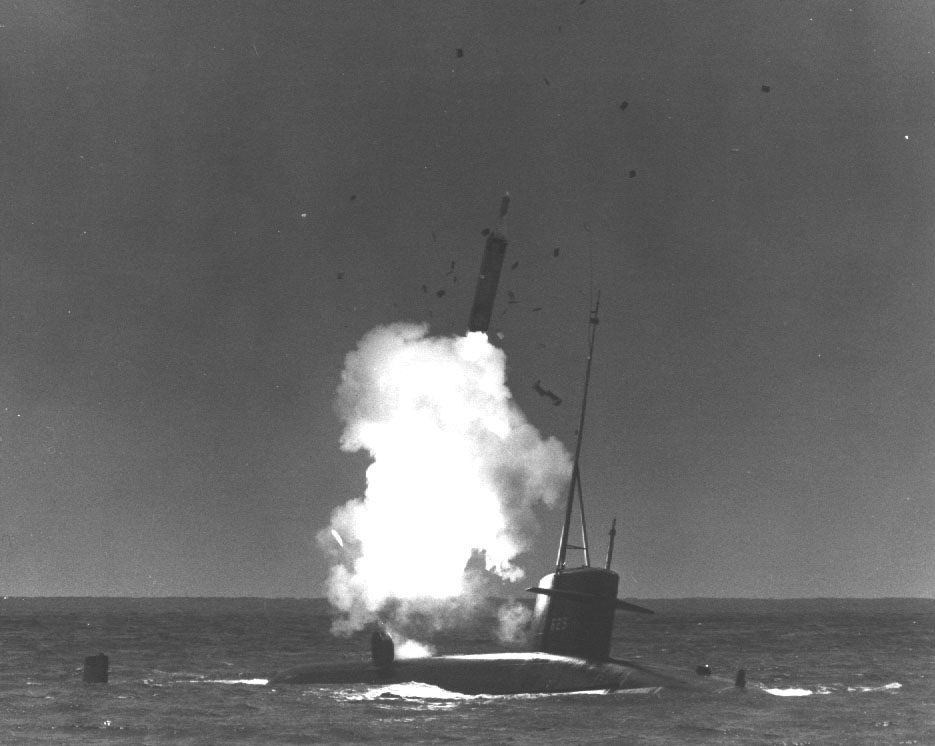
USS Henry Clay, a submarine

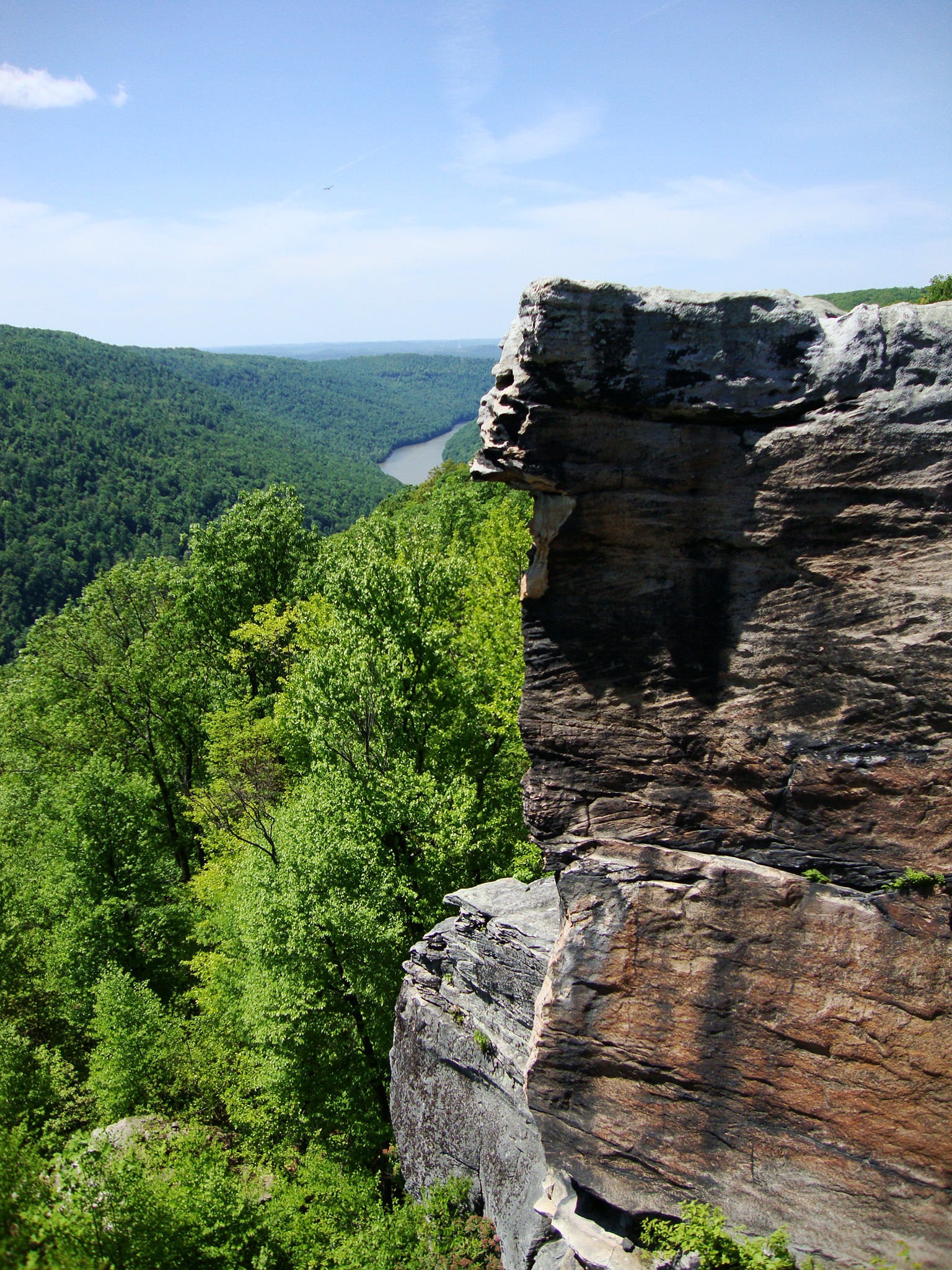
Cooper's Rock State Forest

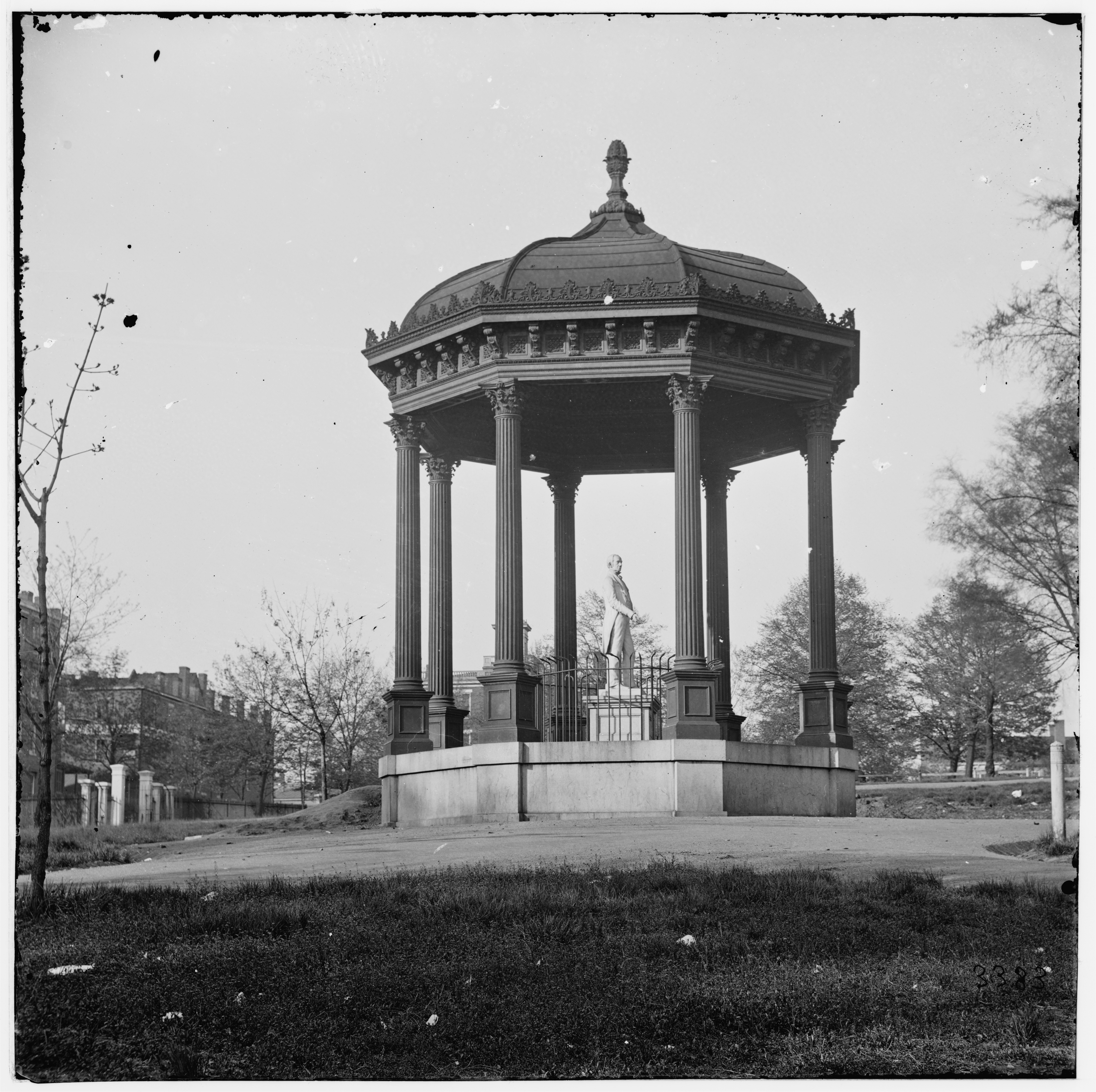
Henry Clay Monument, Richmond, Virginia

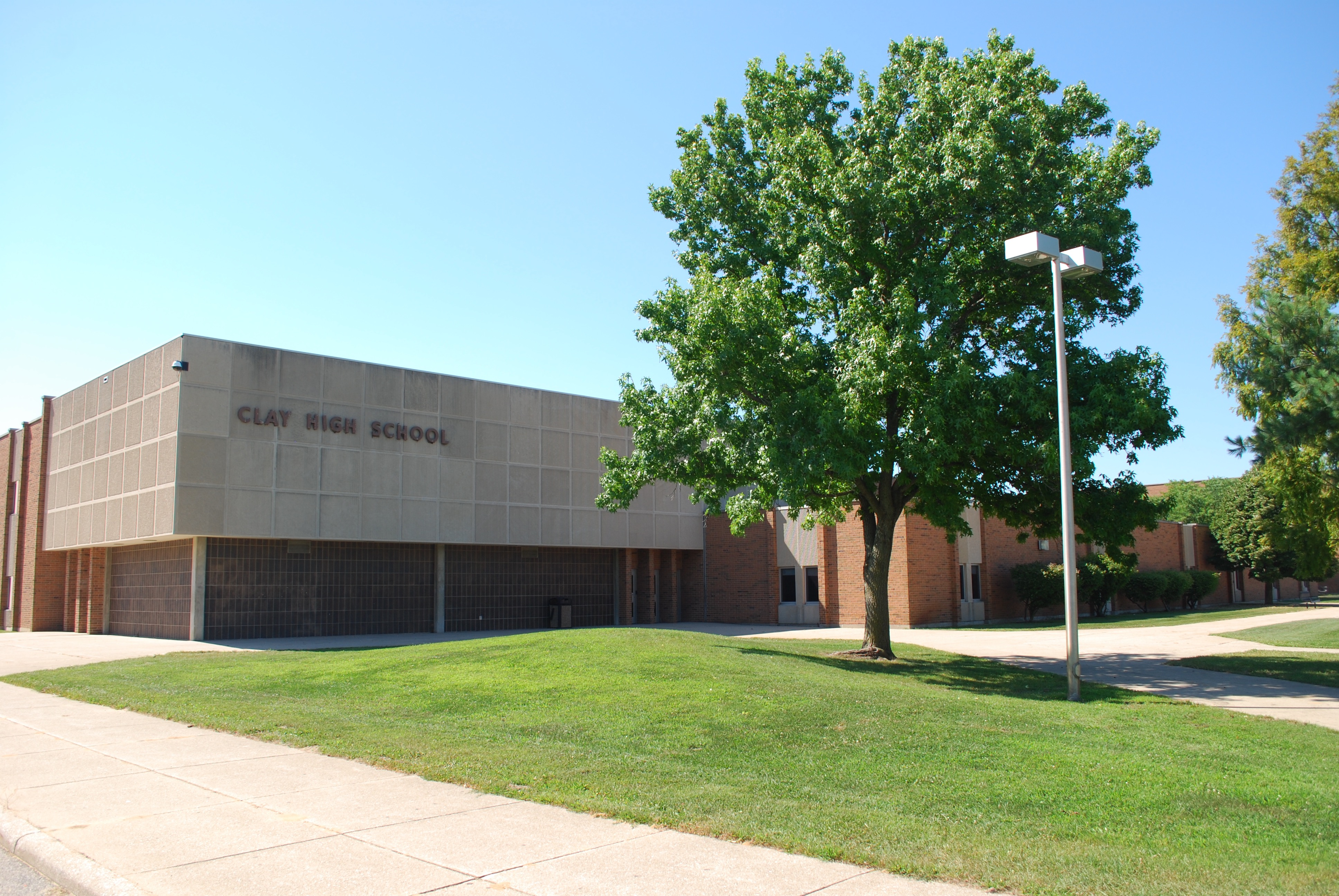
Clay High School, South Bend, Indiana

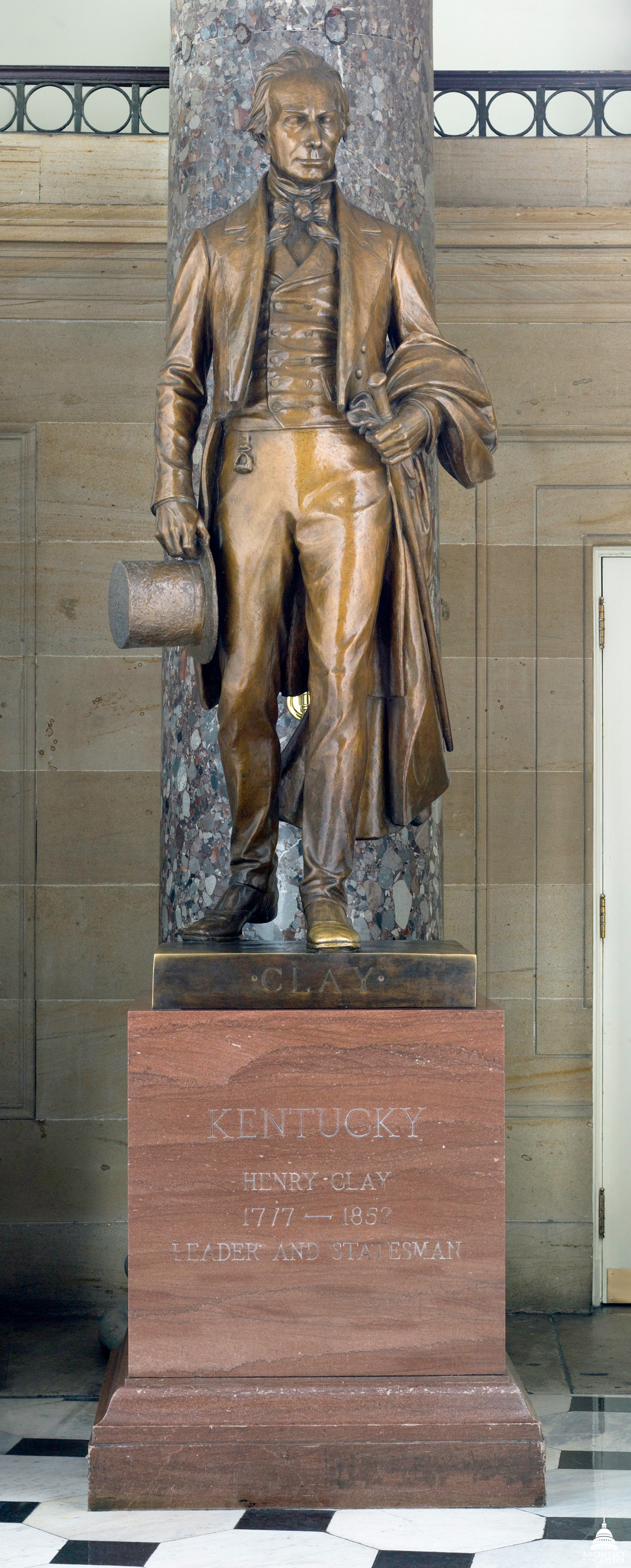
Henry Clay Sculpture

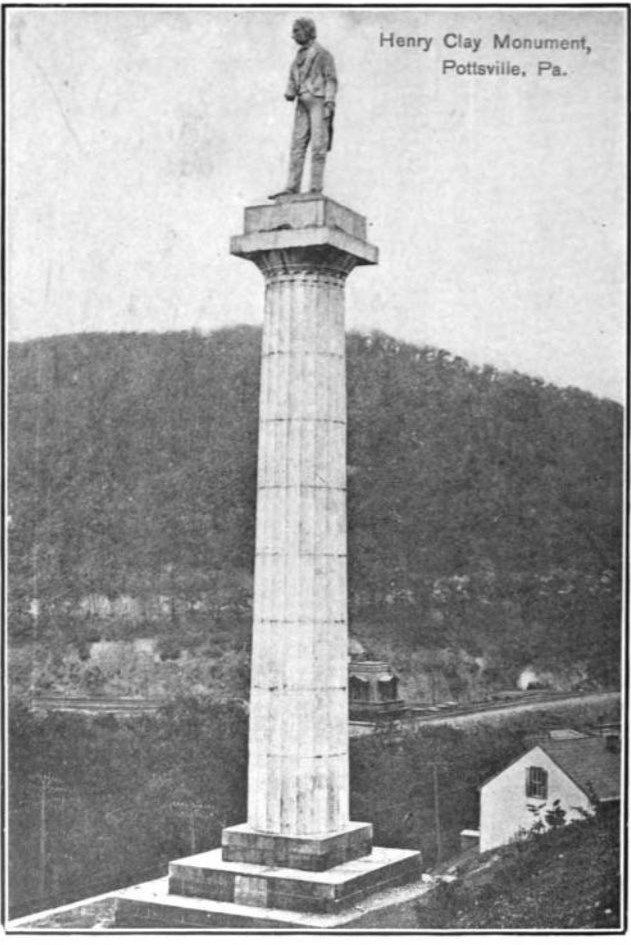
Henry Clay Monument, Pottsville, Pennsylvania, circa 1910

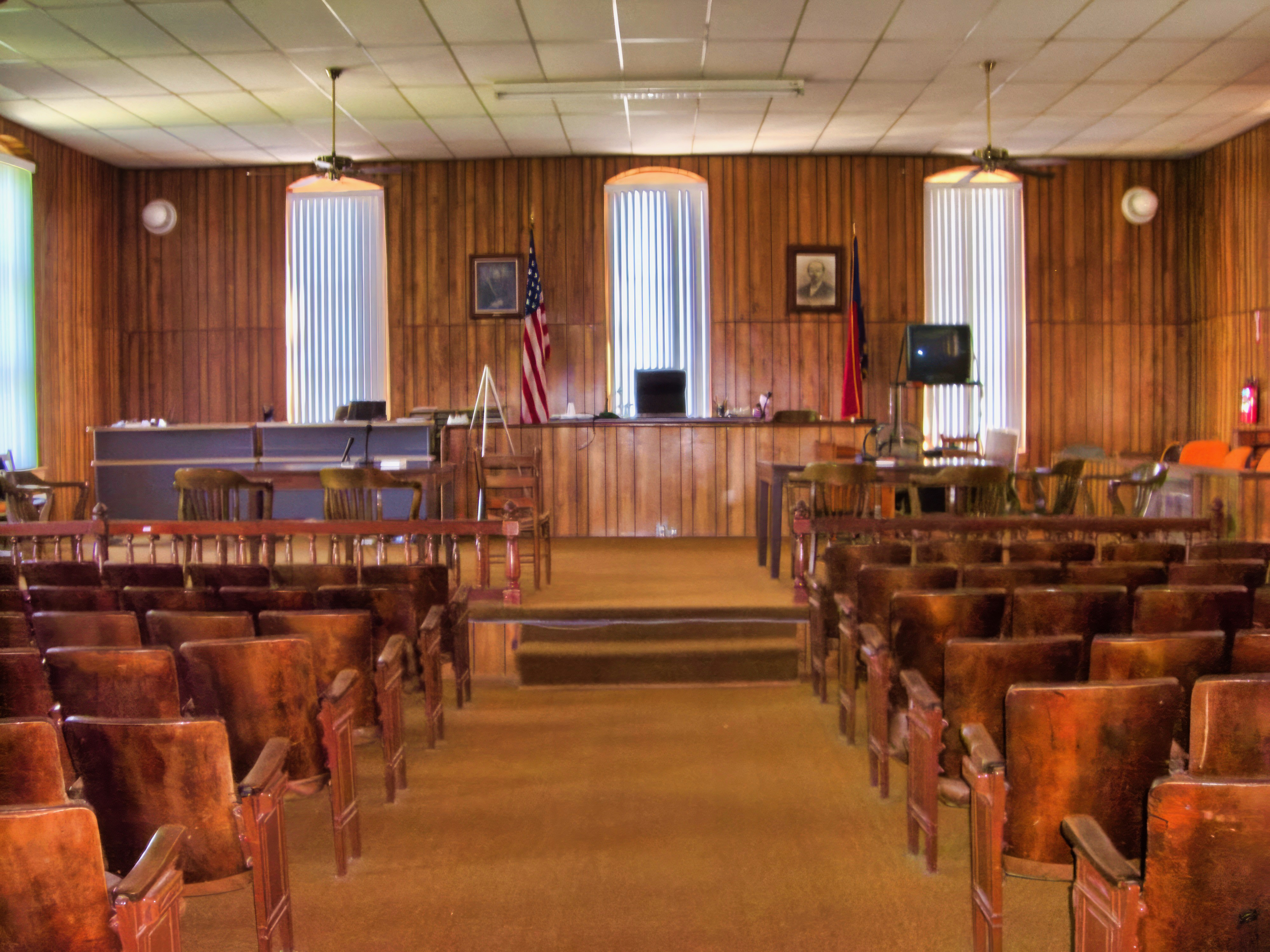
Clay County Courthouse, North Carolina

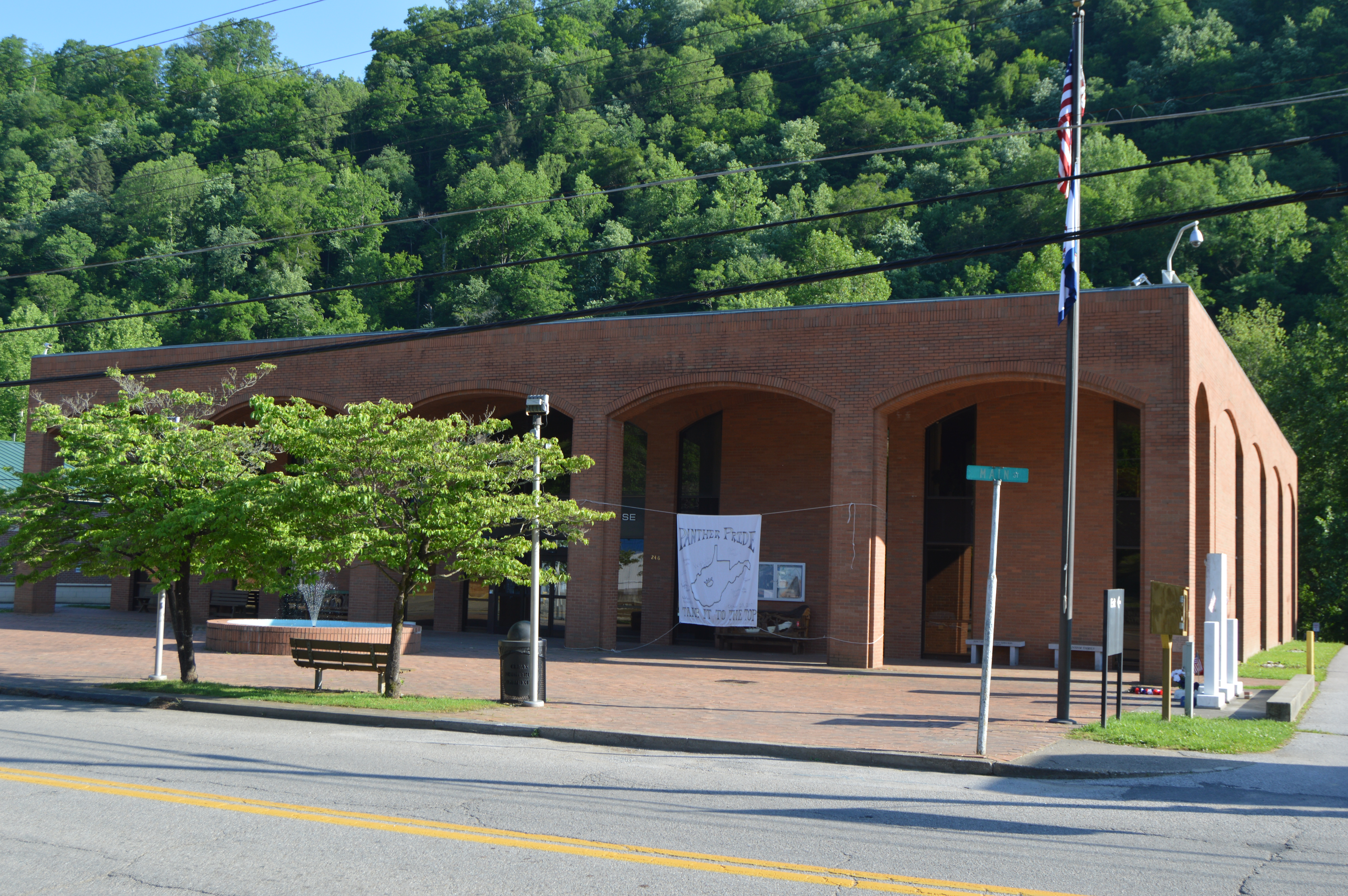
Clay County Courthouse, West Virginia

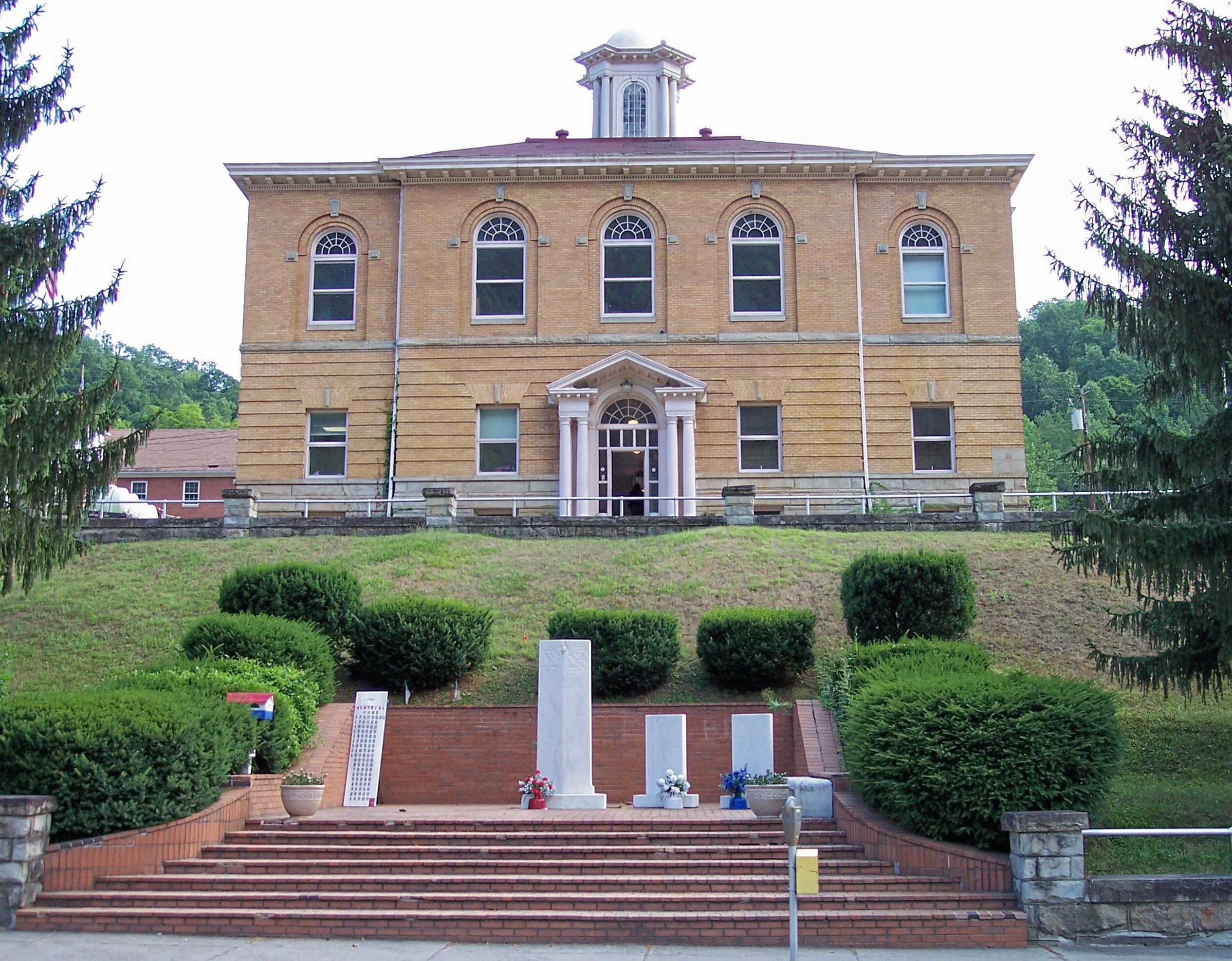
Clay County Courthouse, West Virginia

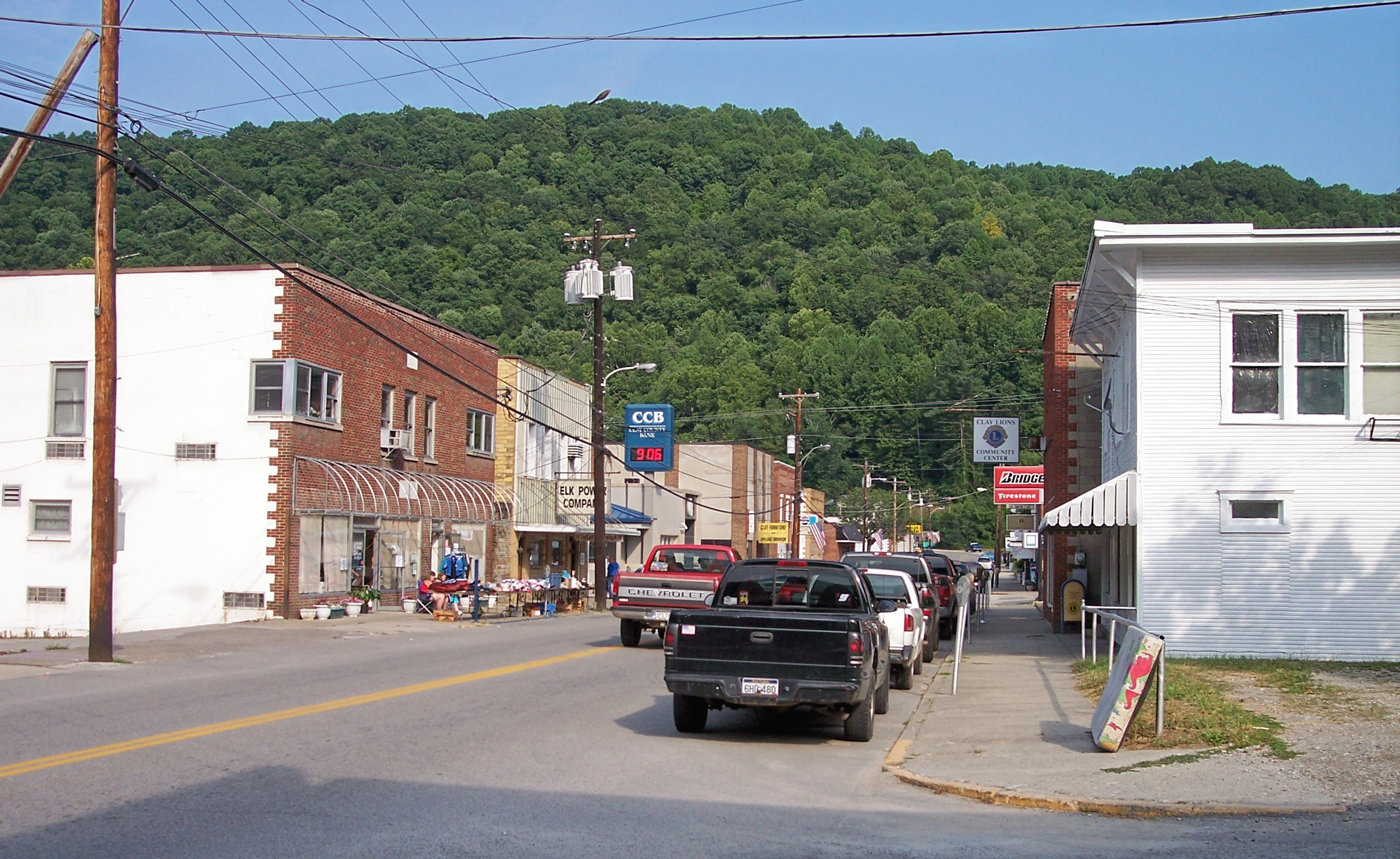
Clay, West Virginia

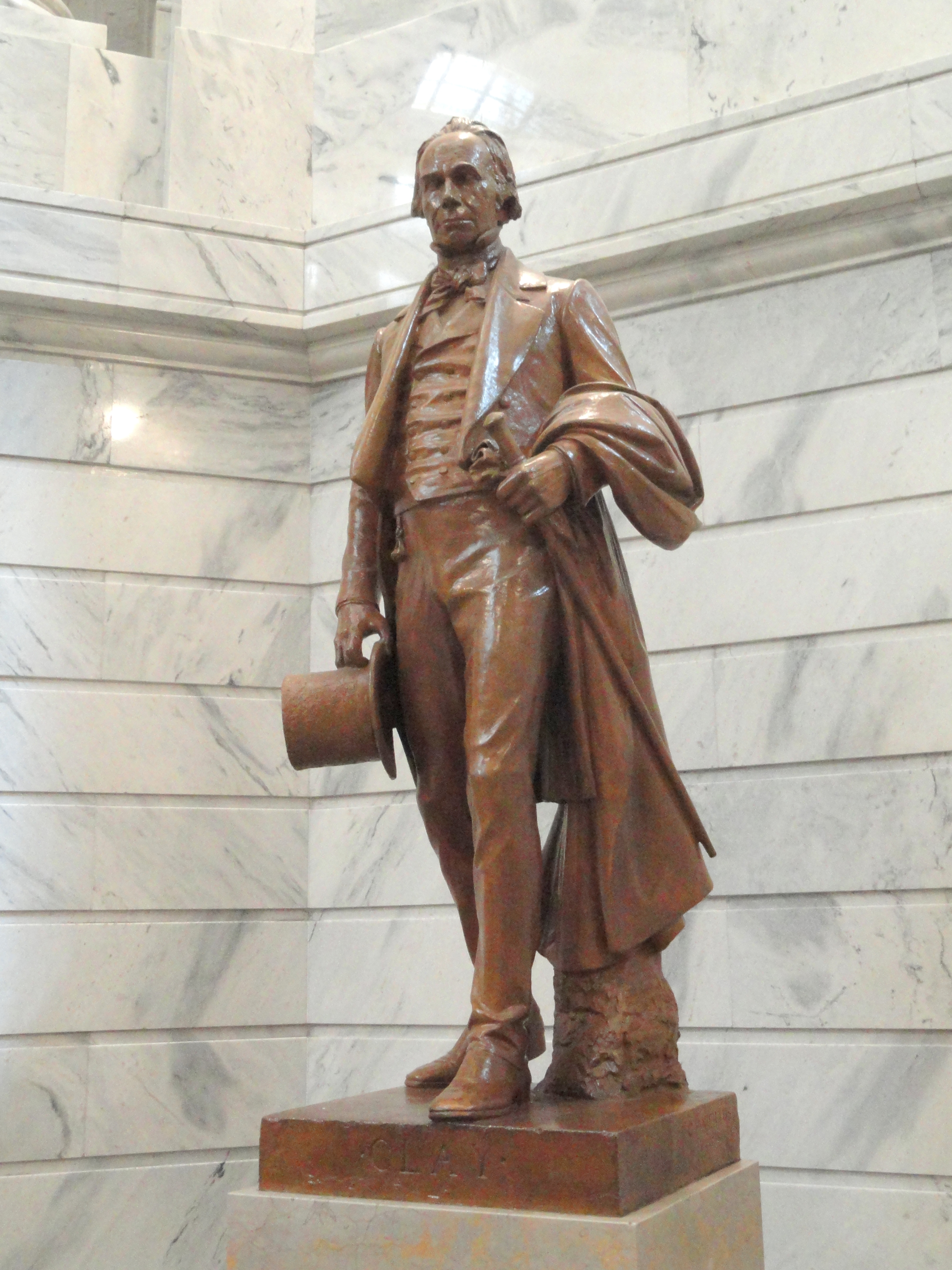
Henry Clay Statue, Kentucky State Capitol

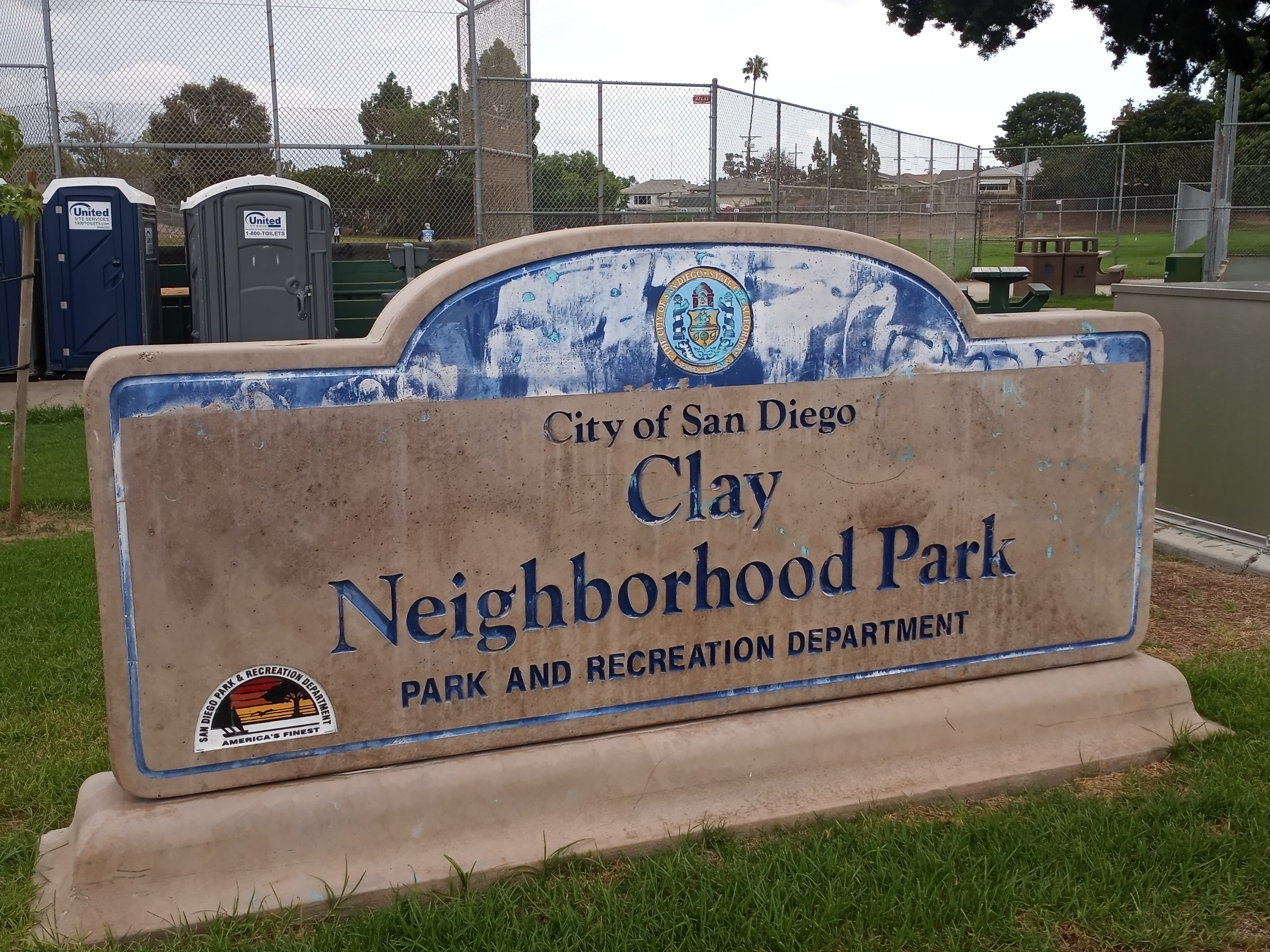
Clay Neighborhood Park in San Diego

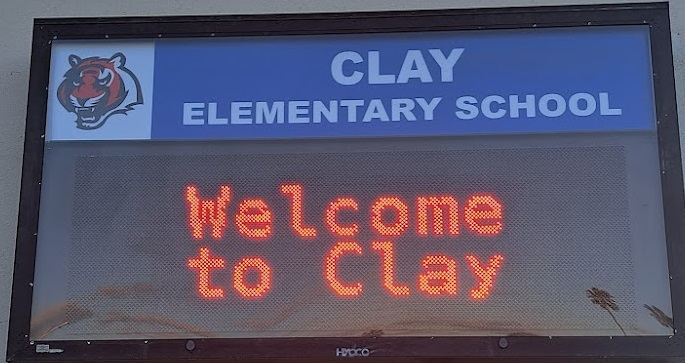
Clay Elementary School in San Diego
