= Cheat Lake, West Virginia =

Place in West Virginia, U.S.

- Census-designated place
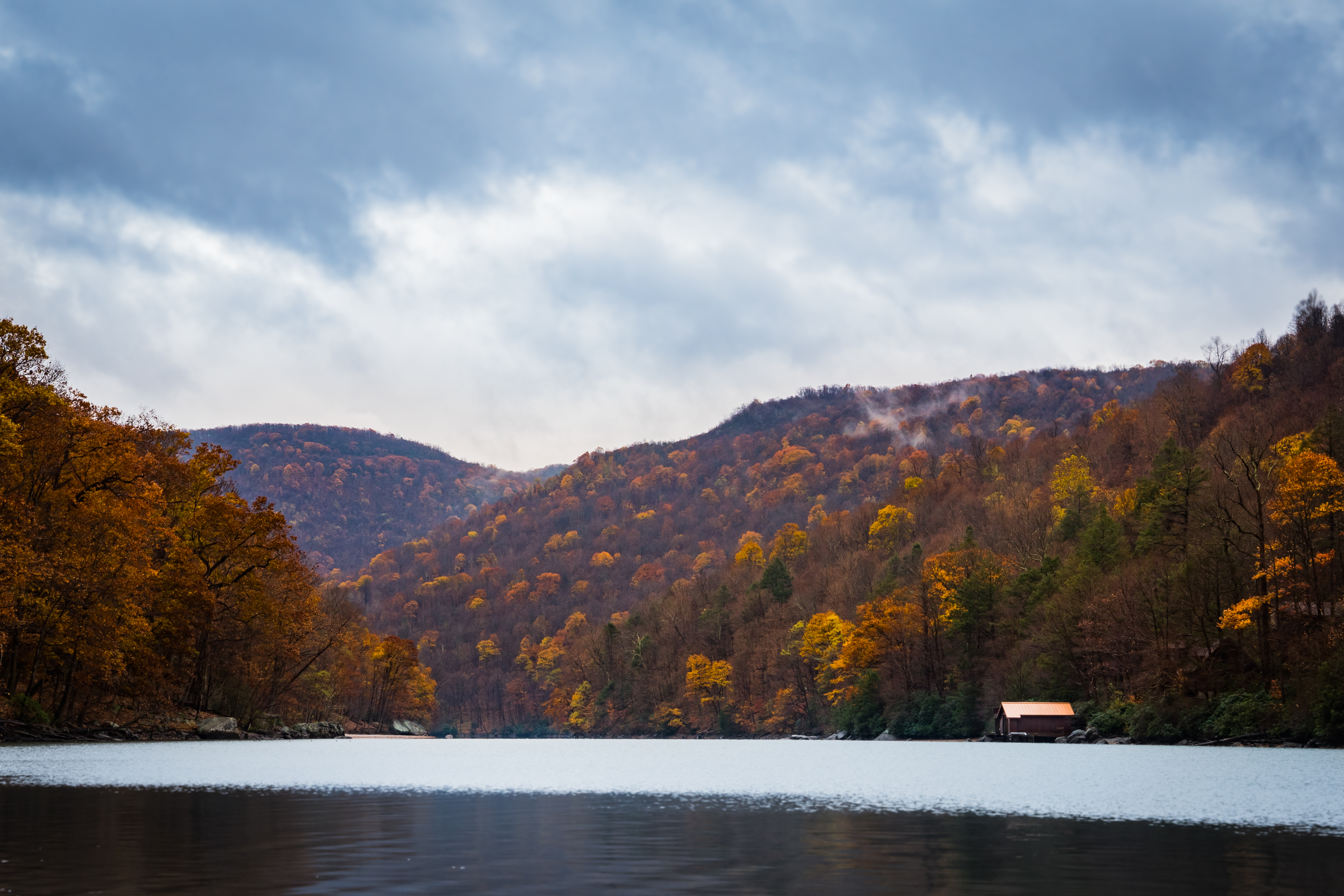
- Cheat Lake

- Location within the state of West Virginia Location within the United States
- Coordinates: 39°40′0″N 79°51′10″W
- Country: United States
- State: West Virginia
- County: Monongalia

Area
  - Total: 15.8 sq mi (41.0 km^{2})
  - Land: 14.3 sq mi (37.1 km^{2})
  - Water: 1.5 sq mi (3.9 km^{2})
- Elevation: 997 ft (304 m)

Population (2020)
  - Total: 9,930
  - Density: 693/sq mi (268/km^{2})
- Time zone: UTC-5 (Eastern (EST))
  - Summer (DST): UTC-4 (EDT)
- ZIP codes: 26507-26508
- Area code: 304
- FIPS code: 54-14775
- GNIS feature ID: 1867648

Cheat Lake is a census-designated place in Monongalia County, West Virginia, United States, surrounding the Cheat Lake reservoir. The population was 9,930 at the 2020 census. It is included in the Morgantown metropolitan area.

== Geography ==
Cheat Lake is located at 39°40′0″N 79°51′10″W (39.666538, -79.852683).

According to the United States Census Bureau, the Cheat Lake CDP has a total area of 15.8 square miles (41 km^{2}), of which 14.3 square miles (37 km^{2}) is land and 1.5 square miles (3.9 km^{2}) (10.3%) is water.

== Demographics ==
Historical population
Census	Pop.	Note	%±
2000	6,396		—
2010	7,988		24.9%
2020	9,930		24.3%
U.S. Decennial Census

=== 2020 census ===
As of the 2020 census, there were 9,930 people, 3,923 households, and 2,981 families residing in the community. The population density was 694.4 people per square mile (268.1/km^{2}). There were 4,380 housing units at an average density of 306.3 per square mile (118.3/km^{2}).

The racial makeup of the community was 89.4% White, 3.4% African American, 0.1% Native American, 2.1% Asian, 0.0% Pacific Islander, 1.3% other races, and 3.7% from two or more races. Hispanic or Latino of any race were 3.6% of the population.

There were 3,923 households, out of which 28.4% had children under the age of 18 living with them, 65.5% were married couples living together, 7.2% had a female householder with no spouse present, and 24.0% were non-families. 20.1% of all households were made up of individuals, and 7.4% had someone living alone who was 65 years of age or older. The average household size was 2.53 and the average family size was 2.94.

The age distribution of the community was 21.6% under the age of 18, 6.4% from 18 to 24, 25.1% from 25 to 44, 31.4% from 45 to 64, and 15.5% who were 65 years of age or older. The median age was 40.6 years. For every 100 females, there were 95.8 males. For every 100 females age 18 and over, there were 94.1 males.

The median income for a household in the community was $117,143, and the median income for a family was $146,801. Males had median year-round earnings of $96,750 versus $61,714 for females. The per capita income for the community was $60,256. About 2.2% of families and 3.4% of the population were below the poverty line, including 2.5% of those under age 18 and 3.9% of those age 65 or over.

Racial composition as of the 2020 census
Race	Number	Percent
White	8,791	88.5%
Black or African American	176	1.8%
American Indian and Alaska Native	13	0.1%
Asian	274	2.8%
Native Hawaiian and Other Pacific Islander	3	0.0%
Some other race	70	0.7%
Two or more races	603	6.1%
Hispanic or Latino (of any race)	271	2.7%

=== 2000 census ===
As of the census of 2000, there were 6,396 people, 2,511 households, and 1,822 families residing in the community. The population density was 442.9 people per square mile (171.0 people/km^{2}). There were 2,802 housing units at an average density of 194.0 per square mile (74.9/km^{2}). The racial makeup of the community was 95.61% White, 1.20% African American, 0.09% Native American, 1.88% Asian, 0.08% Pacific Islander, 0.05% from other races, and 1.09% from two or more races. Hispanic or Latino of any race were 0.55% of the population.

There were 2,511 households, out of which 35.4% had children under the age of 18 living with them, 63.8% were married couples living together, 6.6% had a female householder with no husband present, and 27.4% were non-families. 23.3% of all households were made up of individuals, and 5.9% had someone living alone who was 65 years of age or older. The average household size was 2.55 and the average family size was 3.03.

The age distribution of the community is 25.8% under the age of 18, 7.3% from 18 to 24, 30.1% from 25 to 44, 27.7% from 45 to 64, and 9.1% who were 65 years of age or older. The median age was 38 years. For every 100 females, there were 98.0 males. For every 100 females age 18 and over, there were 96.3 males.

The median income for a household in the community was $48,594, and the median income for a family was $58,778. Males had a median income of $48,661 versus $28,920 for females. The per capita income for the community was $30,210. About 4.8% of families and 6.0% of the population were below the poverty line, including 6.7% of those under age 18 and 3.2% of those age 65 or over.

=== Income and poverty ===
The median income for a household in the community was $117,143, and the median income for a family was $146,801. Males had a median year-round earnings of $96,750 versus $61,714 for females. The per capita income for the community was $60,256. About 2.2% of families and 3.4% of the population were below the poverty line, including 2.5% of those under age 18 and 3.9% of those age 65 or over.

== See also ==
- Cheat Lake – The lake that was formed in the 1920s as a result of damming the Cheat River.
- Coopers Rock State Forest – A State Forest next to Cheat Lake that provides many outdoor activities such as hiking.
- Snake Hill Wildlife Management Area – State Area in the Cheat Lake area that provides hiking, hunting and views of the Cheat Lake area.
