= Henry Clay Furnace =

- U.S. National Register of Historic Places
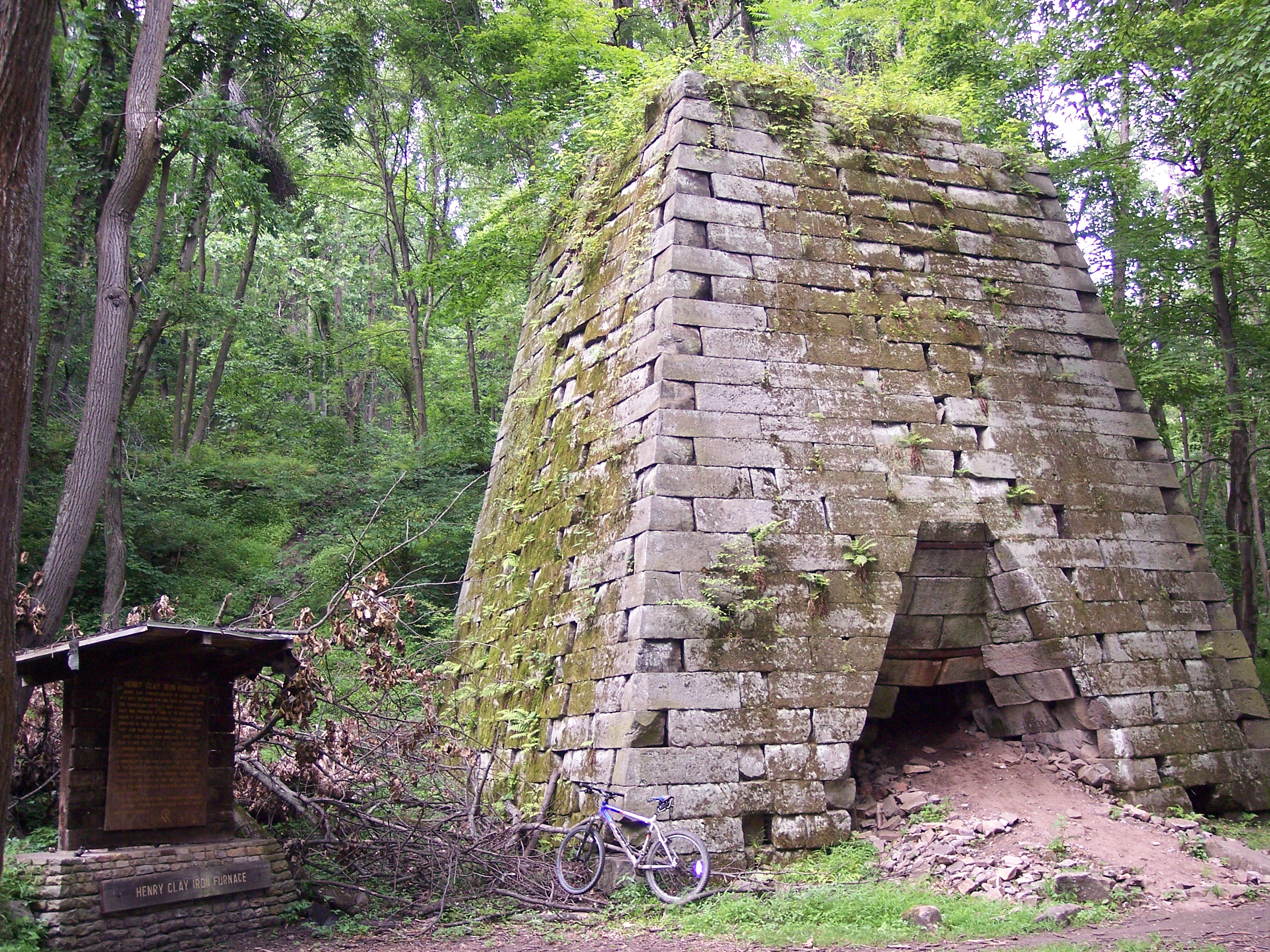

- Location within West Virginia Location within the United States
- Location: Southeast of Cheat Neck in Coopers Rock State Forest, near Cheat Neck, West Virginia
- Coordinates: 39°38′56″N 79°49′7″W
- Area: 3.6 acres (1.5 ha)
- Built: 1834
- Built by: Leonard Lamb
- NRHP reference No.: 70000658
- Added to NRHP: January 26, 1970

Henry Clay Furnace is an historic iron furnace located in Cooper's Rock State Forest near Cheat Neck, Monongalia County, West Virginia. It was built between 1834 and 1836 by Leonard Lamb. It is a 30-foot square, 30 feet high stone structure in the shape of a truncated pyramid. It was the first steam-powered blast furnace to be built in Western Virginia and had a capacity to produce 4 tons of pig iron per day. In 1839 it was sold to the Ellicott Brothers, who also purchased the Jackson Ironworks at the same time. They made significant improvements, such as connecting it via tram lines to their ironworks at Ices Ferry. It supported a community of approximately 100 people (some sources say as many as 500 people with 100 dwellings). The small settlement included a school, store and a church. No structures apart from the furnace exist today. It is believed to have ceased production in 1847-48 when the Ellicott's business failed. The furnace may have continued to operate until 1868 when all the Cheat River iron works ceased production. It is among the ten or more abandoned iron furnaces still existing in northern West Virginia.

It was listed on the National Register of Historic Places in 1970.
