= Katie Fallon =

American writer

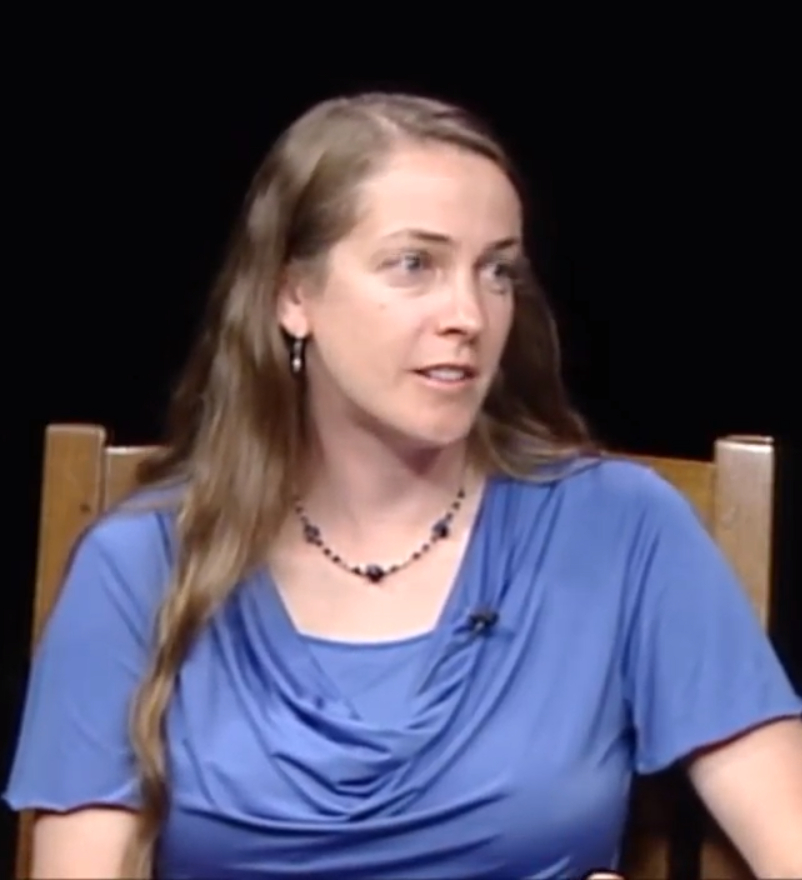
- Born: October 25, 1976 (age 49); Wilkes-Barre, PA, United States
- Occupations: Non-fiction writer, essayist
- Writing career
- Genres: literary nonfiction, nature writing

Kathleen "Katie" Fallon (born October 25, 1976) is an American non-fiction author and essayist. Her essays have appeared in numerous literary journals, both electronic and print, and received several accolades. In 2011, she published her first book, Cerulean Blues: A Personal Search for a Vanishing Songbird. She currently resides in Cheat Neck, WV with her husband Jesse, where she teaches creative writing at nearby West Virginia University. Much of Fallon's writing is grounded in naturalism and conservation efforts, especially concerning raptors and other birds.

== Personal life ==
Fallon was born in Wilkes-Barre, Pennsylvania and grew up in Dallas, Pennsylvania. Both her parents were public school teachers. Her family has a long coal-mining heritage in both Pennsylvania and West Virginia. Fallon founded the Avian Conservation Center of Appalachia, Inc., a nonprofit organization dedicated to conserving wild birds through scientific research, public outreach, rescue and rehabilitation. She and her veterinarian husband live with their three children.

== Education ==
Fallon began her undergraduate studies as a Wildlife and Fisheries Science major at Pennsylvania State University, and soon switched to English. She received her MFA in Creative Nonfiction from West Virginia University.

== Career and work ==
Fallon taught English at Virginia Tech, West Virginia University, West Virginia Wesleyan University, and Chatham University. Numerous published essays of hers have won awards and nominations, including several nominations for the Pushcart Prize. She has published two books, titled Cerulean Blues: A Personal Search for a Vanishing Songbird and Vulture: The Private Life of an Unloved Bird. Among other nature writers, she cites Edward Abbey and Terry Tempest Williams as influences.

== Awards and nominations ==
- Reed Award for Outstanding Writing on the Southern Environment finalist
- “Hill of the Sacred Eagles,” finalist in Terrain‘s 2011 essay contest
- The Tusculum Review’s Featured Artist in November 2011
- "The Bottom Field," finalist in Phoebe's 2013 nonfiction contest
- "Rebirth" listed as "Notable" in Best American Science and Nature Writing, 2014

== Works ==
=== Books ===
- Cerulean Blues: A Personal Search for a Vanishing Songbird (Ruka Press, November 2011)
- Vulture: The Private Life of an Unloved Bird (ForeEdge, March 2017, Brandeis University Press, 2020)

=== Essays ===
- Touchstone, “Cave Darkness.” 2001.
- Fourth Genre, “With Hurt Hawks." 2006.
- Ecotone, "Ghosts in the Woodshed." 2006.
- Appalachian Heritage, “Morning Glories.” 2005.
- Fourth River, “Lost.” 2007.
- Rivendell, “Away from Home.” 2007.
- Now & Then, “Goose.” 2008.
- Pine Mountain Sand & Gravel, “Fall Migration.” 2009.
- Isotope, “The Youngest Eagle.” 2010.
- Terrain, "Hill of the Sacred Eagles." 2011.
- New River Gorge Adventure Guide, “Losing Ground.” 2011.
- Bark Magazine, “An Ear to Stroke: Throwaway Dogs Provide Comfort during Frightening Times." 2011.
- The Tusculum Review, "Grave Robbers." 2012.
- River Teeth, “Rebirth,” 2013, and "The Vulture Tree," 2005.
- The Minnesota Review, "Solitaire." 2013.
