= Erwin, West Virginia =

Unincorporated community in West Virginia, United States

Erwin
- Unincorporated community
- Location within the state of West Virginia Erwin (the United States)
- Coordinates: 39°17′47″N 79°38′18″W
- Country: United States
- State: West Virginia
- County: Preston
- Time zone: UTC-5 (Eastern (EST))
  - Summer (DST): UTC-4 (EDT)
- GNIS feature ID: 1551066

Erwin is an unincorporated community in Preston County, West Virginia, United States. Erwin is located on the east bank of the Cheat River near its confluence with Wolf Creek. Erwin lies along the George Washington Highway (U.S. Route 50).
