= Camp Rhododendron =

- U.S. National Register of Historic Places
- U.S. Historic district
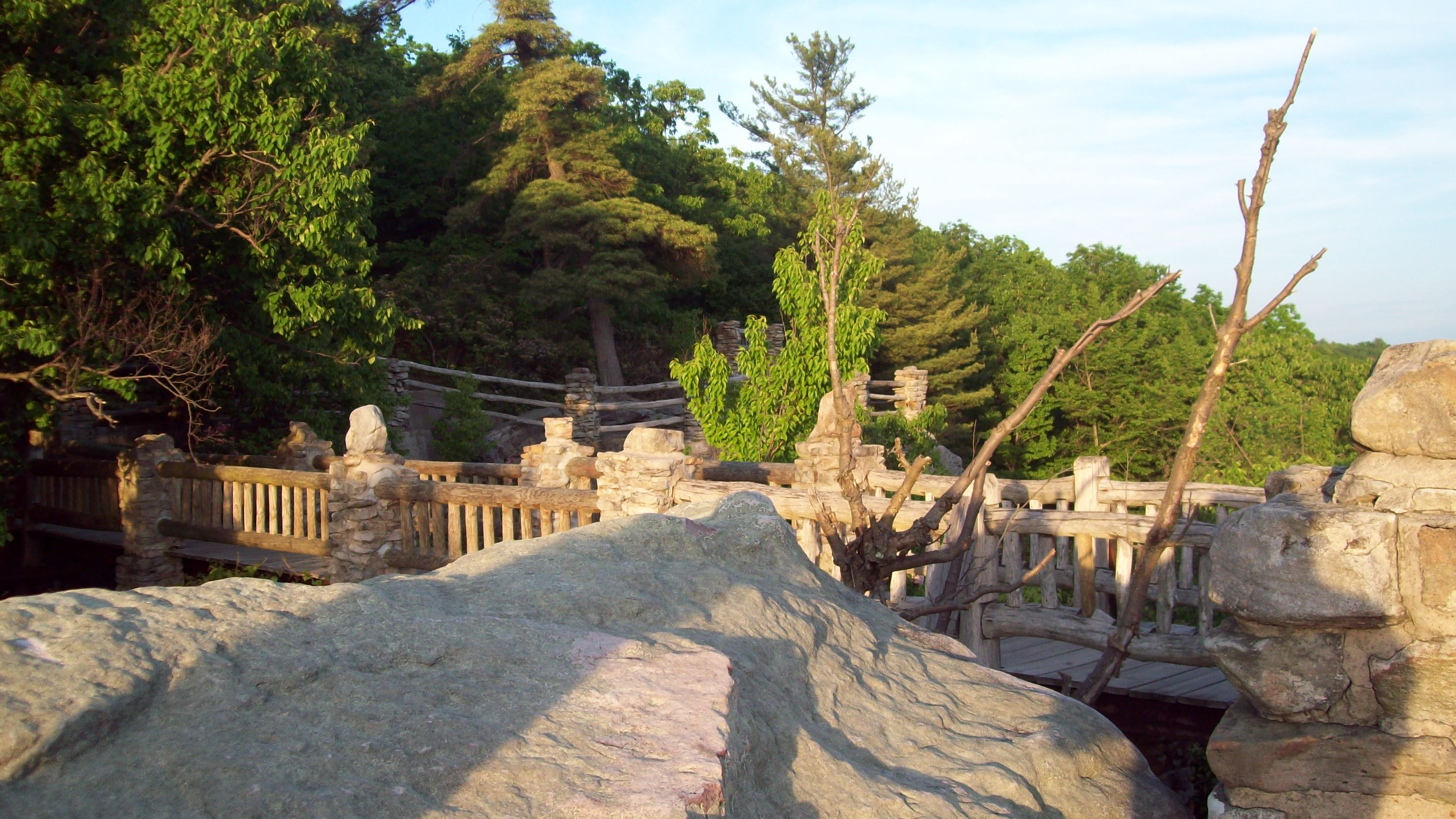
- Coopers Rock Overlook in the evening

- Location within West Virginia Location within the United States
- Location: Off Interstate 68 8 mi (13 km) east of Morgantown, near Morgantown, West Virginia
- Coordinates: 39°38′18″N 79°48′56″W
- Area: 91 acres (37 ha)
- Built: 1936
- Built by: Civilian Conservation Corps
- Architectural style: NPS Rustic
- MPS: Coopers Rock State Forest MPS
- NRHP reference No.: 91000545
- Added to NRHP: May 15, 1991

Camp Rhododendron, also known as Camp Rhododendron Recreational Historic District, is a historic Civilian Conservation Corps camp and national historic district located at Cooper's Rock State Forest near Morgantown, Monongalia County, West Virginia. The district includes seven contributing buildings, one contributing structure, and two contributing objects. It was constructed between 1936 and 1942, and includes a pumphouse, Robert Fechner Monument, information booth, three pavilions, an overlook / walkway, concession stand, fire warning sign, and trail chalet. They are built of hewn logs and sandstone and representative of the Depression-era Rustic style of architecture. Located nearby is the Cooper's Rock State Forest Superintendent's House and Garage, also built by the CCC.

It was listed on the National Register of Historic Places in 1991.
