= Cheat Lake =

Man-made lake in West Virginia, United States

- Lake Lynn
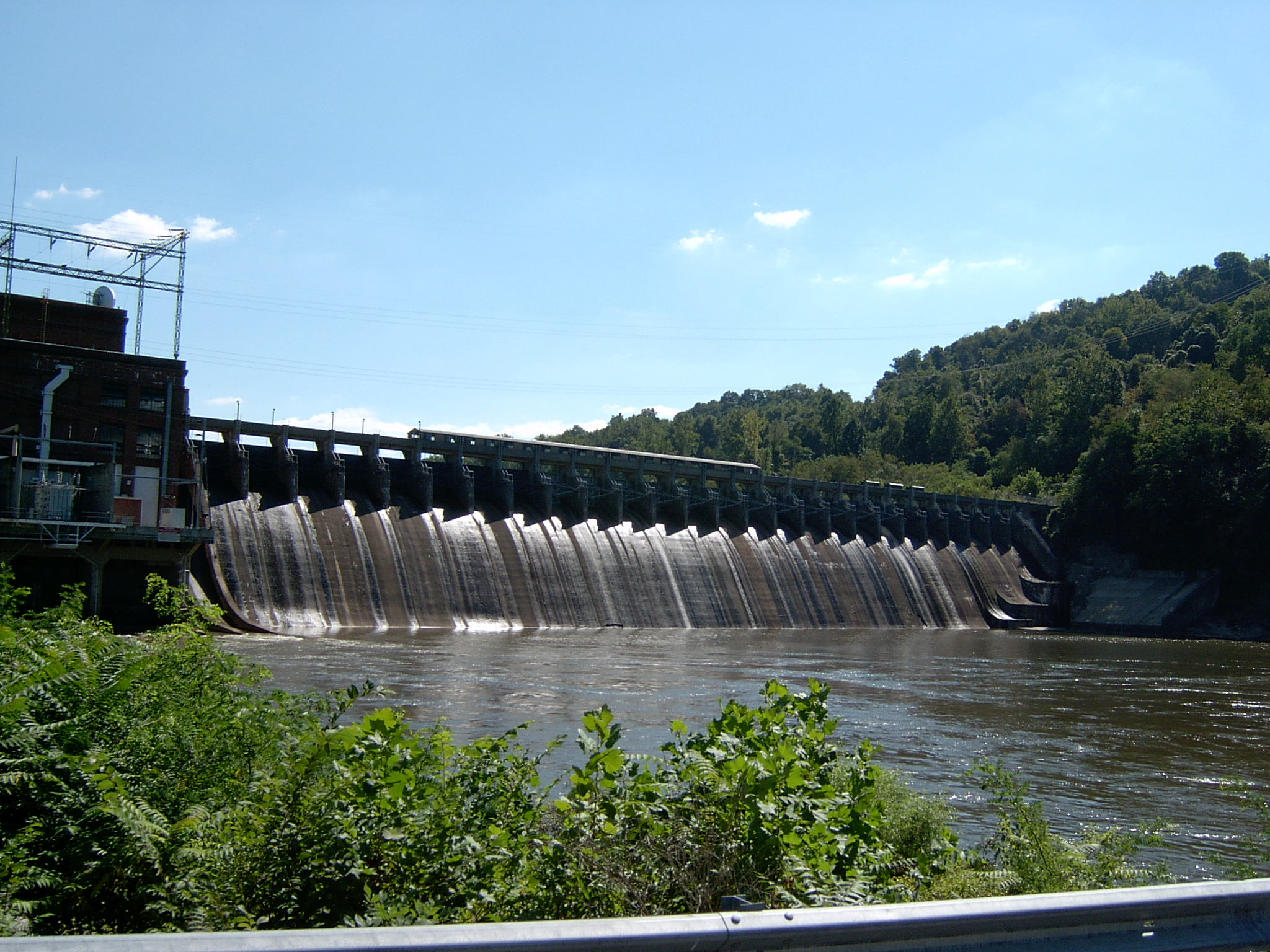
- Lake Lynn Dam

- Location within West Virginia
- Location: Monongalia, West Virginia
- Coordinates: 39°43′10″N 79°51′24″W
- Type: Reservoir
- Primary inflows: Cheat River
- Managing agency: Lake Lynn Generation, LLC
- Built: 1925
- Max. length: 13 mi (21 km)
- Surface area: 1,730 acres (700 ha)
- Surface elevation: 870 ft (270 m)
- Settlements: Morgantown, West Virginia

Cheat Lake is a 13-mile-long (21 km) reservoir on the Cheat River in Monongalia County, West Virginia, United States. It was originally named Lake Lynn, but the Board on Geographic Names officially decided upon Cheat Lake as the reservoir's name in 1976. Cheat Lake is located immediately downstream of the 10-mile-long (16 km) Cheat Canyon.

Cheat Lake has three marinas located towards the river end of the reservoir. They are Edgewater Marina, Cheat Lake Marina, and Sunset Beach Marina.

Cheat Lake Dam is located directly south of the Mason–Dixon line border with Pennsylvania. The dam has a generating capacity of 52 megawatts (70,000 hp) using four Francis turbines. Cheat Lake Dam's total length across the Cheat River is approximately 1,000 feet (300 m). The first water flowed over the dam on December 23, 1925 and it began its operation on May 31, 1926.

A warning system delivers light and sound alerts of high-flow discharges one mile (1.6 km) downstream of the dam, and station personnel can operate it to warn of violations to the 1,000-foot (300 m) upstream and 1,200-foot (370 m) downstream exclusion zones.

== See also ==
- List of lakes of West Virginia
- Mont Chateau State Park, a former state park (1955–1977) along Cheat Lake
- Coopers Rock State Forest
- Snake Hill Wildlife Management Area
