= Cooper's Rock State Forest Superintendent's House and Garage =

Historic house in West Virginia, United States

- Coopers Rock State Forest Superintendent's House and Garage
- U.S. National Register of Historic Places
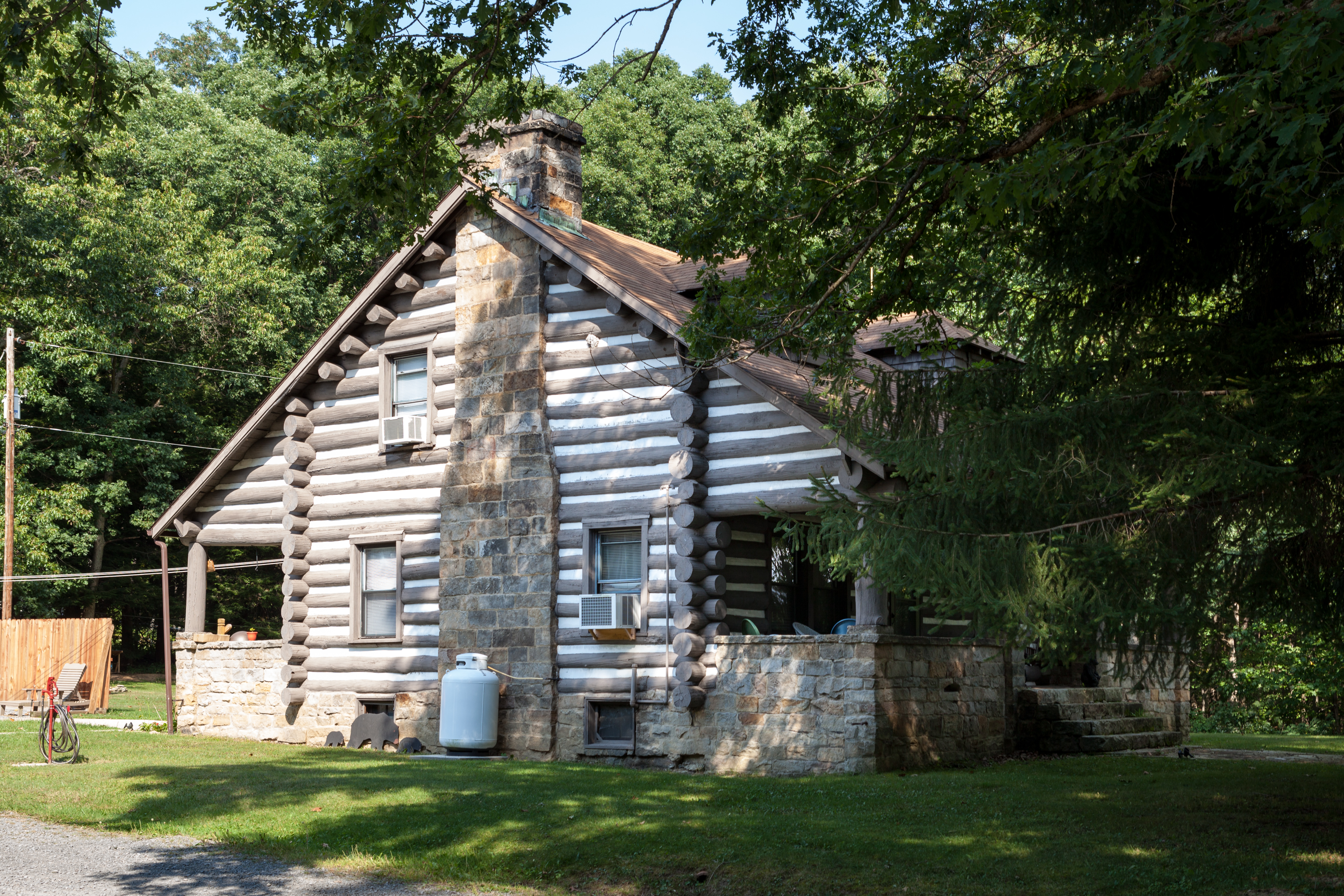
- The house in 2015

- Location within West Virginia Location within the United States
- Location: Off Interstate 68 8 mi (13 km) east of Morgantown, near Morgantown, West Virginia
- Coordinates: 39°39′38″N 79°46′53″W
- Area: 6 acres (2.4 ha)
- Built: 1938
- Architect: Civilian Conservation Corps
- Architectural style: NPS Rustic
- MPS: Coopers Rock State Forest MPS
- NRHP reference No.: 91000546
- Added to NRHP: May 15, 1991

Cooper's Rock State Forest Superintendent's House and Garage is a historic home and garage located at Cooper's Rock State Forest near Morgantown, Monongalia County, West Virginia. The house was built between 1938 and 1940, and is a two-story, symmetrical log building, measuring 35 feet by 43 feet. Also on the property is a contributing garage also of log construction. Both buildings were built by the Civilian Conservation Corps, CCC camp number 3527, Camp Rhododendron.

It was listed on the National Register of Historic Places in 1991. The Superintendent's House was heavily damaged by a fire on April 7, 2017.
