= Horseshoe Run (Cheat River tributary) =

Stream in West Virginia, U.S.

Coordinates: 39°09′08″N 79°39′41″W

Horseshoe Run is a stream in the U.S. state of West Virginia. It is a tributary of the Cheat River.

Horseshoe Run was so named because it enters the Cheat at Horseshoe Bend, a horseshoe-shaped meander in the river.

== See also ==
- List of rivers of West Virginia
