= Mont Chateau State Park =

Defunct state park in West Virginia, United States

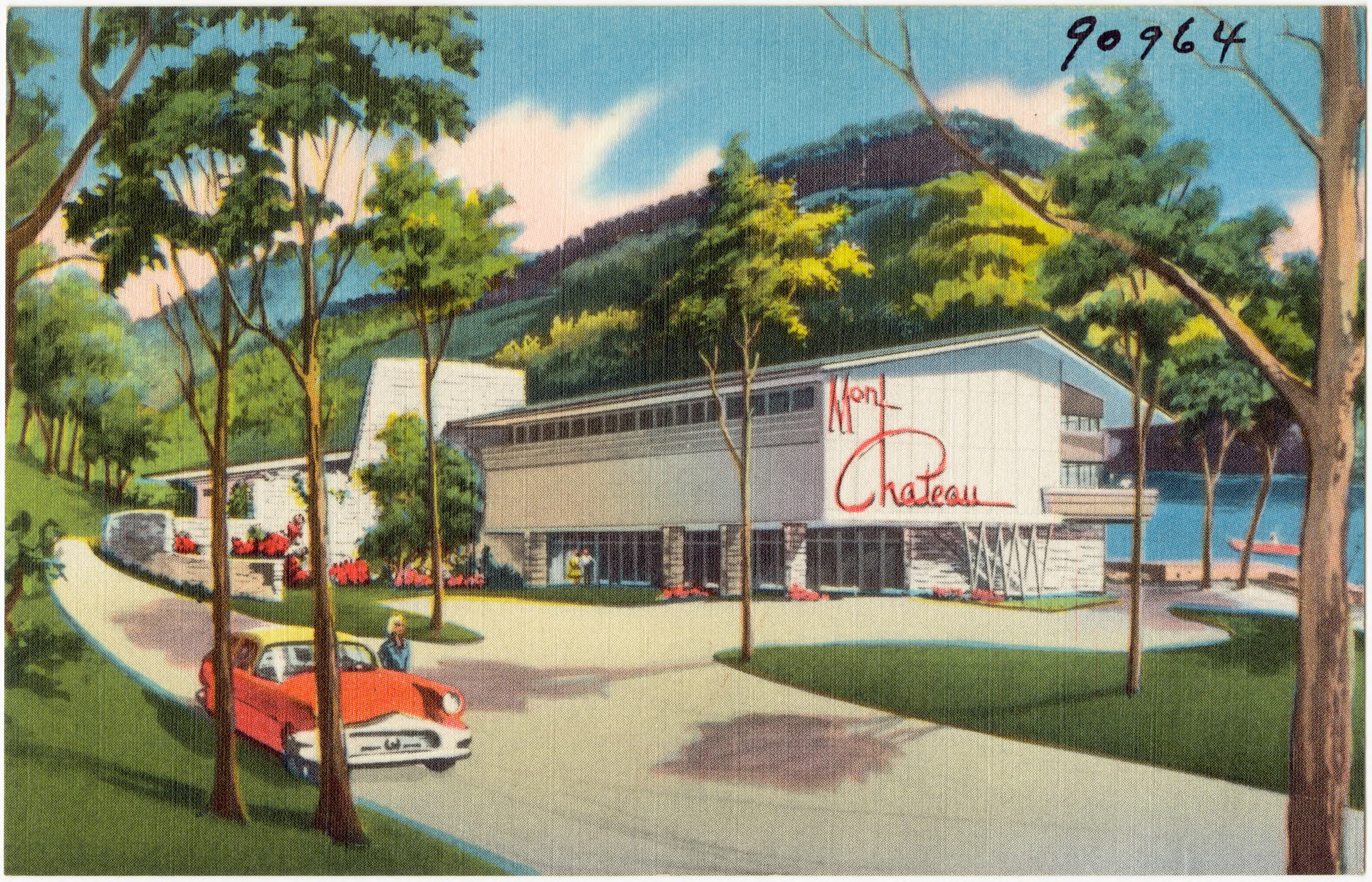
- Postcard image of the former lodge

- Location within West Virginia
- Location: Monongalia, West Virginia, United States
- Coordinates: 39°39′33″N 79°50′52″W
- Area: 42.16 acres (17.06 ha)
- Elevation: 1,056 ft (322 m)
- Established: June 1955
- Website: WVGES Museum at Mont Chateau

Mont Chateau State Park was formerly a state park located beside Cheat Lake in Monongalia County, West Virginia, USA.

== History ==
=== Commissioning and operations ===
Some 42.16 acres (17 ha) of land for park were originally purchased in June 1955. A new lodge was subsequently constructed and opened, along with the beach, on June 7, 1958. After unsuccessfully attempting different ways of managing and operating the park, it was closed in 1977.

=== Current status ===
While the park itself was closed, the state has retained a 13-acre (5.3 ha) portion of the site. The former lodge has housed the West Virginia Geological and Economic Survey, including a small geology museum, since the 1970s. The land also provides access from the Coopers Rock State Forest trail system to Cheat Lake. The other 29.16 acres (11.80 ha) were first leased and then sold to Fred St. Clair in 1985 for recreational use.

== See also ==
- Coopers Rock State Forest
- List of West Virginia state parks
- Cheat Lake
