= Cheat Canyon =

Canyon in West Virginia, United States

Coordinates: 39.742630°N 79.901198°W

- Length: 10.5 mi (16.9 km)

Geography
- Location: Allegheny Mountains, West Virginia
- Interactive map of Cheat Canyon

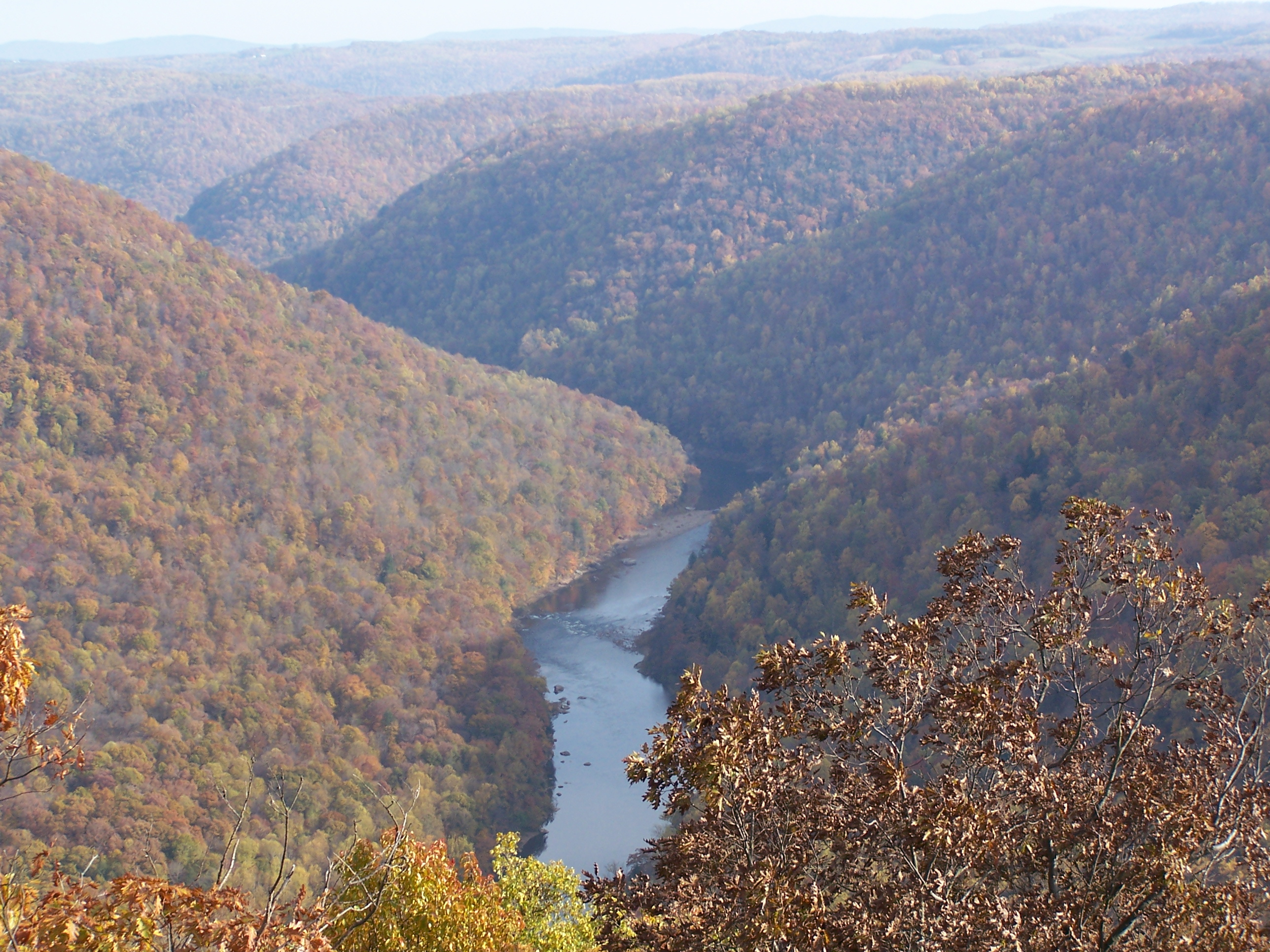
Cheat Canyon and the Cheat River from Cooper's Rock Overlook

Cheat Canyon—also called Cheat River Canyon or Cheat River Gorge—is a 10-mile (16 km) long, forested Canyon of the Cheat River at the western edge of the Allegheny Mountains in northeastern West Virginia, United States. A popular whitewater venue, for many years the Canyon has been the object of controversy as environmental activists have contended with timber and development interests over its preservation status.

== Description ==
The remote Cheat Canyon was carved by the Cheat River and extends for about 10.5 miles between the towns of Albright in Preston County and Cheat Lake in Monongalia County, West Virginia. The steep forested slopes rise as much as 1,200 feet from the river bed to the Canyon rim.

== History ==
In 1772, the Dunkards, an Anabaptist religious sect, were the first Europeans to settle on Cheat River, lying within the canyon. Due to coal mining, poor forest management, and a private dam, fish were severely threatened near the lower end of this river, which was listed as the eighth most endangered river in the United States during the 1990s.

In July 2023, a man had to be helicopter lifted out of the canyon after being reported missing. He was sent to Ruby Memorial Hospital for treatment.

== Geology ==
The Canyon rim with its steep tributaries is composed of hard, white, grainy Pottsville sandstone. This forms the outcrops and cliffs along the rim which often break off to form talus fields that gradually slide down the forest slopes and pile up at the river bottom. Numerous caves have been formed by water in the Greenbrier Limestone of the lower strata of the Canyon walls.

== Ecology and preservation ==
A timber company planning to log sensitive parts of Cheat Canyon agreed to protect the habitat of two federally imperiled species, the threatened flat-spired three-toothed snail (Triodopsis platysayoides) and the endangered Indiana bat (Myotis sodalis). In addition, according to the Association for Biodiversity Information, there are eight other globally uncommon plant and animal species in the canyon: Virginia bladetooth snail, delicate vertigo snail, eastern small-footed bat, green salamander, Allegheny woodrat, Barbara's buttons, an unnamed amphipod, and an unnamed isopod.

There are also concerns about flood risk. Environmental activists worry that removal of old-growth trees could increase the risk of flood. There are several environmental groups opposing the project, including Speak For The Trees Too, the West Virginia Chapter of Sierra Club, Friends of Blackwater, West Virginia Environmental Council and West Virginia Highlands Conservancy.

== Whitewater recreation ==
The river in the Canyon features Class IV rapids (and Class V rapids at upper levels), making it a popular destination for whitewater kayaking and rafting. The toughest and most celebrated rapids are known as Big Nasty, High Falls, and Upper Coliseum. On the first weekend in May of every year, paddlers gather from many states to attend the Cheat Festival. A whitewater race—The Cheat River Race—takes place in the Canyon on the Friday of that weekend. Unlike the overwhelming majority of whitewater races which employ a staggered start, this race uses a mass start (in which all participants start at the same time). For the first few miles, paddlers must avoid one another, in addition to the whitewater hazards that the river presents. The race, which typically attracts about 150 contestants, is often cited as the largest whitewater race in existence.

== See also ==
- Coopers Rock State Forest
- Snake Hill Wildlife Management Area
