= Jonathan Run =

Stream in West Virginia, U.S.

Coordinates: 39°11′01″N 79°43′39″W

Jonathan Run is a stream in the U.S. state of West Virginia.

Jonathan Run has the name of Jonathan Minear.

== See also ==
- List of rivers of West Virginia
