= Licking Creek (West Virginia) =

Stream in West Virginia, U.S.

Coordinates: 39°13′38″N 79°43′14″W

Licking Creek is a stream in the U.S. state of West Virginia.

Licking Creek most likely was so named on account of mineral licks near its course.

== See also ==
- List of rivers of West Virginia
