= Elsey Run =

Stream in West Virginia, U.S.

Coordinates: 39°28′43″N 79°38′05″W

Elsey Run is a stream in the U.S. state of West Virginia.

Elsey Run was perhaps named after Nicholas Elsey, a settler.

== See also ==
- List of rivers of West Virginia
