= Snake Hill Wildlife Management Area =

Protected area in West Virginia, USA

- IUCN category V (protected landscape/seascape)
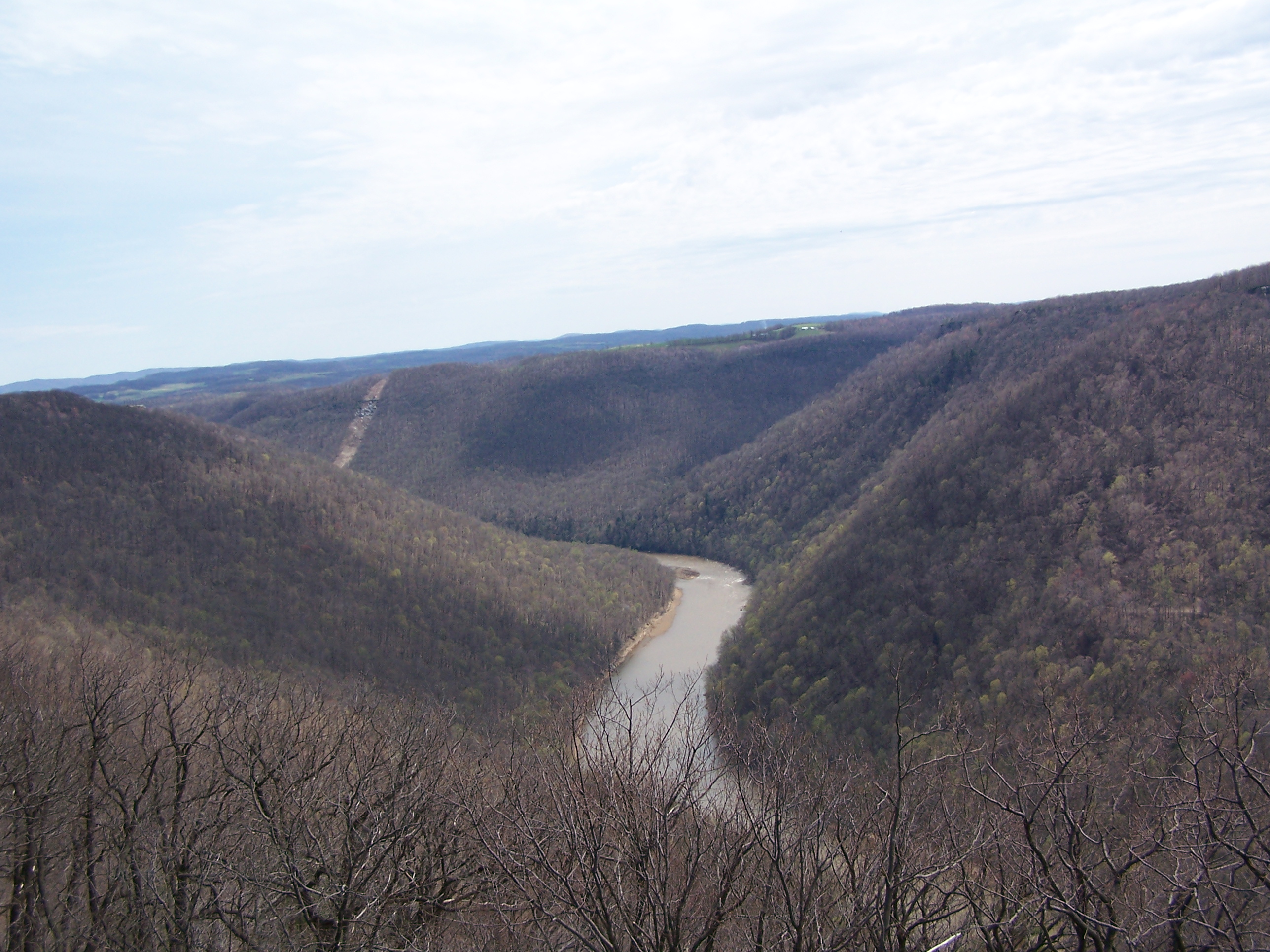
- Cheat River with Snake Hill WMA on the right hillside.

- Location within West Virginia
- Location: West Virginia, United States
- Coordinates: 39°37′45″N 79°46′36″W
- Area: 3,092 acres (12.51 km^{2})
- Elevation: 1,634 ft (498 m)
- Website: WVDNR District 1 Wildlife Management Areas

The Snake Hill Wildlife Management Area is a hill area covering 3,092 acres (1,251 ha) along the Cheat canyon (78.3-mile-long) in Monongalia and Preston Counties, West Virginia. The wildlife management area mostly lies directly south of Coopers Rock State Forest, protecting the southern side of Cheat Canyon. The canyon has been the object of controversy as environmental activists contended with timber and development interests over the years of its preservation status.

== See also ==
- Animal conservation
- Hunting
- Fishing
- List of West Virginia wildlife management areas
