= Cheat Neck, West Virginia =

Unincorporated community in West Virginia, United States

- Unincorporated community
- Location within West Virginia Location within the United States
- Coordinates: 39°41′06″N 79°50′02″W
- Country: United States
- State: West Virginia
- County: Monongalia
- Elevation: 1,158 ft (353 m)
- Time zone: UTC-5 (Eastern (EST))
  - Summer (DST): UTC-4 (EDT)
- GNIS ID: 1537228

Cheat Neck is an unincorporated community in Monongalia County, West Virginia, United States.
