= Coopers Rock State Forest =

State Forest in West Virginia, U.S.

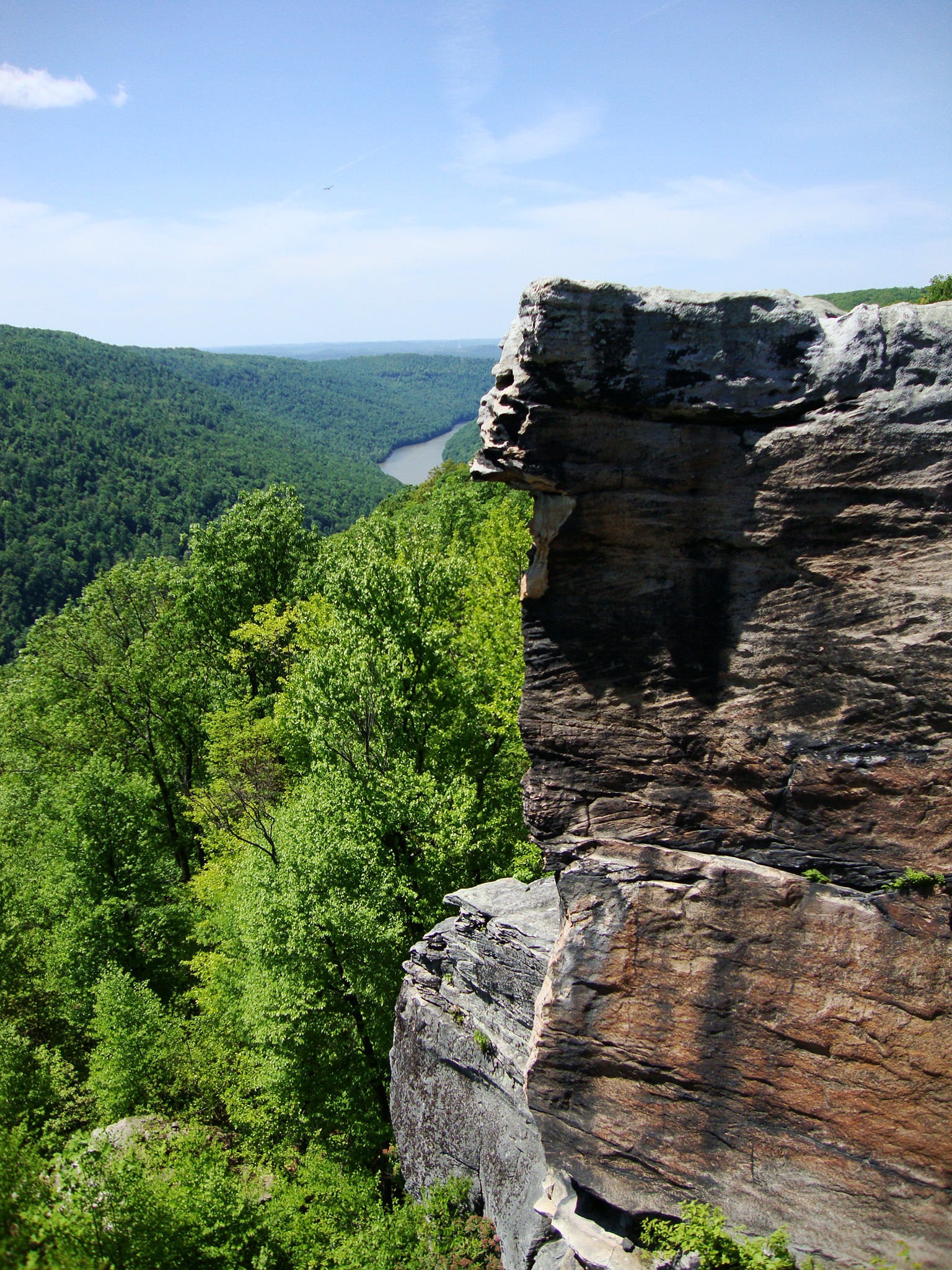
- Cheat River from Raven Rock Overlook

- Location within West Virginia
- Location: West Virginia, United States
- Coordinates: 39°39′20″N 79°47′16″W
- Area: 12,747 acres (51.59 km^{2})
- Elevation: 2,159 ft (658 m)
- Operator: West Virginia Division of Natural Resources and West Virginia Division of Forestry
- Website: wvstateparks.com/park/coopers-rock-state-forest/

Coopers Rock State Forest is a 12,747-acre (52 km^{2}) state forest in Monongalia and Preston counties in the U.S. state of West Virginia. Its southern edge abuts Cheat Lake and the canyon section of Cheat River, a popular whitewater rafting river in the eastern United States.

== History ==
Coopers Rock State Forest gets its name from a legend about a fugitive who hid from the law near what is now the overlook. A cooper by trade, he resumed making barrels at his new mountain hideout, selling them to people in nearby communities. He lived and worked in the forest for many years.

Much of Coopers Rock was originally developed by projects of the Civilian Conservation Corps from 1936 to 1942. Many of these structures, including durable rustic picnic shelters made of American chestnut, exist today and are listed on the National Register of Historic Places.

== Forest management ==
The Coopers Rock forest is roughly bisected by Interstate 68. The northern portion of the forest is managed by the forestry program at West Virginia University and is lesser-developed. The southern part is jointly managed by the West Virginia Division of Natural Resources and West Virginia Division of Forestry. It is more developed than some of the other state forests as it functions as a major recreation destination for the Morgantown area.

== Recreation activities ==
Coopers Rock provides a diverse array of recreational opportunities. While the forest itself is open year-round, the main entrance to the southern portion of the park is closed each year from December 31 to March 31. During the winter, visitors will need to park at the first lot off I-68 and walk in.

=== Overlooks ===
==== Main overlook ====
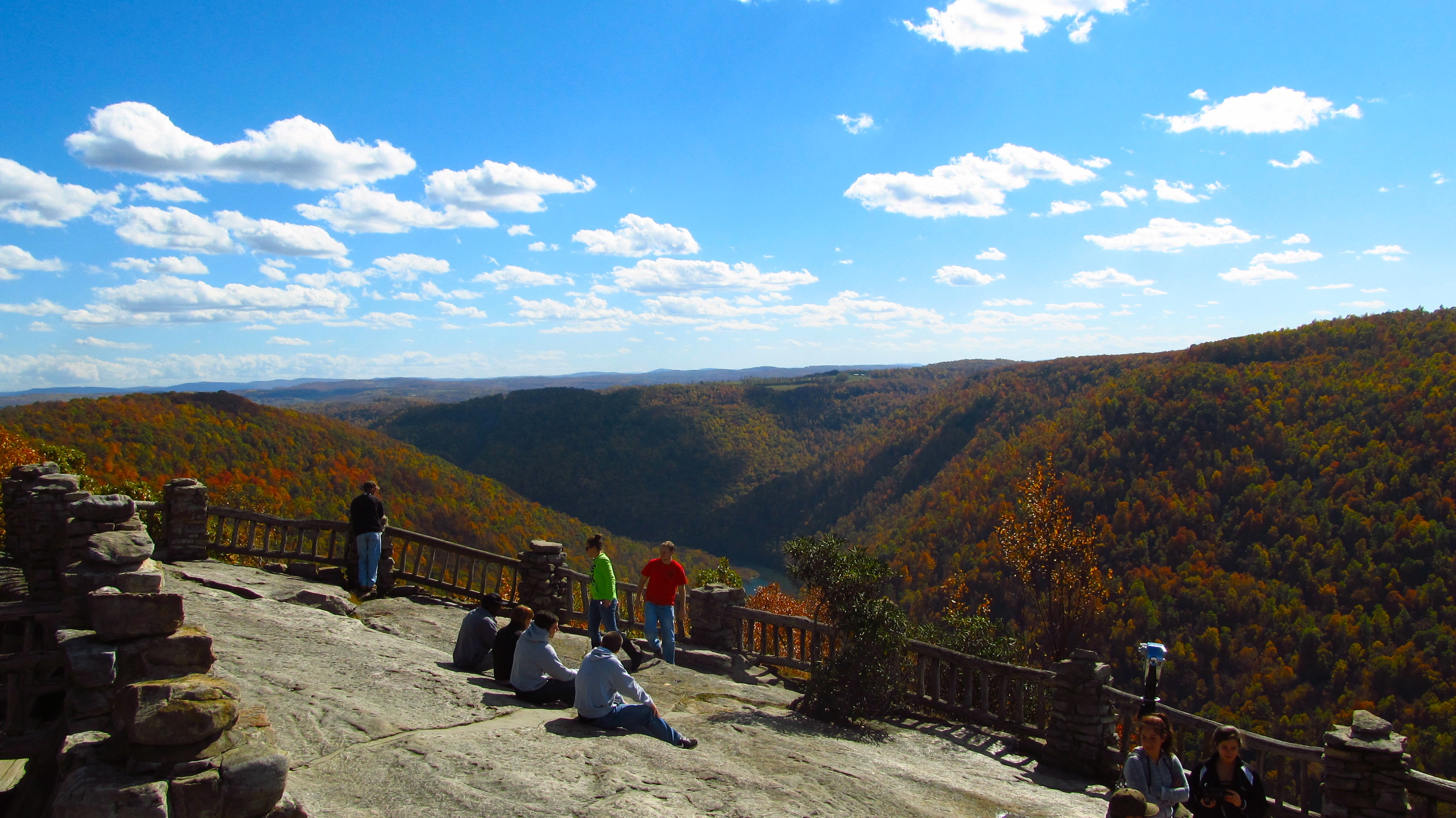
Main overlook in October 2012

The forest is best known for its scenic overlooks of the Cheat River in Cheat Canyon. The main overlook is accessible by car and was developed as a CCC project. It provides excellent views of the Cheat, Snake Hill Wildlife Management Area across the river, and Morgantown to the west. The overlook is located on a large rock connected to the main land by a footbridge. It is not handicapped-accessible, but there is a nearby ADA-compliant overlook.

==== Raven Rock overlook ====
For a more rustic view, many people take the approximately 2 miles (3.2 km) hike to Raven Rock. This site, which is dominated by a high-voltage power line crossing of the Cheat River, is home to a series of large boulders and features a point that juts into the canyon. Hikers to this site with pets and children should be cautious as there are no railings - missteps could lead to significant and potentially fatal falls.

=== Hiking ===
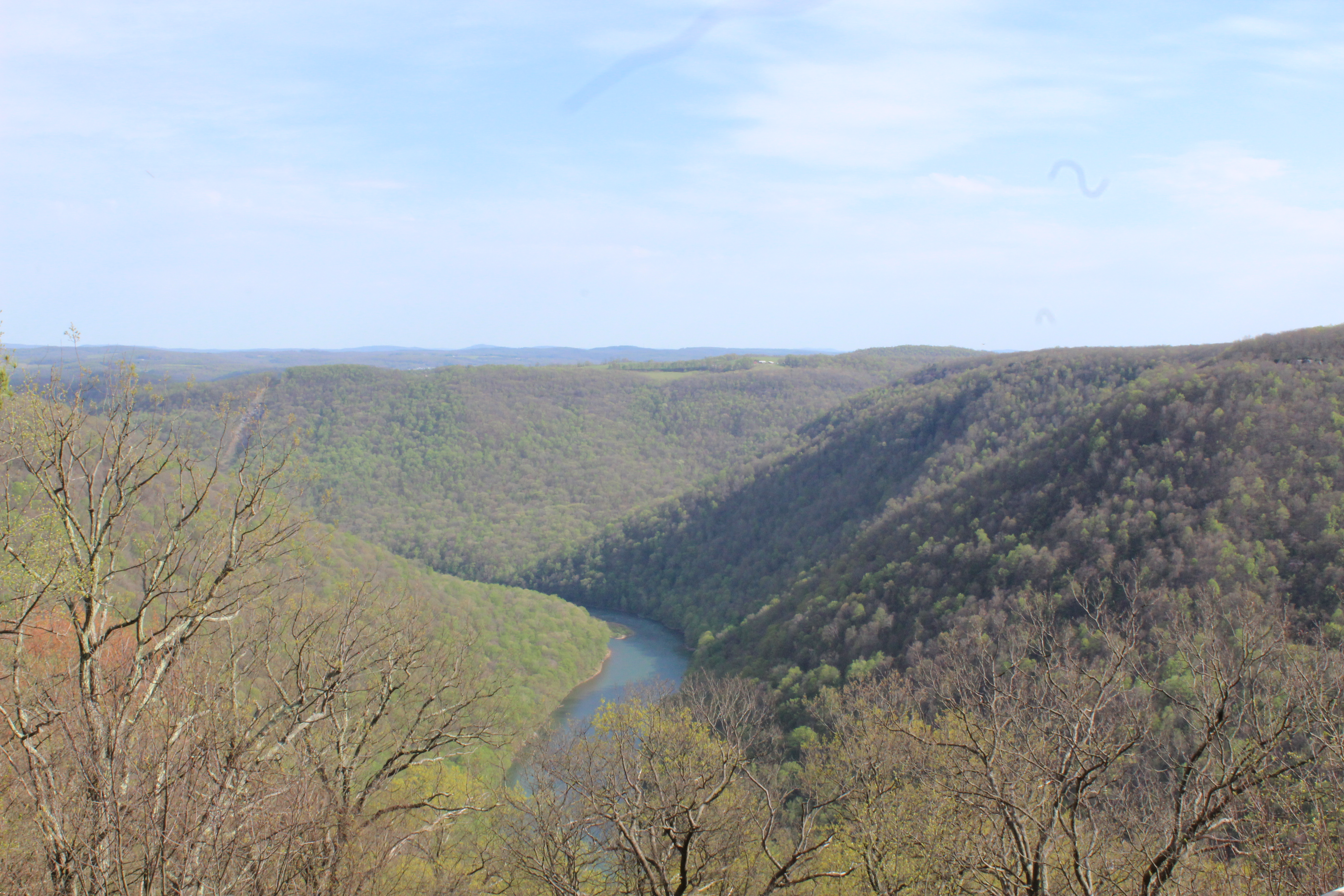
Overlook view of Cheat river from disability platform.

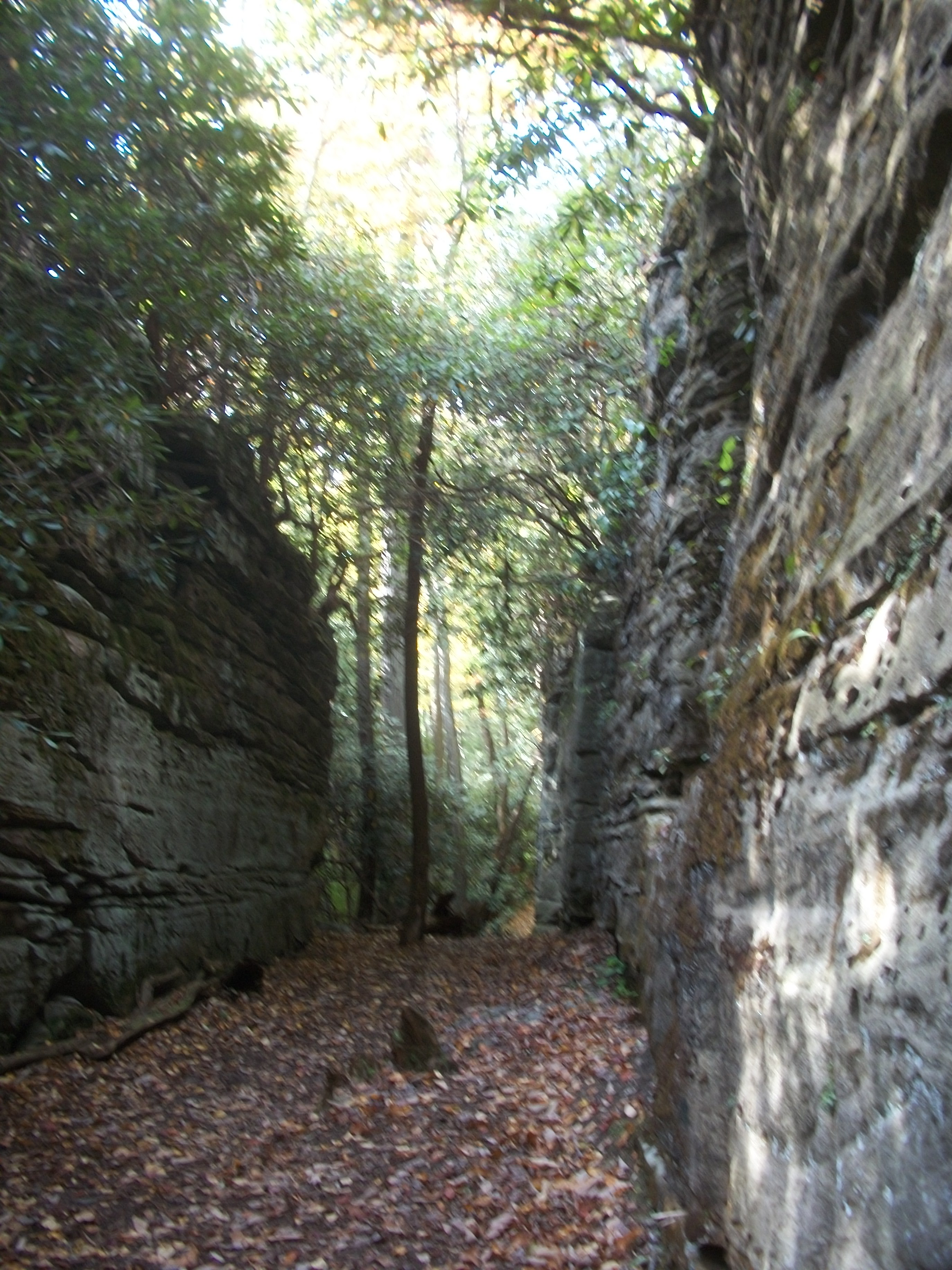
View from inside the Rock City canyon

Coopers Rock is home to a well-developed system of nearly 50 miles (80 km) of hiking trails. These trails are generally usable for cross-country skiing during the winter.

One trail, approximately 3 miles (4.8 km) long, provides access to the former Mont Chateau State Park at Cheat Lake.

The Rock City Trail leads through rock city, a long crevasse between towering outcrops.

=== Rock Climbing ===
Coopers Rock is a popular bouldering area with boulder problems ranging from V0-V11 and numerous areas that can be easily set up for top-roping. Bolting is currently prohibited.

=== Campgrounds ===
The McCollum Camping Area is a 25-site campground at Coopers Rock open April 1- October 31. All sites have electric hookups and there is a shower house in the campground. Wi-Fi access is provided for registered campsites.

The Rhododendron Camping Area is a 25-site campground at Coopers Rock open April 1 - October 31. All sites are non-electric and there is a central bathhouse. This campground is open only to tent/hammock camping.

=== Henry Clay Iron Furnace ===
Aside from the overlooks, the Henry Clay Iron Furnace is perhaps the most well-known portion of the forest. Accessible via the Clay Furnace or Clay Run trails, the furnace was built between 1834 and 1836 and produced pig iron. Capable of producing 4 tons of iron each day, the furnace employed about 200 people and operated until 1847.

It was listed on the National Register of Historic Places in 1970.

== See also ==
- List of West Virginia state forests
- Cheat River
- Cheat Lake
- Mont Chateau State Park, a former state park adjoining the forest
- Cooper's Rock State Forest Superintendent's House and Garage
