= Allegheny Mountains =

Mountain range in the northeastern United States

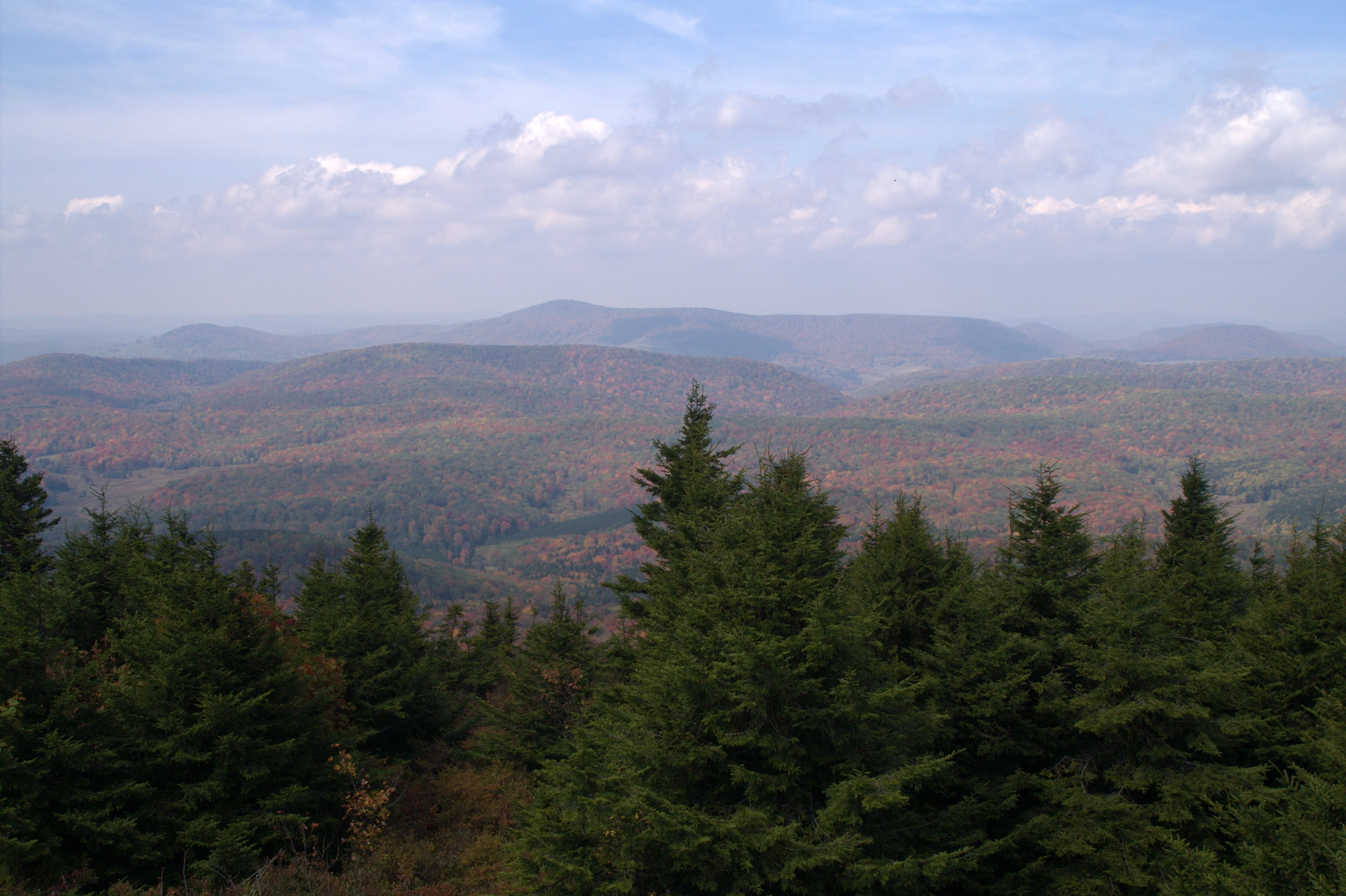
- View from atop Spruce Mountain in eastern West Virginia, the highest point in the Alleghenies

Highest point
- Peak: Spruce Knob of Spruce Mountain, Pendleton County, West Virginia
- Elevation: 4,863 ft (1,482 m)

Geography
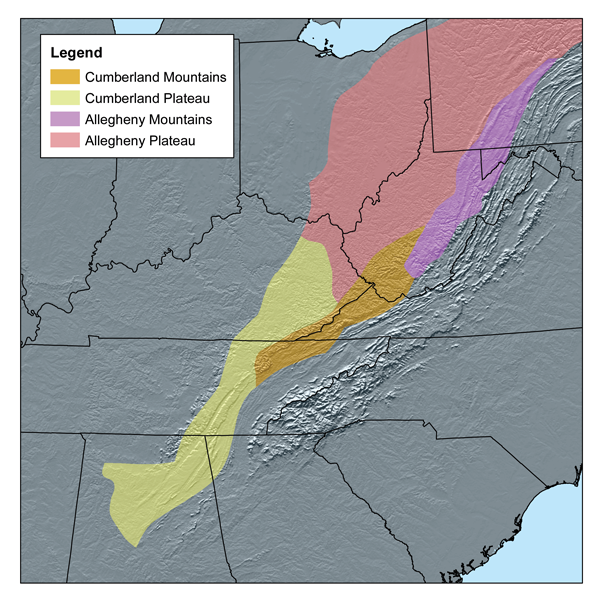
- Map showing the Allegheny Mountains (in purple) as part of the larger Appalachian Plateau province of the Appalachian Highlands physiographic division. (USGS)
- Country: United States
- States: Pennsylvania; Maryland; West Virginia; Virginia
- Parent range: Ridge-and-valley Appalachians
- Borders on: Cumberland Mountains

Geology
- Orogeny: Alleghenian orogeny
- Rock types: Sandstone; Quartzite

The Allegheny Mountains (/ˌælɪˈɡeɪni/ AL-ih-GAY-nee) are a mountain range situated in the eastern United States. A sub-range of the much vaster Appalachian Mountains, they extend roughly 300 miles (480 km) along a northeast-southwest orientation from north-central Pennsylvania southwestward, through western Maryland and eastern West Virginia. The peaks further continue into portions of Virginia and Tennessee as the Cumberland Mountains—which are essentially part of the same landform—while giving way to the Ridge and Valley Appalachians in the east and northeast.

The Alleghenies comprise a rugged central portion of the Appalachians, rising to 4,862 feet (1,482 m) at Spruce Mountain in Pendleton County, West Virginia. In the east, they are dominated by a high, steep escarpment known as the Allegheny Front. In the west, they slope down into the closely associated Allegheny Plateau, which extends into portions of Ohio, Kentucky, and Upstate New York. The mountains consist primarily of sandstone and quartzite, the latter of which is extremely resistant to weathering and has allowed the range to maintain much of its height for millions of years. Technically belonging to the Appalachian Plateau province rather than geologically being a "true" mountain range, they have nevertheless been dissected by various watercourses.

Much of the Allegheny Mountains are public lands, most prominently including the Monongahela National Forest, while other tracts are privately owned. Many of these public lands are open to recreation. Their principal settlements are Altoona and Johnstown, Pennsylvania; Cumberland, Maryland; and Elkins, West Virginia. The range has continuously been inhabited by Indigenous groups of Algonquian, Siouan, Iroquoian, and other extractions for millennia. It presented a significant barrier to westward expansion for English colonists—later Americans—which was gradually bridged by various roads, canals, and eventually railroads. The mountains were long dominated by the coal mining and lumber industries, and the regional economy has been detrimentally impacted by their decline.

Ecologically, the Alleghenies are covered by Appalachian mixed mesophytic forests, a type of temperate broadleaf and mixed forest; common trees include sugar maple, beech, tuliptree, basswood, and northern red oak. Among the prevalent fauna are many migratory bird species like wood warblers, vireos, and thrushes. A large number of fish, shellfish, amphibian, and other invertebrate species including hellbenders, lungless salamanders, slugs, leeches, and earthworms are endemic. Common mammals include black bears, white-tailed deer, coyotes, and raccoons. Some of the High Alleghenies contain pockets of Appalachian temperate rainforest, the only true rainforest in eastern North America.

== Etymology ==
The name is derived from the Allegheny River, which drains only a small portion of the Alleghenies in west-central Pennsylvania. The meaning of the word, which comes from the Lenape (Delaware) Native Americans, is not definitively known but is usually translated as "fine river". The closest approximation which makes sense is some context from the Jesuit Relations showing that Alligeh was one of several accepted renderings of the name of the Erie people among the early 17th century missionaries among the Native peoples throughout the eastern Great Lakes region, along with Rique, Yenresh and Erichronon. The suffix -ni means "of the", in Lenape, despite that geh is also Iroquoian for "of the". So, most likely, Alligehni or Oligini would be the Lenape name for the original homeland of the Erie people.

The word "Allegheny" was once commonly used to refer to the whole of what are now called the Appalachian Mountains. John Norton used it (spelled variously) around 1810 to refer to the mountains in Tennessee and Georgia. Around the same time, Washington Irving proposed renaming the United States either "Appalachia" or "Alleghania". In 1861, Arnold Henry Guyot published the first systematic geologic study of the whole mountain range. His map labeled the range as the "Alleghanies", but his book was titled On the Appalachian Mountain System. As late as 1867, John Muir—in his book A Thousand Mile Walk to the Gulf—used the word "Alleghanies" in referring to the southern Appalachians.

There was no general agreement about the "Appalachians" versus the "Alleghanies" until the late 19th century.

== Geography ==
=== Extent ===
From northeast to southwest, the Allegheny Mountains run about 300 miles (480 km). From west to east, at their widest, they are about 100 miles (160 km). (Note: Colloquially the Alleghenies encompass what is classified as the Kanawa Province in the USGS physiographical definitions.) When combining the Allegheny Province with the Kanawa Province, they run 400 miles (640 km).

The USGS physiographic classification of all land in the United States lists the Allegheny Mountains as a section within the larger Appalachian Plateau province. It may be generally defined to the south by the Allegheny Front, and to the east by the Susquehanna River valley. To the west, the Alleghenies grade down into the dissected Allegheny Plateau. The westernmost ridges are considered to be the Laurel Highlands and Chestnut Ridge in Pennsylvania, and Laurel Mountain and Rich Mountain in West Virginia.

Big Stone Ridge marks the southern extent of the Alleghenies and is an outlier of Flat Top Mountain, with the Tug Fork river running along its western flank. The land to the south and to the west of the Alleghenies is the Valley and Ridge physiographic province.

=== Allegheny Front and Allegheny Highlands ===
The eastern edge of the Alleghenies is marked by the Allegheny Front, which is also sometimes considered the eastern terminus of the Allegheny Plateau. This great escarpment roughly follows a portion of the Eastern Continental Divide in this area. Several gorges and valleys drain the Alleghenies: to the east, Smoke Hole Canyon (South Branch Potomac River), and to the west the New River Gorge and the Blackwater and Cheat Canyons. Thus, about half the precipitation falling on the Alleghenies makes its way west to the Mississippi and half goes east to Chesapeake Bay and the Atlantic seaboard.

The highest ridges of the Alleghenies are just west of the Front, with an east/west elevational change of up to 3,000 feet (910 m). Absolute elevations of the Allegheny Highlands reach nearly 5,000 feet (1,500 m), with the highest elevations in the southern part of the range. The highest point in the Allegheny Mountains is Spruce Knob (4,863 ft; 1,482 m), on Spruce Mountain in West Virginia. Other notable Allegheny highpoints include Thorny Flat on Cheat Mountain (4,848 ft; 1,478 m), Bald Knob on Back Allegheny Mountain (4,842 ft; 1,476 m), and Mount Porte Crayon (4,770 ft; 1,450 m), all in West Virginia; Dans Mountain (2,898 ft; 883 m) in Maryland, Backbone Mountain (3,360 ft; 1,020 m), the highest point in Maryland; Mount Davis (3,213 ft; 979 m), the highest point in Pennsylvania, and the second highest, Blue Knob (3,146 ft; 959 m).

=== Development ===
The Alleghenies contain relatively few large urban centers. The four most populous cities in the region are, in descending order, Altoona, State College, and Johnstown in Pennsylvania, and Cumberland in Maryland.

In the 1970s and 1980s, the Interstate Highway System was extended into the northern portion of the Alleghenies. The region is now served by a network of federal expressways—Interstates 80, 70/76 and 68. Interstate 64 traverses the southern extremity of the range, but the Central Alleghenies (the "High Alleghenies" of eastern West Virginia) have posed challenges for highway planners owing to the region's rugged terrain and environmental sensitivities (see Corridor H). The central Alleghenies continue to rely on a limited network of secondary highways, and the region maintains a lower population density compared to adjacent areas.

In the telecommunications field, a unique impediment to development in the central Allegheny region is the United States National Radio Quiet Zone (NRQZ), a large rectangle of land—about 13,000 square miles (34,000 km^{2})—that straddles the border area of Virginia and West Virginia. Created in 1958 by the Federal Communications Commission, the NRQZ restricts all omnidirectional and high-power radio transmissions, although cell phone service is allowed throughout much of the area.

=== Protected areas ===
Much of the Monongahela (West Virginia), George Washington (West Virginia, Virginia) and Jefferson (Virginia) National Forests lie within the Allegheny Mountains. The Alleghenies also include a number of federally designated wilderness areas, such as the Dolly Sods Wilderness, Laurel Fork Wilderness, and Cranberry Wilderness in West Virginia.

The mostly completed Allegheny Trail, a project of the West Virginia Scenic Trails Association since 1975, runs the length of the range within West Virginia. The northern terminus is at the Mason–Dixon line and the southern is at the West Virginia-Virginia border on Peters Mountain.

== Geology ==
The bedrock of the Alleghenies is mostly sandstone and metamorphosed sandstone, quartzite, which is extremely resistant to weathering. Prominent beds of resistant conglomerate can be found in some areas, such as the Dolly Sods. When it weathers, it leaves behind a pure white quartzite gravel. The rock layers of the Alleghenies were formed during the Appalachian orogeny.

Because of intense freeze-thaw cycles in the higher Alleghenies, there is little native bedrock exposed in most areas. The ground surface usually rests on a massive jumble of sandstone rocks, with air space between them, that are gradually moving down-slope. The crest of the Allegheny Front is an exception, where high bluffs are often exposed.

Mineral springs in the High Alleghenies attracted Native Americans and 18th century white settlers and provided a modest incentive to the local economy. The spas developing around these geological features include celebrated resorts that continue to cater to an exclusive clientele, such as The Greenbrier (White Sulphur Springs, West Virginia; hotel built 1858) and The Homestead (Hot Springs, Virginia; original lodge built 1766).

== Ecology ==
=== Flora ===
The High Alleghenies are noted for their forests of red spruce, balsam fir, and mountain ash, trees typically found much farther north. Hardwood forests also include yellow birch (whose specific name Betula alleghaniensis refer to the mountain range), sugar and red maple, eastern hemlock, and black cherry. American beech, pine, oak, and hickory can also be found. Chestnut trees used to be dominant throughout the Alleghenies. In some areas, it made up as much as 25 to 50 percent of the canopy, now they are found as stump sprouts as a result of blight. The forests of the entire region are now almost all second- or third-growth forests, the original trees having been removed in the late 19th and (in West Virginia) early 20th centuries. The wild onion known as the ramp (Allium tricoccum) is also present in the deeper forests.

Certain isolated areas in the High Alleghenies are well known for their open expanses of sphagnum bogs and heath shrubs (e.g., Dolly Sods, Cranberry Glades). Many plant communities are indeed similar to those of sea-level eastern Canada. But the ecosystems within the Alleghenies are remarkably varied. In recent decades, the many stages of ecologic succession throughout the area have made the region one of enduring interest to botanists.

=== Fauna ===
The larger megafauna which once inhabited the High Alleghenies—elk, bison, mountain lion—were all exterminated during the 19th century. They survived longer in this area, however, than in other parts of the eastern United States. Naturalist John James Audubon reported that by 1851 a few eastern elk (Cervus canadensis canadiensis) could still be found in the Alleghany Mountains but that by then they were virtually gone from the remainder of their range. Mammals in the Allegheny region today include whitetail deer, chipmunk, raccoon, skunk, groundhog, opossum, weasel, field mouse, flying squirrel, cottontail rabbit, gray foxes, red foxes, gray squirrels, red squirrels and a cave bat. Bobcat, snowshoe hare, wild boar and black bear and coyote are also found in the forests and parks of the Alleghenies. Mink and beaver are much less often seen.

These mountains and plateau have over 20 species of reptiles represented as lizard, skink, turtle and snake. Some of the icterid birds visit the mountains as well as the hermit thrush and wood thrush. North American migrant birds live throughout the mountains during the warmer seasons. Occasionally, osprey and eagles can be found nesting along the streams. The hawks and owls are the most common birds of prey.

The water habitats of the Alleghenies hold 24 families of fish. Amphibian species number about 21, among them hellbenders, lungless salamanders, and various toads and frogs. The Alleghenies provide habitat for about 54 species of common invertebrate. These include Gastropoda, slugs, leech, earthworms and grub worm. Cave crayfish (Cambarus nerterius) live alongside a little over seven dozen cave invertebrates.

== History ==
=== Pre-contact Native Americans ===
The indigenous people inhabiting the Allegheny Mountains emerged from the greater region's archaic and mound building cultures, particularly the Adena and Eastern Woodland peoples with a later Hopewellian influence. These Late Middle Woodland culture people have been called the Montaine (c. AD 500 to 1000) culture. Their neighbors, the woodland Buck Garden culture, lived in the western valleys of the central Allegheny range. The Montaine sites extend from the tributaries of the upper Potomac River region south to the New River tributaries. These also were influenced by the earlier Armstrong culture of the more southwestern portions northern sub-range of the Ouasioto (Cumberland) Mountains and by the more easterly Virginia Woodland people. The Late Woodland Montaine were less influenced by Hopewellian trade from Ohio, although similarly polished stone tools have been found among the Montaine sites in the Tygart Valley. Small groups of Montaine people appear to have lingered much beyond their classically defined period in parts of the most mountainous valleys.

The watershed of the Monongahela River is within the northwestern Alleghenies, and it is from it that the Monongahela culture takes its name. The Godwin-Portman site (36AL39) located in Allegheny County, Pennsylvania, had a possible Fort Ancient (c. AD 850 to 1680) presence during the 15th century. Washington Boro ceramics have been found on the Barton (18AG3) and Llewellyn (18AG26) sites in Maryland on the northeastern slopes of the late Susquehannock sequence. The early Monongahela (c. AD 900 to 1630) are called the Drew Tradition in Pennsylvania. According to archeologist Richard L. George: "I believe that some of the Monongahela were of Algonquin origin.... Other scholars have suggested that Iroquoian speakers were interacting with Late Monongahela people, and additional evidence is presented to confirm this. I conclude that the archaeologically conceived term, Monongahela, likely encompasses speakers of several languages, including Siouan." According to Dr Maslowski of West Virginia in 2009: "The New River Drainage and upper Potomac represents the range of the Huffman Phase (Page) hunting and gathering area or when it is found in small amounts on village sites, trade ware or Page women being assimilated into another village (tribe)." Finally, according to Prof Potter of Virginia, they [the people represented by the Huffman Phase of Page pottery] had occupied the eastern slopes of the Alleghenies on the upper Potomac to the northern, lower Shenandoah Valley region before the AD 1300 Luray phase (Algonquian) peoples' "invasion". It is thought that these ancient Alleghenians were pushed from the classic Huffman Phase of the eastern slopes of the Alleghenies to the Blue Ridge Mountains in western Virginia, which was eastern Siouan territory.

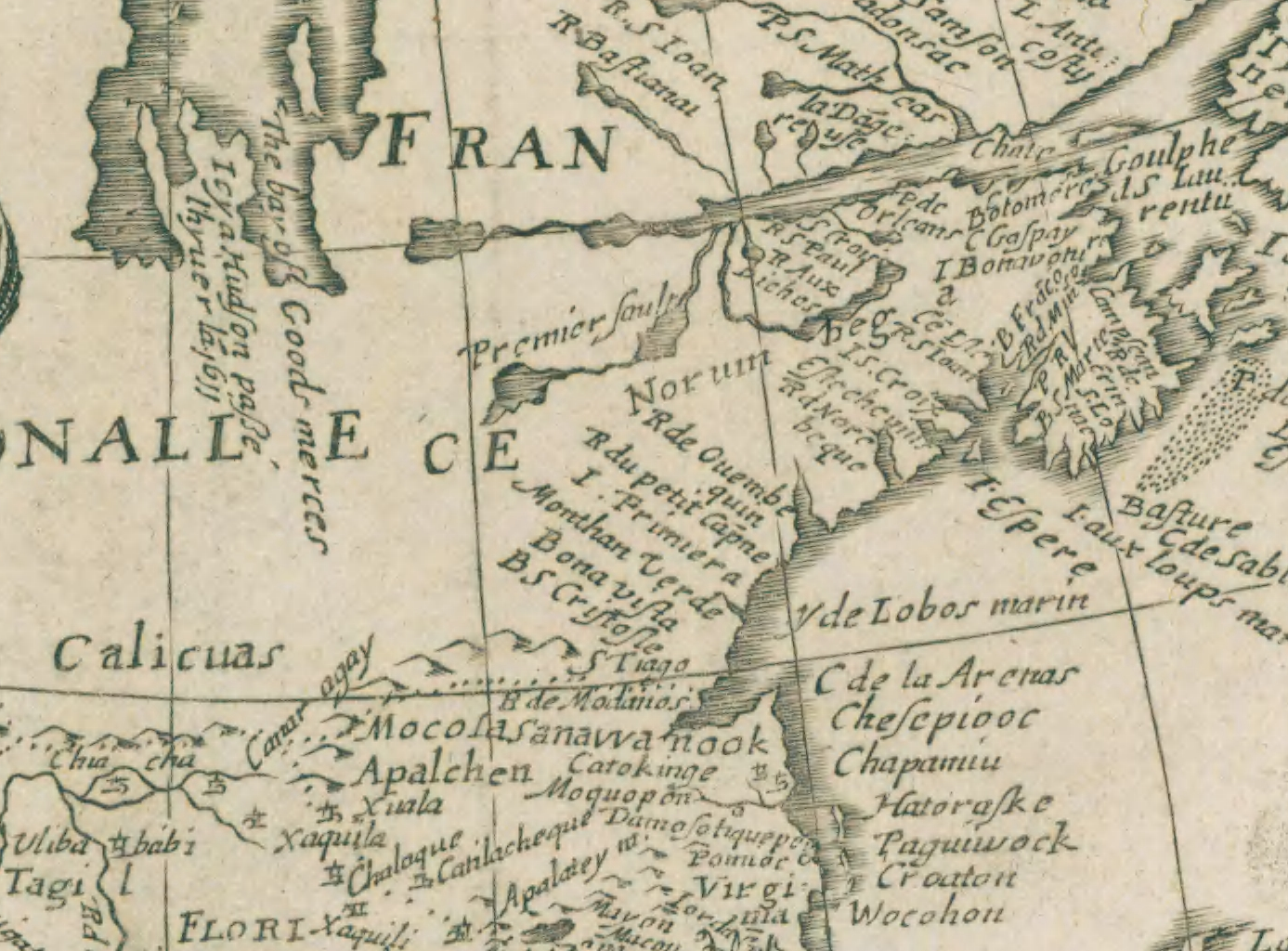
Detail of a French map of 1671. The Alleghenies are in the lower center portion.

In 1669, John Lederer and members of his party became the first Europeans to crest the Blue Ridge Mountains and the first to see the Shenandoah Valley and the Allegheny Mountains beyond.

=== Native Americans in the 17th century ===
The proto-historic Alleghenies can be exampled by the earliest journals of the colonists. According to Batts and Fallows' September, 1671 Expedition, they found Mehetan Indians of Mountain "Cherokee-Iroquois" mix on the New River tributaries. This journal does not identify the "Salt Village", but, that the "Mehetan" were associated with these and today thought to be "Monetons", Siouans. However, this journal does not identify the "Salt Village" below the Kanawha Falls, but, that simply the "Mehetan" were associated with these. He explained, below the "Salt Villages", a mass of hostile Indians had, implied, arrived and some believe these to be "Shanwans" of Vielles Expedition of 1692~94, ancient Shawnee. In 1669, John Lederer of Maryland for the Virginia Colony and the Tennessee Cherokee had visited the mouth of the Kanawha and reported no hostilities on the lower streams of the Alleghenies. The Mohetan representative through a Siouan translator explained to Mr Batts and Mr Fallon, Colonel Abraham Woods explorers 1671–72, that he (Moheton Native American) could not say much about the people below the "Salt Village" because they (Mountain Cherokee) were not associated with them. The Mohetan was armed by this time of 1671 for the Mohetan Representative was given several pouches of ammunition for his and the other's weapons as a token of friendship. Somebody had already been trading within the central Alleghenies before the Virginians' historical record begins in the Allegheny Mountains. Some earlier scholars found evidence these Proto-historics were either Cistercians of Spanish Ajacan Occuquan outpost on the Potomac River or Jesuits and their Kahnawake Praying Indians (Mohawk) on the Riviere de la Ronceverte. The "Kanawha Madonna" may date from this period or earlier. Where the New River breaks through Peters' Mountain—near Pearisburg, Virginia—the 1671 journal mentions the "Moketans had formerly lived".

According to a number of early 17th century maps, the Messawomeake or "Mincquas" (Dutch) occupied the northern Allegheny Mountains. The "Shatteras" (an ancient Tutelo) occupied the Ouasioto Mountains and the earliest term Canaraguy (Kanawhans otherwise Canawest) on the 1671 French map occupied the southerly Alleghenies. They were associated with the Allegheny "Cherokee" and Eastern Siouan as trade-movers and canoe transporters. The Calicuas, an ancient most northern Cherokee, migrated or was pushed from the Central Ohio Valley onto the north eastern slopes of the Alleghenies of the ancient Messawomeake, Iroquois tradesmen to 1630s Kent Island, by 1710 maps. Sometime before 1712, the Canawest ("Kanawhans"-"Canallaway"-"Canaragay") had moved to the upper Potomac and made a Treaty with the newly established trading post of Fort Conolloway which would become a part of western Maryland during the 1740s.

=== Trading posts and other settlements ===
Prior to European exploration and settlement, trails through the Alleghenies had been transited for many generations by American Indian tribes such as the Iroquois, Shawnee, Delaware, Catawba and others, for purposes of trade, hunting and, especially, warfare. Western Virginia "Cherokee" were reported at Cherokee Falls, today's Valley Falls of the Tygart Valley. Indian trader Charles Poke's trading post dates from 1731 with the Calicuas of Cherokee Falls still in the region from the previous century.

The "London Scribes" (The Crown's taxation records) vaguely mentions the colonial Alleghenian location of only a few other early colonial trading locations. A general knowledge of these few outposts are more of traditional telling of some local people. However, an example is the "Van Metre" trading house mentioned in an earlier edition of the "Wonderful West Virginia Magazine" being on the South Branches of the upper reaches of the Potomac. Another very early trading house appears on a lower Greenbrier Valley map during the earlier decades of the 18th century.

As early as 1719, new arrivals from Europe began to cross the lower Susquehanna River and settle illegally in defiance of the Board of Property in Pennsylvania, on un-warranted land of the northeastern drainage rivers of the Allegheny Mountains. Several Indian Nations requested the removal of "Maryland Intruders". Some of these moved onward as territory opened up beyond the Alleghenies.

The first permanent European settlers west of the Alleghenies have traditionally been considered to have been two New Englanders: Jacob Marlin and Stephen Sewell, who arrived in the Greenbrier Valley in 1749. They built a cabin together at what would become Marlinton, West Virginia, but after disputing over religion, Sewell moved into a nearby hollowed-out sycamore tree. In 1751, surveyor John Lewis (father of Andrew Lewis) discovered the pair. Sewell eventually settled on the eastern side of Sewell Mountain, near present-day Rainelle, West Virginia. They may well have been the first to settle what was then called the "western waters"—i.e., in the regions where streams flowed westward to the Gulf of Mexico rather than eastward to the Atlantic.

=== First surveys ===
The Fry-Jefferson Map (1751) prominently features "The Allagany Ridge of Mountains".

Among the first whites to penetrate into the Allegheny Mountains were surveyors attempting to settle a dispute over the extent of lands belonging to either Thomas Fairfax, 6th Lord Fairfax of Cameron or to the English Privy Council. An expedition of 1736 by John Savage established the location of the source of the North Branch Potomac River. In March 1742, a frontiersman named John Howard—along with his son and others—had been commissioned by Governor Gooch to explore the southwest of Virginia as far as the Mississippi River. Following Cedar Creek through the Natural Bridge, they floated in buffalo-skin boats down the New, Coal, Kanawha, and Ohio Rivers to the Mississippi. Although captured by the French before he reached Natchez, Howard was eventually released and (in 1745) was interviewed by Fairfax. Howard's description of the South Branch Potomac River resulted in the definite decision by Fairfax to secure his lands in the region. An expedition under Peter Jefferson and Thomas Lewis in the following year emplaced the "Fairfax Stone" at the source of the North Branch and established a line of demarcation (the "Fairfax Line") extending from the stone south-east to the headwaters of the Rappahannock River. Lewis' journal of that expedition provides a valuable view of the Allegheny country before its settlement. Jefferson and Joshua Fry's "Fry-Jefferson Map" of 1751 accurately depicted the Alleghenies for the first time. In the following decades, pioneer settlers arrived in the Alleghenies, especially during Colonial Virginia's Robert Dinwiddie era (1751–1758). These included squatters by the Quit-rent Law. Some had preceded the official surveyors using a "hack on the tree and field of corn" marking land ownership approved by the Virginia Colonial Governor who had to be replaced with Governor John Murray, 4th Earl of Dunmore.

=== Proclamation Line of 1763 ===
The Royal Proclamation of 1763, issued by King George III of Great Britain, followed a few months after the Treaty of Paris (1763), which formally ended the Seven Years' War and transferred French territory in North America to Great Britain. The Proclamation set a geographical limit that (at least temporarily) forbade all new settlements west of a line drawn along the crest of the Appalachian Mountains, which was delineated as an Indian Reserve. Extending from New England in the north to Georgia in the south, the Proclamation Line effectively bisected the Alleghenies by more or less following the Eastern Continental Divide through the region.

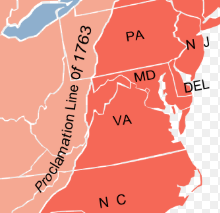
The Mid-Atlantic portion of the Proclamation Line of 1763 effectively bisected the Alleghenies.

The Proclamation Line was not intended to be a permanent boundary between the colonists and Native American lands but rather a temporary boundary that could be extended further west in an orderly, lawful manner. It was also not designed as an uncrossable boundary; people could cross the line, but not settle past it. Its contour was defined by the headwaters that formed the watershed along the crest of the mountains. All land with rivers that flowed into the Atlantic was designated for the colonial entities. In contrast, all the land with rivers that flowed into the Mississippi was reserved for the Native American populations. The Proclamation outlawed the private purchase of Native American land, which had often created problems. Instead, all future land purchases were to be made by Crown officials "at some public Meeting or Assembly of the said Indians". British colonials were forbidden to settle on native lands, and colonial officials were forbidden to grant ground or lands without royal approval. Organized land companies asked for land grants, but this was denied by King George III.

British colonists and land speculators objected to the proclamation boundary since the British government had already assigned land grants to them. Including the wealthy owners of the Ohio company, who protested the line to the governor of Virginia, as they had plans to settle the land to grow the business. Indeed, many settlements already existed beyond the Proclamation Line, some of which were temporarily evacuated during Pontiac's War (1763-1766) and there were many already granted land claims yet to be settled. For example, George Washington and his Virginia soldiers had been granted lands past the boundary. Prominent American colonials joined with the land speculators in Britain to lobby the government to move the line further west. The colonists' demands were met and the boundary line was adjusted in a series of treaties with the Native Americans.

Even the temporary exclusion of settlers from this vast region created significant discontent between Britain and colonial land speculators and potential settlers. Many colonists disregarded the Proclamation Line and its successors and settled in the west, creating more tension between them and the Native Americans. The Proclamation and access to western lands was one of the first major areas of dispute between Britain and the Thirteen Colonies and became a contributing factor leading to the American Revolution.

=== First roads ===
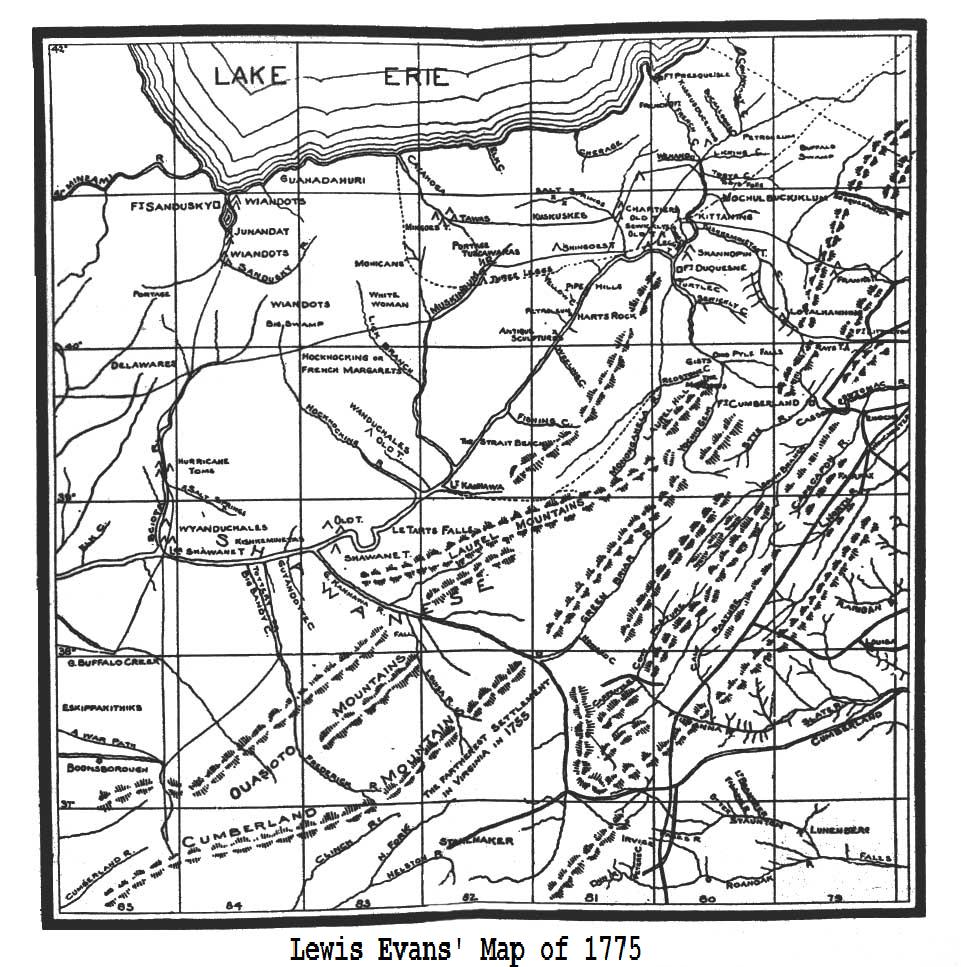
A 1775 map of the Allegheny Plateau and Mountain Range

Trans-Allegheny travel had been facilitated when a military trail—Braddock Road—was blazed and opened by the Ohio Company in 1751. (It followed an earlier Indian and pioneer trail known as Nemacolin's Path.) Braddock Road connected Cumberland, Maryland (the upper limit of navigation on the Potomac River) and the forks of the Ohio River (the future Pittsburgh, Pennsylvania). It received its name from General Edward Braddock, the British commander of the North American phase of the Seven Years' War — known locally as the French and Indian War (1754–1763) — who led the ill-fated Braddock expedition four years later.

In addition to the war, hunting and trading with Indians were primary motivations for white movement across the mountains. Permanent white settlement of the northern Alleghenies was facilitated by the explorations and stories of such noted Marylanders as the Indian fighter and trader Thomas Cresap (1702–1790) and the backwoodsman and hunter Meshach Browning (1781–1859). In the late 18th century, a massive migration to the Monongahela River basin took place over three main routes: along the old Braddock Road via Winchester, Virginia; through the Shenandoah Valley to the head of the Cheat River and from there to the Monongahela; and along the Lincoln Highway to Ligonier, Pennsylvania, and thence along Jacob's Creek to the Monongahela. These immigrants were predominantly Scotch-Irish, German, and, to a lesser extent, British stock.

The Braddock Road was superseded by the Cumberland Road—also called the National Road—one of the first major improved highways in the United States to be built by the federal government. Construction began in 1811 at Cumberland and the road reached Wheeling, Virginia (now West Virginia) on the Ohio River in 1818. Just to the south, the state-funded Staunton and Parkersburg Turnpike was constructed to provide a direct route for the settlements of the Shenandoah Valley to the Ohio River by way of the Tygart Valley and Little Kanawha Rivers. Planned and approved in 1826 and completed in 1848, the Staunton and Parkersburg was maintained by fees (tolls) collected at toll houses placed at regular intervals.

=== First railroads and canals ===
Construction on the Baltimore and Ohio Railroad began at Baltimore in 1828; the B&O traversed the Alleghenies, changing the economy and society of the Mountains forever. The B&O had reached Martinsburg, (West) Virginia, by May 1842, Hancock, (West) Virginia, by June, Cumberland, Maryland, on November 5, 1842, Piedmont, (West) Virginia, on July 21, 1851, and Fairmont, (West) Virginia, on June 22, 1852. (It finally reached its Ohio River terminus at Wheeling, (West) Virginia, on January 1, 1853.)

The Chesapeake and Ohio Canal—also begun in 1828, but at Georgetown—was also a public work of enormous economic and social significance for the Alleghenies. It approached Hancock, Maryland, by 1839. From the beginning, the B&O Railroad and the Chesapeake and Ohio Canal operated in bitter legal and commercial competition with one another as they vied for rights to the narrow strips of land along the Potomac. When the Canal finally reached Cumberland in 1850, the Railroad had already arrived eight years before. Debt-ridden, the Canal company dropped its plan to continue construction of the next 180 miles (290 km) of the Canal into the Ohio Valley. The company had long realized—especially with the difficult experience of digging the Paw Paw Tunnel—that the original plan of construction over the mountains and all the way down the Youghiogheny River to Pittsburgh was "wildly unrealistic".

Public works financed at the state level were not lacking during this period. The Main Line of Public Works was a transportation network project built between 1826 and 1834 by the Commonwealth of Pennsylvania. It created a railroad and canal system across southern Pennsylvania between Philadelphia and Pittsburgh, intended to transport freight (notably including anthracite coal) and people with greater reliability, speed and capacity. The Main Line of Public Works included the Philadelphia and Columbia Railroad, the Allegheny Portage Railroad and the Pennsylvania Canal system.

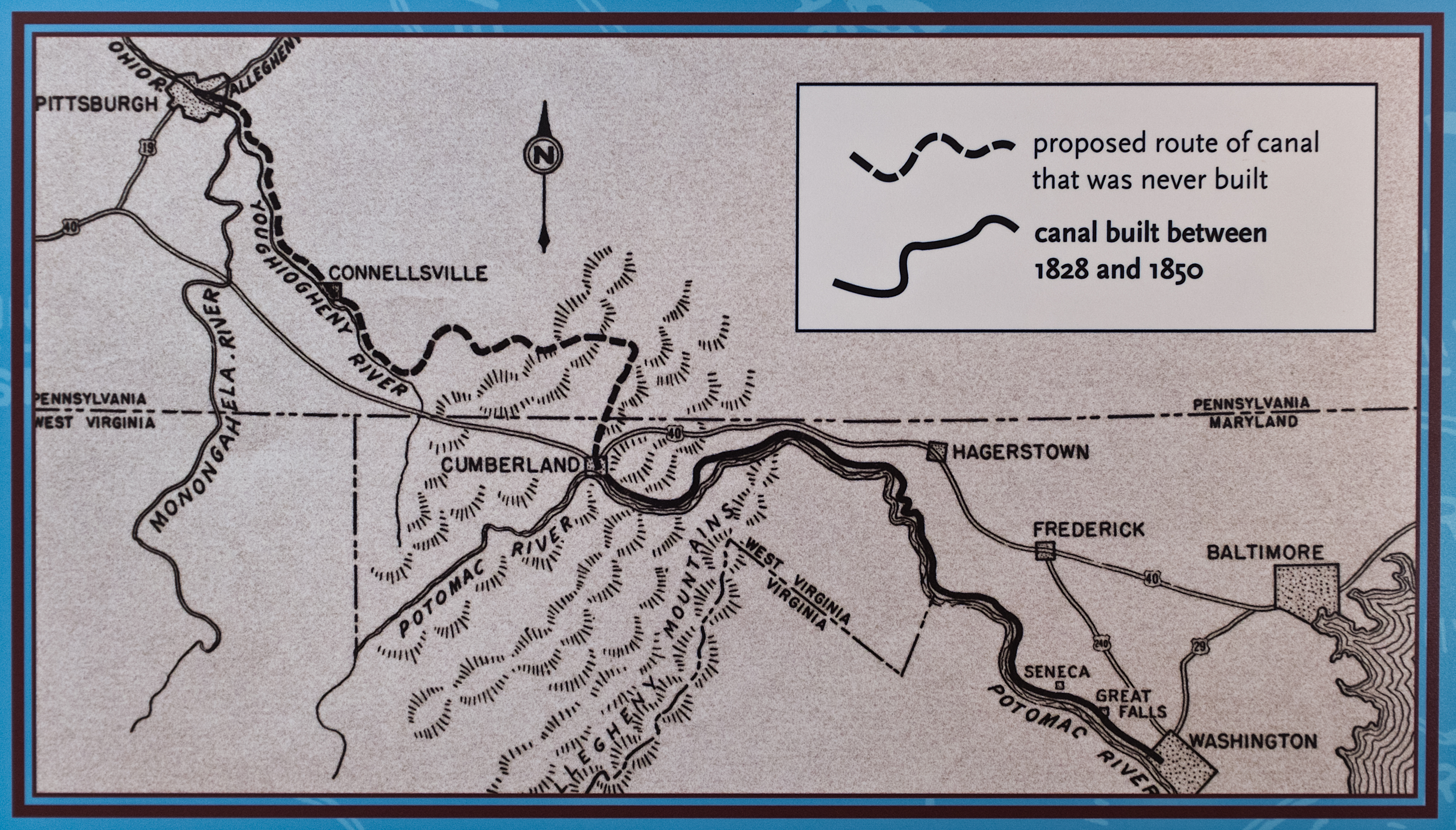
Actual and proposed routes of the C&O Canal through the Alleghenies

=== Civil War ===
Lying astride the border separating the Union and Confederacy, the Alleghenies were among the areas most directly affected by the American Civil War (1861–1865). One of the earliest campaigns of the War was fought for control of the Staunton and Parkersburg Turnpike and for the access it provided to the B&O Railroad. The Battle of Rich Mountain (July 11, 1861) gave the Federals control of the turnpike, of Tygart's Valley, and of all of the territory of western Virginia to the north and west, including the railroad. (Union General George McClellan's victory in this theater would ultimately bring him promotion to commander the Army of the Potomac.) The Federals fortified at Cheat Summit, and the Confederates established strongholds at Camp Bartow and Camp Allegheny. Here they faced each other warily through the fall of 1861 and the following winter. General Robert E. Lee's attempt to attack Cheat Summit Fort (September 12–15, 1861) and Federal attempts to attack Bartow and Allegheny, all failed to change the strategic stalemate. Finally, the harsh, high elevation winter achieved what the troops had failed to accomplish, and in the spring of 1862 both armies moved on down the pike to the Battle of McDowell (May 8, 1862), and then on to fight what became General Stonewall Jackson's Shenandoah Valley Campaign (spring 1862). Two years later, much of this contested area (along with much else) became part of the new state of West Virginia. The very rugged terrain of the Alleghenies was not at all amenable to a large-scale maneuver war and so the actions that the area witnessed for the remainder of the conflict were generally guerrilla in nature.

=== Coal and timber industries ===
With the further spread of the railroad networks in the 1890s and early 1900s, many new towns developed and thrived in the Alleghenies. The lumbering and coal industries that boomed in the wake of the railroads brought a measure of prosperity to the region, but most of the revenues flowed out of the mountains to the cities of the eastern seaboard where the captains of industry were headquartered. This inequity created a bitter legacy that would last for generations and form the foundation of the mountaineers' poverty and the area's immense environmental degradation.

The most momentous disaster to afflict the people of the Alleghenies was the Johnstown Flood—locally known as the "Great Flood of 1889"—which occurred on May 31 of that year after the catastrophic failure of the South Fork Dam on the Little Conemaugh River 14 miles (23 km) upstream of the town of Johnstown, Pennsylvania. The dam broke after several days of extremely heavy rainfall, unleashing 20 million tons of water (18 million cubic meters) from the reservoir known as Lake Conemaugh. (This body of water had been built as part of the Main Line of Public Works, then abandoned.) With a flow rate that temporarily equalled that of the Mississippi River, the flood killed 2,209 people and caused US$17 million of damage (about $425 million in 2012 dollars). The American Red Cross, led by Clara Barton and with 50 volunteers, undertook a major disaster relief effort. Support for victims came from all over the United States and 18 foreign countries. After the flood, survivors suffered a series of legal defeats in their attempts to recover damages from the dam's owners. Public indignation at that failure prompted the development in American law changing a fault-based regime to strict liability.

=== 20th century ===
In the 1920s and '30s, Allegheny highways were extensively paved to provide access for automobiles.

The suffering occasioned by the Great Depression led to a major social experiment in 1933 aimed at providing opportunities for unemployed local miners and farmers. Construction of the settlement of Arthurdale, West Virginia was undertaken by the short-lived Subsistence Homesteads Division and with the personal involvement of First Lady Eleanor Roosevelt, who used her influence to win government approval for the scheme. The aim was to encourage self-sufficiency and reduce dependence on both market forces and welfare provision. The experiment failed through a clash of ideologies, between a strong emphasis on accommodating those most in need yet also having qualifications to ensure that the community would be self-governed in a professional manner. The entrepreneurial community spirit never took hold, and the project is generally remembered as a classic failure, though some of its original residents continued to defend its principles.

From the 1950s to 1992, the United States government maintained a top secret continuity program known as Project Greek Island at The Greenbrier hotel in the Alleghenies of southern West Virginia.

In August 1963, at the March on Washington for Jobs and Freedom, Dr. Martin Luther King Jr. referenced the Alleghenies—among several in an evocative list of mountains—in his famous "I Have a Dream" speech, when he said "Let freedom ring from the heightening Alleghenies of Pennsylvania!"

=== 21st century ===
The Flight 93 National Memorial is located at the site of the crash of United Airlines Flight 93—which was hijacked in the September 11 attacks—in Stonycreek Township, Pennsylvania, about 2 miles (3.2 km) north of Shanksville. The memorial honors the passengers and crew of Flight 93, who stopped Al-Qaeda terrorists from reaching their intended target.

== Photo gallery ==
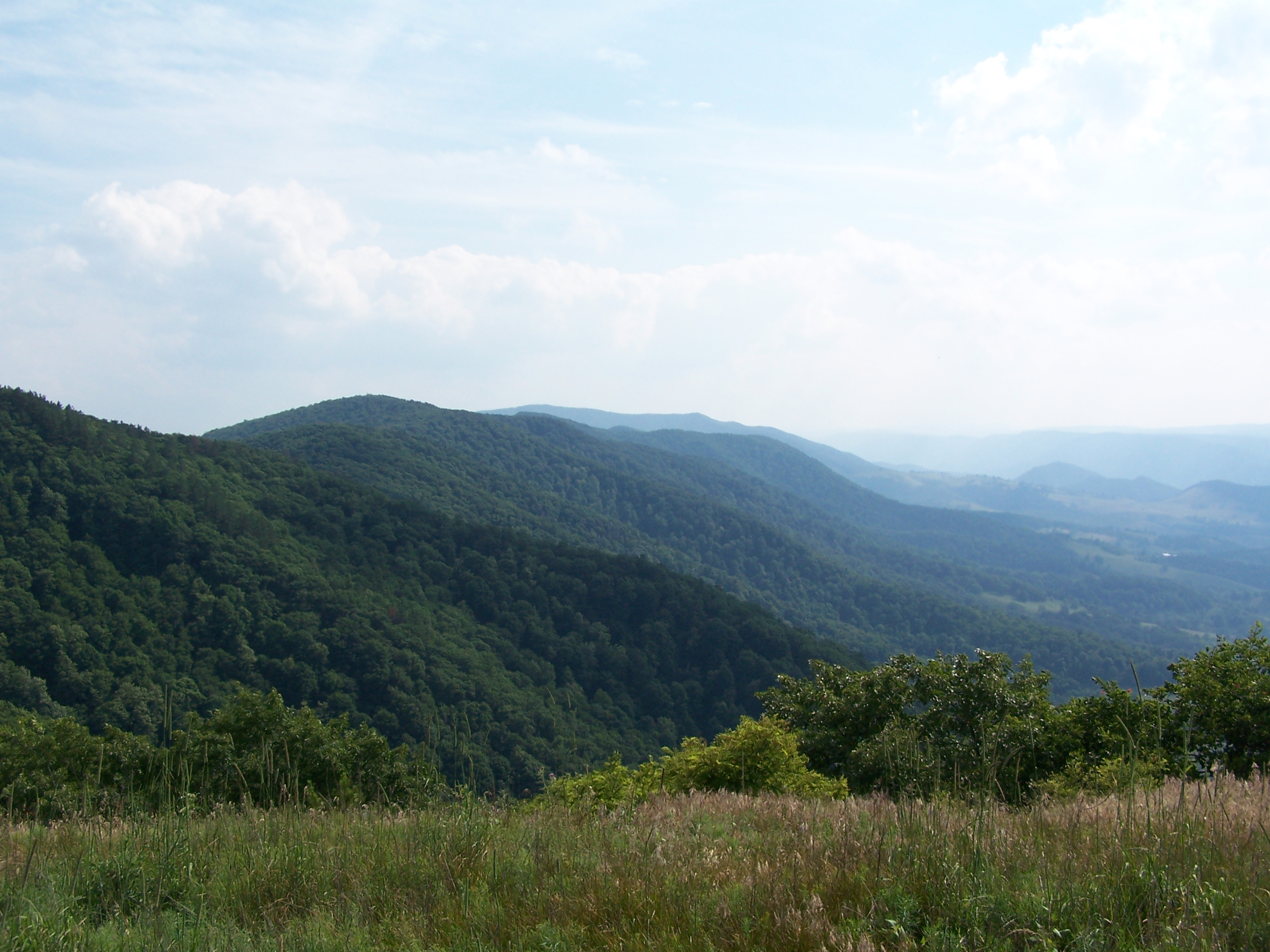
North Fork Mountain in West Virginia, looking south

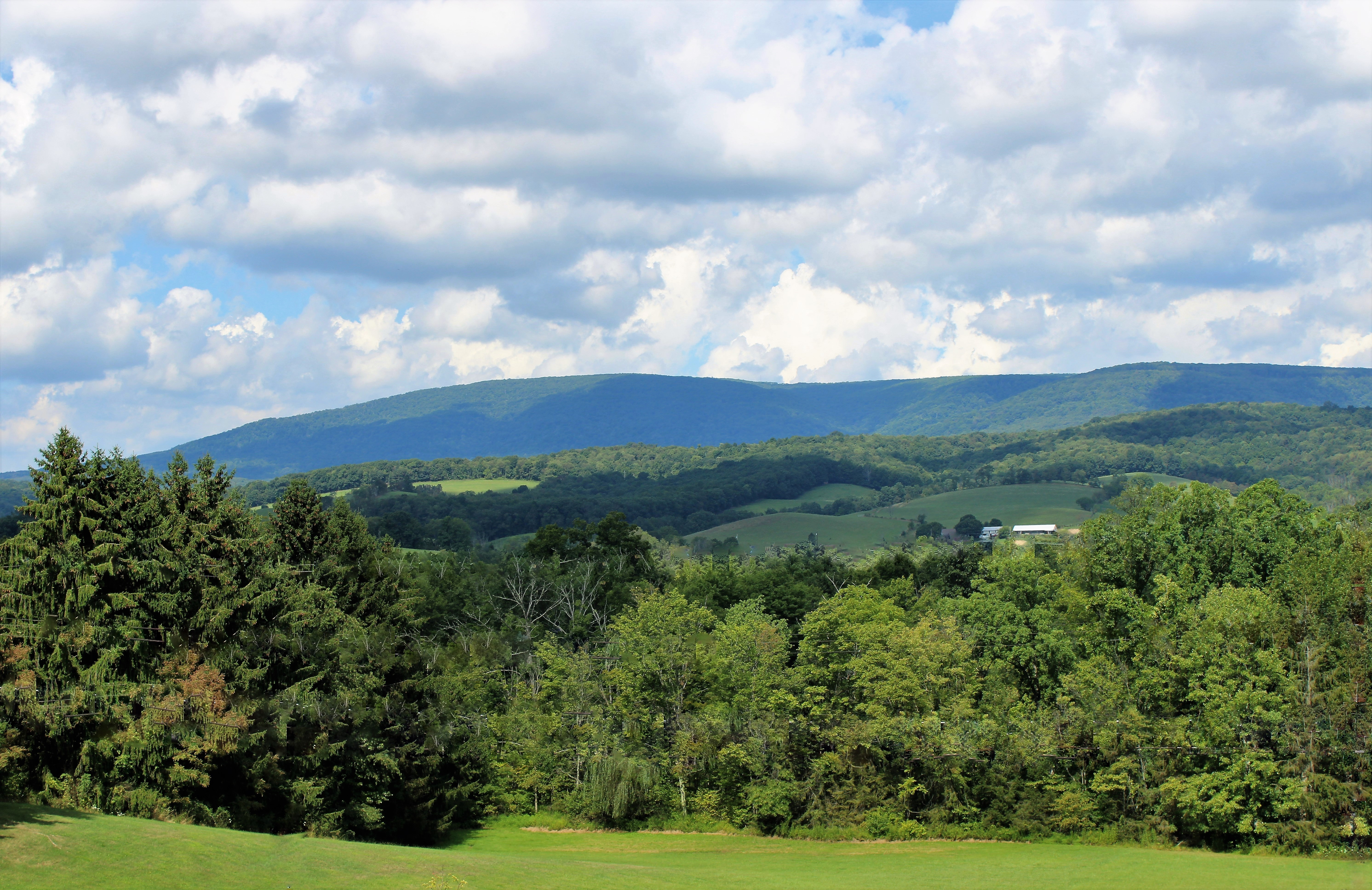
Blue Knob, the most northern 3,000 footer in the Allegheny Mountains

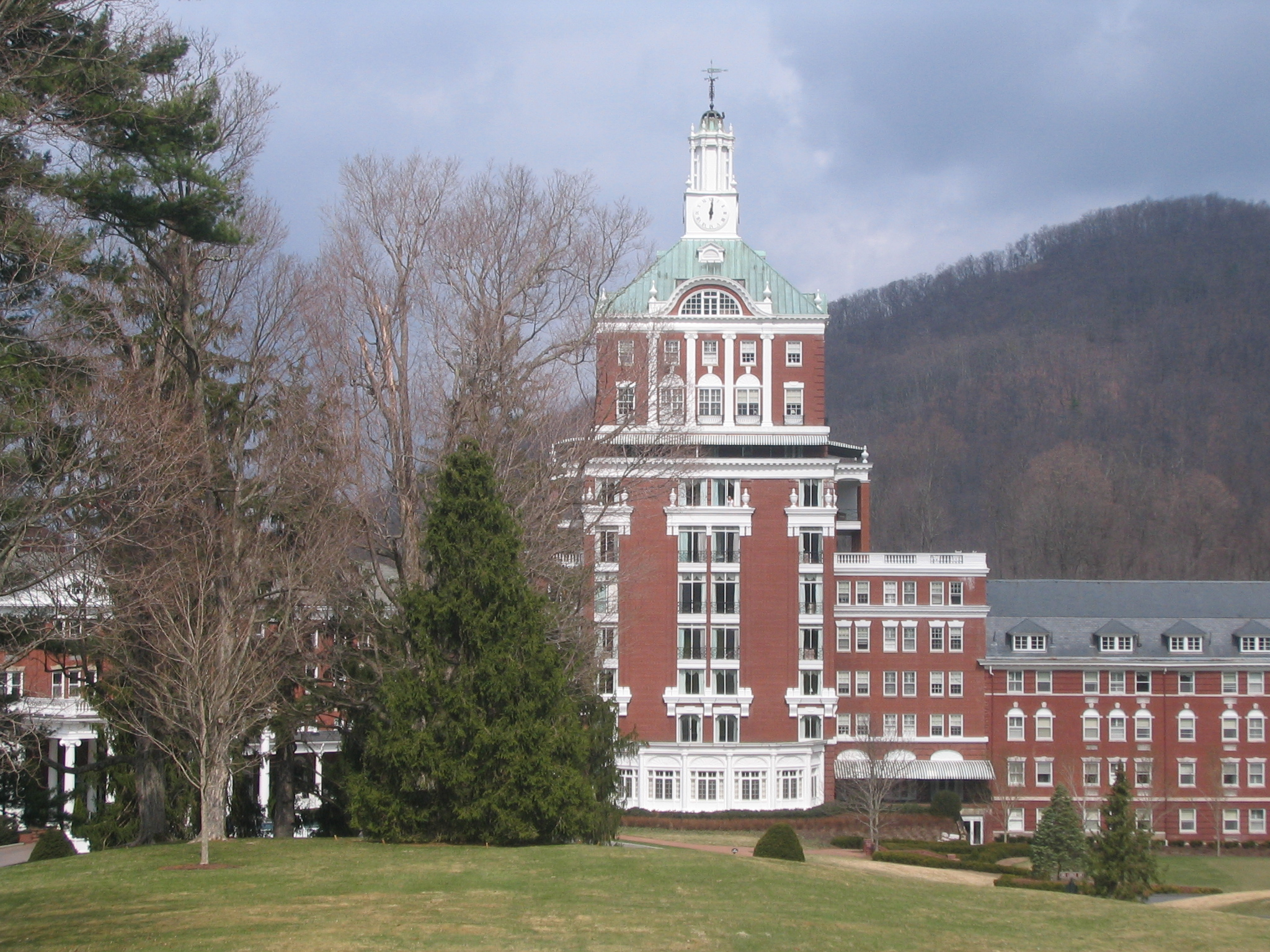
The Homestead, Hot Springs, Virginia, has catered to spa enthusiasts since 1766.

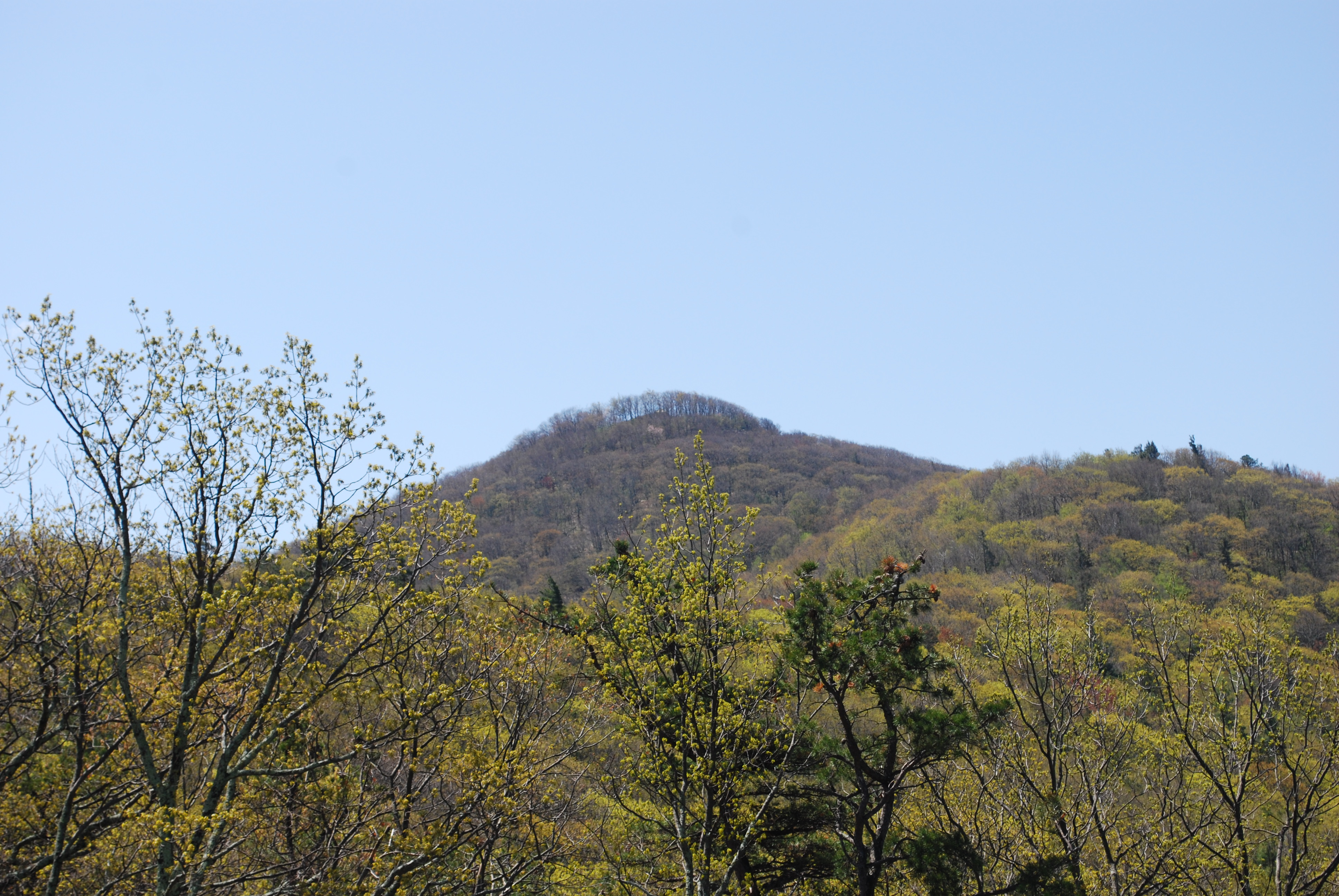
Shenandoah Mountain, at the easternmost limit of the Alleghenies

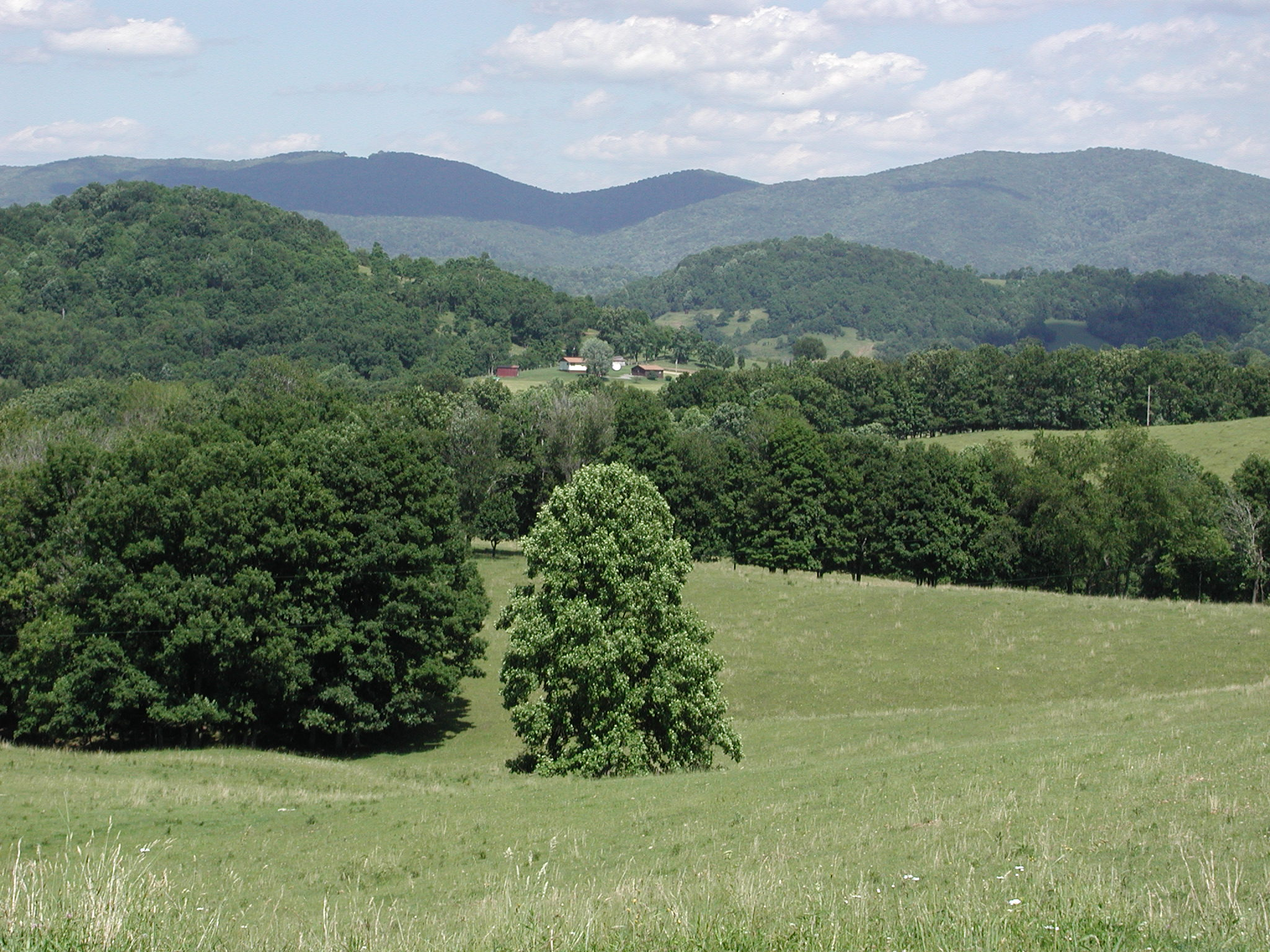
Laurel Mountain, West Virginia, at the westernmost limit of the Alleghenies

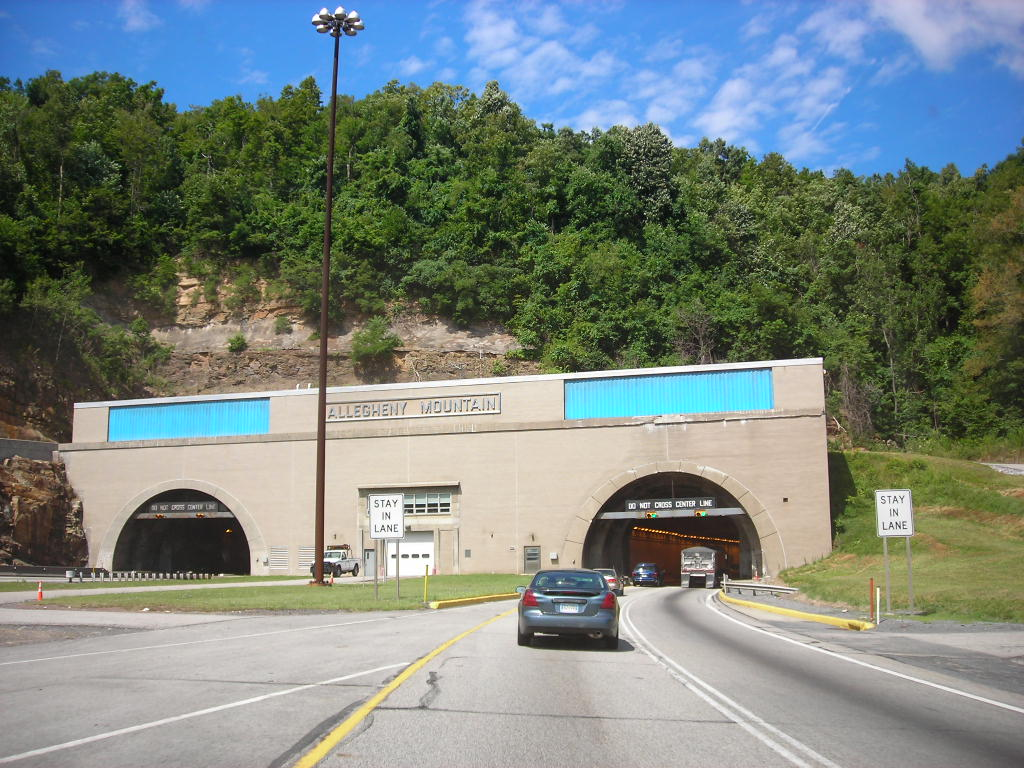
Allegheny Mountain Tunnel, through Allegheny Mountain, services Interstate 76 in Pennsylvania

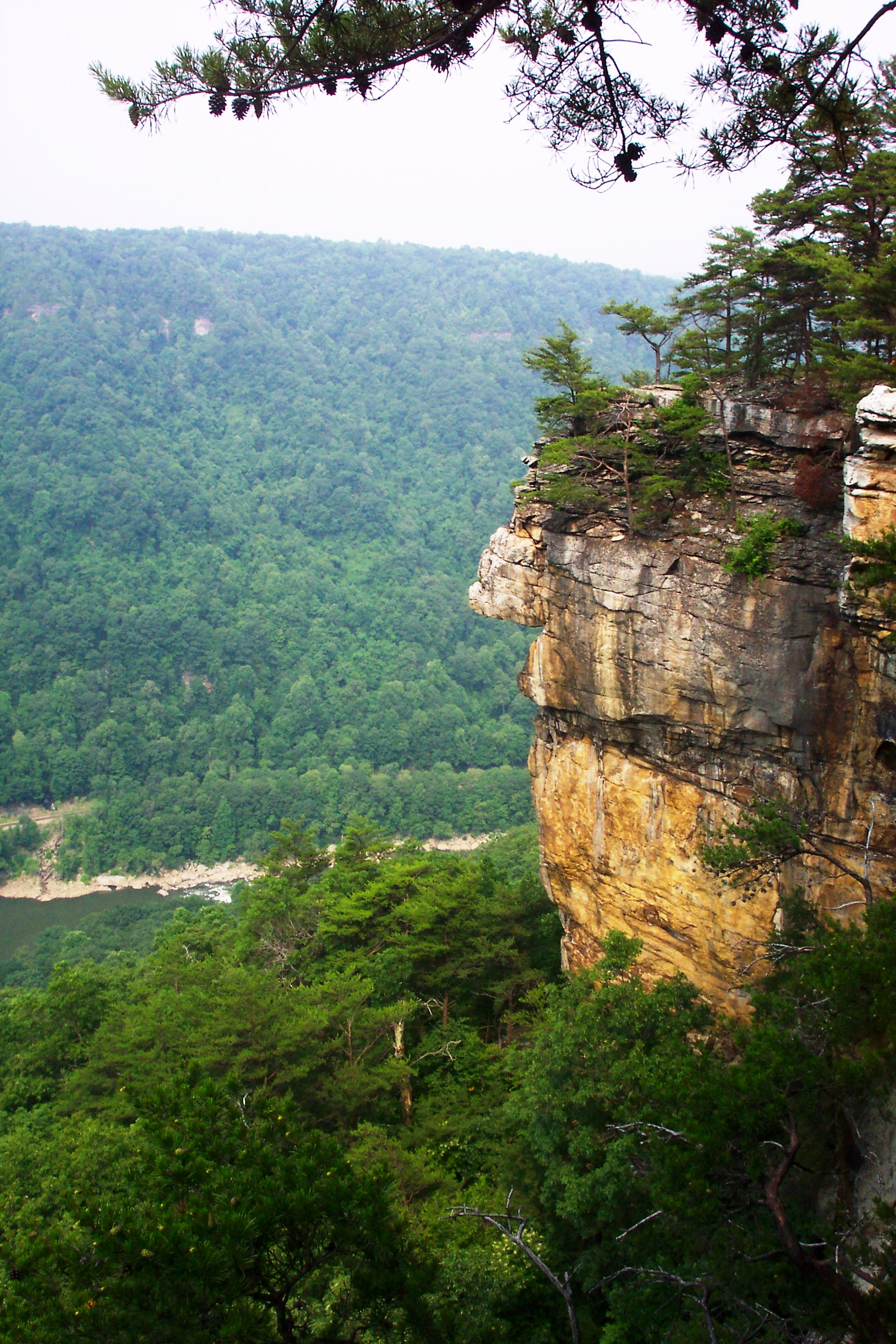
New River Gorge, section of the cliff at Endless Wall cliff

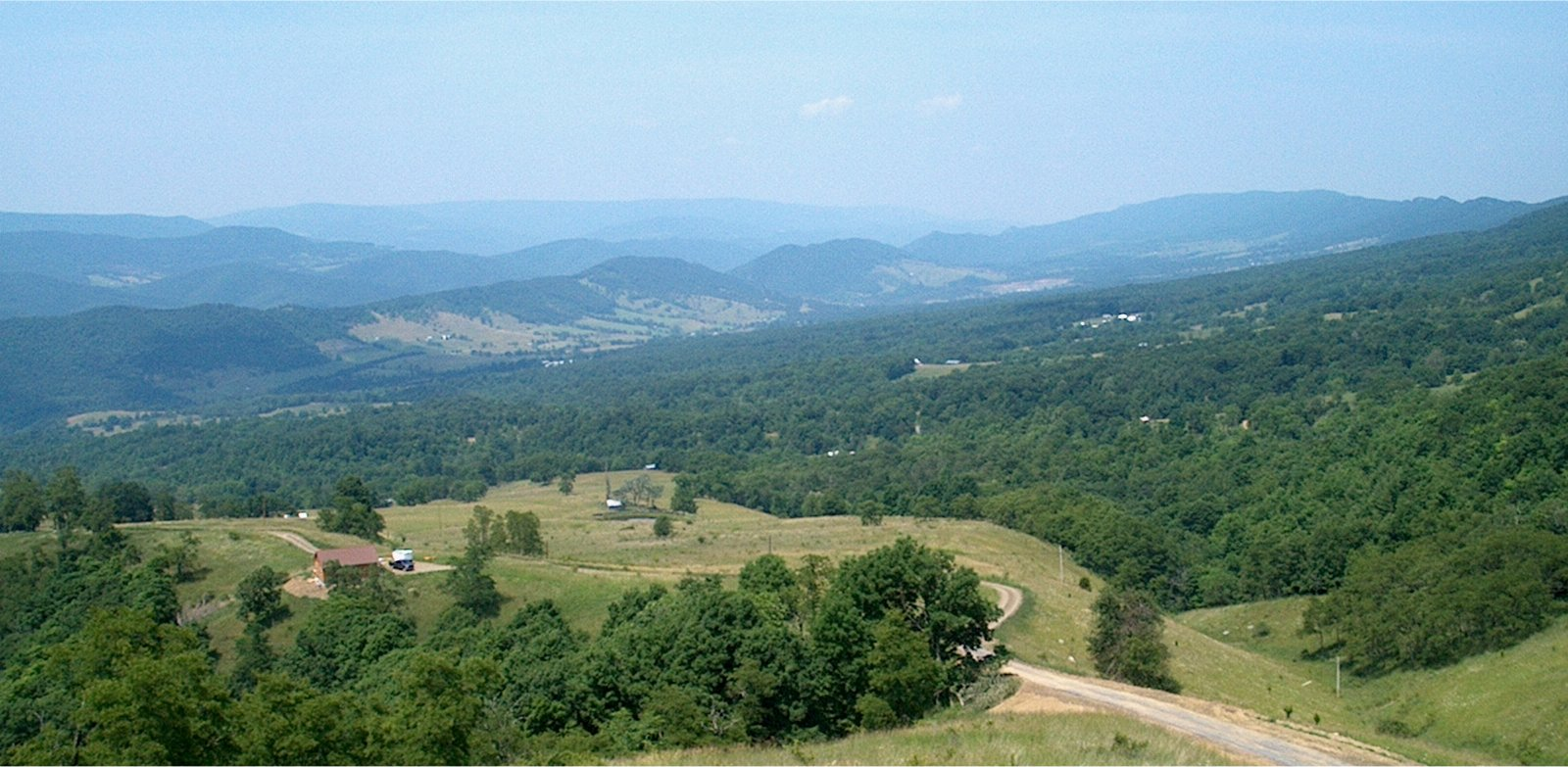
Germany Valley, a scenic upland valley of eastern West Virginia

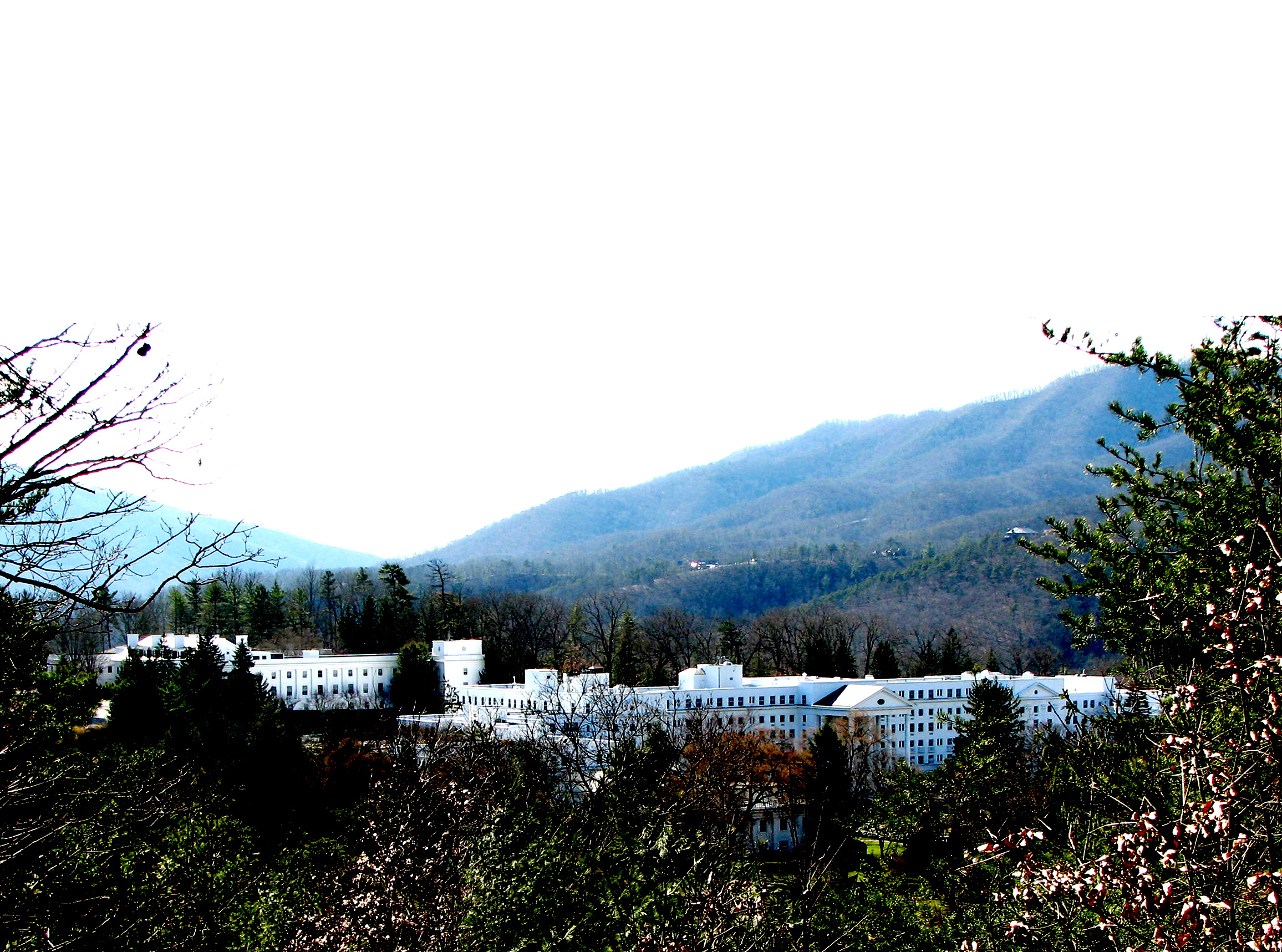
The grand hotel at The Greenbrier, White Sulphur Springs, West Virginia, built in 1858

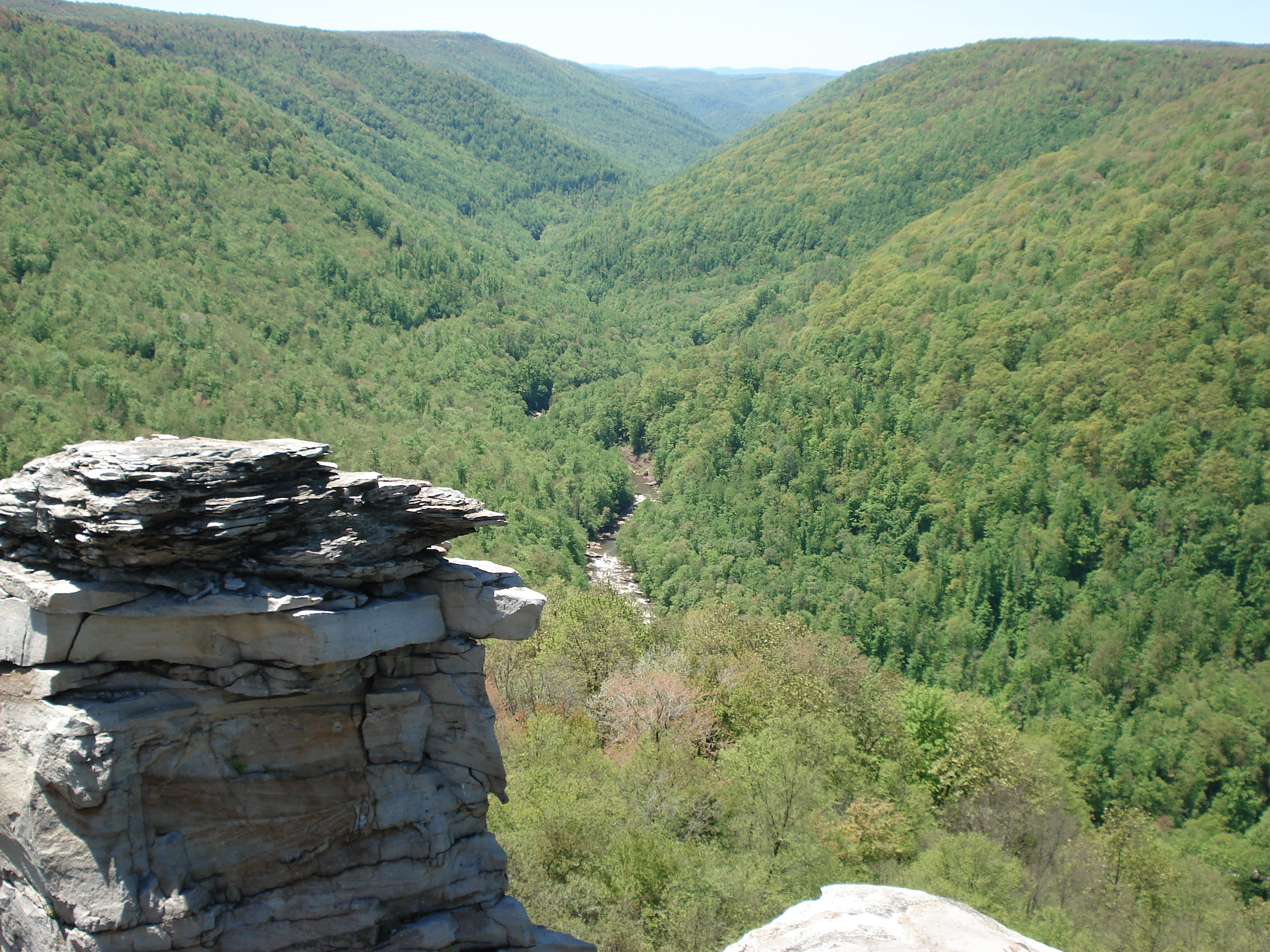
The Blackwater Canyon, a rugged gorge in eastern West Virginia

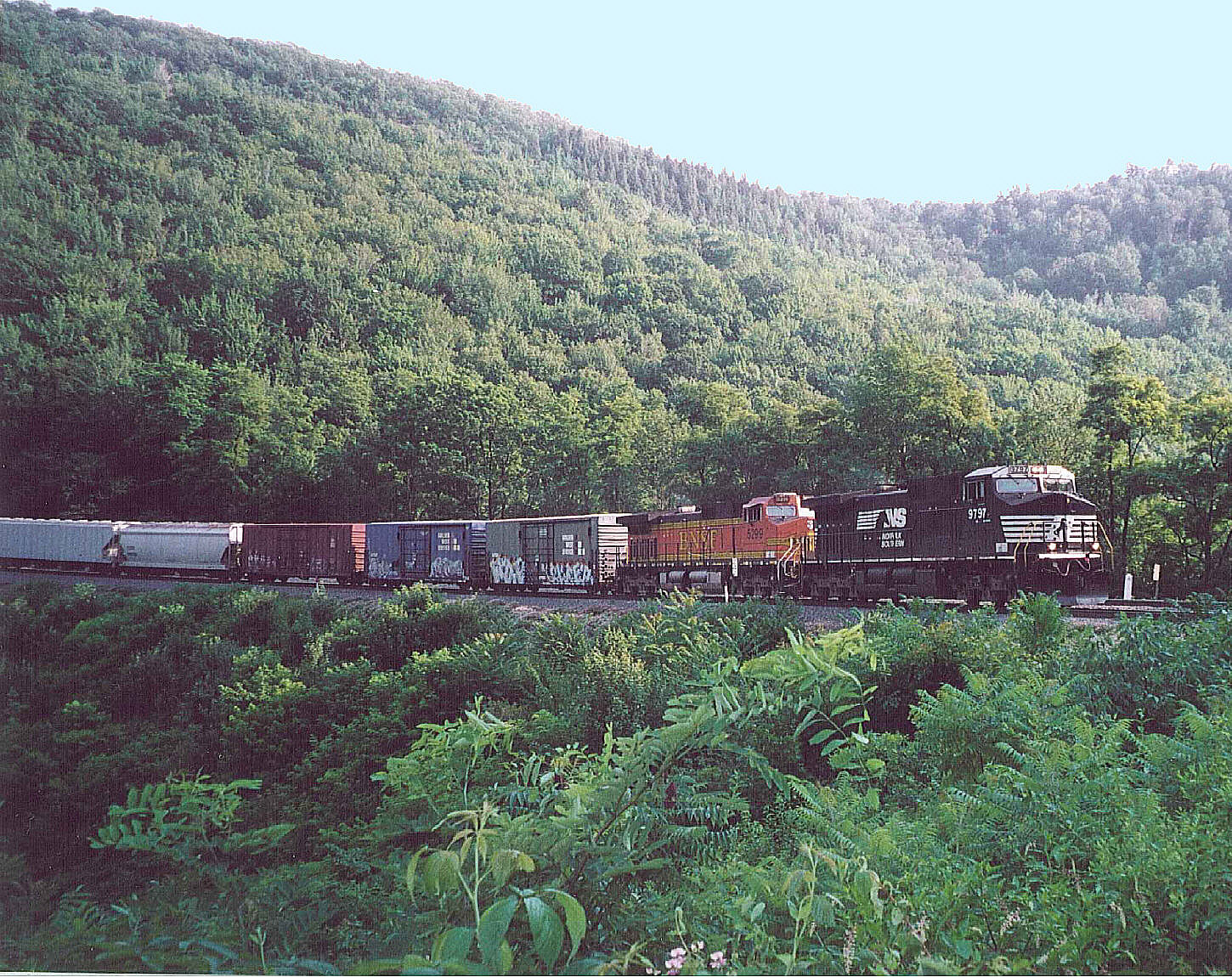
A Norfolk Southern train at Horseshoe Curve near Altoona, Pennsylvania

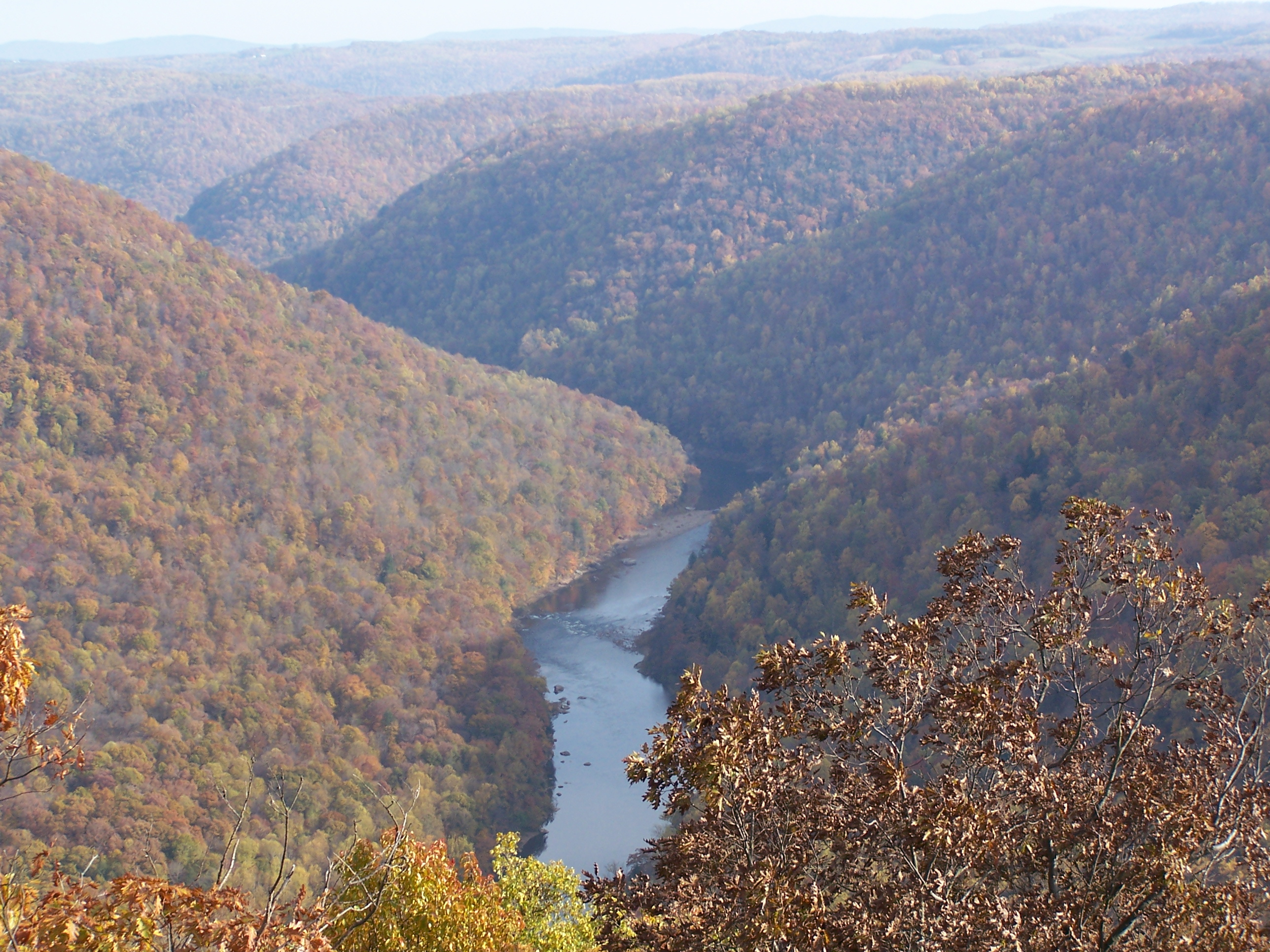
Cheat Canyon, in Coopers Rock State Forest, northeastern West Virginia

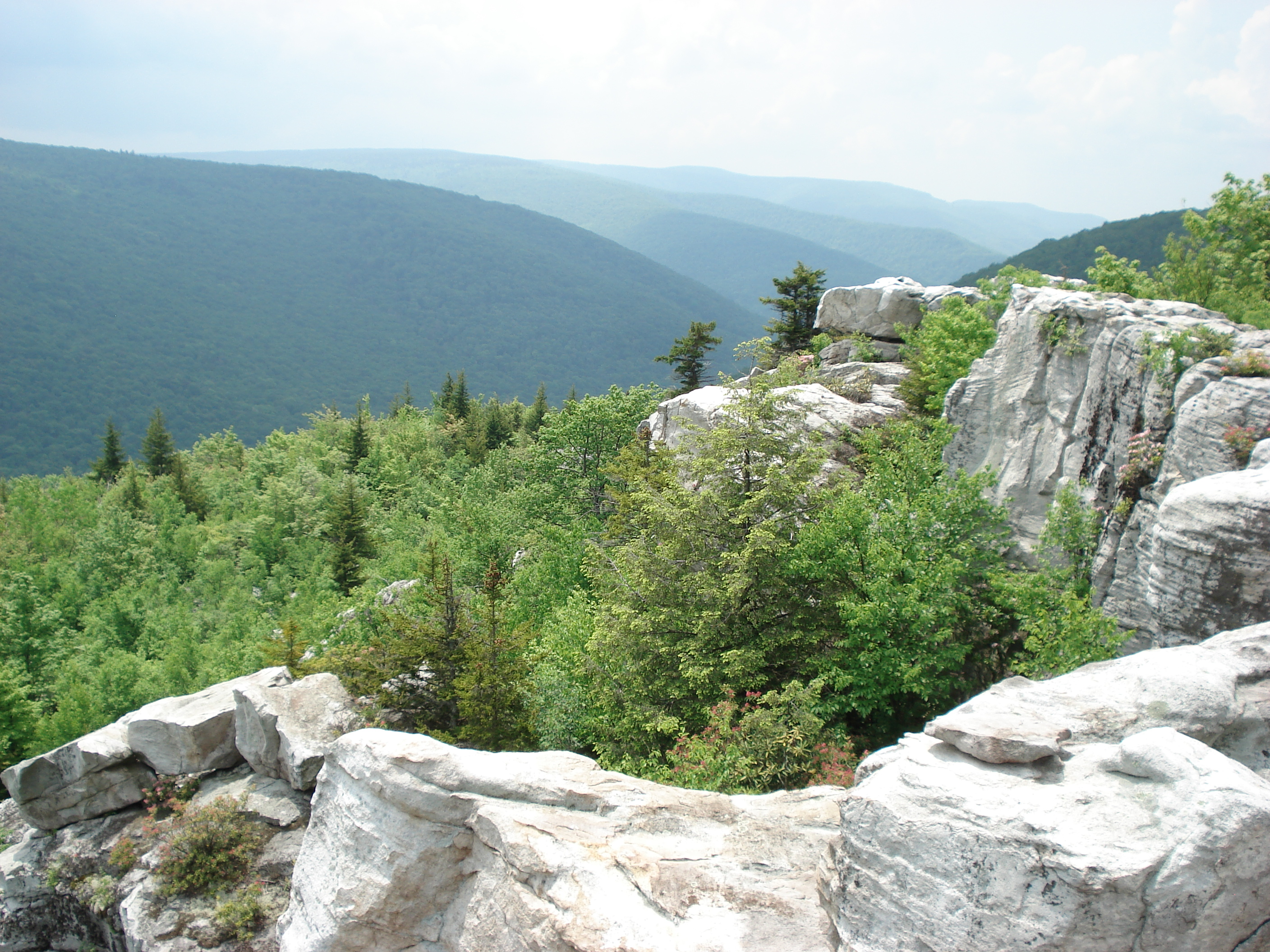
Dolly Sods Wilderness in West Virginia, seen from atop Breathed Mountain

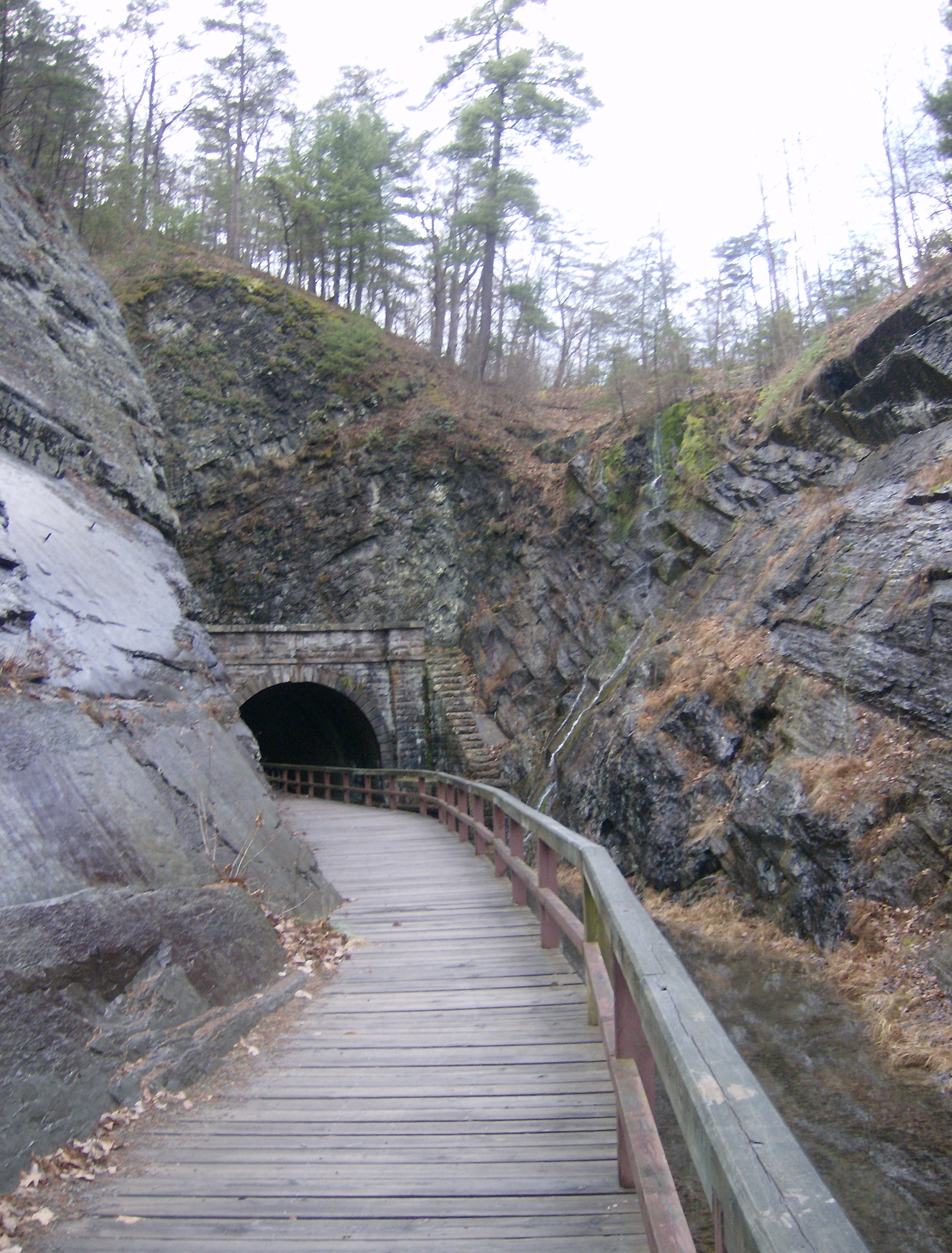
Eastern entrance to the Paw Paw Tunnel on the Chesapeake and Ohio Canal towpath in Maryland

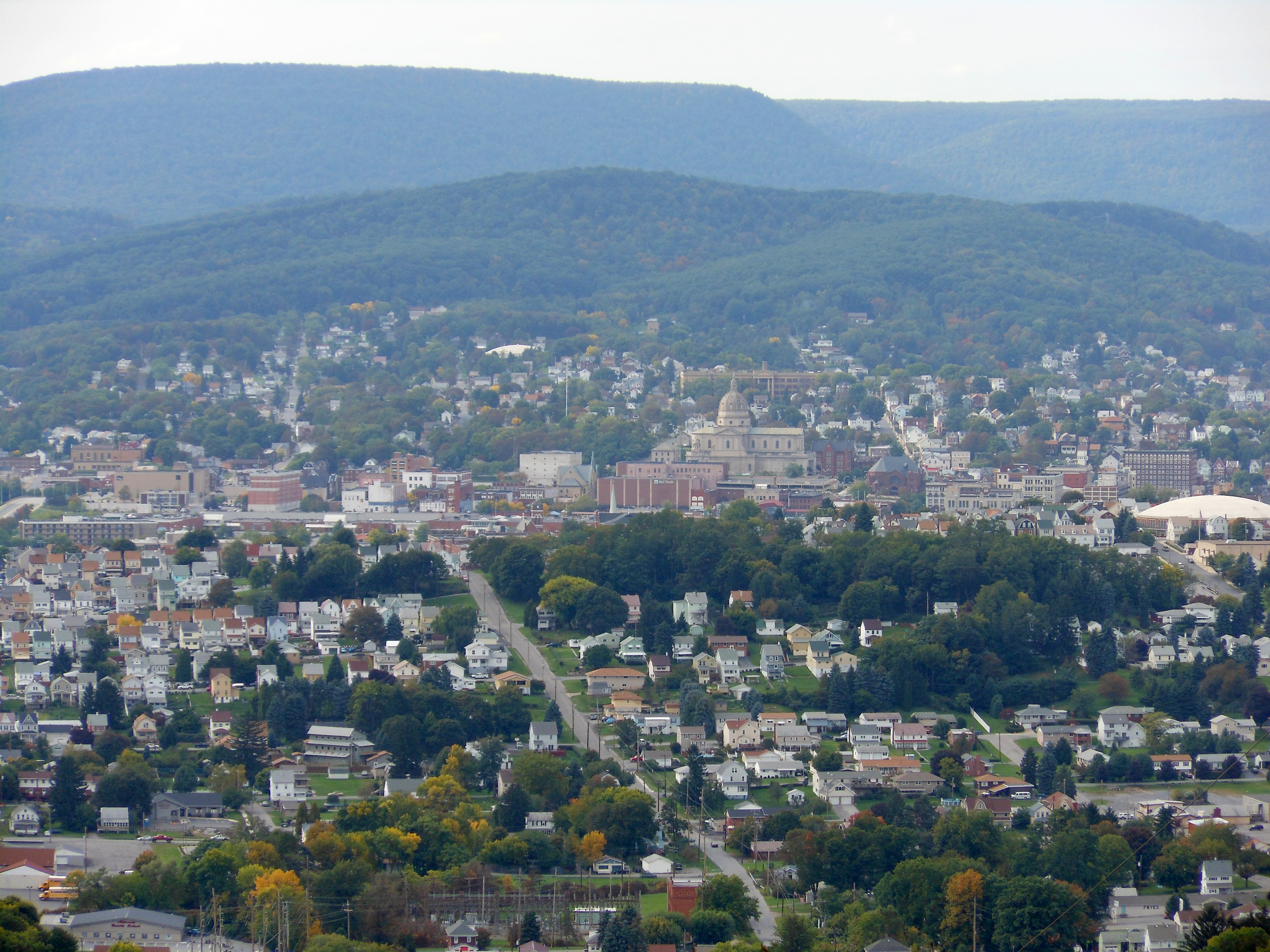
Altoona, Pennsylvania, viewed from atop Brush Mountain

== See also ==
- High Allegheny National Park and Preserve, a proposed NPS unit in eastern West Virginia
- List of subranges of the Appalachian Mountains
