= Valley Falls =

Valley Falls may refer to a place in the United States:

- Valley Falls, Kansas
- Valley Falls, New York
- Valley Falls, Oregon
- Valley Falls, Rhode Island
- Valley Falls, South Carolina
- Valley Falls State Park located in West Virginia
