= West Virginia State Museum =

American museum in Charleston, West Virginia

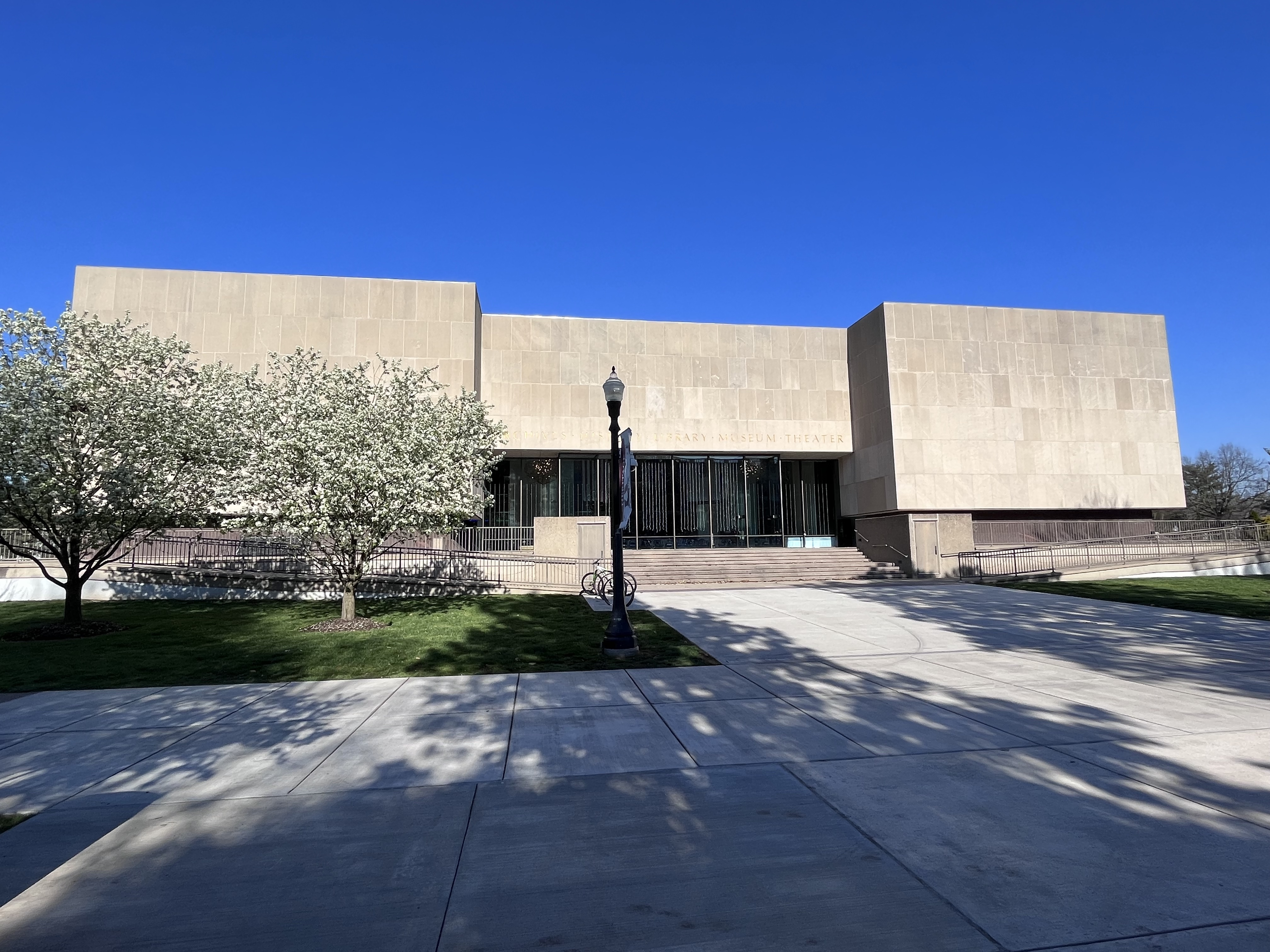
- Former name: West Virginia Science and Culture Center
- Established: 1890
- Location: West Virginia Capitol Complex, 1900 Kanawha Blvd. East, Charleston, Kanawha County, West Virginia, United States
- Coordinates: 38.3379°N 81.6141°W
- Type: History museum, Art museum, Natural history museum
- Owner: West Virginia Department of Arts, Culture and History, State of West Virginia
- Website: wvstatemuseumed.wv.gov

The West Virginia State Museum, formerly the West Virginia Science and Culture Center, is a history, culture, art, paleontology, archaeology and geology museum at the West Virginia Capitol Complex in Charleston, West Virginia. It was founded in 1890 and is considered a major museum in the state by The Statesman's Yearbook.

== About ==
The museum is managed by the West Virginia Department of Arts, Culture and History and is located within the West Virginia Capitol Complex. Exhibits cover the state's natural history, cultural history, art, geology and coal, paleontology, and historical settlements.

The museum collections are diverse and include a flag collection from the Confederate States Army; a set of early medical tools from West Virginia's pioneering physician Joseph Robins; and examples of Homer Laughlin China Company (now known as the Fiesta Tableware Company) Fiesta Tableware, a Newell-based ceramics manufacturer. It also houses the Wilson Stone (also known as Braxton County Rune Stone and Braxton County Tablet), a piece of sandstone with carved inscriptions found in 1931 and with unknown origins. In 1940, the state purchased the Wilson Stone and sent it to the University of Michigan archeologist Emerson F. Greenman, who concluded that it was, in all likelihood, a fraud.

== History ==
The earliest history of the museum started with the West Virginia Historical and Antiquarian Society in 1890, as an established exhibit in the state capitol. West Virginia governor William McCorkle opened the museum in 1894 and it moved to a capitol annex, followed by a move to the capitol basement. In 1976, the collection was re-housed in the new West Virginia Science and Culture Center and featured state of the art exhibitions of history and culture in a chronological ordered display. The West Virginia State Museum was awarded a grant (via Save America's Treasures) in 2001 for the creation of the "Civil War Regimental Flag Collection," in which many flags date as far back as 1890. In summer 2009, a newly renovated museum building debuted, after being closed for five years for a US $17.9 million dollar remodel.

In 2011, the United Mine Workers of America (UMWA) labor union's president Cecil Roberts wrote a detailed letter of complaint about issues of inaccurate depictions of their organization in the museum, as well as issues of inaccurate history, particularly around the Battle of Blair Mountain a violent labor dispute.

== Publications ==
- Catalogue of Exhibits in the State Museum (catalogue). West Virginia State Museum. Jarrett Printing Company. 1937.

== See also ==
- Goldenseal (magazine), West Virginian quarterly magazine
- Kanawha Madonna
- List of museums in West Virginia
