= Kanawha Madonna =

The Kanawha Madonna is a wood carving of a person holding a four-legged animal. The carving is part of the collection of the West Virginia State Museum and displayed in the Cultural Center as an example of prehistoric Native American wood carving. The statue is nearly 4 feet (1.2 m) tall with a 8 inches (20 cm) in height by 13 inches (33 cm) in width base. It was carved from the trunk of a honey locust tree. The base has a hole in the bottom, possibly for mounting on a pole.

== Discovery ==
In 1897, four teenaged boys found the statue while exploring a cave set in a cliff above the upper Kanawha River New River, in Kanawha County, West Virginia. They found the statue under a large flat stone. A member of the West Virginia Historical and Antiquarian Society, Dr. John P. Hale acquired the statue. Hale visited the cave and presented a paper about the statue.

In 1964 a radiocarbon date put the statue's age at 350 years. A more recent radiocarbon dating estimates the wood to date from between 1440 and 1600 CE, although this does not mean it was carved at this time. It could have been carved at any time after this.

== See also ==
- Prehistory of West Virginia
- Mississippian stone statuary
