= Tomahawk right =

Tomahawk rights — also called tomahawk settlement, tomahawk claims, or cabin rights — were an informal process that was used by early white settlers of the Appalachian and Old Northwest (Ohio, Michigan, etc) frontiers in the mid-to-late 18th century to establish priority of ownership to newly-occupied land. The claimant typically girdled several trees near the head of a spring or other prominent site and blazed the bark of one or more of them with his initials or name.

== Tomahawk rights ==
Land bounties had been promised by colonial officials to all those who had served in the provincial forces during the French and Indian War (1754-63), but for those who could not qualify for such bounties, the practice grew up at the Pennsylvania and Virginia frontiers of taking possession of unoccupied land without authority and establishing "tomahawk claims," which were widely respected among the earliest pioneers. To claim tomahawk rights, the claimant typically girdled several trees near the head of a spring and blazed the bark of one or more of them with their initials or name.

Tomahawk rights gave the settler no legal title unless they were followed by occupation or a warrant and a patent secured from the land office. However, tomahawk rights were quite generally recognized by the early settlers, and many of them were purchased cheaply by other settlers, who did not want to enter a controversy with the claimants who made them.

After 1778, in Virginia, tomahawk rights were put to the test. According to a local historian of northwestern Virginia:

Virginia gave to every bona fide settler who built a log cabin and raised a crop of corn before 1778, a title to 400 acres of land and a pre-emption to 1000 acres more adjoining. These commissioners were appointed to give certificates of these “settlement rights.” The certificate with the surveyor’s plat was sent to the land office at Richmond, and in six months if no caveat was offered, the patent was issued, and the title was complete. There was previous to the settlement right a right, which was no right in law, called the “tomahawk right.” A hunter would deaden a few trees about a spring and cut his name in the bark of others, and then claim the land in after years. Some land-owners paid them voluntarily a trifle to get rid of them; others did not. The settlement-right to 400 acres was certified to and a certificate issued upon payment of ten shillings per one hundred acres. The cost of certificate was two shillings and six pence.

== Cabin rights ==
Building a cabin and raising a crop of grain of any kind, however small, led to cabin rights, which were recognized not only by custom but also by law. The laws of the colonies and states varied in their requirements of the settler. In Virginia, the occupant was entitled to 400 acres (1.6 km^{2}) of land and to a pre-emption right to 1,000 acres (4 km^{2}) more adjoining, to be secured in either case by a land-office warrant, which was the basis of a later patent or grant from colonial or state authorities.

== Popular culture references ==
- The Swedish film The Emigrants (1971) ends with a newly-arrived settler in Minnesota claiming his stake by prominently blazing a tree trunk. (The action is anachronistic, however, since the story takes place in 1844.)

== Sources ==
- Dictionary of American History by James Truslow Adams, New York: Charles Scribner's Sons, 1940.
