= Valley Falls State Park =

State Park in Marion and Taylor counties, West Virginia

- IUCN category III (natural monument or feature)
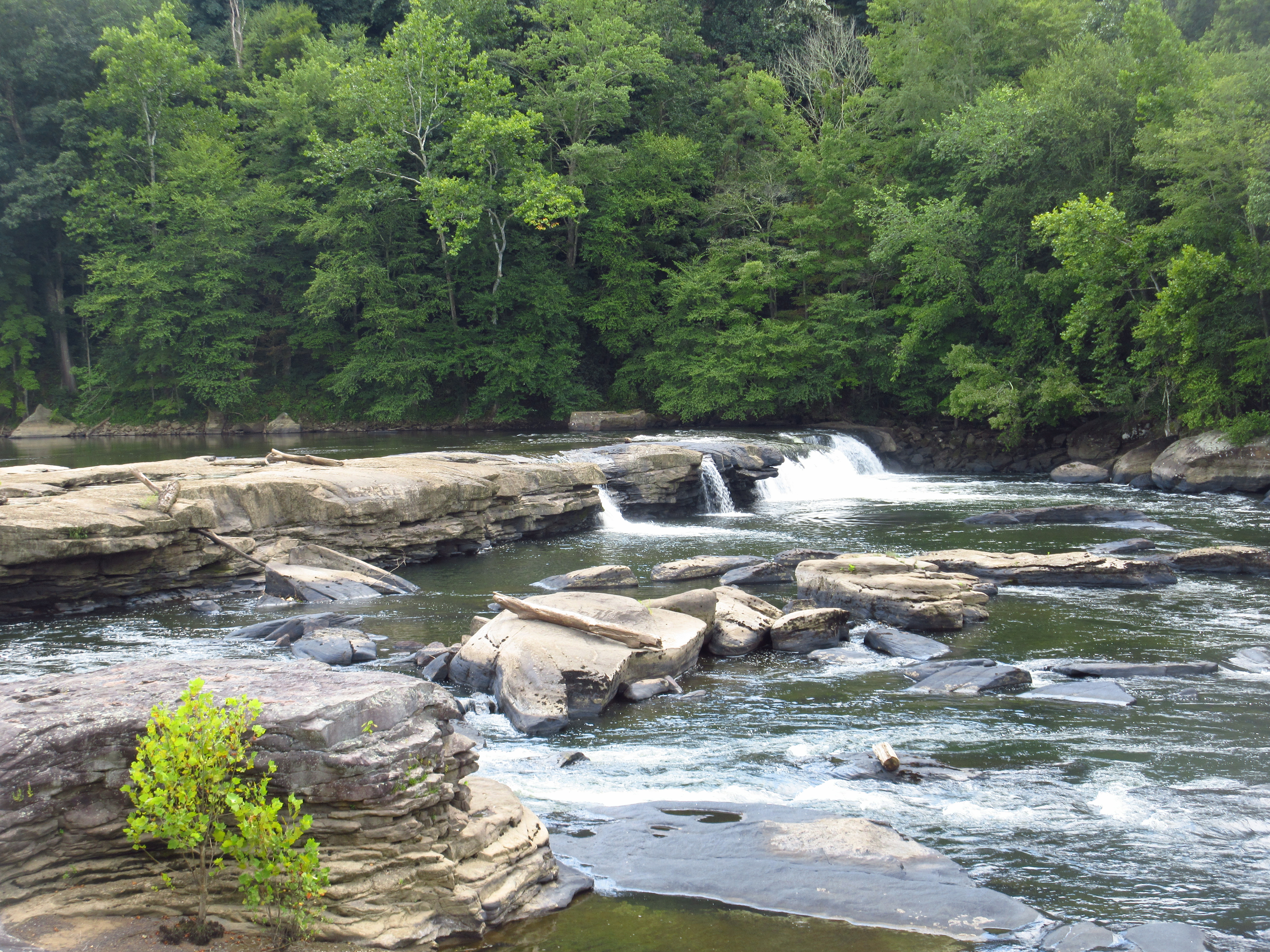
- Tygart Valley River

- Location within West Virginia
- Location: West Virginia, United States
- Coordinates: 39°23′38″N 80°04′56″W
- Area: 1,145 acres (4.63 km^{2})
- Elevation: 1,558 ft (475 m)
- Established: 1964
- Named for: Valley Falls on the Tygart River
- Governing body: West Virginia Division of Natural Resources
- Website: wvstateparks.com/park/valley-falls-state-park/

Valley Falls State Park is a 1,145 acre (4.63 km²) day use facility sited along both banks of the Tygart Valley River in West Virginia, United States. The park is located about 7 miles (11 km) south of exit 137 of I-79, near Fairmont, West Virginia.

The park's main feature is a half-mile long set of cascades — the "Valley Falls" — that separate Marion and Taylor County, West Virginia. The park and river provide a popular and risky kayaking run.

Although the falls are an inviting spot, swimming is not allowed.

Local tradition had it that early settler Jonathan Nixon, Sr (1753–1799) was the first white man to look upon the falls. In the 19th century a small community thrived along the river at the current state park's location. The ruins of a sawmill and a gristmill are still visible along the river.

== Features ==
- Mountain Biking
- Hiking trails
- Playground
- Picnic area
- Volleyball court
- Fishing
- Kayaking

== See also ==
- List of West Virginia state parks
- state park
